= Milosav Lapovac =

Serbian commander in the First Serbian Uprising

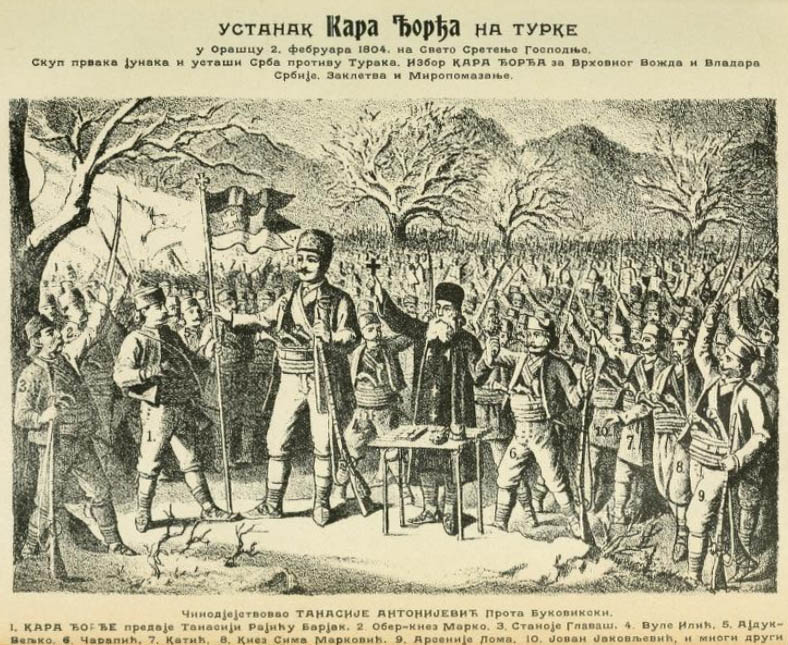
- Illustration of the Orašac Assembly from Život i dela Kara-Đorđa (1903).
- Born: Milosav Stojanović; 1770; Sikirica, Ottoman Empire (now Serbia)
- Died: 1844 (aged 73–74); Rača, Principality of Serbia (now Serbia)
- Cause of death: Natural
- Children: Laza
- Military career
- Allegiance: Revolutionary Serbia (1804–1815)
- Service years: 1804–1815
- Rank: buljubaša (captain)
- Nickname: Lapovac (a demonym)
- Unit: Smederevo nahija army
- Commands: Smederevo nahija
- Known for: hajduk (brigand), commander in Smederevo nahija, knez (mayor)
- Conflicts: First Serbian Uprising; Second Serbian Uprising

Milosav Lapovac (Serbian: Милосав Лаповац; 1770–1844) was a Serb hajduk (brigand) that fought in the First Serbian Uprising. A member of Stanoje Glavaš's band prior to the uprising, Lapovac participated since the beginning. He became a buljubaša (captain) in the Smederevo nahija. He joined the Second Serbian Uprising and became part of the administration under Miloš Obrenović, serving as a knez (mayor) in the Smederevo nahija.

== Early life ==
Milosav was born in c. 1770 in the village of Sikirica in the Paraćin nahiya. The family moved to Lapovo (hence his nickname, Lapovac) at the end of the 18th century where his father Stojan, a merchant, became influential in the area and amassed wealth. Milosav had four brothers, two step-brothers, and a sister who was married to the hajduk Mile Nikolić, regarded one of Stanoje Glavaš's most loyal. He was described by Miloš Milisavljević as being "of mid-height, broad shoulders, reddish hair, yellow shining eyes, serious and pensive look, sociable and pleasant".

Lapovac was a member of Stanoje Glavaš's hajduk band, along with Hajduk-Veljko, Daskal-Cvetko, Cincar-Janko, Konda from Morava, Vule Ilić, and Milovan from Velika Plana, among others; the band camped in the forest between Kubršnica and Jasenica from early spring to late autumn, and in the winter stayed at houses of rich Serbs or monasteries; Lapovac often stayed at the Miljkovo Monastery in Gložane. They were highwaymen who made frequent attacks on merchant caravans.

== Uprising ==
A number of Serb notables that survived the Slaughter of the Knezes gathered at the house of Matija Karatošić in Kopljare in Šumadija, on February 11–12, where it was decided to hold a secret assembly at Orašac. The Kopljare meeting was attended by Karađorđe, Glavaš, Vule, Milovan, Milosav, Kara-Steva and Hajduk-Mileta. Milosav is listed among the most important figures of the Orašac Assembly (14 February 1804), where it was decided to rise up against the Dahije. He was a close comrade of Karađorđe, the supreme leader of the uprising, and commanded a band of 30–40 from Lapovo.

Due to his distinction in the uprising, Lapovac was promoted to buljubaša (captain) of the Smederevo nahija and came under the command of vojvoda (general) Đuša Vulićević. When Đuša fell at Smederevo in 1805, his brother Vujica Vulićević took over the command of the Smederevo nahija army; Vujica proclaimed Lapovac the head buljubaša in his army. He participated in many battles, and especially showed his heroism at the Battle of Loznica in 1810, where he was wounded.

After the suppression of the first uprising in 1813, Lapovac joined Hadži-Prodan's rebellion (1814), which failed, and then joined the Second Serbian Uprising (1815), which saw the liberation of Serbia.

He married twice, secondly to Glavaš's widow Mara, and he had a son, Laza.

== Principality of Serbia ==
Miloš Obrenović, the supreme knez of Serbia, organized Serbia's 12 nahijas (nahija, the highest administrative division) into several knežina. In the first years, the knez (or obor-knez) of the Smederevo nahija was Vujica Vulićević, while the knežina knezes in the nahija were Milosav Laposav and Živan. As part of the struggle for higher autonomy (and independence), Miloš took absolute powers, which dissatisfied many in Serbia who gathered in the "Rudnik conspiracy" in December 1824, and then Đak's rebellion led by Milivoje Popović-Đak that broke out on 11 January 1825. Lapovac participated in the suppression of Đak's rebellion; when Đak on 17 January gathered knezes and serfs from Lapovo, Adžibegovac, Rakinac and Velika Plana, Lapovac informed Miloš that Đak had threatened to burn down the villages and kill their knezes and serfs if they didn't join him. Miloš asked Lapovac to have the villages stand down, as a 5,000-man army mustered in Kragujevac, and he wanted reports on all events. On 21 January Miloš ordered Lapovac to launch an offensive against the rebels, with villages who had not joined Đak, and were to be joined by Miloš's army mustered from Gruža, Jagodina, Rudnik, Požega and Užice nahijas. The force mustered by Toma Vučić Perišić attacked Đak's rebel army at dawn on 22 January, without waiting for Miloš. Lapovac and Kara-Biber arrived at Svilajnac with their force and reported to Milosav Zdravković Resavac, the knez of Ćuprija nahija, that Đak's rebels were defeated.

On 31 May 1825, Miloš promoted Ranko Majstorović, the knez of Smederevo nahija, to a seat in the National Court, and in his place appointed two knezes, Lapovac and Stojan Ćirković, to govern the knežina of Jasenica and Morava, respectively. As one of two knezes of the Smederevo nahija, Lapovac directly reported to Miloš on all important matters, regularly informing him on banditry, tax collection, ferries on the Great Morava, etc. He was a defender of the poor, and repeatedly asked Miloš to exempt taxes on these. Serbian philologist Vuk Karadžić, a contemporary, had a negative opinion about the ability of Lapovac and some other knezes active in the principality; he wrote a letter to Prince Miloš on 24 April 1832 regarding Lapovac specifically. Lapovac talked negatively about the literate.

In 1837, Milosav Lapovac was one of the first to receive a state pension, amounting to an annual 1,890 thalers. After his retirement he moved to Rača where he died in 1844.

== See also ==
- List of people of the First Serbian Uprising

== Annotations ==
1. He was known as "Milosav Lapovac" (Милосав Лаповац). His surname was "Stojanović" (Стојановић), but he never signed himself as such, for unknown reasons.

== Sources ==
- Batalaka, Lazar Arsenijević (1898). Историја српског устанка, део први [History of the Serbian Uprising: Part One]. Vol. I. Izd. Batalakinoga fonda – via Google Books.
- Batalaka, Lazar Arsenijević (1899). Историја српског устанка, део други [History of the Serbian Uprising: Part Two]. Vol. II. Izd. Batalakinoga fonda – via Google Books.
- Milanović, Dragoljub; Stanković, Milan (1991). Лапово [Lapovo]. Лапово: Месна заједница.
- Nenadović, Konstantin N. (1903) [1883]. Живот и дела великог Ђорђа Петровића Кара-Ђорђа. Vol. I (2 ed.). Belgrade: Штампа Савића и Комп. – via Archive.org.
- Protić, Kosta (1893). "Ратни догађаји из првога српског устанка под Карађорђем Петровићем 1804—1813". Годишњица Николе Чупића. XIII. Državna štamparija.
- Stanojević, Marko; Vulićević, Danijela (2023). Милосав Лаповац: између књаза и народа. Лапово: Општинска библиотека „Слово”. ISBN 978-86-81710-05-0.
- Živanović, Desimir (1967). Zapisi iz Lepenice. Savez udruženja boraca narodnooslobodilačkog rata.
