= Batalaka =

Serbian politician (1793–1869)

Lazar Arsenijević "Batalaka"
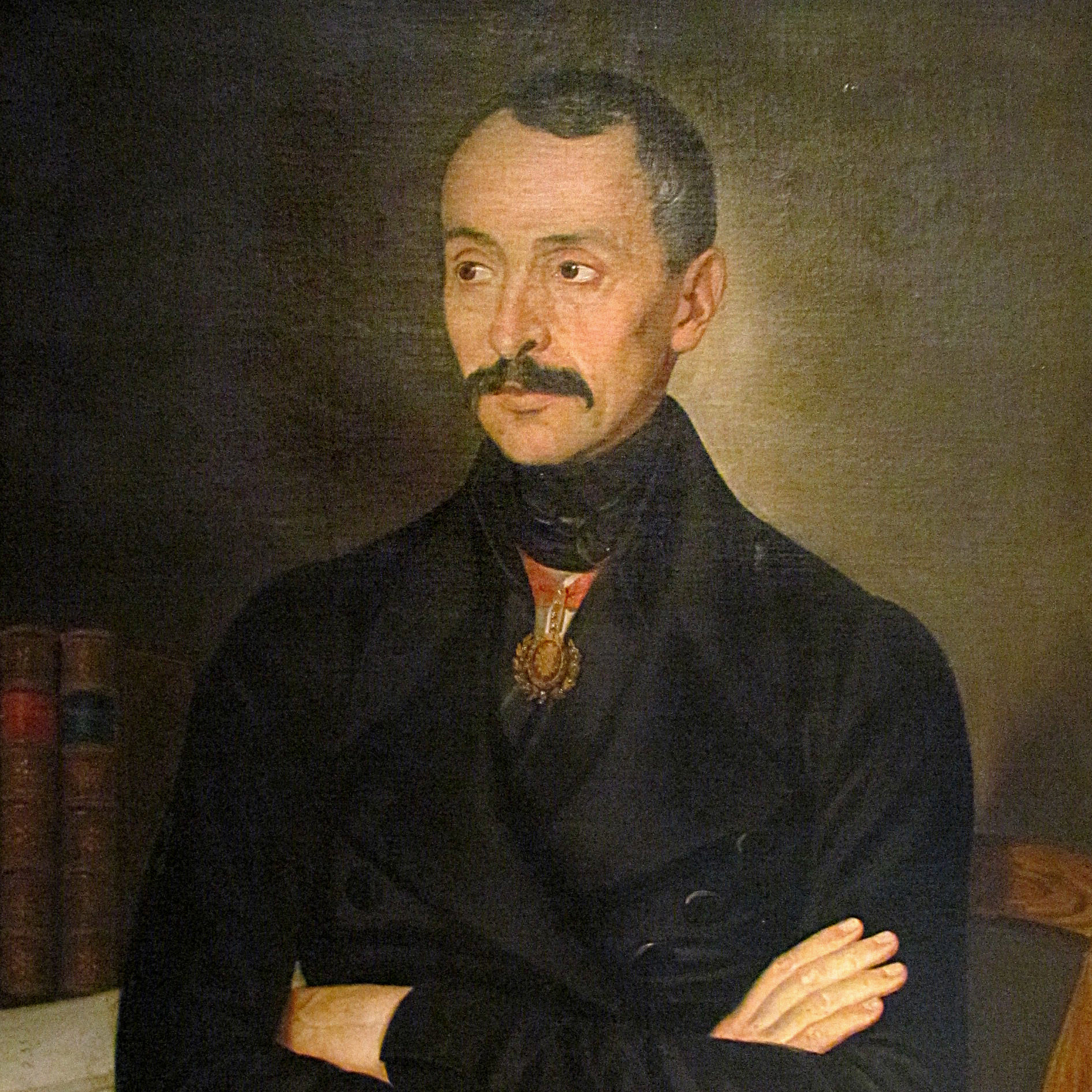

Minister of Education
- In office 27 September 1852 – 26 December 1854
- Monarch: Alexander
- Preceded by: Aleksa Simić
- Succeeded by: Aleksa Janković
- In office 3 August 1848 – 28 November 1849
- Preceded by: Tenka Stefanović
- Succeeded by: Aleksa Simić

Minister of Justice
- In office 1852–1854
- Monarch: Alexander
- Preceded by: Aleksa Simić
- Succeeded by: Aleksa Janković
- In office 1848–1849
- Preceded by: Tenka Stefanović
- Succeeded by: Aleksa Simić

Personal details
- Born: 1793 Bukovik, Sanjak of Smederevo, Ottoman Empire
- Died: 15 January 1869 (aged 75–76) Belgrade, Principality of Serbia
- Awards: Order of Glory

Lazar Arsenijević (1793–15 January 1869), known by his nickname Batalaka, was a Serbian participant in the First Serbian Uprising who later became a state adviser (from 1842), a diplomatic representative of Serbia to Constantinople (from 1846 to 1847), as well as the Minister of Justice, Minister of Education, and a historian.

== Biography ==
Arsenijević received his education during the First Serbian Uprising (1804–13) at the newly established Velika škola founded by Ivan Jugović. One of his professors was Lazar Vojnović (1783–1812), who later delivered a posthumous speech in his honor. After the fall of the Serbian uprising in 1813, Batalaka fled to Austria, where he briefly stayed in Novi Sad before moving to Imperial Russia. There, he spent over a decade in Hotin and Chișinău. While in exile, he maintained connections with prominent insurgent leaders such as Karađorđe, Luka Lazarević, Vule Ilić, Janićije Đurić, Sava Filipović, and others. To support himself, Batalaka taught the children of wealthier Serbian refugees.

In 1814, he moved to Hotin, where he served as a secretary, corresponding with Serbian commanders from across the Balkans. His proximity to Karađorđevo provided him with moral and spiritual support. After Karađorđe's death in 1817, Batalaka wrote two letters to Prince Miloš Obrenović expressing his desire to return to Serbia. His requests were eventually granted, and in 1827, he returned to Serbia, where he joined the civil service.

Initially, Arsenijević held various administrative roles in Požarevac, Kladovo, Kragujevac (where Dimitrije Davidović gave him the nickname "Batalaka", which he is known as), Belgrade, and Smederevo. Following the dynastic upheaval in Serbia in 1842, his career advanced rapidly. That same year, he was appointed State Counselor and later became the chief ministerial envoy (kapućehaja) in Constantinople (1846–1847). He subsequently served as Minister of Education and Minister of Justice in 1848 and returned as Minister of Education from 1852 to 1854.

However, the political upheaval of 1858 negatively impacted his career. After a brief period of detention, he retired alongside other state advisers and was housed at the Belgrade Military Hospital. Following his retirement, Batalaka dedicated himself to writing memoirs (1858–1864) and collaborated with Ilija Garašanin on issues related to national policy.

=== History of the Serbian Uprising ===
Batalaka spent considerable time working on his "History of the Serbian Uprising" (Istorija srpskog ustanka), a comprehensive and meticulously researched work. He drew from a wide range of sources, including official documents, original materials related to the uprising, correspondence with contemporaries, and narrative accounts from leaders and participants. Additionally, he examined excerpts from published works and other early records of the Serbian uprising. All this material was collected with care and properly referenced.

His book, "History of the Serbian Uprising" (Istorija srpskog ustanka), is considered one of the most comprehensive first-hand accounts of the First Serbian Uprising. The work offers a thorough analysis of the events leading to the restoration of the Serbian state after nearly 350 years under Ottoman rule, which began with the fall of Smederevo Fortress in 1459.

Batalaka's historical work proved to be of great value to statesman Ilija Garašanin, especially in dealing with requests from Russian consuls in Serbia.

== See also ==
- List of Serbian Revolutionaries
