= Orašac Assembly =

1804 gathering of Serbian chiefs and rebels

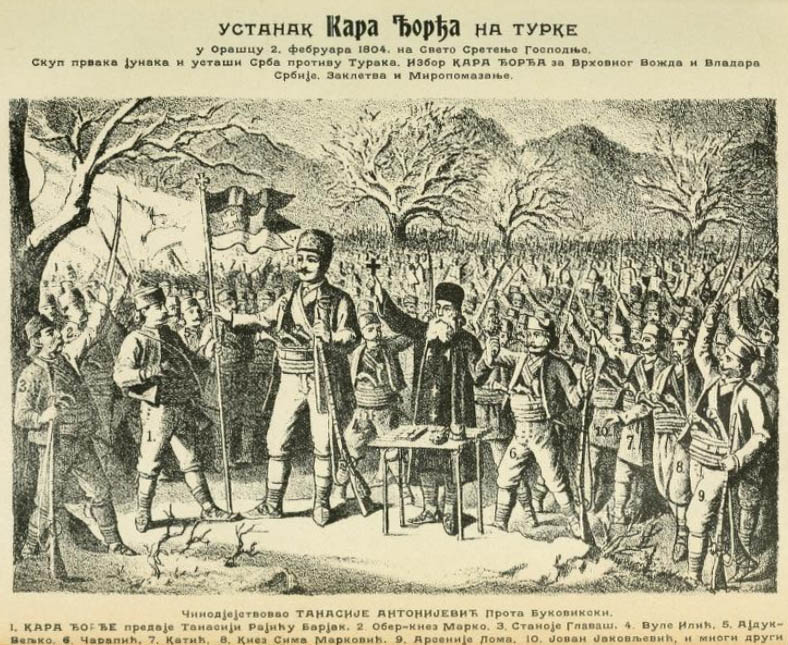
- Illustration of the Orašac Assembly from Život i dela Kara-Đorđa (1903).
- Date: 14 February [O.S. 2 February] 1804
- Location: Orašac, Ottoman Empire (now Serbia)
- Also known as: Meeting in Orašac
- Theme: Uprising against the Dahije
- Cause: Slaughter of the Knezes
- Participants: Belgrade and Kragujevac nahiya Serbs
- Outcome: First Serbian Uprising

The Orašac Assembly was the gathering of 300 Serbian chiefs and rebels on 14 February [O.S. 2 February] 1804 (Presentation of Jesus) at Orašac, a village near Aranđelovac, following the "Slaughter of the Knezes" which saw notable Serbs murdered by the renegade Janissaries (the Dahije) in January which prompted the Serbs to rise up against the tyranny (known in historiography as the "Uprising against the Dahije"), resulting in the First Serbian Uprising against the Ottoman Empire. Karađorđe was appointed leader of the Serbian rebels after they all raised their "three fingers in the air" and thereby swore oath. The site of the assembly, Marićevića jaruga, is today a memorial complex.

== Background ==
The renegade Janissaries known as Dahije wrested power in the Belgrade Pashalik in 1800–1801. On 8 November 1803 Serb conspirators met in Orašac to plan an uprising. The Dahije learnt of the conspiracies to overthrow them in 1803, started monitoring the Serbs and then decided to kill Serb leaders in order to thwart a rebellion against them. The Slaughter of the Knezes in late January and overall bad state prompted the Serbs to rise up against the Dahije.

Karađorđe heard of the murders and survived attempts on his life, and decided to begin what was long planned (he was part of the 1803 conspiracy); he sold off all of his swine to Austrian merchants, sent his family into safety in the mountain, and then crossed the Morava river and found famed hajduk leader Stanoje Glavaš, who led a strong band (including Hajduk-Veljko, Vule Ilić, Milosav Lapovac, and others) and whom all other hajduks would follow, and collected his friends and trusted men (such as Petar Jokić, Aleksa Dukić, Janićije Đurić) in the Jasenica knežina in the Kragujevac nahiya. Enthusiastic about the support, Karađorđe told everyone to gather their men and meet at Orašac to discuss starting the rebellion.

== Assembly ==
The leading Serbs of the Belgrade and Kragujevac nahiyas decided to secretly meet at a secluded place near Orašac to discuss the uprising on 14 February [O.S. 2 February] 1804 (Candlemas, Sretenje). The murders of Serb leaders and the overall bad state in the Pashalik under Dahije rule motivated holding the secret assembly. The main organizer of the meeting was Karađorđe, an Austrian veteran, militia commander, merchant and hajduk, who had survived Dahije attempts on his life. Participants were carefully chosen and included knezes and other notables and leaders (starešine), as well as Orthodox priests and hajduk (brigand) leaders. Most of the leaders hailed from the Kragujevac nahiya. Among notable participants were Karađorđe's friend and also veteran and hajduk Stanoje Glavaš, the knez and merchant Teodosije Marićević, Glavaš's hajduks Vule Ilić-Kolarac and Veljko Petrović, veteran Arsenije Loma, Karađorđe's associate Tanasko Rajić, among others. Karađorđe had conspired with participants earlier regarding an uprising. The place for the meeting was hardly accessible and hidden, a gully (called Marićevića jaruga) in the village of Orašac, and early dawn was chosen as the time. Participants arrived the day prior or during the night ahead of the meeting. Apart from those invited by Karađorđe and his associates, of the Kragujevac nahiya, some heard of the plans and came from the Jagodina and Rudnik nahiyas. At dawn, sentinels were set up around the assembly location near two large elms on a plateau surrounded on all sides by dense grove. There are various estimates on the number of participants. Janićije Đurić, the secretary of Karađorđe, mentioned more than 300 "courageous and good heroes", while Petar Jokić mentioned that those previously present at the Holy Archangel assembly were present at Orašac along with 500 more. Batalaka numbered "up to 300 of the most selected, arms-carrying people". Karađorđe's entourage numbered 70–80 according to Jokić.

The assembly began with Karađorđe holding a speech regarding the bad state in the Pashalik under Dahije rule and the need to revolt.

According to Batalaka, his speech included:

My brothers, you see what the Turk Janissaries do; you see that they decide to completely prey and enslave us; you see that nothing of ours is let in peace, not our holy churches, nor monasteries; you see what the evil-doers and lawless do to our daughters, sisters, daughter-in-laws, and our young women; how they rape them, dishonour, and enslave. And at last, there, you see how they begin cutting and slaughtering our knezes and other notables among our people. I saw, some day prior, crossing the village of Zeoke in the Belgrade nahiya, with my own eyes how the family, and villagers, bury their knez, without a head, crying for him, who the Turks killed and cut the head off to take to Belgrade. This, my brothers, can no longer endure. My intention, which I have informed some of you, is that we rise against this Turk zulum (oppression), that we beat up Turk musellims, set fire to inns in the villages and elsewhere, that we kill and expel the Turk handžije (inn-keepers) and subaşı, and send message to the Dahije: to stop slaughtering and killing our brothers, and if they won't stop all that, we strike and beat them in their litters, and for once free ourselves from evil. I trust God, the merciful, who sees our bitter sorrows, will be to our help; and from the [Ottoman] emperor, we have nothing to fear, because my intention is not to go against the emperor, only that we free ourselves from these evil-doers, who not only act this soullessly towards us, but also are against the very emperor.

According to K. Nenadović, his speech included:

Here we are brothers, in the name of God rising up against the Turks, who cut down our knezes, steal our property, enslave and pillage us, dishonour our wives, sisters and daughters, trample on our honesty, defile our churches and monasteries, and many other zulum (atrocities) they do to us ... Now brothers, if your adhere, as I have begun and as I believe, God willing, it will be fine for our people, that we rise up all of our people; we will burn down all inns and Turk chardaks in the villages, kill the handžije and subaşı, drive the Turks to the cities, so that they no more commit atrocities on our people.

All present leaders unanimously supported rebellion. Karađorđe suggested several candidates to lead the uprising, who all declined: hajduk Stanoje Glavaš, hajduk Vule Ilić-Kolarac, knez Marko Savić and merchant Teodosije Marićević. After relucting, Karađorđe finally accepted to lead the uprising when the participants repeatedly asked for a leader with traits as Karađorđe. The archpriest of Bukovik, Atanasije Antonijević, wore the epitrachelion and lit wax candles, blessed the election of Karađorđe, the decisions made at the assembly, and swore in the participants' loyalty towards Karađorđe as vožd ("leader") and the uprising. Karađorđe swore that he, "as supreme leader (vrhovni vožd) and warden (upravitelj) of the Serb people, he will defend the Serbs from the Turks and all violence and injustice, and protect, and always heroically lead against enemies of Serbdom and be faithful to it". He kissed the Evangelion and cross, and archpriest Atanasije anointed and blessed him. All present raised their "three fingers in the air" and thereby swore oath.

Participants

- Atanasije Antonijević, archpriest (protojerej), from Bukovik in Kragujevac nahiya.
- Stanoje Glavaš, hajduk leader, Free Corps veteran, from Glibovac in Smederevo nahiya.
- Hajduk-Veljko Petrović, hajduk under Glavaš, from Lenovac in Crna Reka nahiya, Vidin Pashalik.
- Vule Ilić-Kolarac, hajduk under Glavaš, from Kolari.
- Milosav Lapovac, hajduk under Glavaš, from Lapovo.
- Đorđic, hajduk under Glavaš, from Viševac.
- Jovan Krstović, from Bukovik in Kragujevac nahiya, Karađorđe's blood-brother.
- Aleksa Dukić, hajduk, Free Corps veteran, from Banja in Kragujevac nahiya. Among his entourage were his brothers Đorđe and Tanasije, Jovan Riznić, the Tomković brothers (Sreten, Teofan and Jakov), all from Banja.
- Arsenije Loma, from Dragolj in Rudnik nahiya.
- Tanasko Rajić, hajduk, from Stragari in Kragujevac nahiya.
- Janićije Đurić, hajduk, from Stragari in Kragujevac nahiya, with entourage.
- Marko Savić, from Orašac, knez of Orašac in Kragujevac nahiya, Karađorđe's associate.
- Teodosije Maričević, from Orašac in Kragujevac nahiya, merchant.
- Aleksa Jakovljević, from Orašac in Kragujevac nahiya.
- Vićentije Petrović, knez from Koraćica in Belgrade nahiya.
- Matija Jovičić, former hajduk, knez of Topola in Kragujevac nahiya, with own entourage.
- Petar Jokić, from Topola in Kragujevac nahiya, hajduk buljubaša, with own entourage. Among others from Topola were Andreja Jokić (Petar's brother), Rista Đurđević, Mihailo Manojlović, Paun Čolić, Matija Milošević, Lazar Milosavljević, Dimitrije Perić, Dimitrije Manojlović, Gavrilo Đurić, Grigorije Marković.
- Milovan Đurković, from Jagnjilo in Kragujevac nahiya.
- Matija Karatošić-Mata, from Kopljare in Kragujevac nahiya.
- Milutin Savić, from Garaši.
- Milovan and Radovan Garašanin, from Lipovac in Kragujevac nahiya.
- Dimitrije Radović, from Vrbica in Kragujevac nahiya.
- Marko Katić, from Rogača in Belgrade nahiya, in place of his brother Janko Katić.
- Petar Dugonjić, Blagoje, Gliša, Ćira Prokić, Miloje Čekerević, all from Masloševo in Kragujevac nahiya.
- Stevan Rajaković, Mata Milivojević, Mandić and Milovan Đurić, all from Stragari in Kragujevac nahiya.
- Gaja Ostojić, from Orašac in Kragujevac nahiya.
- Petar Kara, from Trešnjevica in Kragujevac nahiya.
- Mile Nikolić–Hajduk-Mileta, hajduk under Glavaš, from Glibovac in Smederevo nahiya.
- Kara-Steva, hajduk under Glavaš, from Provo or Vlaole.
- Hajduk-Milovan, hajduk under Glavaš, from Velika Plana.
- Miloš Arsenijević, from Dragolj in Rudnik nahiya.
- Janko Račanin, from Rača.
- Nikodije Dobrić, from Ovsište.
- Marko Milosavljević, from Kopljare in Kragujevac nahiya.
- Nikola Leka, from Lipovac in Kragujevac nahiya.
- Sima Serdar, from Darosava in Belgrade nahiya.
- Toma Starčević, Jovan Bulatović, from Orašac in Kragujevac nahiya.
- Vasilije Stefanović-Vasa Saramanda, from Bukovik in Kragujevac nahiya.
- There are some unverified claims of participation.

== Aftermath and legacy ==
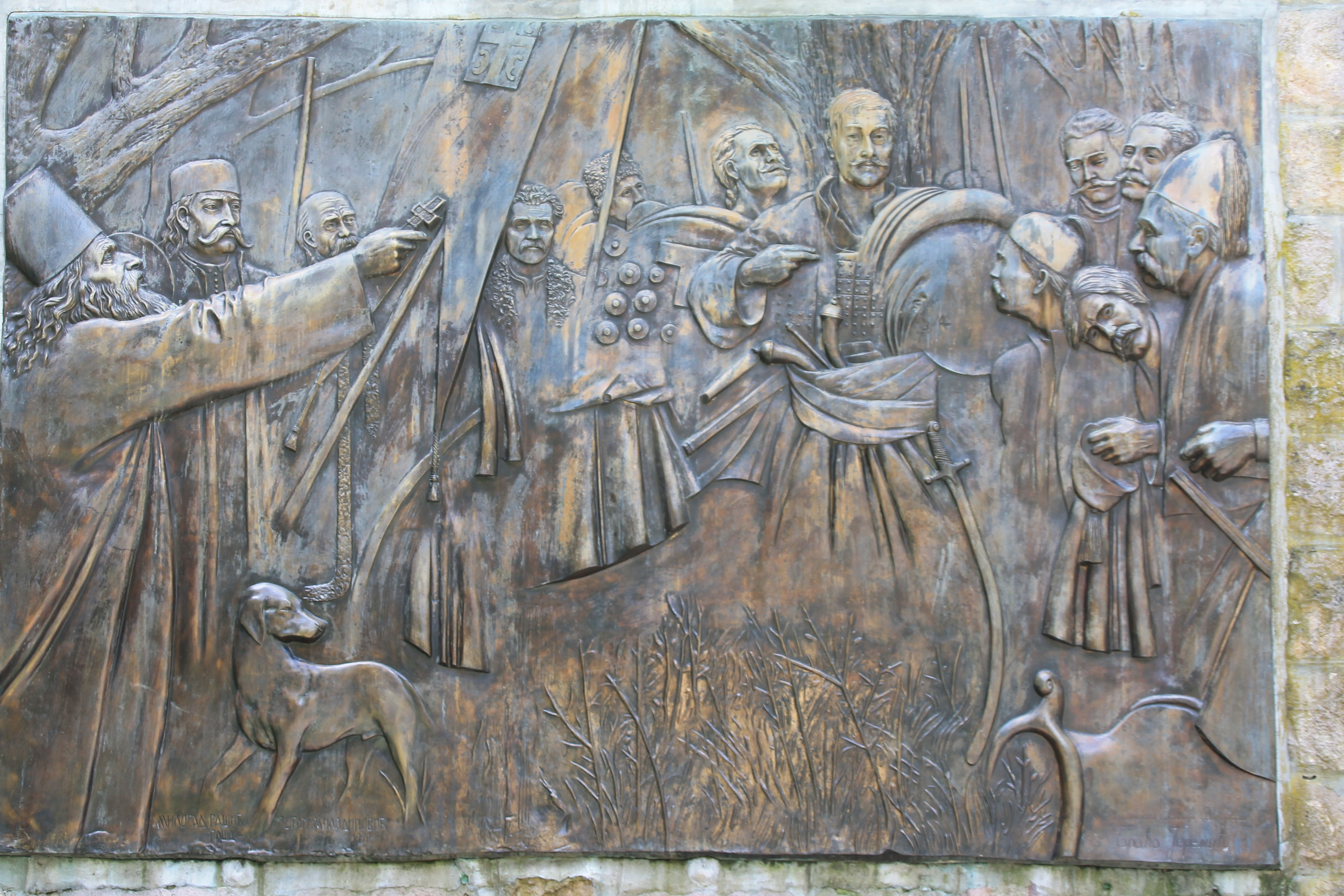
Motif at the memorial at Orašac.

The uprising immediately began, and on 4 February the Austrian Military Frontier government reported that "the Christian Serbs have taken up arms". In ten days, Karađorđe, Glavaš and Marko Katić had burnt inns and risen the people of many villages in the Kragujevac and Belgrade nahiyas, while Loma did the same in the Rudnik nahiya. The rebel numbers grew up to 2,000 in the days following a successful attack on a group of Janissaries at Sibnica. The Valjevo nahiya Serbs, headed by the Nenadović family (Jakov and Matija), decided to organize rebellion and prepared through trading swine and cattle to fund it; by 27 February [O.S. 15 February] 1804, or the following day, the notables gathered at Brankovina and joined the uprising.

The Orašac Assembly is included in many Serbian epic poems, such as contemporary Sarajlija's Narodnji vožda izbor.

14 February (Candlemas) was chosen as Serbian Independence Day due to the Orašac Assembly in 1804 and Sretenje Constitution in 1835.

== See also ==
- Assemblies of the Serbian Revolution
- Timeline of the Serbian Revolution

== Annotations ==
1. It is known in historiography as the "Orašac assembly" (Serbian: Збор у Орашцу/Zbor u Orašcu, Скупштина у Орашцу/Skupština u Orašcu)
2. Including: Vasa Čarapić, from Beli Potok in Belgrade nahiya (according to K. Nenadović); Sima Marković, from Veliki Borak in Belgrade nahiya (according to K. Nenadović); Đuka, from Jagnjilo, obor-knez of Lepenica in Kragujevac nahiya (according to K. Nenadović and M. Milićević); Stevan-Teodor Filipović, from Jagnjilo in Kragujevac nahiya, brother of Marko Filipović, Karađorđe's brother-in-law (according to K. Nenadović and M. Milićević); Jovan Jakovljević, from Levač in Jagodina nahiya (according to K. Nenadović).

== Sources ==
- Batalaka, Lazar Arsenijević (1898). Историја српског устанка, део први [History of the Serbian Uprising: Part One]. Vol. I. Izd. Batalakinoga fonda – via Google Books.
- Batalaka, Lazar Arsenijević (1899). Историја српског устанка, део други [History of the Serbian Uprising: Part Two]. Vol. II. Izd. Batalakinoga fonda – via Google Books.
- Graovac, Srđan (9 March 2018), "Карађорђе и Српска револуција 1804. године: РАЂАЊЕ СЛОБОДЕ", Agora, KCNS
- Mitrinović, Čedomil; Brašić, Miloš (1937). Југословенске народне скупштине и сабори [Yugoslav national assemblies and councils]. Изд. Народне скупштине.
- Milićević, M. Đ. (1876). Kneževina Srbija. Vol. 1. Sloboda. pp. 246–251.
- Nenadović, Konstantin N. (1903) [1883]. Живот и дела великог Ђорђа Петровића Кара-Ђорђа [Life and Deeds of Great Đorđe Petrović Kara-Đorđe]. Vol. I (2 ed.). Belgrade: Штампа Савића и Комп. – via Archive.org.
- Novaković, Stojan (1904). Устанак на дахије 1804 [Uprising against the Dahije]. Државна штампарија – via Archive.org.
- Protić, Kosta (1893). "Ратни догађаји из првога српског устанка под Карађорђем Петровићем 1804—1813". Годишњица Николе Чупића. XIII. Државна штампарија: 114–116.
- Stojančević, Vladimir (1957). "Борбе за ослобођење Београда 1804–1806 године" (PDF). ГОДИШЊАК. IV. Музеј града Београда: 111–142.
- Vukićević, Milenko M. (1907). Карађорђе, књига прва (1752–1804) [Karađorđe, First Book (1752–1804)]. Vol. 1. Државна штампарија Краљевине Србије – via Archive.org.
