= Banja, Aranđelovac =

Coordinates: 44°16′N 20°37′E

Banja
- Village
- Interactive map of Banja
- Country: Serbia
- District: Šumadija
- Municipality: Aranđelovac

Population (2002)
  - Total: 2,246
- Time zone: UTC+1 (CET)
  - Summer (DST): UTC+2 (CEST)

Banja (Serbian: Бања) is a village in the municipality of Aranđelovac, Serbia. According to the 2002 census, the village has a population of 2246 people.

== History ==
In the late Ottoman period, Banja was part of the Jasenica knežina (Christian self-governing village groups) of the Kragujevac nahiya.

Banja was involved in the First Serbian Uprising since the beginning. Several locals participated at the Orašac Assembly (14 February), where notables of mostly the Kragujevac and Belgrade nahiyas decided for rebellion against the tyrannical Dahije. Among these were Aleksa Dukić, a hajduk (brigand) and Free Corps veteran, and his brothers Đorđe and Tanasije, Jovan Riznić, the Tomković brothers (Sreten, Teofan and Jakov).
