= Janićije Đurić =

Serbian politician

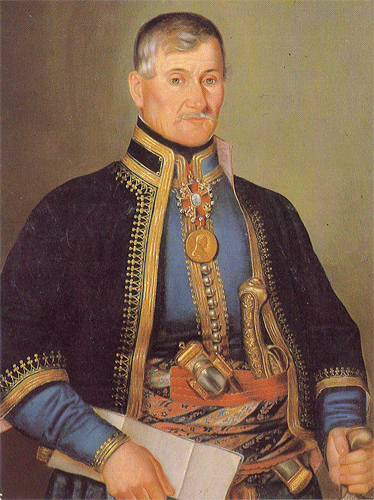
Portrait of Janićije Đurić (1779 - 1850)

Janićije Dimitrijević Đurić (1779 – 14 April 1850), also spelled Janićije Djurić, was the secretary of Karađorđe Petrović, a member of the Governing State Council and the president of the Court of Appeals.

== Karađorđe's secretary ==
Janićije Đurić was born in 1779 in Stragari in the Kragujevac nahiye. He was a friend of Tanasko Rajić when his sister Perunika married. He was educated in the monastery of the Annunciation in Rudnik. He joined the insurgents at the very beginning of the First Serbian Uprising in 1804.When Tanasko Rajić heard about the upcoming Orašac Assembly, he took his men and Janićije Đurić and went to the Stragari han (inn) where they killed the innkeeper (hanadžija) and razed the inn to the ground. Janićije Đurić participated in the Orašac Assembly on 14 February 1804.Karađorđe was elected supreme leader (Vožd), and Janićije Đurić was elected his secretary, which he remained until the collapse of the First Serbian Uprising. He immediately wrote nine letters in Orašac, in which Karađorđe called on important people to join the insurrection against the occupying forces. He had a family relationship with Karađorđe [5] and had a great influence on him.Karađorđe used to call him "Janja" (instead of Janićije).

At the end of 1808, together with Pavle Popović and Ivan Jugović, Đurić was in the delegation that Karađorđe sent to Russia, although Konstantin Rodofinikin opposed sending that delegation.The delegation went to the Russian General Staff in Iasi, where it negotiated with Prince Alexander Prozorovsky. At that time, due to the agreement with the French, the Russians intended to secure only the autonomy of Serbia within Turkey, but the Serbs demanded full independence, which the Russians had promised them earlier. When it became known that the Russians would go to war with the Turks again, negotiations in Iasi became pointless, so the Serbian delegation returned to Belgrade in early April 1809. Karađorđe sent Janićije to Wallachia in May 1809 to agree with Prozorovsky on a joint war against the Turks.

In 1812, he was awarded the Imperial Russian Order of St. Anna, II degree.

== Replaced Karađorđe twice ==
In 1813, Karađorđe sent him to Imperial Russia for help, but on the way, he was hindered by Austria. After the fall of Deligrad, the Serbian insurgent army was in a great crisis, and on September 14, 1809, Karađorđe transferred all his powers to Janićije Đurić. In difficult moments, on July 22, 1813, Karađorđe again temporarily transferred the supreme power to Janićije Đurić.

Karađorđe sent him to be the commander-in-chief instead of him on the Drina.However, Đurić proved to be a very bad military commander. After the defeat of the insurgent army at Zasavica, Đurić fled to Belgrade, and then, together with Karađorđe, he moved to Zemun on October 3, 1813.He took his mother, wife, his three children and five servants with him.

== In exile ==
In Zemun, the Austrian authorities separated him from Karadjordje. The Austrian authorities sent Karađorđe to the Fenek monastery and kept Đurić under guard in Zemun. He managed to find a way to deliver Russian messages to Karađorđe so that they would remain consistent in their wishes to move to Russia. When Austrian General Crvenka learned of Đurić's skilful delivery of letters, he called him the Russian spirit. Đurić was sent to Petava, and then went to Russia together with Karađorđe.

Karađorđe blamed Metropolitan of Belgrade Leontije Lambrović, and Janicije Đurić of being responsible for the fall of Serbia.That is why they took revenge on Karadjordje when he arrived in Hotin in Bessarabia, then part of Imperial Russia, in November 1814. From mid-November 1814, At the time Karađorđe was a permanent resident of Hotin, and in early 1817 moved to Chișinău. Until 1830, he received aid in the amount of 2,500 rubles from the Russian government.

Somewhat later, in April 1815, Đurić travelled with Karađorđe and several dukes to Petrograd. Together with Jakov Nenadović, Luka Lazarević, Petar Dobrnjac and Milenko Stojković, he was in opposition to Karađorđe and supported Prince Miloš Obrenović's strategies and tactics with the Turks. Together with Luka Lazarević, he gave information about Karađorđe's escape from Hotin at the end of June 1817, when Karađorđe secretly crossed into Serbia and was then killed in an ambush.

== Return to Serbia ==
He returned to Serbia in 1830. As he was quite rich, he built a large house on the site where the royal court was later built. He later sold the house to the state. He also had another house in Terazije, which he also sold during his lifetime. [5] In March 1834, he became a member of the Legislative Commission.He was appointed a member of the State Council on 15 February 1835 and was confirmed at the Peter's Assembly in the same year. He was appointed a member in March 1839 and president of the Court of Appeals on 21 June 1840. He became a member of the State Council again on 3 September 1840, until Vučić's revolt.

He was removed in September 1842 from the position of advisor. He then complained to Toma Vučić-Perišić that they unfairly suspected him of being in favour of the Obrenovićs. After the shrift, he retired and lived for a time in Belgrade and for a time in Stragari.

He had four children, two sons, Vladislav and Aleksandar, and two daughters, Paula and Milica.

He died 14 April 1850 in Stragari. He was buried in the monastery of Voljavča, where he built a bell tower in 1838. His house in Stragari housed a valuable archive from the First Serbian Uprising, but it burned down at the end of the 19th century. During his stay in Russia, he began to record the events from the First Serbian Uprising and Karađorđe's biography -- Povešnica od početka vremena vožda srpskog Karađorđa Petrovića (The History from the Beginning of the Time of Serbian Grand Vožd Karađorđe Petrović). His writings are in the Serbian Academy of Sciences and Arts Archives in Belgrade and were published numerous times.

== See also ==
- List of Serbian Revolutionaries

== Works cited ==
- Милићевић, Милан Ђ. (1888). Поменик знаменитих људи српског народа новијега доба. Српска краљевска штампарија.
- Поповић, Радомир Ј. (2003). Тома Вучић Перишић. Београд: Историјски институт Београд.
- Љушић, Радош (1986). Кнежевина Србија (1830—1839). Београд: САНУ. ISBN 9788670250253.
- Ненадовић, Константин (1884). Живот и дела Карађорђа и његови војвода и јунака 2. део. Беч.
- Љушић, Радош (2000a). Вожд Карађорђе — књига 1. Београд: Удружење за српску повесницу.
- Љушић, Радош (2000b). Вожд Карађорђе — књига 2. Београд: Удружење за српску повесницу.
- Поповић, Радомир Ј. (2007). Српски биографски речник; 3, Д-З. Нови Сад: Матица српска. p. 661. ISBN 978-86-7946-001-1.
