= Atanasije Antonijević =

Serbian Archpriest

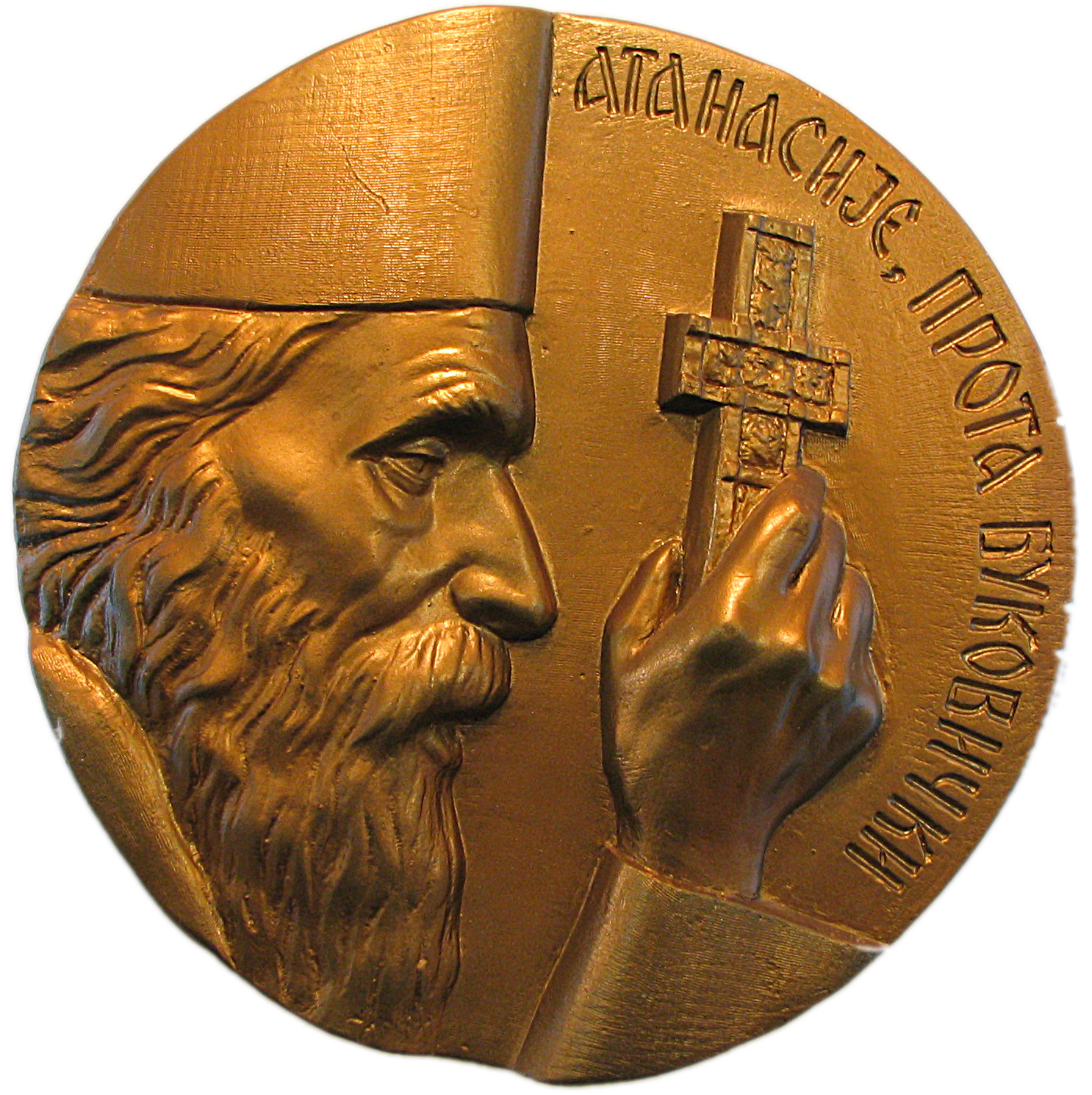

Atanasije Antonijević (Serbian Cyrillic: Атанасије Антонијевић; 1734-1804) was a Serbian archpriest of Bukovik known for blessing Karađorđe and the insurgents in Orašac in 1804 which precipitated the Serbian Revolution. He took part not only in the preparation of the First Serbian Uprising and thereafter prosecuting warfare but also in the process of the restoration of the Serbian state. History gives him a hallowed place to be remembered among the likes of his contemporaries such as the four martyred monks Hadži Ruvim, Hadži-Đera, Pajsije Ristović, and Avakum along with two hierarchs Metropolitan Melentije Pavlović and Melentije Simeonović Nikšić and priests Mateja Nenadović and Luka Lazarević. In literature he is mentioned among the best champions of Orthodoxy.

== Biography ==
Atanasije Antonijević, son of Antonio Popović, was born in Bukovik near Bukulja. He got his first education with his uncle, the priest of Bukovik, Jeftimije, and then he went to Belgrade where he learned to be a tailor. He learned Turkish and Greek in Belgrade, which was of great benefit to the insurgents later on. After the sudden death of his uncle Jeftimije, Atanasije was ordained to the rank of a priest and soon afterwards to the rank of archpriest. Atanasije had a brother Arsenije who was a merchant in Zemun and other brothers, as well as a sister whose son was Vasilije Stefanović Saramanda, who stood out in the First Serbian Uprising.

== Participation in the Uprising ==
Thanks to his knowledge of the Greek language, he was on good terms with the Greek bishops in Serbia, and thanks to his knowledge of Turkish, he learned that the execution of Karađorđe was planned in the Slaughter of the Knezes. He informed Karađorđe about it in time and thus saved his life. He kept in constant contact with Karađorđe and encouraged him to organize an Uprising. The first insurgents gathered at the wedding of Stevan Tomić in Orašac, at the end of 1803. On that occasion, Father Atanasija swore to the conspirators in the Marićevića jaruga that he would not reveal the secret of his agreement: "Brothers, it has been so many hundreds of years since all our glory was buried in the grave in Kosovo. The holy altars of God, which adorned Serbia as flowers for our emperors and kings, are today stables for Turkish horses. The image of our wives, sisters and daughters is trampled underfoot as if we were all real slaves. But, brethren, in the name of the Creator of God and our Saviour, let us rise up in arms! God will help us, and the tsar (Sultan) will approve it because these Dahije is also working against him!" When the Uprising began, Atanasije swore the people's leaders to mutual harmony and loyalty to Karađorđe. Although old, Atanasija took part in the first battle confronting the Turks in Drlupa. One group of insurgents was commanded by Karađorđe, the other by Priest Atanasije. Just before the battle, Father Atanasije addressed the insurgents as follows: "Brothers here comes the fight with the Turks. Do not, brothers, withdraw or be afraid. God is with us, so who else should we be afraid of? You swear to strike in unison and not to betray." The people replied, "Let us swear!".

The cross with which Atanasije Antonijević blessed Karađorđe's insurgents is now located at the Museum of the First Serbian Uprising.

== See also ==
- List of Serbian Revolutionaries

== Sources ==
- Тања ВИЋЕНТИЋ, "ПРОТА АТАНАСИЈЕ БУКОВИЧКИ", 1804, 11 (15)
