= Velimir Rajić =

Serbian lyric poet

Velimir Rajić (Serbian: Велимир Рајић; 20 January 1879 – 9 October 1915) was a Serbian lyric poet.

== Biography ==
Velimir Rajić was born at Aleksinac, Principality of Serbia, on 20 January 1879. At the age of four, he fell ill with epilepsy, a serious and incurable disease at the time, which marked both his life and his work. He finished elementary school, gymnasium and philosophical faculty in Belgrade. For some time he worked as a teacher at the Belgrade Gymnasium, and after that as an official at the National Library. Velimir Rajić was the great-grandson of the famous hero from the Second Serbian Uprising, Tanasko Rajić.

For Velimir Rajić the war years (1912, 1913, 1914, and 1915) were particularly painful. Ill health followed him from his earliest days, though tragic was his sudden death at Gornji Milanovac (at the time Kingdom of Serbia) when the Serbian Army was preparing to retreat in 1915. But it was no surprise to those that knew how he suffered. In their wake soldiers and refugees left innumerable bodies, each one evidence of a human tragedy and mental suffering: "Rajić died of a broken heart," wrote dramatist Branislav Nušić, who was himself an eyewitness to the dramatic struggles before the Great Retreat. Losing all hope was another writer Milutin Uskoković who took his life by drowning. Also, Milutin Bojić died in a Salonika hospital of consumption after experiencing the retreat over the Albanian mountains while Vladislav Petković Dis, perished at sea when a German torpedo struck his transport ship.

In 1908, Velimir Rajić was reproached by literary critic Jovan Skerlić for "the too dark, morbid, and almost clinical" tone of his poetry, but he did not deny him as an excellent poet. Skerlić did not realize that Rajić had a short time to live, plagued by ill health since childhood, now compounded with the ravages of war.

Velimir Rajić's first volume of verse -- Pesme i proza/Poems and Prose—is full of local colour and bold enjambement recalling all his harrowing experiences but, as the enfant terrible of the realists, Rajić had a sense of fun and wit which prevented him from taking himself or the pontificating Skerlić too seriously. His passion for his girlfriend Kosara Babić and their final parting (she married Gliša Elezović) reveal, however, a very different Rajić in Dan Tvog Venčanja (On the day of your wedding).

When, however, he fell in love and his love failed him, the essential duality of his nature shows itself. It is significant that Dan Tvog Venčanja (The day of your wedding) which sprang from heartbreaking experience are in dialogue form. His poems today are set to music and song.

In 1911 Vladimir Rajić led the special festive program commemorating the 50th anniversary of the founding of the Serbian National Theatre in Novi Sad. The program opened with a Prologue written by poet Rajić in the dramatic style of a tableau vivant commemorating the moment of the groundbreaking ceremony which took place in 1861.

The work of Rajić can be divided into two main parts, the first represented by his early poems, many of which were published shortly before the turn of the new century and the second comprising his later works, which were the poems he was preparing to publish at the moment of his untimely death.

While sick in a military hospital, he contracted typhus, and died in 1915.

== Works ==
- Book: Pesme i proza (poems and prose, 1908)
- Poem: Zavet (Pledge)
- Poem: Na dan njenog venčanja (On the day of her wedding)
- Poem: Srpska pesma (Serbian poem)
- Poem: Otadžbini (To Fatherland)
