= Aleksa Dukić =

Serbian hajduk and revolutionary

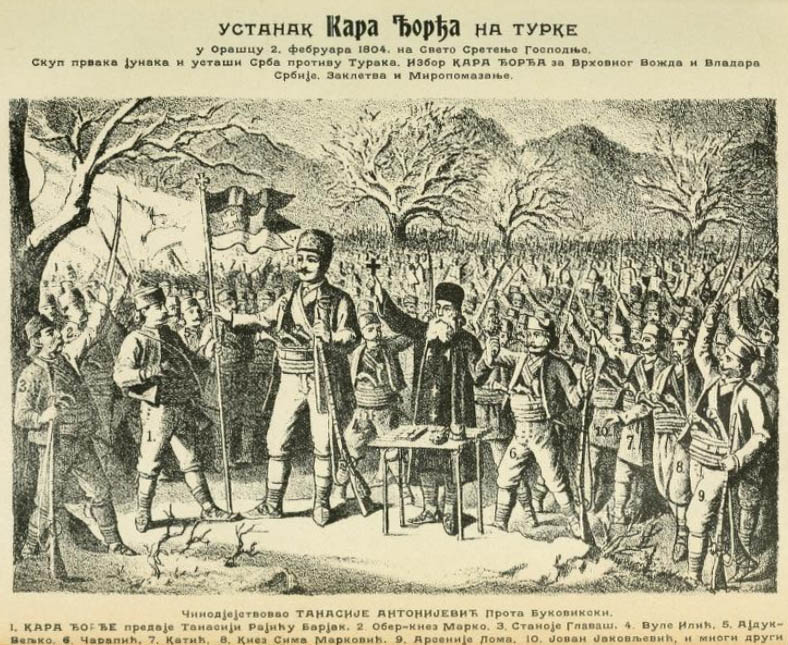
- Illustration of the Orašac Assembly from Život i dela Kara-Đorđa (1903).
- Born: Aleksa Dukić; Banja, Ottoman Empire (now Serbia)
- Military career
- Allegiance: Habsburg monarchy (1788–1791); Revolutionary Serbia (1804–13)
- Service years: 1788–1791, 1804–1813
- Rank: buljubaša (captain)
- Units: Serbian Free Corps (1788–1791); Karađorđe's unit (1804–13)
- Commands: Protection of Karađorđe
- Known for: hajduk, Austrian veteran, Karađorđe's bodyguard
- Conflicts: Austro-Turkish War (1788–1791), First Serbian Uprising

Aleksa Dukić (Serbian: Алекса Дукић; fl. 1788–1823) was a Serb hajduk (brigand), volunteer in the Serbian Free Corps that fought in the Austro-Turkish War (1788–1791), and revolutionary that participated in the First Serbian Uprising, notably being one of Karađorđe's bodyguards. He was said to have been short-tempered and sharp-tongued.

== Life ==
Dukić was born in the village of Banja, in the Jasenica knežina (Serb self-governing area) in the Kragujevac nahiya of the Sanjak of Smederevo ("Belgrade Pashalik"). His father was named Duka, and he had two brothers, Đorđe and Tanasije. He grew up tending to livestock. He was a hajduk who joined the Serbian Free Corps under Mihailo Mihaljević and fought in the Austro-Turkish War (1788–1791); his comrade was Karađorđe. Following the "Slaughter of the Knezes", the Dukić brothers and Tomković brothers (Sreten, Teofan, Jakov) of Banja were among those approached by Karađorđe to attend a secret meeting on deciding for rebellion against the renegade Janissaries (known as the Dahije) that ruled the Pashalik in tyranny and murdered notable Serbs. He participated at the Orašac Assembly (14 February 1804) where hundreds of influential Serbs met and decided on an uprising against the Dahije, led by Karađorđe. Dukić and Jakov Tomković were among those sent by Karađorđe to burn down the inns in their villages. According to Petar Jokić, Aleksa Dukić led a group of Banjans who burnt down the Topola inn and then Žabari inn, and then joined up with Jokić, numbering 70–80 men, who then burnt down the Jagnjilo inn, just prior to the assembly.

Dukić was a bodyguard (momak, pl. momci) of Karađorđe, and was promoted to buljubaša (captain) by him. There was a story that after a successful ambush near Sopot in 1804, Stevan Jovanović from Banja, who had distinguished himself, looted gold-woven robes which Dukić asked for him to hand over, but he refused, so Dukić accused him of not giving over the agreed tenth of spoils owed to the people; Karađorđe became enraged and shot and killed Stevan, and then wounded his parents after they cried over the body. After Karađorđe's brother Marinko stole the proceeds of a warehouse of salt and other necessities, and beaten up a girl, Karađorđe decided to hang him, with Aleksa Dukić throwing the rope on a tower. Dukić hoped Karađorđe would back out, and deliberately missed two times, with the third successful after Karađorđe threatened Dukić, holding his hand on his pistol.

After the rebel victory at Ivankovac against the Ottoman army, the Borak Assembly was held on 15 August 1805. Following the assembly, Karađorđe and Janko Katić went for Rogača to rest. On the way, Dukić shot at a villager with a carriage who did not give space on the road to the rebels.

In late July 1806, after Karađorđe destroyed Hasan Pasha at Beljin, Aleksa Dukić and three momci went with Miloš Pocerac and surveyed the area for Ottoman activity, and Karađorđe was informed on a meeting at Grušić for the collection of taxes and war necessities to the Ottomans, which the rebels crashed and received the collections from, and while camping, Karađorđe proclaimed Pocerac the vojvoda (general) of Pocerina.

Mladen Milovanović wrote a letter from Deligrad on 2 August [O.S. 21 July] 1813 to Karađorđe and the leadership at Topola regarding Ottoman activity in eastern territory, threatening Hajduk-Veljko, and the request that Antonije Pljakić come to aid. Dukić was sent by Milovanović to Topola to further inform of this.

With the suppression of the uprising in 1813, Dukić fled with others to Habsburg territory, and settled in Srem. Archimandrite Melentije Nikšić guested Dukić, Luka Radosavljević, Đorđe Vasić, Miloje Todorović, and others, at the Fenek Monastery. Dukić returned to Serbia following the Second Serbian Uprising (1815). Dukić wrote a letter dated 30 March 1823 to Prince Miloš Obrenović regarding his ownership of acorns and swines.

== See also ==
- List of people of the First Serbian Uprising

== Sources ==
- Batalaka, Lazar Arsenijević (1898). Историја српског устанка, део први [History of the Serbian Uprising: Part One]. Vol. I. Izd. Batalakinoga fonda – via Google Books.
- Jokić, Petar; Milićević, M. Đ. (1891) [1852]. Причање Петра Јокића о догађајима и људима из првог српског устанка. Споменик XIV. У Државној штампарији Краљевне Србије. pp. 17–18.
- Milićević, Milan (1894). Зановет: збирка разних састава. Štampariǰa Jove Karamata.
- Nenadović, Konstantin N. (1903) [1883]. Живот и дела великог Ђорђа Петровића Кара-Ђорђа. Vol. I (2 ed.). Belgrade: Штампа Савића и Комп. – via Archive.org.
- Novaković, Stojan (1904). Устанак на дахије 1804 [Uprising against the Dahije]. Штампано у Државној штампарији – via Archive.org.
- Prodanović, Dragoljub (2005). Хармонија у земљи Бодрића: Од науке до привреде. Графопак. ISBN 978-86-907117-2-7.
- Protić, Kosta (1893). "Ратни догађаји из првога српског устанка под Карађорђем Петровићем 1804—1813". Годишњица Николе Чупића. XIII. Državna štamparija.
- Vukićević, Milenko M. (1907). Карађорђе (1752–1804) [Karađorđe]. Vol. 1. Државна штампарија Краљевине Србије – via Archive.org.
