= Vule Ilić =

Serbian military commander

Vule Ilić Kolarac
- Вуле Илић Коларац
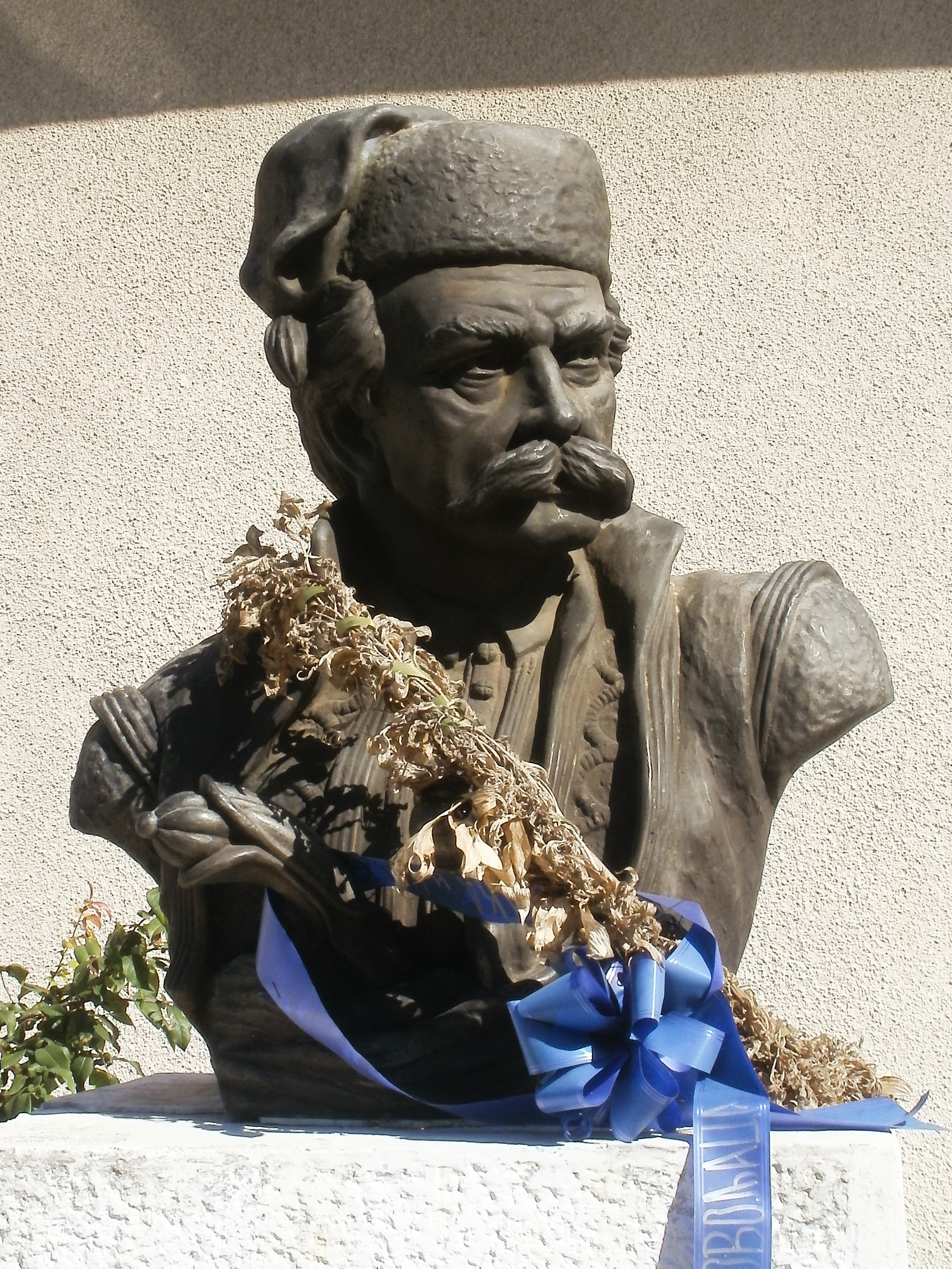
- Born: 1766; Kolari (modern Serbia)
- Died: 1834 (aged 67–68); Belgrade
- Military career
- Allegiance: Serbian revolutionaries
- Branch: Revolutionary Army
- Service years: 1803—1815
- Rank: Commander Vojvoda
- Nickname: Vule Ilić Kolarac
- Conflicts: First Serbian Uprising (1804-1813); Battle of Suvodol; Siege of Belgrade (1806); Hadži Prodan's Revolt (1814)

Vule Ilić (Serbian Cyrillic: Вуле Илић; c. 1766 –1834), known by the demonym Kolarac, was a Serbian military commander (vojvoda) who fought the Ottomans during the First Serbian Uprising. Vule Ilić Kolarac fought alongside hajduk Stanoje Glavaš then under Grand Leader Karađorđe distinguishing himself at the Battle of Suvodol and at the Siege of Belgrade. During the uprising he was commander of the city of Smederevo, the temporary capital of Serbia during that time.

== Life ==
Ilić was born in the village of Kolari, in the Sanjak of Smederevo. In the early 19th century, most of the Balkans was under Ottoman rule. Christian communities of Serbs lived under an oppressive system of forced assimilation, forced labor, harsh taxation and slavery; Oppression and violence filled the land after the Dahije started targeting the most prominent Serbs. On February 14, 1804, in the small village of Orašac, nearby modern Aranđelovac, Vule Ilić and other Hajduks gathered to discuss how to fight back and to keep Turkish rule and authority out of Serbia, Karađorđe Petrović was elected as the leader of the uprising, this event is known as the Orašac Assembly

In July 1806 Vule Ilić Kolarac fought at The Battle of Deligrad; the Turkish pasha Ibrahim ordered his commander to immediately go to Deligrad with 16,000 soldiers and take the city. Shait pasha, underestimating the quality of the fortification, as well as his military strength, arrived on July 13, with only 4,000 soldiers. Stanoje Glavaš and Vule Ilić, who at the time commanded the fortification, saw the enemies on time and easily forced them to withdraw. The Turks decided to await for reinforcement on a nearby hill but the Serbian rebels gathered people from the surrounding fortifications and with the help of peasants from nearby villages, surrounded the Turks and managed to throw them out of the highlands.

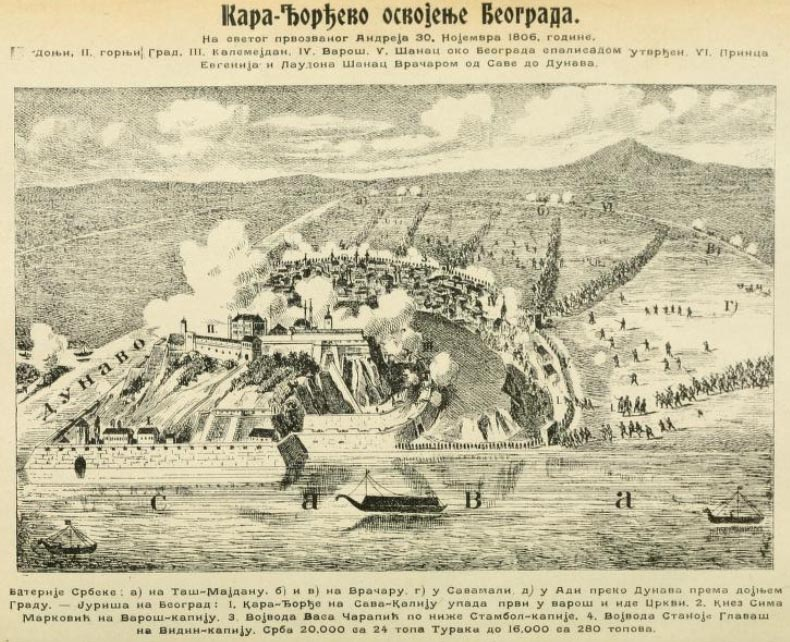
Siege of Belgrade 1806

The Siege of Belgrade started before daybreak on the 12th of December 1806. That morning Karageorge assembled in Vračar with 15,000 rebels, he had decided with the commanders that the attack should be carried out on St. Andrew's Day, during the Muslim feast of Eid al-Fitr, when the attention of the guards would be lower. The rebels separated into groups to attack the different entrances to the city. Miloje Petrović, Sima Marković, Vasa Čarapić, Stanoje Glavaš and Vule Ilić each leading a group. A Greek Albanian named Konda, who had switched allegiance, was well aware of the functioning of the Ottoman guard, he and Uzun-Mirko were in charge of taking over the Sava gate with a group of 6 volunteers, they climbed over the rampart and fell upon the guards. Four of the rebels were killed but the two remaining Serbs broke open the gate with an axe and the rest of the commando rushed in. At the same time Vule Ilić Kolarac and Stanoje Glavaš attacked the Vidin Gate penetrating from the other side with their men. Even though shots were fired, the Turks did not suspect that a Serbian attack was taking place but that shots were fired for the holiday. After a fierce battle the Turks took refuge in the citadel.

In late May 1809 Vule Ilić Kolarac participated at the Battle of Suvodol where Serbian rebels defeated an Ottoman army consisting mostly of Albanians. Serbian Cavalry under the command of Vojvoda Vule Ilić Kolarac attacked one of the Albanian wings with such force and surprise that it threw the Albanian forces in disarray as the cavalry were flanking them. Albanian forces attempted to regroup and attack the revolutionaries; however they were met with fierce gun fire from the Serbian cannons and infantry. In the midst of the fighting and poor visibility due to the fog, Vule Ilić Kolarac began to yell out in Turkish “our forces have retreated” in order to fool the Albanians into retreating. The ploy worked and threw Numan Pasha's forces into even more disarray. Battered by relentless attacks, the injured Numan Pasha and his forces retreated.

== Descendants ==
His grandson is General Sava Grujić five times Prime Minister of the Kingdom of Serbia whose daughters Marija married Cavalry Division General Vojin Tcholak-Antitch, descendant of Vojvoda Čolak-Anta, and Olga, lady-in-waiting to Princess Olga of Yugoslavia, married Professor Milivoje S. Lozanić, son of Sima Lozanić.

== See also ==
- List of Serbian Revolutionaries

== Sources ==
- Tihomir R. Djordjevic, "From Serbia, Prince of Milos", Belgrade, 1924, p. 133.
- Đ. Magarašević, "Traveling by Serbia", 1827, pp. 14–15
- Prota Matija, Memoari, p. 217 and 220, quoted by Tihomir R. Djordjevic, "From Serbia, Prince of Milos", Belgrade, 1924.
- Leopold Ranke, "The History of the Serbian Revolution, Part I", Belgrade, 1864 p. 128
- Sima Stojanović, "Old Serbian Food and Drink", cited in Vuk Vrcevic, "The Times for the History of the Black Mountain", National Book, Cetinje 1952 p. 111
- N. Petrović, Funds and Institutions, II tomstr 10,3 cited by Tihomir R. Djordjevic, Serbian Prime Minister Miloš, Belgrade, 1924 p. 148
