= Sikirica =

Coordinates: 43°46′40″N 21°25′10″E

- Village
- Interactive map of Sikirica
- Country: Serbia
- District: Pomoravlje District
- Municipality: Paraćin

Population (2002)
  - Total: 1,038
- Time zone: UTC+1 (CET)
  - Summer (DST): UTC+2 (CEST)

Sikirica is a village in the municipality of Paraćin, Serbia. According to the 2002 census, the village has a population of 1038 people.
