= Bukovik (Aranđelovac) =

- Village
- Location within Serbia
- Coordinates: 44°19′43″N 20°31′08″E
- Country: Serbia
- District: Šumadija
- Municipality: Aranđelovac

Population (2002)
  - Total: 2,743
- Time zone: UTC+1 (CET)
  - Summer (DST): UTC+2 (CEST)

Bukovik (Serbian Cyrillic: Буковик) is a village in the municipality of Aranđelovac, Serbia. According to the 2002 census, the village has a population of 2743 people.

== Notable people ==
- Jovan Krstović (Јован Крстовић), Serbian revolutionary in the First Serbian Uprising. Participated at the Orašac Assembly (14 February 1804) where hundreds of influential Serbs met and decided on an uprising against the Dahije, led by Karađorđe. Krstović was a member of the Kragujevac nahija army, Jasenica knežina unit.
