= Tanasko Rajić =

Serbian commander and revolutionary

Atanasije "Tanasko" Rajić
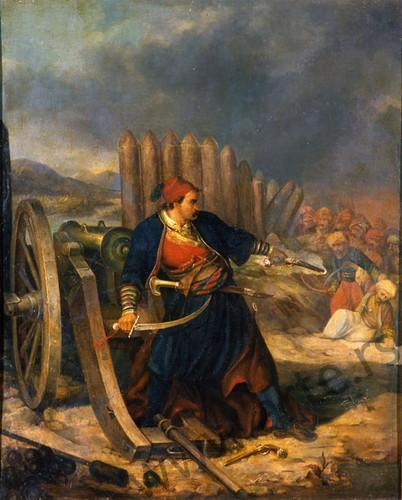
- "Tanasko Rajić na topu" by Rihard Puhta, 1862
- Born: Atanasije Rajić; 31 January 1754; Stragari, Sanjak of Smederevo (modern Serbia)
- Died: 6 June 1815 (aged 61); Ljubić, Revolutionary Serbia (modern Serbia)
- Military career
- Allegiance: Revolutionary Serbia
- Service years: 1804–1815
- Rank: barjaktar (flag-bearer) kapetan (captain) vojvoda (commander)
- Nickname: Tanasko
- Unit: Revolutionary army
- Conflicts: Siege of Rudnik; Battle of Čačak; Battle of Crni Vrh; Battle of Ljubić †

Atanasije Rajić (Serbian: Атанасије Рајић; 1754–1815), known by his nickname Tanasko (Танаско), was a Serbian vojvoda (commander) and revolutionary, the barjaktar (flag-bearer) in the First Serbian Uprising led by Karađorđe against the Ottoman Empire, and a captain in Obrenović's Second Serbian Uprising, during which he died (1815).

== Life ==
Atanasije was born on January 31 [O.S. February 11], 1754, in the village of Stragari, below the Rudnik mountain. As he was born on the slava (Serbian feast day) of St. Athanasius (Atanasije), he was named Atanasije.

He was a friend of Janićije Đurić, the later secretary of Karađorđe. One of his sons married Perunika, the younger sister of Đurić. With Karađorđe and other Šumadijan rebels, he clashed many times with the Ottoman Turks. In his area, Sali-aga was known for his cruelty. Tanasko gathers his friends and plans an attack on Sali-aga. He was part of the talks between prominent Serbs in planning the uprising. In the evening of Sretenje Gospodnje, 1804, Tanasko, Karađorđe, Stanoje Glavaš, Janićije Đurić, and 70 other armed Šumadijans arrived at Orašac. The next day, the Orašac assembly elected Karađorđe, leader of the Serbs. Karađorđe handed over a red and white war flag and appointed Tanasko the flag-bearer of the Serbian revolution.

After the outbreak of the uprising, Tanasko went to his home village and gathered and organized people for the siege of Rudnik which would follow. Tanasko was indignant to Sali-aga and promised that he would personally kill him and save Rudnik from violence. On 2 March 1804, the Serbian army led by Tanasko surrounded the city, demanding the surrender of Sali-aga. The Ottomans refused and prepared for battle, waiting for Kučuk Alija from Belgrade. Tanasko commanded the operation. Turkish reinforcements arrived from Čačak, resulting in a great battle on the outskirts of town. The Turks were defeated, with their horses and weapons seized. Tanasko was wounded in the arm.

Tanasko did not participate in forming the first state government. He remained a soldier, known for his bravery. Sali-aga was delivered to and beheaded by Tanasko. He further participated against the fightings against Alija Gušanac on the Morava river when he and his army fortified Crni Vrh near Jagodina and awaited Gušanac. Gušanac fled from the battle, and his army was disarmed. voivode Jovan Kursula also participated in this battle. After the victory, there was political arguing between Tanasko and Karađorđe, due to the leader's centralism. Tanasko returned to his village and stayed there until 1813. When Serbia faced serious difficulty, Tanasko reconciled with Karađorđe and planned the defence. After the failure of the uprising, Tanasko returns to his village, becoming a witness to Ottoman retaliation.

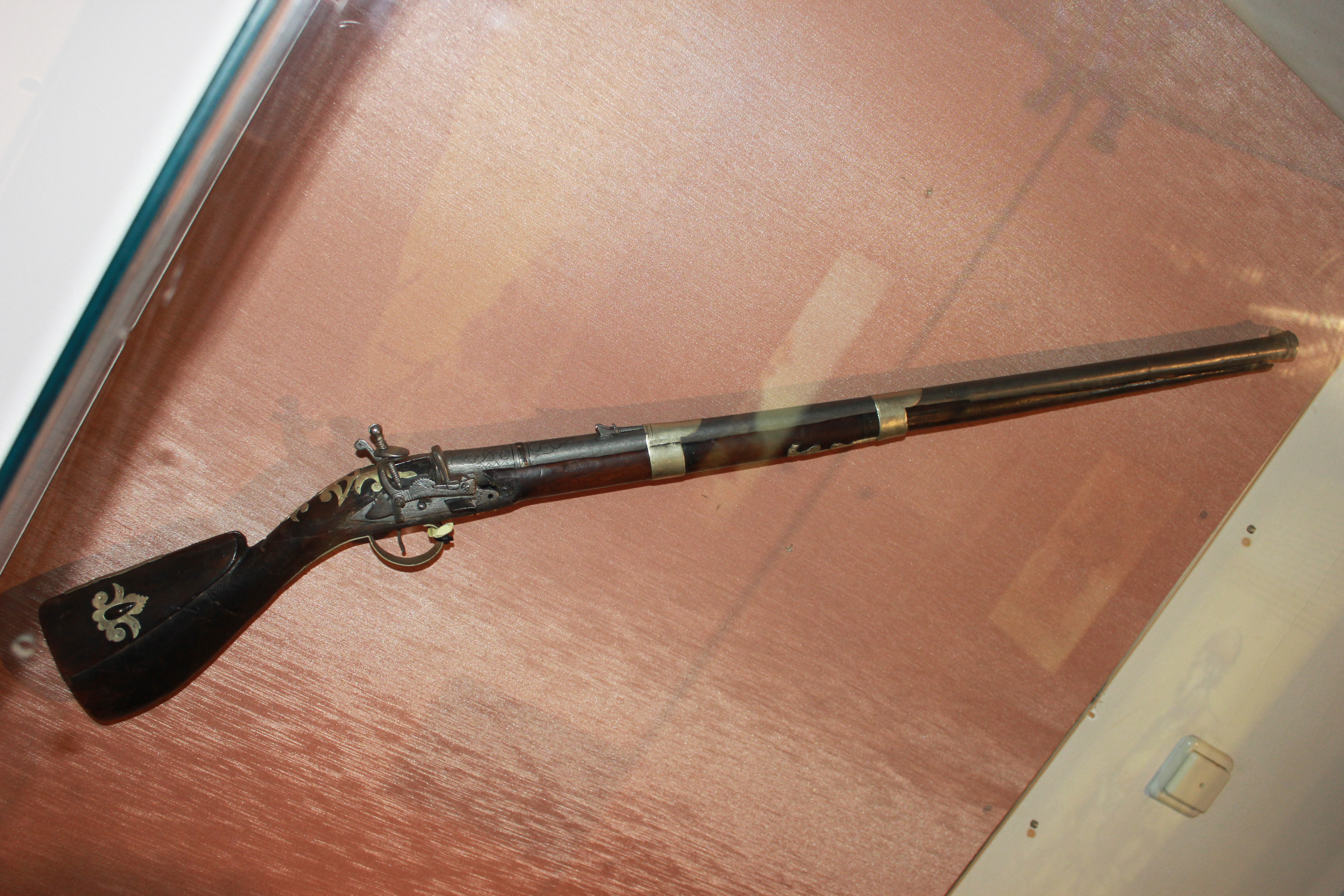
Tanasko Rajić rifle

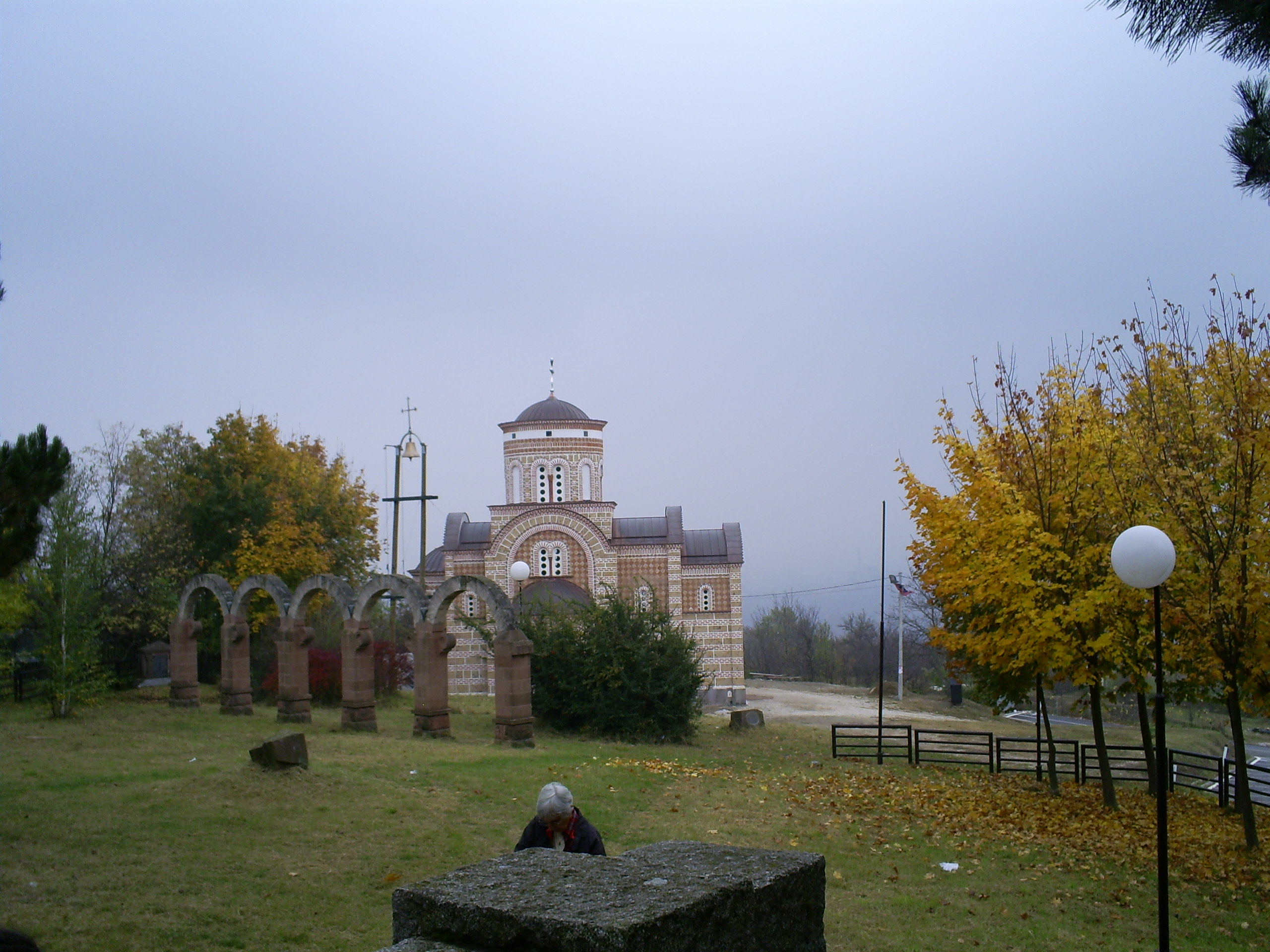
Serbian Orthodox Church in Ljubić.

Despite his advancing age, he immediately joined Miloš Obrenović's Second Serbian Uprising and returned to the battlefield. As chief commanders of the Serb rebels, Tanasko sought to expel the Ottomans from the Čačak nahija (district). On 6 June 1815, the two sides met at the Ljubić hill. The Ottoman commander Imšir Pasha went to destroy the Serbian positions near Čačak. The rebels hurried and fortified the trenches of Ljubić, 1.5 km north of Čačak, where Imšir was holding.

The battle began in the morning, with an Ottoman surprise attack on Serbian positions, and the Serbs managed in the beginning. Tanasko commanded the cannon batteries in the surrounding hills. Just before the battle, Tanasko was elevated to captain in Obrenović's Serbian army. In the beginning of the battle, Tanasko had successfully attacked the Ottoman positions, but Ottomans had his position encircled. The situation became difficult, and Tanasko held on to his cannons. When the Ottomans advanced on the trenches where Tanasko was situated, he continued to command, climbed onto a top and began to shoot at the Ottomans. The Ottomans surrounded him and had him cut into pieces. The Serbian army later gathered and won the battle. Imšir Pasha also died in the battle, and the Ottoman army retreated to Čačak.

== Legacy ==
A monument was erected in his honour on the hill of Ljubić, near Čačak, the site of the battle in which he fell. His weapons are held on display at the Military Museum, Belgrade.

Schools in Čačak (and Ljubić) and Pirot are named after him. Streets in Čačak and Kraljevo are named after him. A Yugoslav Army barrack was named after him, stationed in Čačak. The Cultural and Artistic Association from Ljubić is named "Tanasko Rajić". A local football team in Pirot is named "FK Tanasko Rajić".

His great-grandson was Serbian poet Velimir Rajić.

== See also ==
- List of Serbian Revolutionaries

== Sources ==
- Dojčilo Mitrović (1952). Tanasko Rajić, ustanički barjaktar i tobdžija. Prosveta.
- Tanasko Rajić, Karađorđev barjaktar. Dositej. 2008. ISBN 978-86-7644-044-3.
- Milica Baum, "Belgrade", A. S. Barnes, 1970, p. 87 (in English)
- Nebojša Damnjanović, Vladimir Merenik, "The first Serbian uprising and the restoration of the Serbian state", Historical Museum of Serbia, Gallery of the Serbian Academy of Science and Arts, 2004, pp. 72–74 (in English)
- Novosti Online, "Rano bez oca", 29 May 2006,
