= Orašac (Aranđelovac) =

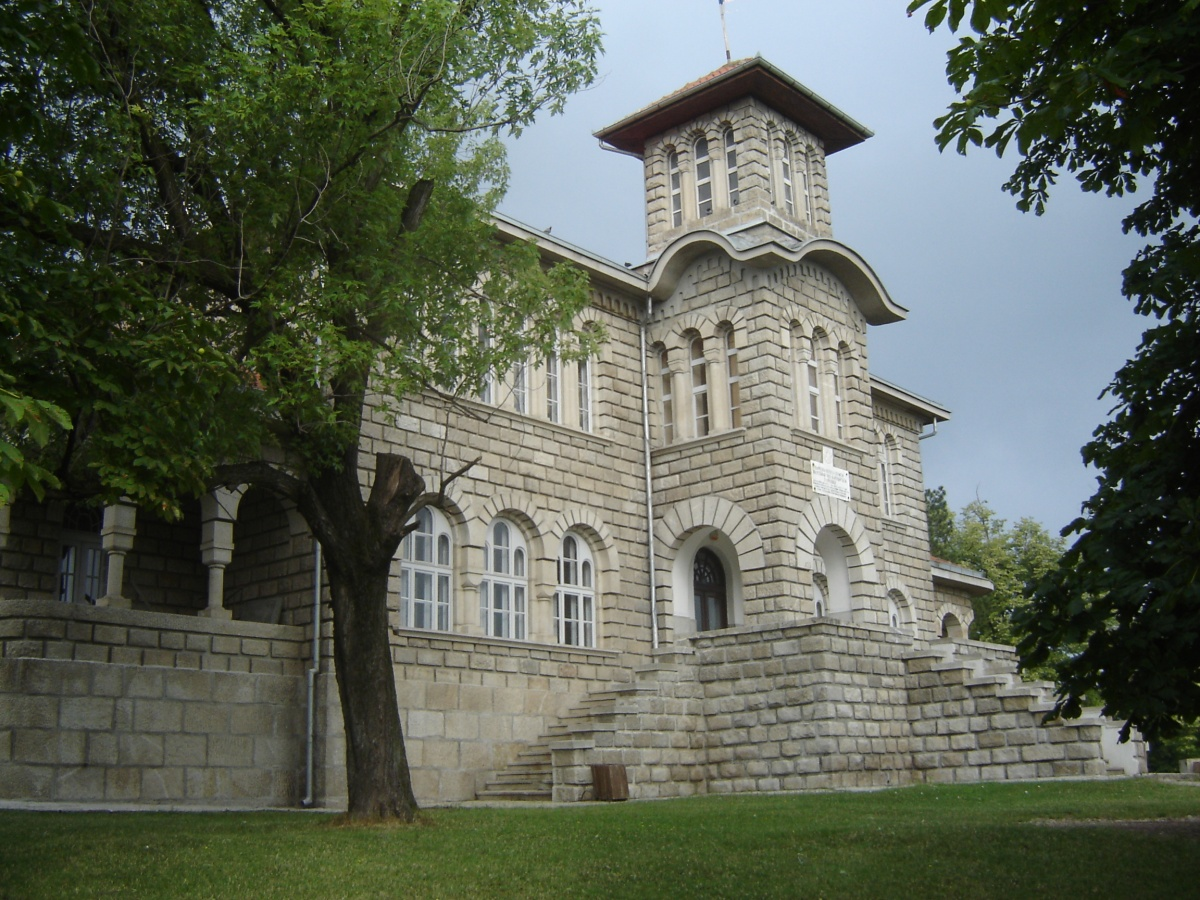
- School building in Orašac
- Interactive map of Orašac
- Coordinates: 44°19′44″N 20°35′07″E
- Country: Serbia
- District: Šumadija
- Municipality: Aranđelovac
- Elevation: 328 m (1,076 ft)

Population (2002)
  - Total: 1,462
- Time zone: UTC+1 (CET)
  - Summer (DST): UTC+2 (CEST)
- Postal code: 34308
- Area code: (+381) 34
- Vehicle registration: AR

Orašac (Serbian Cyrillic: Орашац) is a village in the municipality of Aranđelovac in central Serbia. According to the 2002 census, the village has a population of 1462 people. It is best known as the starting point of the First Serbian Uprising in 1804, as the site of the Orašac Assembly.

== History ==
The renegade Janissaries known as Dahije wrested power in the Belgrade Pashalik in 1800–1801. On 8 November 1803 Serb conspirators met in Orašac to plan an uprising. The Dahije learnt of the conspiracies to overthrow them in 1803, started monitoring the Serbs and then decided to kill Serb leaders in order to thwart a rebellion against them. The Slaughter of the Knezes in late January and overall bad state prompted the Serbs to rise up against the Dahije. The leading Serbs of the Belgrade and Kragujevac nahiyas decided to secretly meet at a secluded place near Orašac to discuss the uprising on 14 February [O.S. 2 February] 1804 (Candlemas, Sretenje). Among locals who participated at the assembly were Marko Savić, Teodosije Maričević, Aleksa Jakovljević, Gaja Ostojić, and others.

American anthropologists Joel and Barbara Halpern wrote an extensive body of papers and books about Orašac. The books include A Serbian Village (1958) and A Serbian Village in Historical Perspective (1986).

== Marićevića jaruga ==
Marićevića jaruga ("Marićević Gully") in Orašac is a memorial complex at the site where the First Serbian Uprising was agreed upon on 15 February 1804 and Karađorđe Petrović was chosen as the leader of the uprising (Orašac Assembly). Marićevića jaruga is visited every year by high-ranking Serbian state officials because the date when the rebellion started, 15 February, is celebrated as the day the modern Serbian state was founded. To commemorate the events related to the start of the uprising, the church in Orašac was built between 1868 and 1870, a Memorial School was built in 1932, a memorial fountain was built in the trench in 1954 to mark the sesquicentennial of the event, and a monument to Karađorđe Petrović was erected in 2004 to commemorate the bicentennial of the uprising. The sculptor Drinka Radovanović created the monument from white Aranđelovac marble. In 1979 Marićević Trench was added to the Historic Landmarks of Exceptional Importance list.

== Gallery ==
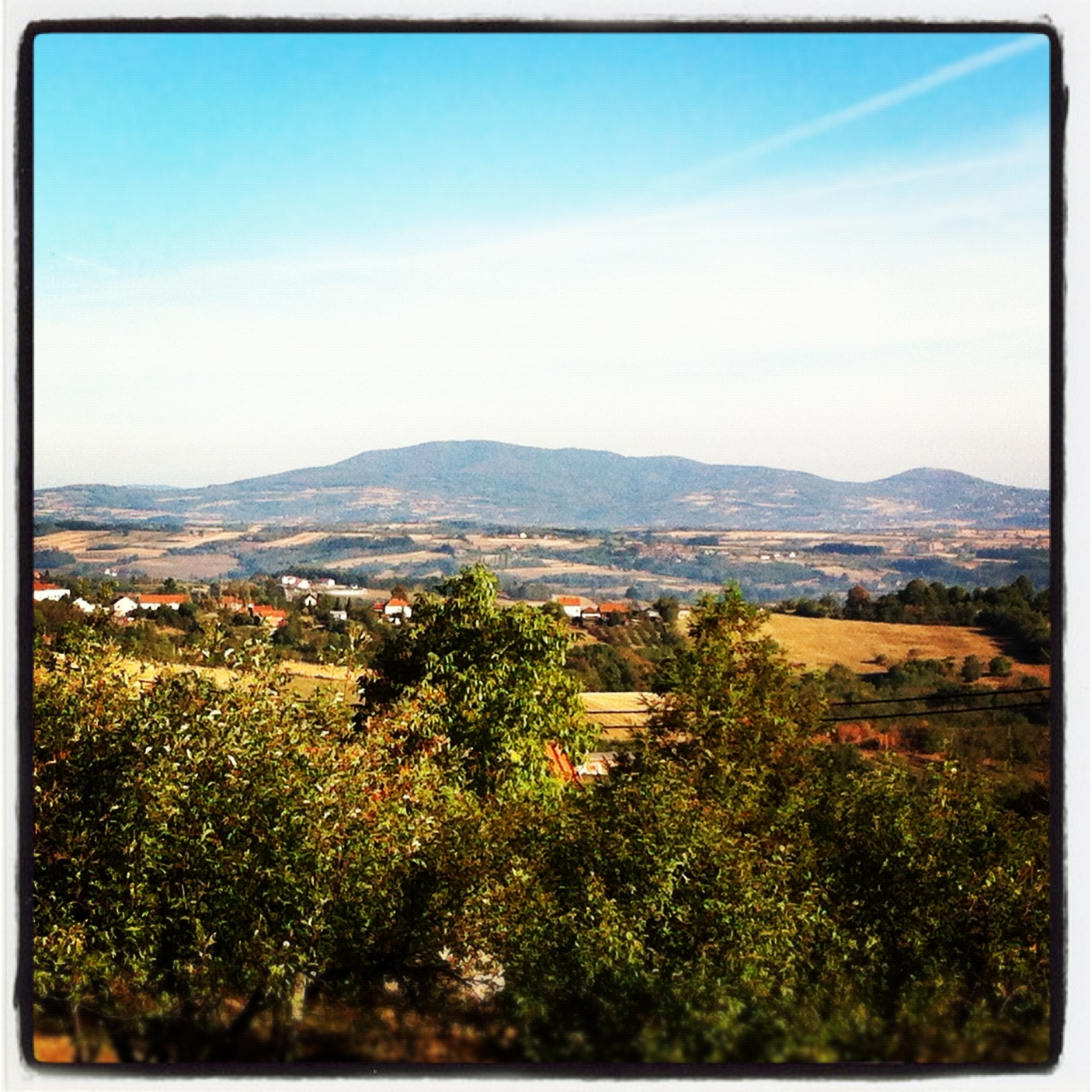
View over Sumadija in Orasac

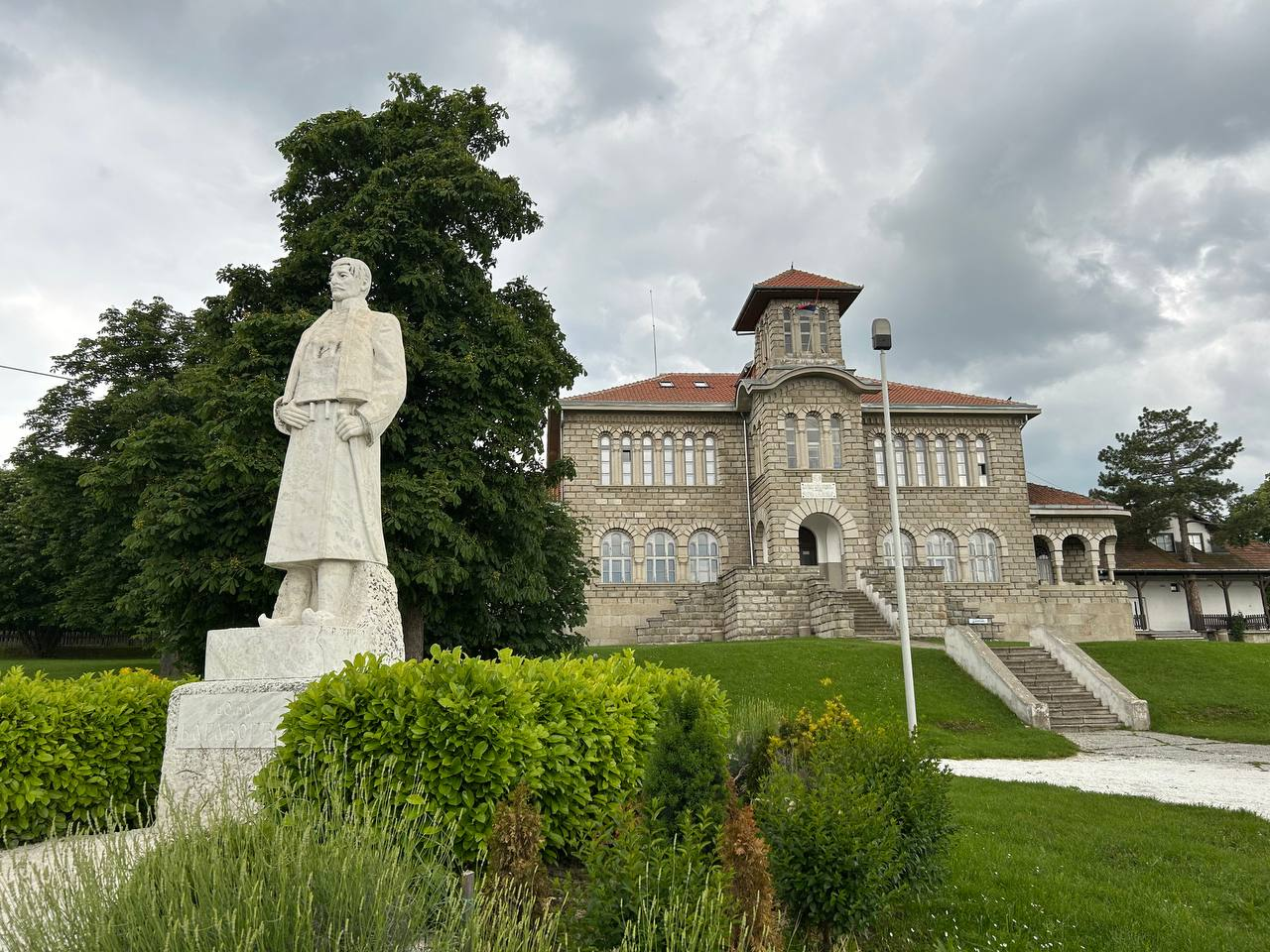
Karadjordje monument

== Sources ==
- Vukićević, Milenko M. (1907). Карађорђе (1752–1804) [Karađorđe]. Vol. 1. Државна штампарија Краљевине Србије – via Archive.org.
