= First Serbian Uprising =

1804–1813 rebellion in the Ottoman Empire

- Part of the Serbian Revolution
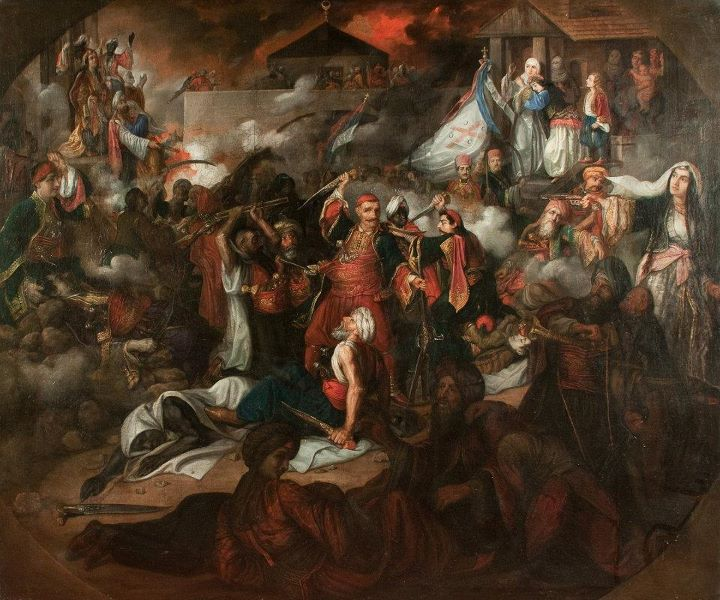
- The Conquest of Belgrade by Katarina Ivanović
Date	14 February 1804 – 7 October 1813 (9 years, 7 months, 3 weeks and 2 days)
Location	Pashalik of Belgrade, parts of the Sanjak of Vidin
Result	Ottoman victory (see Aftermath section)
Territorial changes	Abolishment of the Serbian rebel government

Belligerents
Revolutionary Serbia; Supported by: Ottoman Empire (1804–1805); Russian Empire (1807–1812)	Dahije (1804); From 1805: Ottoman Empire: Bosnia Eyalet Ayans; Pashalik of Scutari; Pashalik of Yanina; From 1813: Wallachia; Great Banship of Craiova

Commanders and leaders
(Revolutionary Serbia) Karađorđe; (Revolutionary Serbia) Matija Nenadović; (Revolutionary Serbia) Jakov Nenadović; (Revolutionary Serbia) Mladen Milovanović; (Revolutionary Serbia) Milenko Stojković; (Revolutionary Serbia) Stanoje Glavaš; (Revolutionary Serbia) Luka Lazarević; (Revolutionary Serbia) Vasa Čarapić †; (Revolutionary Serbia) Hajduk Veljko †; (Revolutionary Serbia) Miloš Obrenović; (Revolutionary Serbia) Petar Dobrnjac; (Russian Empire) Mikhail Kutuzov	Mehmed-aga Fočić †; Aganlija †; Kučuk-Alija †; Mula Jusuf †; (Ottoman Empire) Suleyman Pasha; (Ottoman Empire) Hurshid Pasha; (Ottoman Empire) Hafiz Mustafa Agha; (Bosnia Eyalet) Bekir Pasha; (Bosnia Eyalet) Sinan Pasha Sijerčić †; (Bosnia Eyalet) Osman Gradaščević †; (Bosnia Eyalet) Mehmed Bey Kulenović †; Ibrahim Bushati; (Wallachia) John Caradja

Casualties and losses
20,000 soldiers killed 60,000 civilians killed	70,000 soldiers killed

The First Serbian Uprising was an uprising of Serbs in Orašac against the Dahije, and later the Ottoman Empire from 14 February 1804 to 7 October 1813. The uprising began as a local revolt against renegade janissary officers who had seized power in a coup d'état against the Ottoman sultan. It later evolved into a war for independence, known as the Serbian Revolution, after more than three centuries of Ottoman Empire rule and brief Austrian occupations.

In 1801, the Janissary commanders assassinated the Ottoman Pasha and took control of the Pashalik of Belgrade, ruling it independently of the Ottoman Sultan. This led to a period of tyranny, during which the Janissaries suspended the rights previously granted to the Serbs by the Sultan. They also raised taxes, imposed forced labour, and made other changes that negatively affected the Serbs. In 1804, the Janissaries feared that the Sultan would use the Serbs against them, which led to the assassination of many Serbian chiefs. An assembly chose Karađorđe to lead the uprising, and the rebel army quickly defeated and took over towns throughout the sanjak, technically fighting for the Sultan. Sultan Selim III, fearing their power, ordered all the Pashaliks in the region to crush them. The Serbs marched against the Ottomans and, after major victories in 1805–06, established a government and parliament that returned land to the people, abolished forced labour, and reduced taxes.

Serbia's military successes continued over the years, spurred on by the Russian Empire's involvement in the parallel Russo-Turkish War. However, disagreements arose between Karađorđe, who sought an absolute monarchy, and other leaders who wanted to limit his power because some of his colleagues abused their privileges for personal gain. After the Russo-Ottoman War ended in 1812, the Ottoman Empire took advantage of these circumstances and reconquered Serbia in 1813.

Although the uprising was unsuccessful, the Serbs were the first Christian population in Ottoman history to rise up against the Sultan and succeed in creating a short-lived independent state. Their uprising eventually became a symbol of the nation-building process in the Balkans and inspired unrest among neighbouring Balkan peoples. The uprising soon resumed with the Second Serbian Uprising in 1815.

== Background ==
Serbia had been under Ottoman rule since the Battle of Kosovo in 1389. Over the centuries, the Serbs experienced oppression, heavy taxation, and cultural assimilation under the Ottoman Empire. By the 18th century, the conditions for Serbs living under Ottoman rule had become increasingly harsh. In addition to high taxes, they faced discrimination and the imposition of the Devshirme system, which required Christian families to provide sons for the Ottoman military. The Serbs lived in wide areas in the western Balkans; a high percentage of them, experienced fighters, had fought under their own officers in the Serbian Freicorps of the Austrian army. They came from the Sanjak of Smederevo (also known in historiography as the Pashalik of Belgrade), a border district containing a population of around 368,000 prior to 1804.

Belgrade, which was the seat of the eponymous pashalik became the second largest Ottoman city in Europe, with over 100,000 inhabitants, surpassed only by Constantinople. During the Austro-Turkish War of 1788, the eastern Šumadija region was occupied by the Austrian-Serbian Free Corps and Hajduks, which led to the occupation of most of the Sanjak of Smederevo by the Habsburg Monarchy (1788–1791). From 15 September to 8 October 1789, an Austrian force besieged the fortress of Belgrade. The Austrians held the city until 1791, when they returned it to the Ottomans under the terms of the Treaty of Sistova. The withdrawal was a disappointment for the Serbs, according to historian Theodor N. Trâpcea.

After the return of the sanjak to the Ottoman Empire, the Serbs expected reprisals from the Turks for their support of the Austrians. Sultan Selim III had entrusted the sanjaks of Smederevo and Belgrade to battle-hardened Janissaries who had fought against Christian forces during the Austro-Turkish War and other conflicts. Although Selim granted authority to the peaceful Hadži Mustafa Pasha in 1793, tensions between the Serbs and the Janissary command did not subside. In 1793 and 1796, Selim issued firmans that gave the Serbs more rights. These included the collection of taxes by the obor-knez (dukes), freedom of trade and religion, and the establishment of peace. Selim also ordered the removal of some unpopular Janissaries from the Belgrade Pashalik, as he saw them as a threat to the central authority of Hadži Mustafa Pasha. Many of the Janissaries were employed by or took refuge with Osman Pazvantoğlu, a renegade opponent of Selim in the Sanjak of Vidin. Pazvantoğlu launched a series of raids against the Serbs without the Sultan's permission, causing much instability and fear in the region. In 1793, the Serbs defeated Pazvantoğlu at the Battle of Kolari. In the summer of 1797, Mustafa Pasha was appointed by the Sultan as the beglerbeg of Rumelia Eyalet. He left Serbia for Plovdiv to fight against the Vidin rebels of Pazvantoğlu. During Mustafa Pasha's absence, Pazvantoğlu's troops captured Požarevac and besieged the Belgrade Fortress. In November 1797, the Obor knez Aleksa Nenadović, Ilija Birčanin and Nikola Grbović arrived in Belgrade with their troops. They successfully forced the besieging Janissary troops to retreat to Smederevo.

On 30 January 1799, Selim III allowed the Janissaries to return, calling them local Muslims from the Sanjak of Smederevo. At first, the Janissaries accepted the authority of Hadži Mustafa Pasha. However, in Šabac, a Janissary named Bego Novljanin demanded a surcharge from a Serb and murdered him when he refused to pay. Fearing the worst, Hadži Mustafa Pasha marched to Šabac with a force of 600 men to ensure that the Janissary was brought to justice and that order was restored. The Janissaries not only decided to support Bego Novljanin, but Pazvantoğlu also attacked the Belgrade Pashalik in support of the Janissaries.

== Prelude ==
On 15 December 1801, Belgrade Vizier Hadži Mustafa Pasha was executed by Kučuk-Alija, one of four Janissaries originally from the Sanjak of Vidin (modern north-western Bulgaria), the other three being Mehmed Foça-oğlu, Aganli-Bayraktar and Mülla Yusuf. The four Janissaries referred to themselves as Dahije. As a result, Belgrade was captured and the Sanjak of Smederevo was divided among them independently of the Ottoman government, and in defiance of the Sultan, despite the dispatch of a new Pasha from Constantinople.

The Janissaries enforced a system of arbitrary abuse unparalleled in the entire history of Ottoman misrule in the Balkans. The leaders divided the Sanjak into pashaliks, immediately suspending Serbian autonomy and significantly increasing taxes. Land confiscation and the introduction of forced labour, known as chiflik, prompted many Serbs to flee to the mountains.

The Serbs petitioned the Sultan to inform him of the tyranny they were suffering, upon learning of this and in an attempt to prevent a rebellion, the Dahije decided to act first. At the end of January 1804, throughout the Sanjak, between 70 and 150 knezes (village leaders), livestock merchants and Orthodox priests were executed by the Dahije in an event known as the Slaughter of the Knezes. According to contemporary sources from Valjevo, the severed heads of the leaders were displayed on the central square as a warning to those who might plot against the Dahije's rule. Janissary atrocities fueled fear and anger among the Serbs, leading some to flee with their families into the woods while others organised themselves into self-defence units, as uncoordinated resistance erupted throughout the region.

The events in Serbia were being closely monitored by neighbouring Christian states such as Wallachia, an Ottoman client-state bordering Serbia to the northeast, and ruled by the Phanariote Prince Constantine Ypsilantis (who was secretly hostile to Ottoman rule). During the early stages of the rebellion, the Belgrade Pashalik was visited by Ypisilantis' agents, including Dositei Filitti.

== Uprising against the Dahije ==
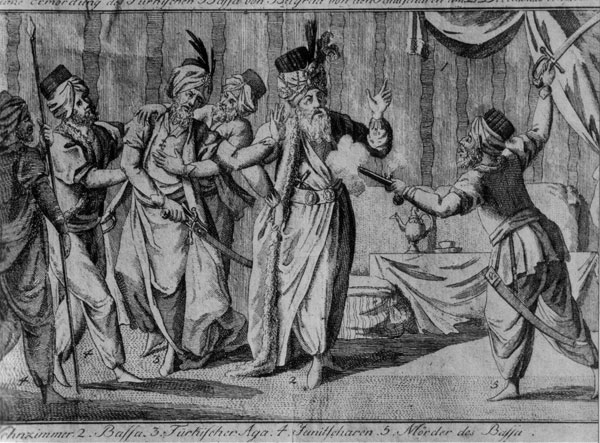
An illustration of Hadži Mustafa Pasha murdered by the Dahije

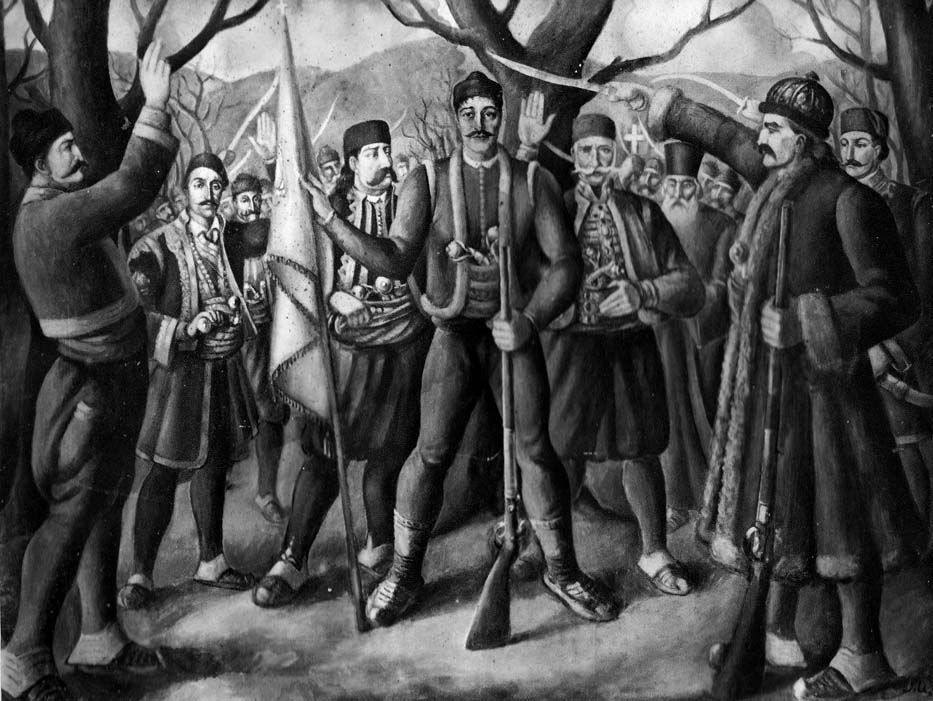
Orašac Assembly

On 14 February 1804, a group of leading Serbs gathered at Marićević Gully, in the small village of Orašac (near Aranđelovac) to support a call for a general uprising. The meeting was held after the massacre and the resentment against the Dahije, who had revoked the privileges granted to the Serbs by Selim III. Among those present were Stanoje Glavaš, Atanasije Antonijević, and Tanasko Rajić. They elected Đorđe Petrović, a cattle trader known as Karađorđe, as their leader. Karađorđe, a former member of the Freikorps during the Austro-Turkish War and an officer in the national militia, had considerable military experience. Serbian forces quickly took control of Šumadija, leaving the Dahije with only Belgrade under their control. The Istanbul government ordered the pashas of the neighbouring Pashaliks not to help the Dahije. At first the Serbs fought on the side of the Sultan against the Janissaries, but later they were supported by an Ottoman official and the Sipahi cavalry corps. Despite their small numbers, the Serbs achieved significant military victories, capturing Požarevac and Šabac and launching successful attacks on Smederevo and Belgrade in quick succession.

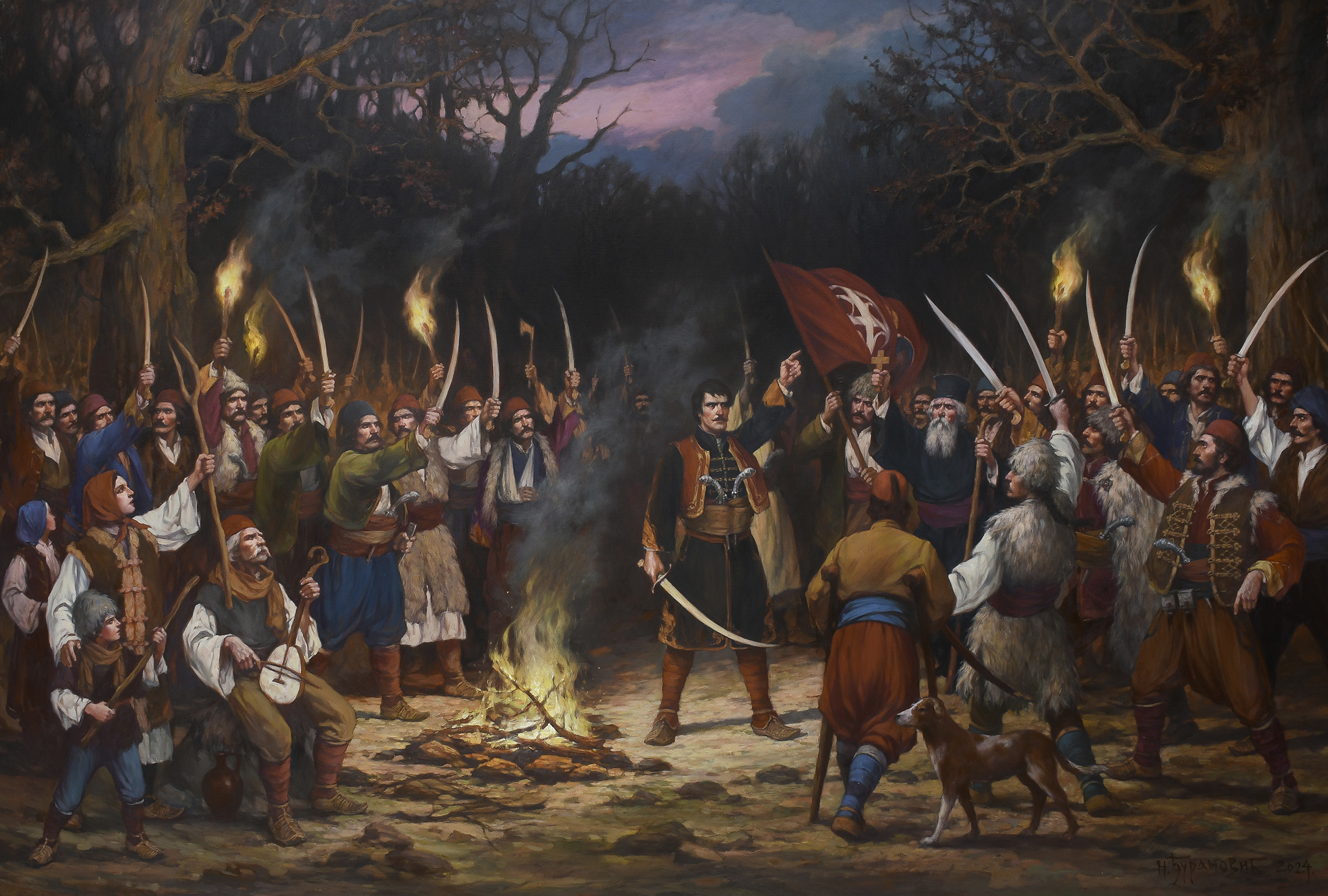
The Serbian rebel assembly at Orašac, after which inns in Šumadija were burnt down.

In July 1804, the Sultan, fearing that the Serbian movement might get out of control, sent Bekir Pasha, former Pasha of Belgrade and now Pasha of Bosnia Eyalet, to officially help the Serbs, but in reality to keep them under control. Alija Gušanac, the Janissary commander of Belgrade, faced with both Serbs and imperial authority, allowed Bekir Pasha into the city. The Dahije had previously fled east to Ada Kale, an island in the Danube. Bekir demanded the surrender of the Dahije. Meanwhile, Karađorđe sent his commander, Milenko Stojković, to the island. The Dahije refused to surrender, so Stojković attacked and captured them. He had them beheaded on the night of 5–6 August 1804. After destroying the power of the Dahije, Bekir Pasha wanted the Serbs disbanded. However, since the Janissaries still held important towns such as Užice, the Serbs were unwilling to stop without guarantees. In May 1804, Serbian leaders under Đorđe Petrović met in Ostružnica to continue the uprising. Their goals were to seek protection from Austria, to petition Sultan Selim for greater autonomy, and to request Russian protection from the Russian ambassador in Istanbul. The Russian government maintained a neutral policy toward the Serbian revolt until the summer of 1804 due to the recent Russo-Turkish friendship, which was a response to the growing influence of France. At the beginning of the uprising, the Russian envoy in Montenegro refused to deliver the message when the Serbs asked for help and instructed the Serbs to petition the Sultan. However, in the summer of 1804, after the meeting in Ostružnica, the Russian government changed its policy to be recognized by Istanbul as the guarantor of peace in the region.

Negotiations between the Serbs and the Ottomans began in May 1804, mediated by the Austrian governor of Slavonia. As Trâpcea notes, the Serbs made only modest demands, seeking autonomy within the borders of the Pashalik. This autonomy was to be under the control of a Serbian knez with the power to collect taxes for the Sublime Porte. In addition, the Serbian leaders demanded further restrictions on the Janissaries. In 1805, negotiations between the Porte and the Serbs broke down over the Porte's inability to accept an agreement guaranteed by a foreign power and the Serbs' refusal to lay down their arms. Fearing a Christian uprising, the Porte issued a decree on 7 May 1805, ordering the rebels to disarm and rely on regular Ottoman troops to protect them from the Dahije. The Serbs, however, summarily ignored the decree. Selim responded by ordering Hafiz Pasha of Niš, to march against the Serbs and take Belgrade.

== Uprising against the Ottomans ==
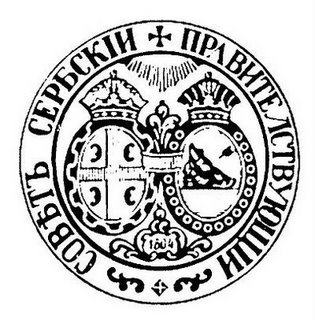
The seal of the Ruling Council (Praviteljstvujušči sovjet)

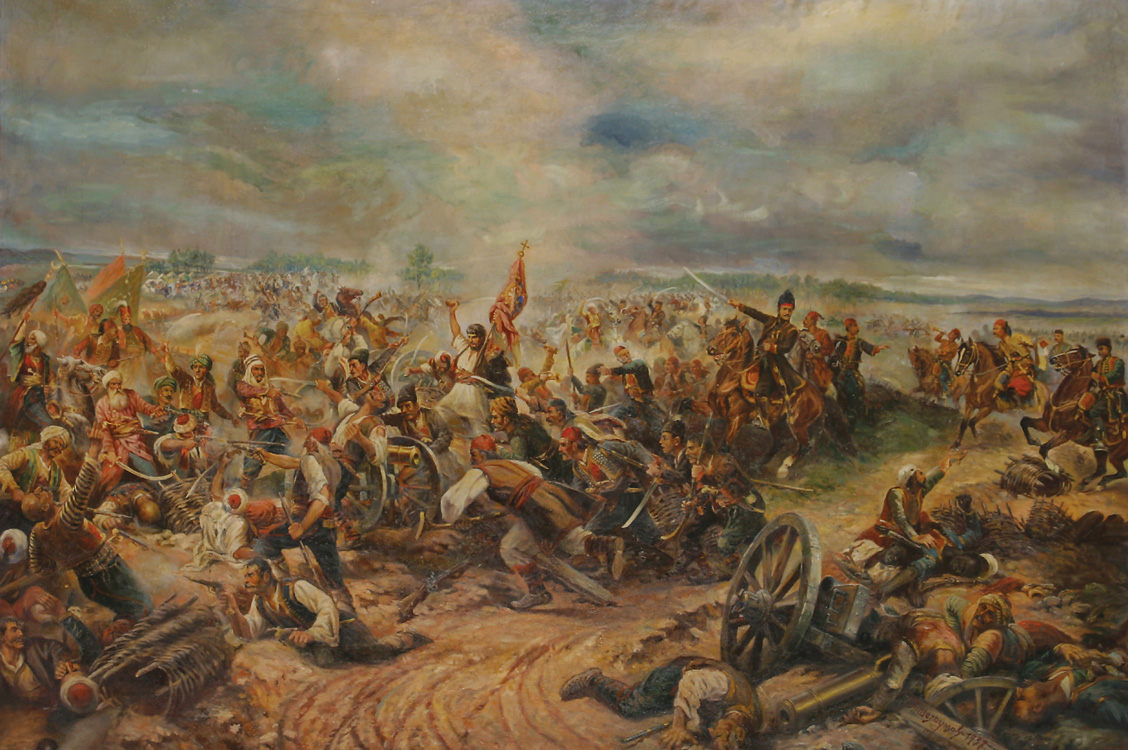
The Battle of Mišar (1806), by Afanasij Šeloumov

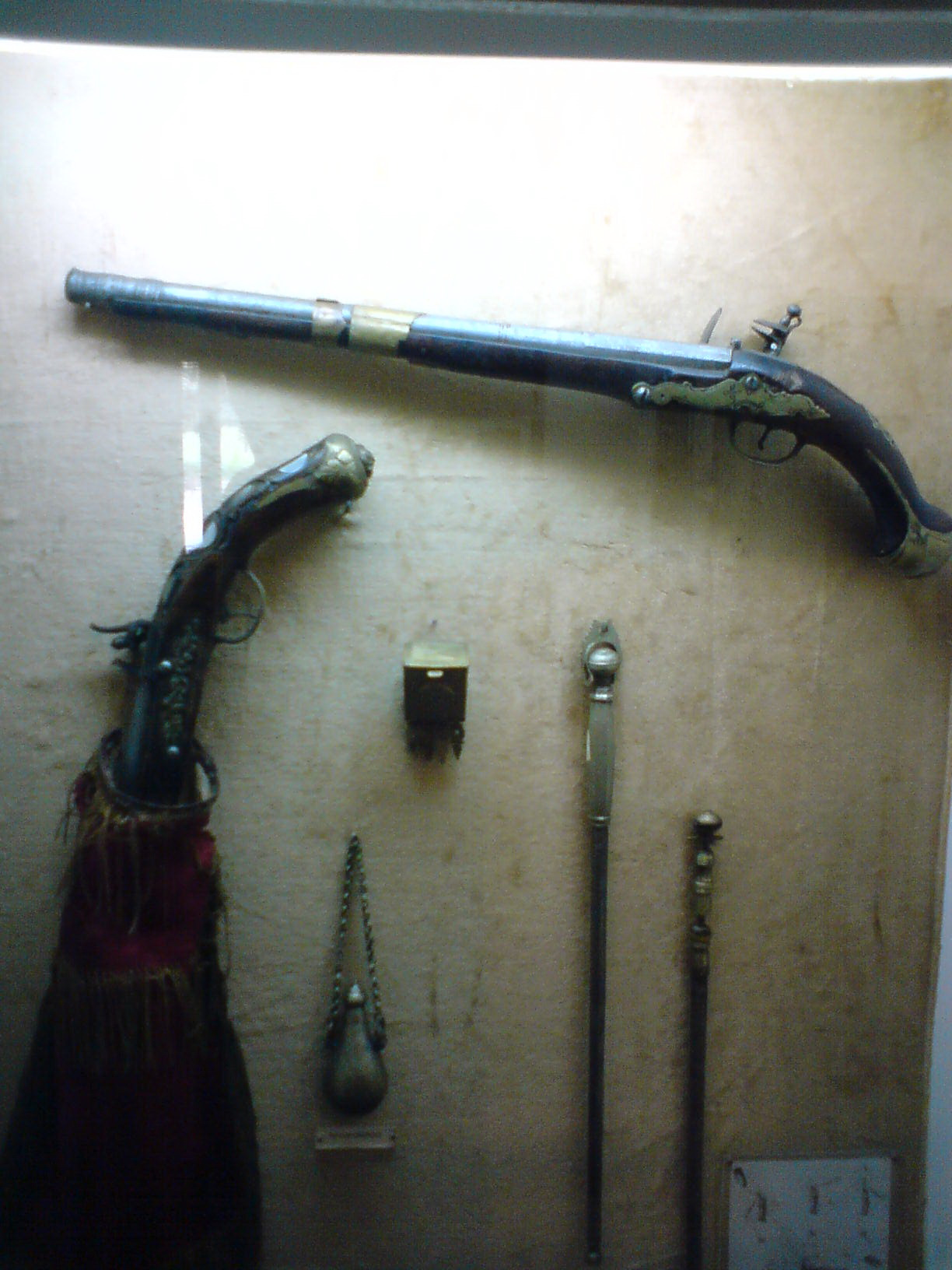
Flintlock pistols from the First Serbian Uprising

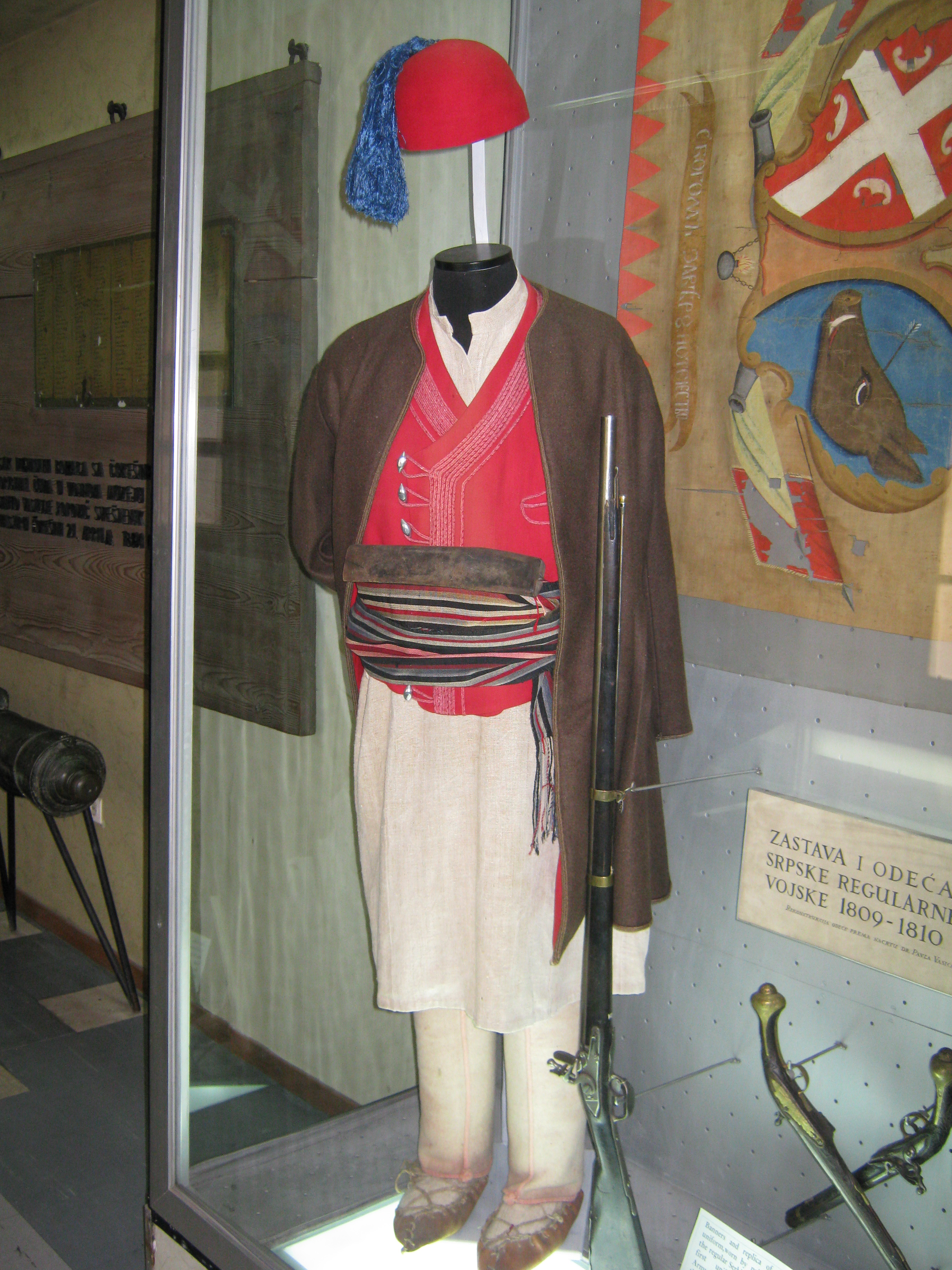
Uniform and weapons of a Serbian regular soldier (1809–10)

In 1805, the first major battle took place at Ivankovac, where the Serbs defeated the Sultan's army and forced it to retreat towards Niš. It was the first time that the Serbs defeated the Sultan's army and not a Muslim rebel force. In November of the same year, the fortress of Smederevo fell and became the capital of the rebellion. The second major clash was the Battle of Mišar in 1806, where the rebels defeated an Ottoman army from Bosnia led by the Sipahi commander Suleiman-Pasa. The rebels also defeated Osman Pazvantoğlu and another Ottoman army sent from the southeast at Deligrad. Despite repeated efforts and the support of Ottoman commanders, including Ibrahim Bushati and Ali Pasha's two sons, Muktar Pasha and Veli Pasha, the Ottomans were consistently defeated. In December 1806, the rebels, led by Petar Dobrnjac, captured Belgrade and gained control of the entire Pashalik. The rebels sent the Belgrade merchant Petar Ičko as their envoy to the Ottoman government in Constantinople. He succeeded in obtaining a favourable treaty named after him, the Ičko's Peace, which granted a measure of Serbian autonomy. However, Serbian leaders rejected the treaty and may have poisoned Ičko for his dealings with the Ottomans.

In 1805, the Serbian rebels established a rudimentary government to administer the lands under Serbian control. The government was divided into the Narodna Skupština (People's Assembly), the Praviteljstvujušči Sovjet (Ruling Council), and Karađorđe himself. The Ruling Council was established on the recommendation of Russian Foreign Minister Chartorisky and at the suggestion of some dukes, including Jakov and Matija Nenadović, Milan Obrenović, and Sima Marković. Their purpose was to check Karađorđe's powers. Boža Grujović, the first secretary, and Matija Nenadović, the first president, envisioned the council as the government of the new Serbian state. The revolutionary government was responsible for organizing and supervising various aspects of government, including administration, economy, army supply, law and order, justice, and foreign policy. In addition to abolishing forced labour and reducing taxes, they also abolished all feudal obligations in 1806, emancipating peasants and serfs and marking a major social break with the past. The poll tax on non-Muslims (jizya) was also abolished.

The Battle of Deligrad in December 1806 was a decisive victory for the Serbs, which boosted the morale of the outnumbered rebels. To avoid total defeat, Ibrahim Pasha negotiated a six-week armistice with Karađorđe. By 1807, the demands for self-government within the Ottoman Empire had evolved into a war of independence, supported by the Russian Empire. Combining patriarchal peasant democracy with modern national aspirations, the Serbian Revolution attracted thousands of volunteers among Serbs from across the Balkans and Central Europe. It eventually became a symbol of the nation-building process in the Balkans and provoked unrest among Christians in both Greece and Bulgaria. After a successful siege with 25,000 men in late 1806, Karađorđe proclaimed Belgrade the capital of Serbia on 8 January 1807, after the surrender of the remaining fortifications on St. Stephen's Day. The Serbian efforts were supported by the Imperial Russian Army, which had established itself in Wallachia during the parallel Russo-Turkish War and helped the Serbs defeat the Ottoman Turks at the Battle of Malajnica in July 1807. This allowed the Serbian rebels to concentrate on the Timok Valley, deep in the Sanjak of Vidin. A local rebel named Hajduk Veljko pledged his allegiance to Karađorđe.

Earlier rebellions against the Ottoman Turks were suppressed with great violence and repression. In February 1804, the Janissaries executed seventy-two Serbs and displayed their heads on the citadel of Belgrade. These actions led to equally brutal reprisals when the situation was reversed. The liberation of Belgrade was followed by a massacre of Turks. The event was described by the Serbian historian Stojan Novakovic as a "thorough cleansing of the Turks". After the Serbs finally stormed the fortress of Belgrade, Archbishop Leontii reported that the commander was killed "as well as all other Muslim inhabitants"; Turkish women and children were baptized. The slaughter was accompanied by widespread destruction of Turkish and Muslim property and mosques. A significant portion of those killed were not of actual Turkish descent, but were local Slavs who had converted to Islam over the centuries. The massacre sparked a debate within the rebel faction. The older generation of rebels viewed the massacre as a sin, but the prevailing principle was the removal of all Muslims.

In 1808, Sultan Selim was executed by Mustafa IV, who was subsequently deposed by Mahmud II. During this political crisis, the Ottomans were willing to offer significant autonomy to the Serbs. However, the talks did not lead to an agreement between the two parties, as they could not agree on the exact borders of Serbia. Karađorđe's 1809 proclamation in the capital, Belgrade, is considered the culmination of the first phase. The proclamation called for national unity and invoked Serbian history to call for the establishment of religious freedom and a written rule of law. It also urged Serbs to stop paying taxes to the Porte, which were considered discriminatory on the basis of religious affiliation. Karađorđe declared himself the hereditary supreme leader of Serbia but agreed to cooperate with the Governing Council, which also served as the supreme court. During the Ottoman-Russian War of 1809, Karađorđe was initially willing to support Russia, but their cooperation proved ineffective. Although Karađorđe launched a successful offensive at Novi Pazar, Serbian forces were later defeated at the Battle of Čegar.

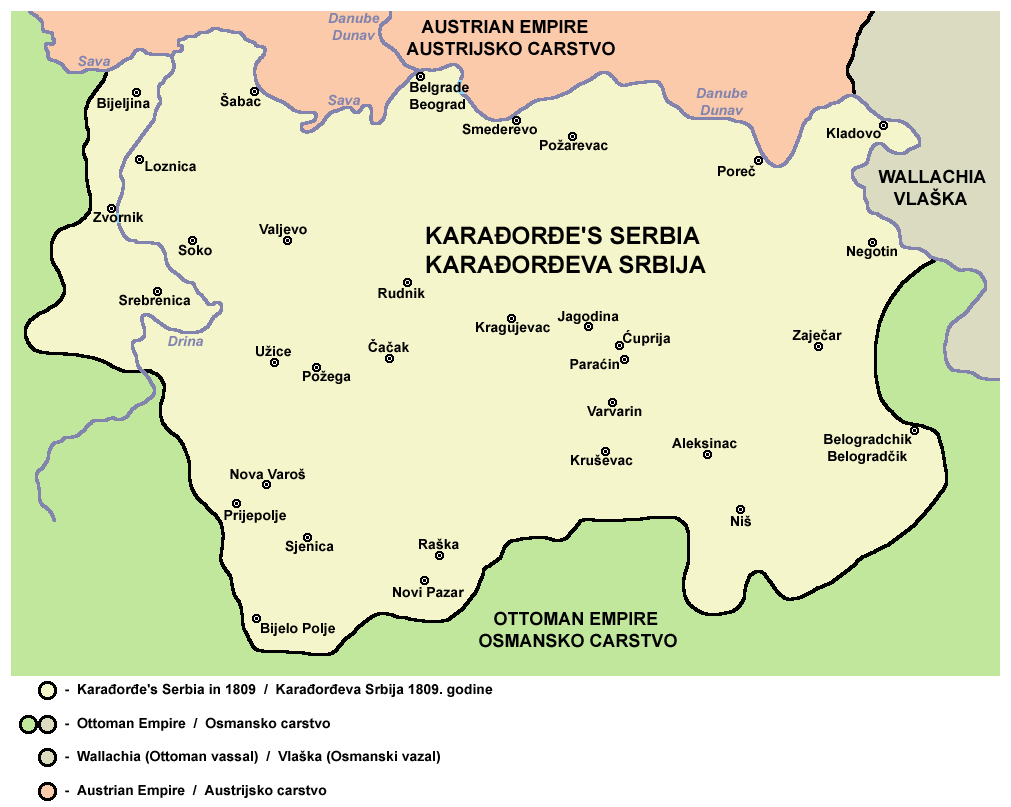
Serbia in 1809 under Karađorđe's rule

In March 1809, Hurşid Paşa was sent to the Sanjak of Smederevo to suppress the rebellion. The Ottoman force was composed of soldiers from various nearby pashaliks, mostly from Bosnia and Albania (Scutari, Yanina), including soldiers such as Samson Cerfberr of Medelsheim, Osman Gradaščević, and Reshiti Bushati. On 19 May 1809, a large Ottoman force attacked 3,000 rebels led by commander Stevan Sinđelić on the hill of Čegar, near the town of Niš. Due to the lack of coordination between the commanders, the reinforcement of other detachments failed. Despite their numerical superiority, the Ottoman forces lost thousands of men in numerous attacks on the Serbian positions. Eventually, the rebels were overwhelmed, and their positions were overrun. To prevent his men from being captured and impaled, Sinđelić fired into the gunpowder magazine of his entrenchment, causing an explosion that killed all the rebels and Ottoman troops in the vicinity. Afterwards, Hurshid Pasha ordered the construction of a tower made from the skulls of Serbian revolutionaries. The resulting Skull Tower stands ten feet tall and contains 952 Serbian skulls embedded in 14 rows on all four sides. In July 1810, Russian troops arrived in Serbia for the second time. This time they provided military cooperation by sending weapons, ammunition and medical supplies. Marshal Mikhail Kutuzov also participated in planning joint actions. Russian support raised hopes of a Serbian victory. In August 1809, an Ottoman army marched on Belgrade, causing a mass exodus of people across the Danube. Among them was the Russian agent Radofinikin. Faced with the impending disaster, Karađorđe sought help from the Habsburgs and Napoleon, but to no avail. At this point, the Serbian rebels shifted to a defensive strategy, focusing on holding their territories rather than making further gains. Meanwhile, Russia, preoccupied with a French invasion, prioritized signing a final peace treaty and acted against Serbia's interests. In particular, the Serbs were not informed of the negotiations and only learned of the final terms from the Ottomans. This second Russian retreat occurred at the height of Karađorđe's power and the rise of Serbian expectations. The Treaty of Bucharest, signed in May 1812, contained Article 8, which dealt with the Serbs. According to the treaty, Serbian fortifications were to be destroyed unless they were of value to the Ottomans. Pre-1804, Ottoman installations were to be reoccupied and garrisoned by Ottoman troops. In return, the Porte promised a general amnesty and certain autonomous rights. The Serbs were granted control over the administration of their own affairs and the collection and payment of a fixed tribute. The reaction in Serbia was strong, with particular concern over the reoccupation of fortresses and towns and the expectation of feared reprisals.

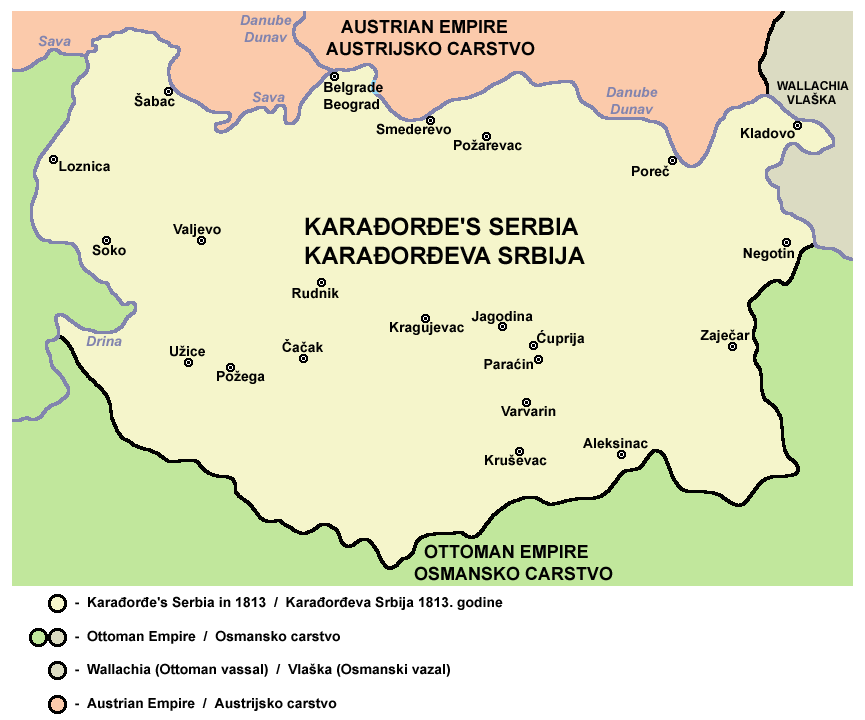
Serbia in 1813, before the Ottoman reconquest

During the rebellion, some of the leaders abused their privileges for personal gain. Disagreements arose between Karađorđe and other leaders as Karađorđe sought absolute power while his dukes sought to limit it. After retaking Belgrade, the Ottoman Empire took advantage of the Russian retreat to reconquer Serbia in 1813. As part of this effort, Wallachia was also recaptured and secured by the Ottomans under the loyalist Phanariote John Caradja, along with its Great Banship (Oltenia). In July 1813, an Ottoman–Wallachian force, including "several hundreds of Caradja's Romanians" arriving in through Oltenia, moved up the Timok River and killed Veljko at Negotin. The Ottoman forces burned villages along the main invasion routes, massacred or displaced their inhabitants, and enslaved many women and children. Karađorđe and other rebel leaders fled the country, and the exiles scattered throughout the Austrian Empire, Wallachia, and Russia.

== Aftermath ==
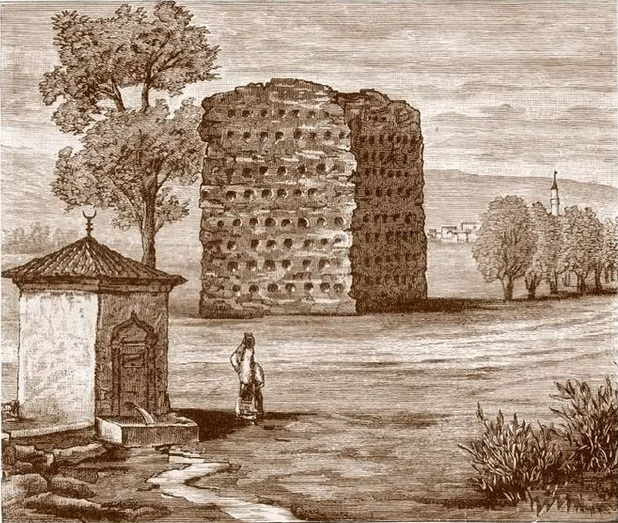
The Skull Tower built by the Turks with embedded Serbian skulls, as depicted in an 1863 sketch by Felix Philipp Kanitz

As a clause of the Treaty of Bucharest, the Ottomans agreed to grant a general amnesty to the participants of the uprising. However, as soon as Turkish rule was re-established in Serbia, villages were burned and thousands were sent into the Ottoman slave trade. Belgrade became the scene of brutal vengeance. On 17 October 1813 alone, 1,800 women and children were sold into slavery in the Ottoman Empire. Various acts of violence and confiscation of property also took place. Islamized Serbs and Albanians in particular participated in such actions.

Under direct Ottoman rule, all Serbian institutions were abolished. In 1814, tensions continued and Hadži Prodan, one of Karađorđe's former commanders, launched a failed uprising. After an uprising at a Turkish estate in the same year, the Ottoman authorities massacred the local population and publicly impaled 200 prisoners in Belgrade. In March 1815, the Serbs held several meetings and organized to resist again. This led to the Second Serbian Uprising in April, led by Miloš Obrenović. The uprising eventually succeeded in turning Serbia into a semi-autonomous state.

== See also ==
- List of Serbian Revolutionaries
- Timeline of the Serbian Revolution

== Sources ==
- Berend, I.T. (2005). History Derailed: Central and Eastern Europe in the Long Nineteenth Century. University of California Press. ISBN 978-0-520-24525-9.
- Ćorović, Vladimir (2001) [1997]. Историја српског народа (in Serbian). Belgrade: Јанус.
- Čubrilović, Vasa (1982). Istorija političke misli u Srbiji XIX veka. Narodna knjiga.
- Djokić, D. (2023). A Concise History of Serbia. Cambridge Concise Histories. Cambridge University Press. ISBN 978-1-009-30865-6.
- Glenny, M. (2012). The Balkans: Nationalism, War, and the Great Powers, 1804–2011. Penguin Publishing Group. ISBN 978-1-101-61099-2.
- Janković, Dragoslav (1955). Istorija države i prava Srbije u XIX veku. Nolit.
- Jelavich, Barbara (1983). History of the Balkans. Cambridge University Press. ISBN 978-0-521-27458-6.
- Jelavich, Charles; Jelavich, Barbara (1977). The Establishment of the Balkan National States: 1804-1920. University of Washington Press. ISBN 978-0-295-80360-9.
- Jelavich, B.; Cambridge University Press; Joint Committee of Eastern Europe; Joint Committee on Eastern Europe (1983). History of the Balkans: Volume 1. Cambridge paperback library. Cambridge University Press. ISBN 978-0-521-27458-6.
- Judah, T. (1997). The Serbs: History, Myth, and the Destruction of Yugoslavia. Yale University Press. ISBN 978-0-300-07113-9.
- Mojzes, P. (2011). Balkan Genocides: Holocaust and Ethnic Cleansing in the Twentieth Century. G – Reference, Information and Interdisciplinary Subjects Series. Rowman & Littlefield. ISBN 978-1-4422-0663-2.
- Morison, W. A. (2012) [1942]. The Revolt of the Serbs Against the Turks: (1804–1813). Cambridge University Press. ISBN 978-1-107-67606-0.
- Paxton, R.V. (1968). Russia and the First Serbian Revolution: a Diplomatic and Political Study, the Initial Phase, 1804-1807. Stanford University.
- Petrovich, Michael Boro (1976). A history of modern Serbia, 1804–1918. Harcourt Brace Jovanovich. ISBN 9780151409501.
- Protić, Kosta (1893). "Ратни догађаји из Првога српског устанка 1804-1813 под вождом Карађорђем Петровићем". Godišnjica Nikole Čupića. XIII: 77–269.
- Ranke, Leopold von (1847). History of Servia, and the Servian Revolution. J. Murray. (Public Domain)
- Srđan Rudić, S.A.; Belgrade 1521–1867, D.; The Institute of History, B.; Yunus Emre Enstitüsü, T.C.C.B.; Ćosović, T. (2018). Belgrade 1521–1867. Collection of Works / The Institute of History, Belgrade. Institute of History Belgrade. ISBN 978-86-7743-132-7.
- Trâpcea, Theodor N. (1942). "Contribuțiuni la istoria românilor din Peninsula Balcanică. Românii dintre Timoc și Morava". Balcania. V (1): 207–364.
