= Jelovik =

Jelovik may refer to:

- Jelovik (Aranđelovac), a village in Serbia
- Jelovik (Bajina Bašta), a village in Serbia
