= Stojnik =

Stojnik may refer to:

- Stojnik (Aranđelovac), a village in Serbia
- Stojnik (Sopot), a village in Serbia
