= Tulež =

- Village
- Location within Serbia
- Coordinates: 44°25′01″N 20°26′37″E
- Country: Serbia
- District: Šumadija
- Municipality: Aranđelovac

Population (2002)
  - Total: 761
- Time zone: UTC+1 (CET)
  - Summer (DST): UTC+2 (CEST)

Tulež (Serbian Cyrillic: Тулеж) is a village in the municipality of Aranđelovac, Serbia. According to the 2002 census, the village has a population of 761 people. According to the 2022 census, it has 584 inhabitants.
