= Venčane =

- Village
- Location within Serbia
- Coordinates: 44°24′24″N 20°28′04″E
- Country: Serbia
- District: Šumadija
- Municipality: Aranđelovac

Population (2002)
  - Total: 1,576
- Time zone: UTC+1 (CET)
  - Summer (DST): UTC+2 (CEST)

Venčane (Serbian Cyrillic: Венчане) is a village in the municipality of Aranđelovac, Serbia. According to the 2002 census, the village has a population of 1576 people.
