= Staro Zdanje =

Building in Aranđelovac, Serbia

Coordinates: 44.3089°N 20.5541°E

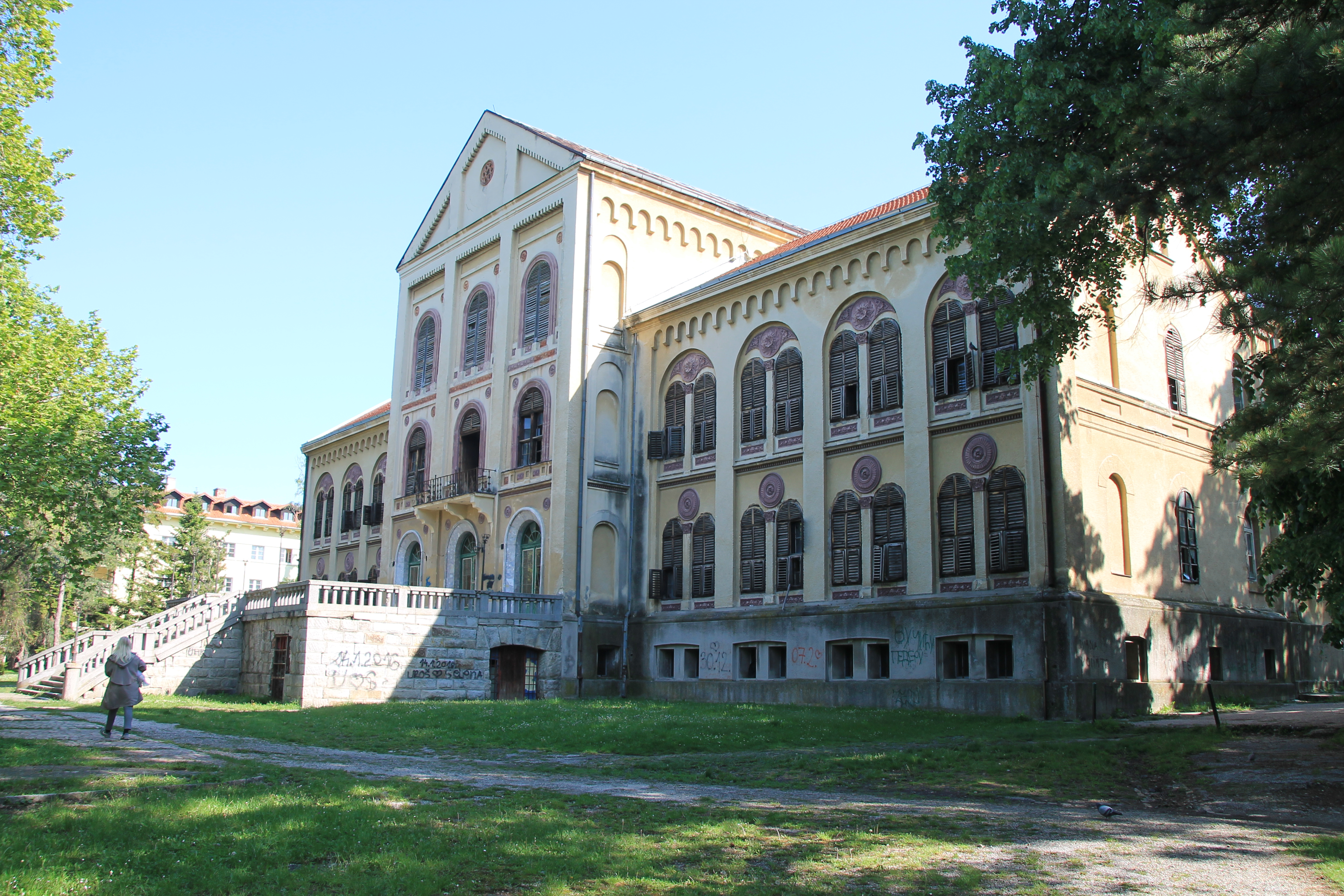
- Interactive map of the Staro Zdanje area

General information
- Location: Aranđelovac, Serbia
- Year built: 1859

Design and construction
- Architect: Kosta Šreplović

Staro Zdanje (Serbian: Старо здање, lit. 'Old Building') is an abandoned hotel building located in Aranđelovac, Serbia. Construction was commissioned by prince Mihailo Obrenović in 1868, designed by Munich-trained architect Kosta Šreplović. Staro Zdanje is a unique cultural monument; during the 19th century, alongside Captain Miša's Mansion in Belgrade, it was considered one of the most beautiful and largest buildings in Serbia.

== History ==
Staro Zdanje represents one of the finest examples of Serbian Romantic architecture. Spanning 9,000 m², it was originally conceived as the Assembly of the Principality of Serbia; however, following the relocation of the capital from Kragujevac to Belgrade, Staro Zdanje became a palace — a summer residence of the Obrenović dynasty.

The most impressive part of the palace is the ballroom, known as the Prince's Hall. The hall features a central chandelier composed of numerous crystal fragments, surrounded by four smaller chandeliers. Staro Zdanje houses valuable art collections of paintings, as well as furniture. During the reigns of King Milan and King Alexander Obrenović, grand balls were held here that were talked about throughout Serbia. It was in this hall that young officer Živojin Mišić met his future wife, the German-born Louise, at one of these balls.

After the May coup in 1903, Staro Zdanje started losing importance.

It was not until 1906, when the railway line from Belgrade to Aranđelovac was completed, that Staro Zdanje became a hotel, as guests began arriving daily by train from Belgrade.

Staro Zdanje is currently owned by the Directorate for Property of the Republic of Serbia, with management entrusted to the company A.D. Bukovička Banja. Staro Zdanje is currently closed to visitors, as it has fallen into ruin due to human negligence and is frequently targeted by thieves and vandals. A fire broke out at Staro Zdanje in 2022, damaging the right section of the roof structure, which further drew public attention to the severe state of neglect of the building.

In early 2026, preparations for the reconstruction of Staro Zdanje began, and in March of that year the first phase of reconstruction officially commenced, which is expected to last until the end of the year.

== Gallery ==
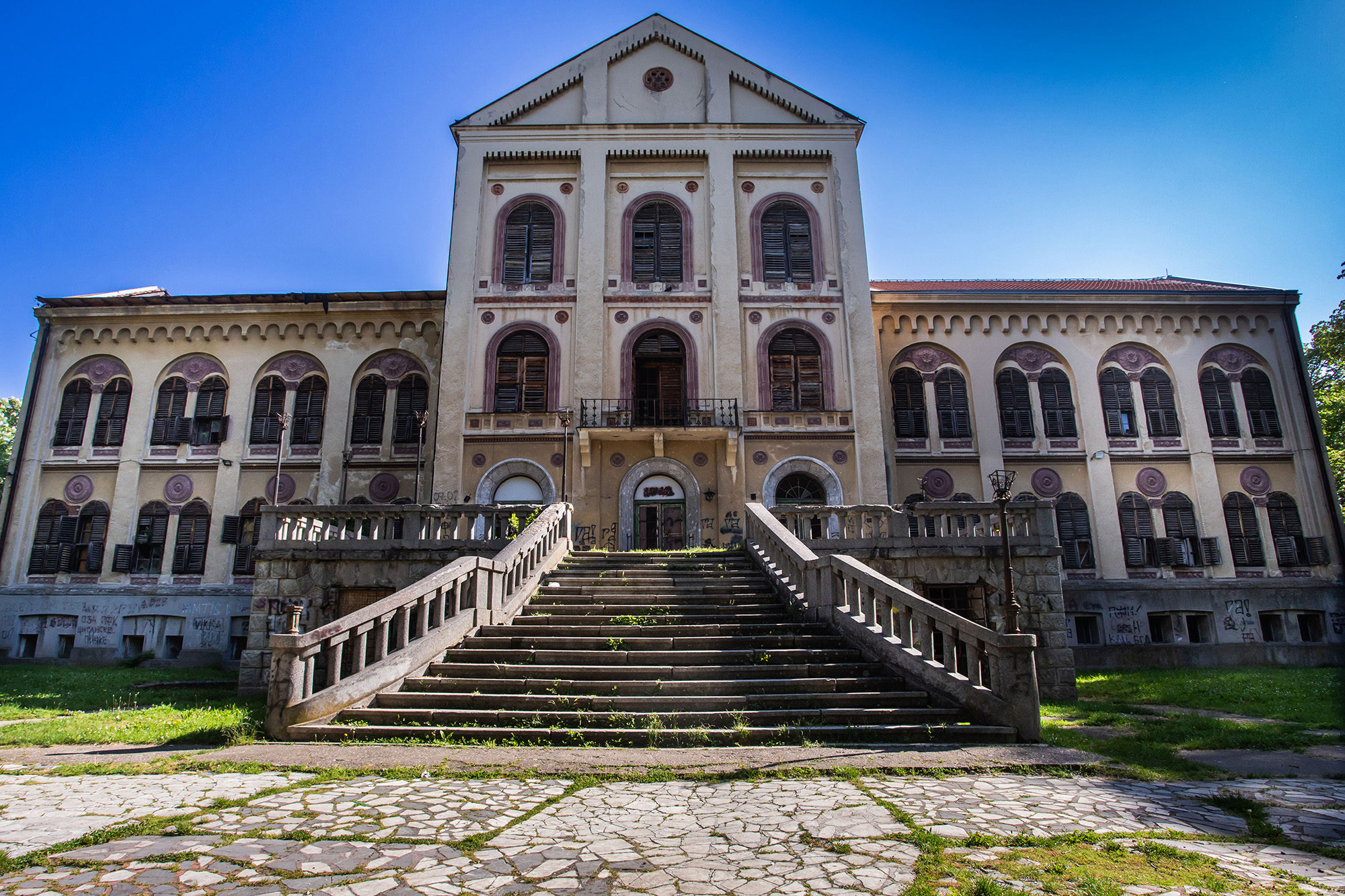

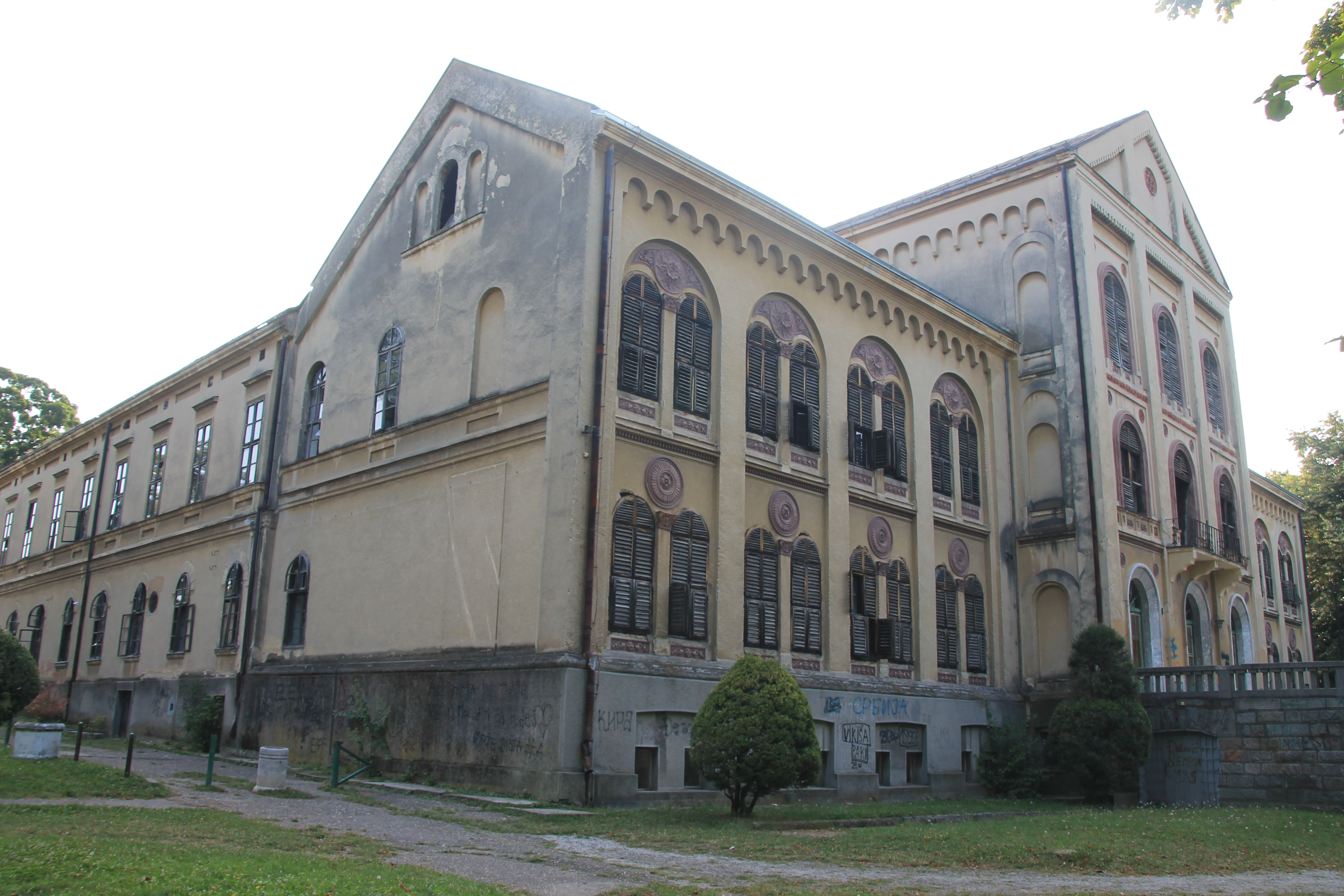

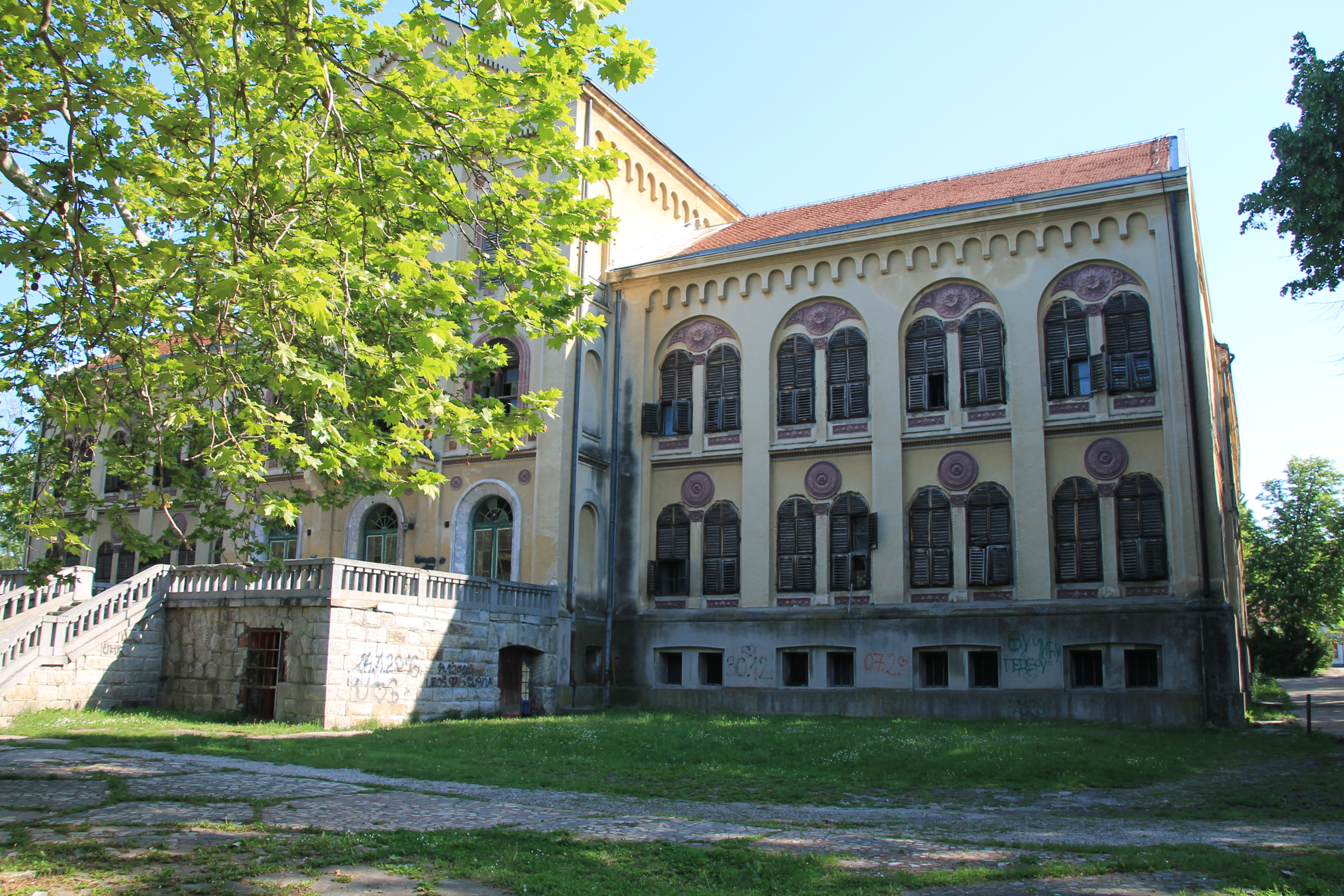

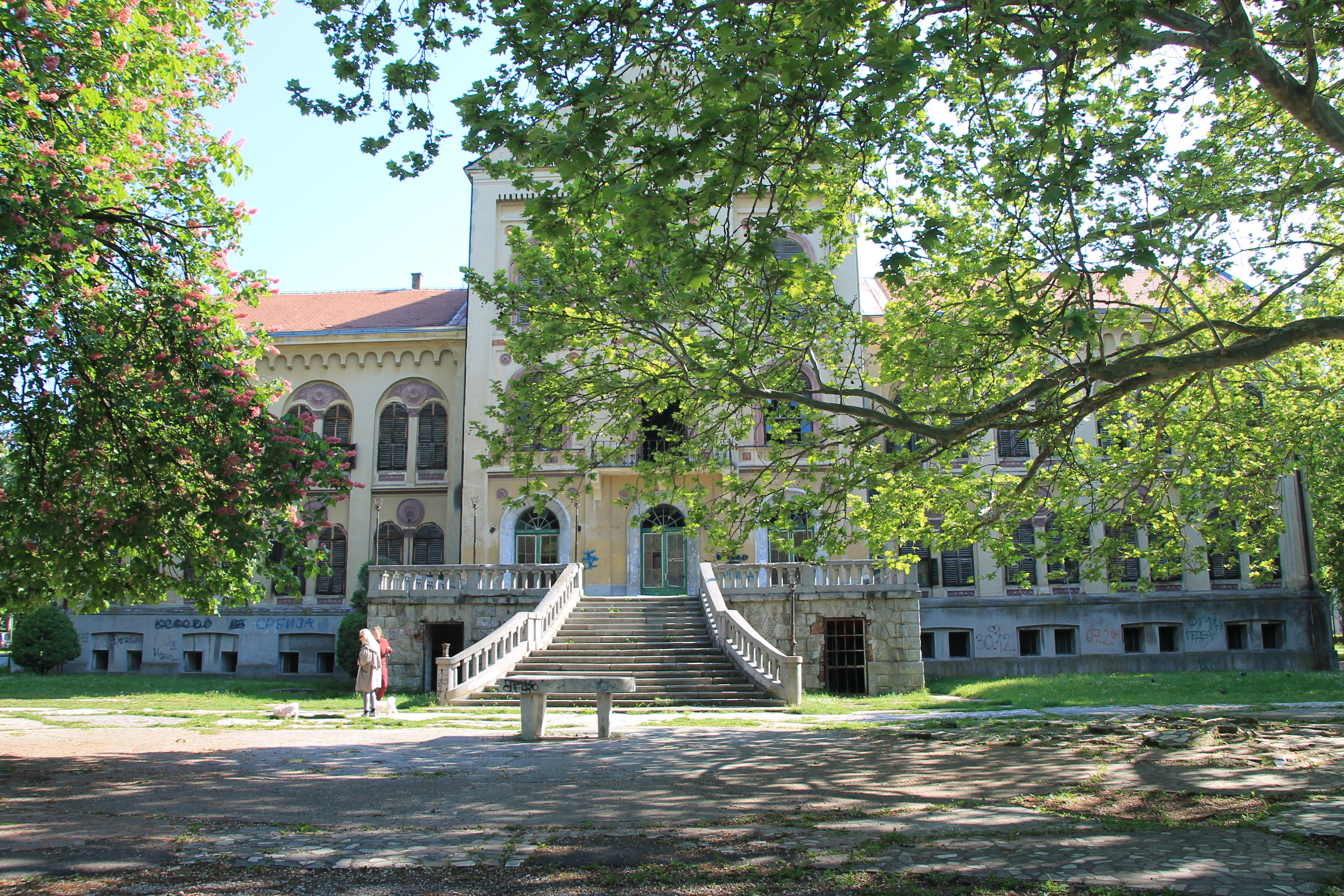

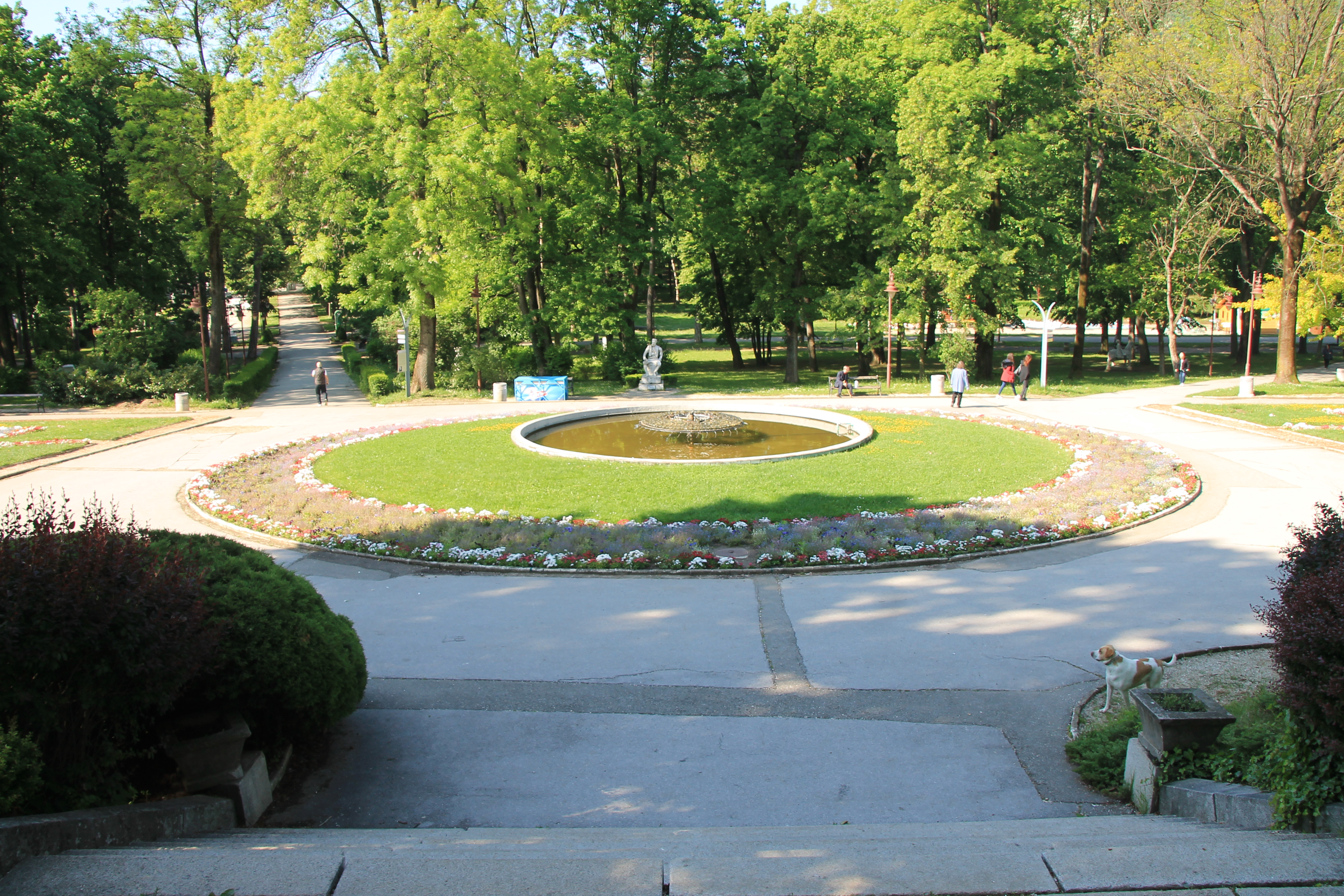
