= Vukosavci =

- Village
- Location within Serbia
- Coordinates: 44°15′N 20°32′E
- Country: Serbia
- District: Šumadija
- Municipality: Aranđelovac

Population (2002)
  - Total: 411
- Time zone: UTC+1 (CET)
  - Summer (DST): UTC+2 (CEST)

Vukosavci (Serbian Cyrillic: Вукосавци) is a village in the municipality of Aranđelovac, Serbia. According to the 2002 census, the village has a population of 411 people.
