= Bukulja =

Mountain in Serbia

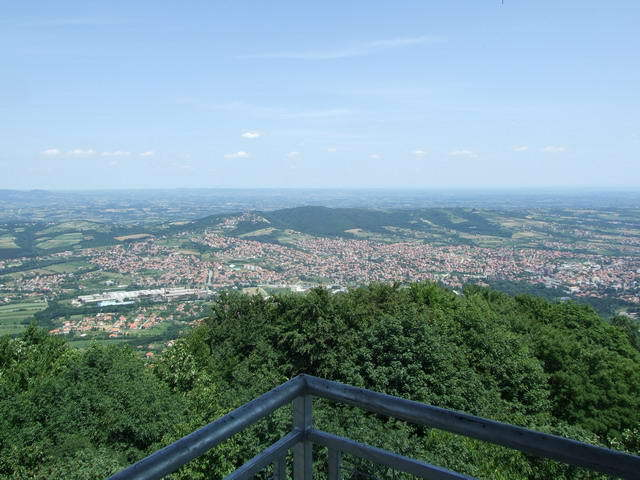
- View of Aranđelovac from Bukulja

Highest point
- Elevation: 696 m (2,283 ft)
- Coordinates: 44°17′55″N 20°31′45″E

Geography
- Location within Serbia
- Location: Central Serbia
- Parent range: Dinaric Alps

Bukulja (Serbian Cyrillic: Букуља, pronounced [bǔkuʎa]) is a mountain central Serbia, above the town of Aranđelovac. This mountain is an extinct volcano, which has been proved by presence of granite rocks, which contains specific mineral composition. In the mountain foothills, there is water catchment Garaši, which provides Aranđelovac and nearby communities with fresh water.

Garaši is also a popular fishing spot for locals and visitors from across Serbia and Europe. The reservoir frequently hosts fishing tournaments, primarily focused on bass. The city’s fishermen’s organization oversees the wildlife in and around the lake, providing food and managing the fish population to keep it healthy and sustainable.

The name "Bukulja" originates from the Serbian word for beech (bukva), as the mountain’s slopes and summit are densely forested with beech trees. The area offers well-maintained paths and a paved road to the summit, where a hunter's hostel is located. This spot attracts many hikers and hunters from Aranđelovac, Belgrade, and other towns and villages across Serbia.

Bukulja is also renowned as the source of Knjaz Miloš mineral water. The source, situated 500 meters (1,600 feet) underground, is located in a protected area, shielded by layers of clay and granite from the Bukulja mountain.

Bukulja also features a 19 meter high observation tower providing views of Šumadija.

== See also ==
- List of mountains in Serbia
