= Church of the Holy Apostles Peter and Paul, Aranđelovac =

Coordinates: 44°18′47″N 20°33′41″E

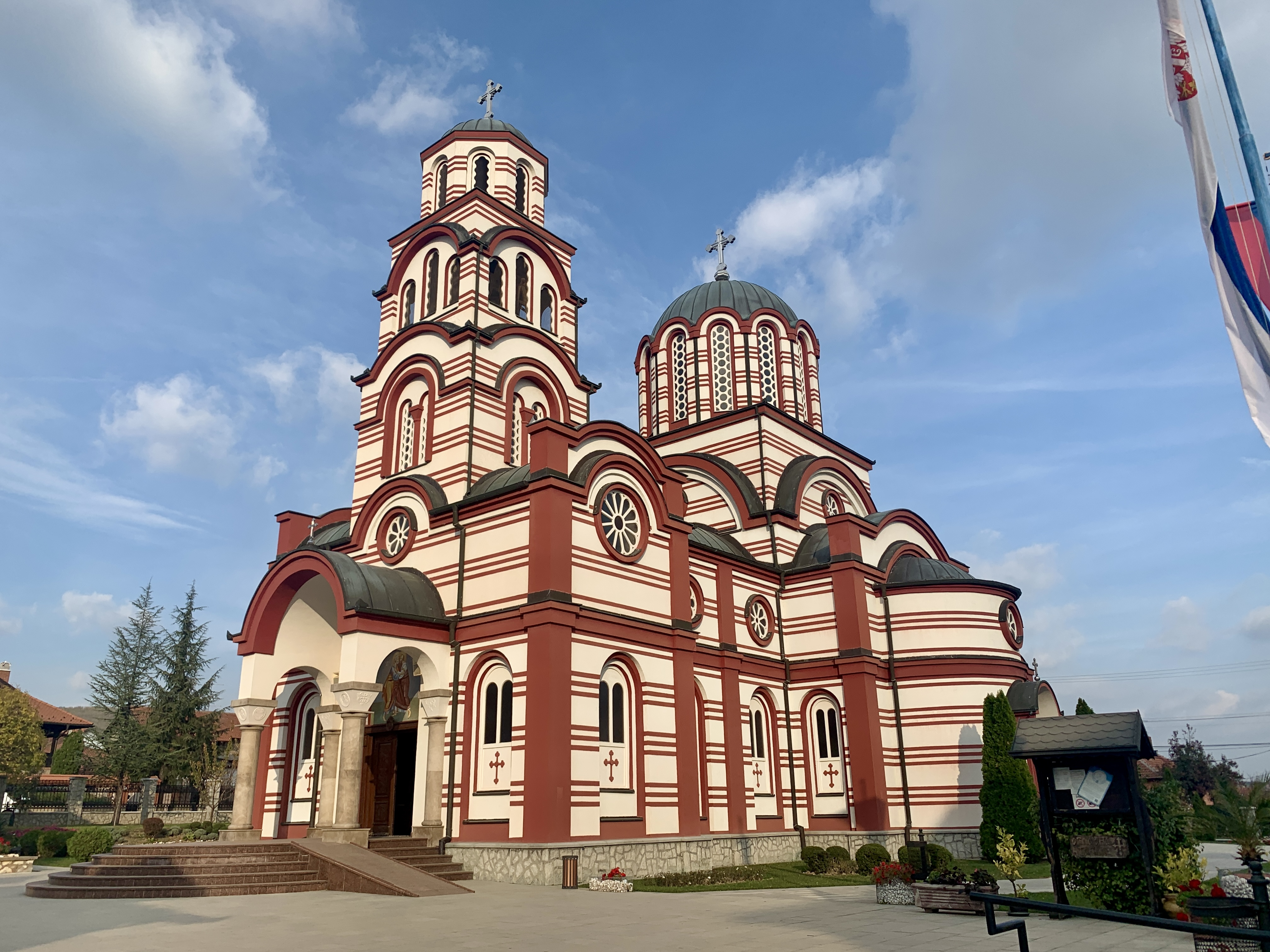
- Church of the Holy Apostles Peter and Paul in Aranđelovac (October 2024).
- Church of the Holy Apostles Peter and Paul, Aranđelovac
- Location: Aranđelovac
- Country: Serbia
- Denomination: Serbian Orthodox

Architecture
- Years built: 2004

Administration
- Diocese: Eparchy of Šumadija

The Church of the Holy Apostles Peter and Paul (Serbian Cyrillic: Црква Светих апостола Петра и Павла; Latin: Crkva Svetih apostola Petra i Pavla) is a Serbian Orthodox church building located in Aranđelovac, central Serbia.

The church is dedicated to the Apostles Peter and Paul. It belongs to the Eparchy of Šumadija.

== History ==
The church was built in 2004.

== Gallery ==
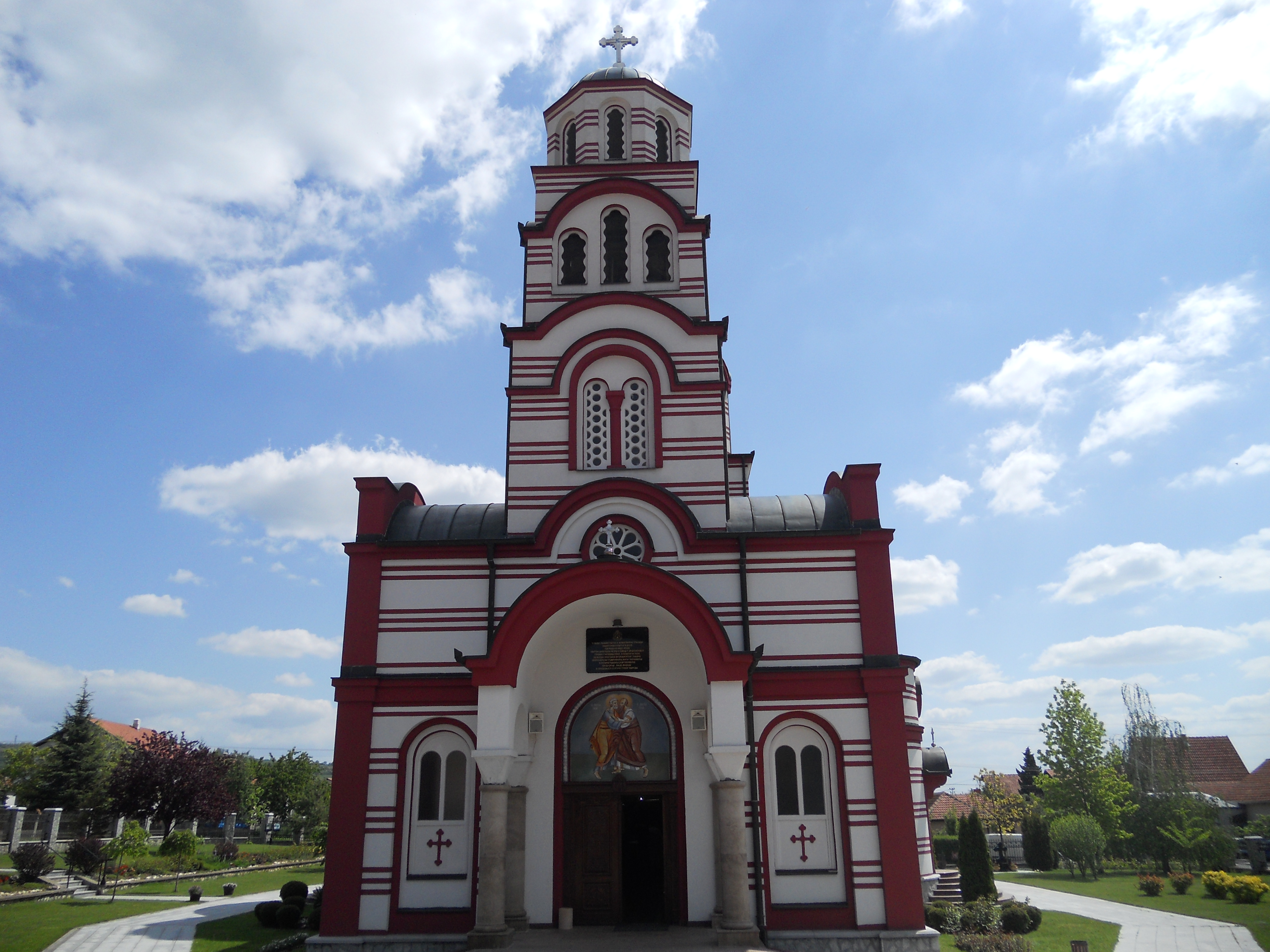
