= Risovača Cave =

Cave and archaeological site in Serbia

- Пећина Рисовача (Serbian)
- Pećina Risovača
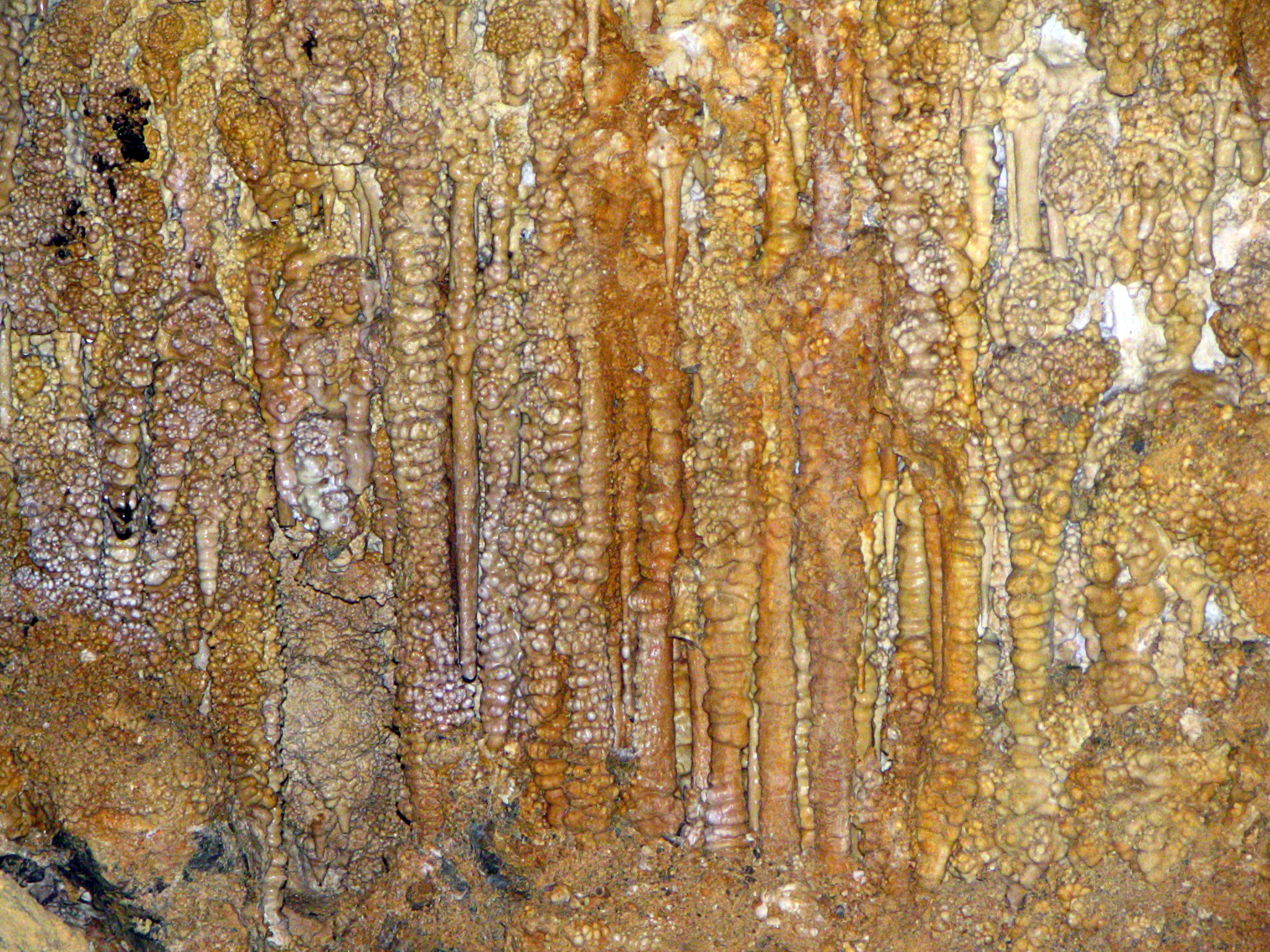
- Minerals on the walls

- Location in Serbia
- 44°18′0″N 20°33′59″E
- Type: Cave
- Periods: Palaeolithic
- Cultures: Mousterian
- Associated with: Homo neanderthalensis
- Location: Near Aranđelovac town
- Region: Central Serbia

Site notes
- Excavation dates: 1953

Risovača Cave, (Serbian Cyrillic: Пећина Рисовача, romanized: Pećina Risovača) is situated at the very entrance of the town of Aranđelovac in central Serbia around 17 m (56 ft) above the Kubršnica river valley. It is one of the most important archaeological sites of the Paleolithic in Serbia besides the Gradac Cave near Kragujevac. Its discovery confirmed the assumed existence of the Paleolithic culture south of the Sava-Danube line and provided new information on the life of prehistoric humans in Europe.

== Geography ==
Formation of the Risovača cave started during the Cretaceous. It was created by the warm, mineral waters, which are abundant in the region surrounding Aranđelovac. The cave contains some natural rarities, like the marble onyx, which deposited from the water on the floor of the cave. It also contains aragonite, which groups its crystals on the ceiling of the cave (branching stalactite forms called flos-ferri ("flowers of iron"), seemingly defying the gravity.

== Discovery ==
The site has been discovered around 1938 when the quarry on the location became operational, but the size and importance were not recognized until 1950 when the old quarry was reopened. Unfortunately, at the same time the incorrigible damage was done to the site even before the scientific excavations began as the entry section of 20 m (66 ft) collapsed, destroying the richest cultural layer. By the 2020s, the cave and its surroundings became part of Aranđelovac's urban zone.

== Exploration ==
Archaeological and speleological excavations started in 1953, headed by the archaeologist Branko Gavela and young speleologist Radenko Lazarević (1924-2022). Fossils of 20 different mammals were discovered in the cave, that include cave hyena, wolf, fox, wild horse, cave bear, mammoth, woolly rhinoceros, cave lion, leopard, wild boar, badger, mole rat, beaver, hare and steppe bison. The cave depth is approximately 187 m (614 ft) and its caverns, or "halls" are covered with minerals of various shapes and colors. Worked flint tools and bone artifacts of prehistoric human origin were discovered in sediments in a depth of 1 to 1.75 m (3.3 to 5.7 ft). These artifact assemblages are attributed to Neanderthal occupants during the end of the Middle Paleolithic period. Neanderthal fossil remains have so far not been found during excavations because any layers that might have held remains were already destroyed and removed during earlier stone quarrying.

== Risovača man ==
It is estimated that Neanderthals populated the cave in the period of 35,000 to 50,000 years and is one of, so far five caves in the Balkans, where the Neanderthals lived. Gavela immediately estimated, based on the remains of the material culture, that the inhabitants were contemporaneous with the Krapina man. The inhabitants were estimated to be of short but sturdy stature, hunched a bit and capable of making tools from stones and animal bones: daggers, stone bradawls and stone-layered knife. Some of those tools, they used to fight with the animals which roamed the steppes around the cave in the finals stage of an ice age.

== Protection ==
Risovača Cave has been declared a national archaeological site of great importance in 1983 and put under legal protection by the Republic of Serbia. The cave remains a refuge for several endangered and protected species of bats.

The protected area covers the surrounding 13 ha (32 acres), and is inhabited by 180 species of plants, 200 species of insects, 20 species of mammals, with additional amphibians and reptiles.

== Tourism ==
The cave was open for tourists in 1987. A sculptural complex, representing a Neanderthal family around the fireplace is exhibited in the cave. With 24,000 visitors in 2016 it was the third most visited cave in Serbia. By 2023 the number of visitors reached 40,000.

Project for the Visitation Center in front of the cave entrance was finished in October 2023. There will be exhibited archaeological artefactss and over 6,000 animal remains from the last ice age.

== See also ==
- Archaeological Sites of Great Importance (Serbia)
- List of caves in Serbia
- List of longest Dinaric caves
- Tourism in Serbia
