= Aranđelovac =

Aranđelovac Аранђеловац (Serbian)
- Town and municipality
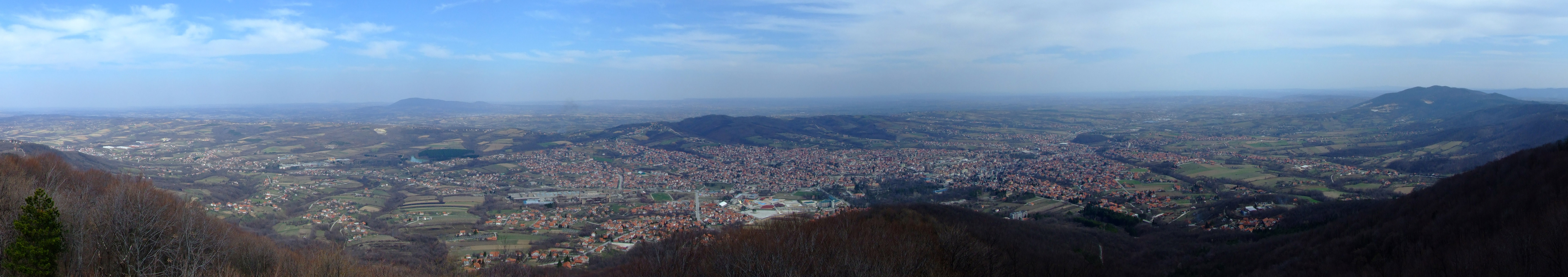
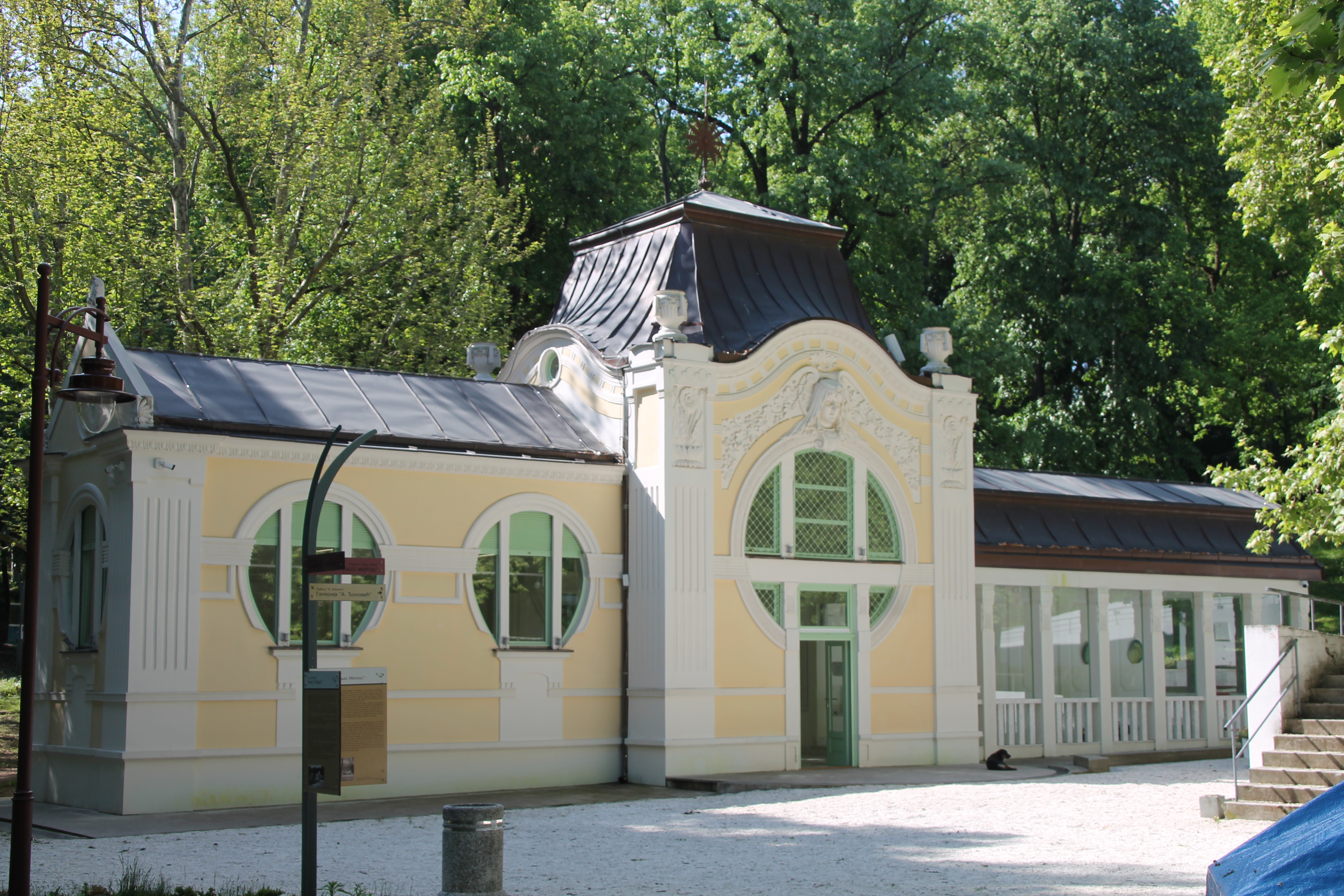
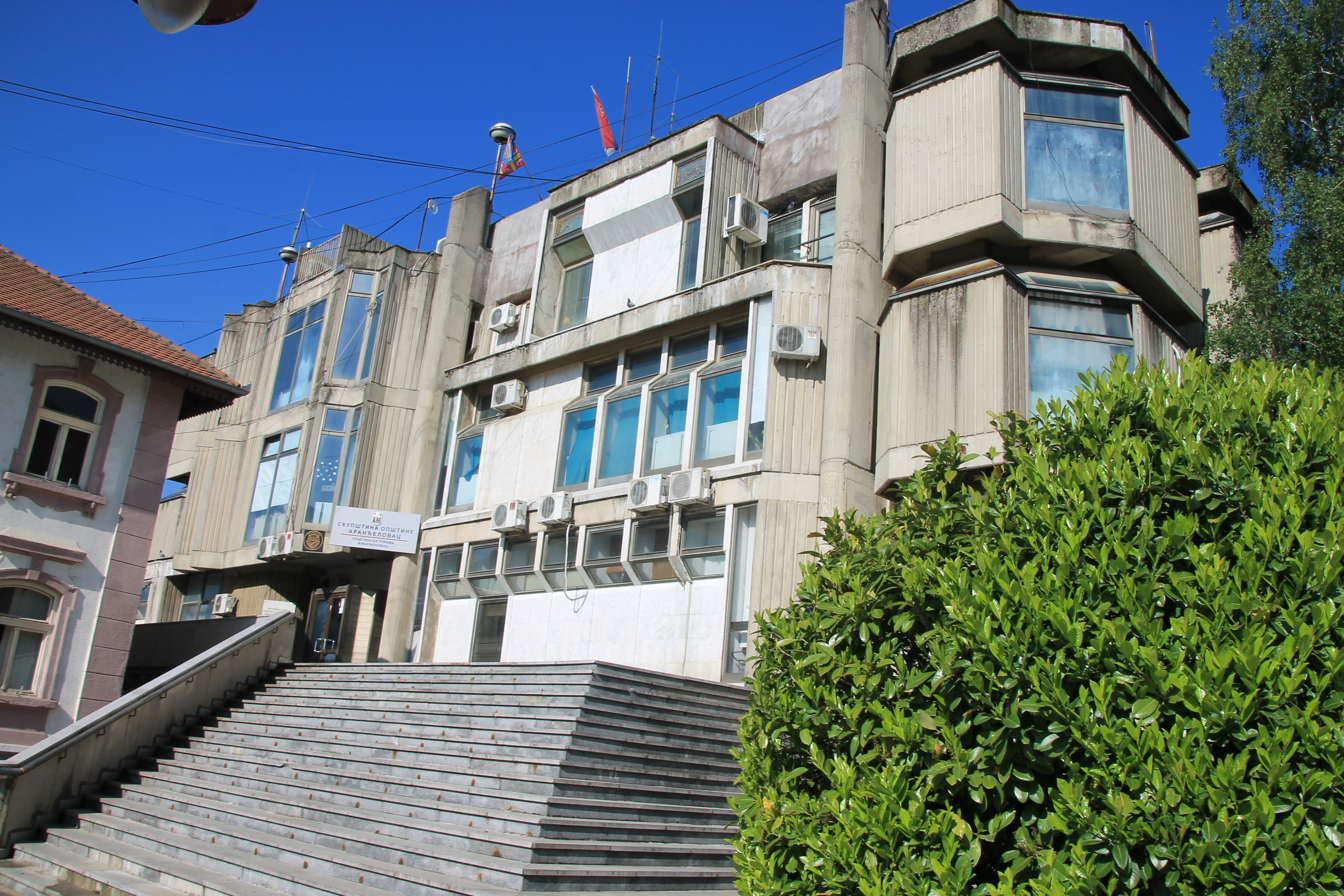
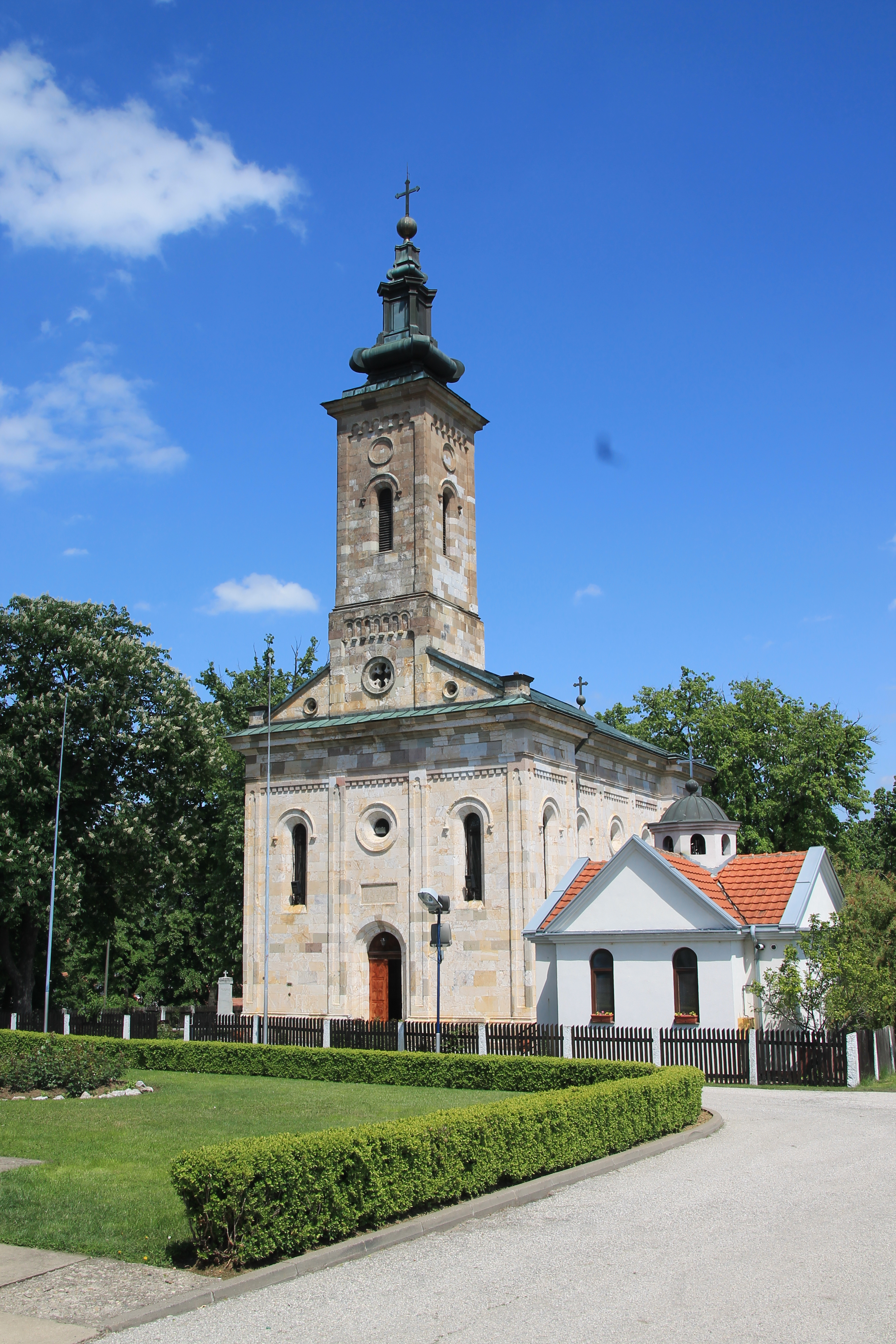
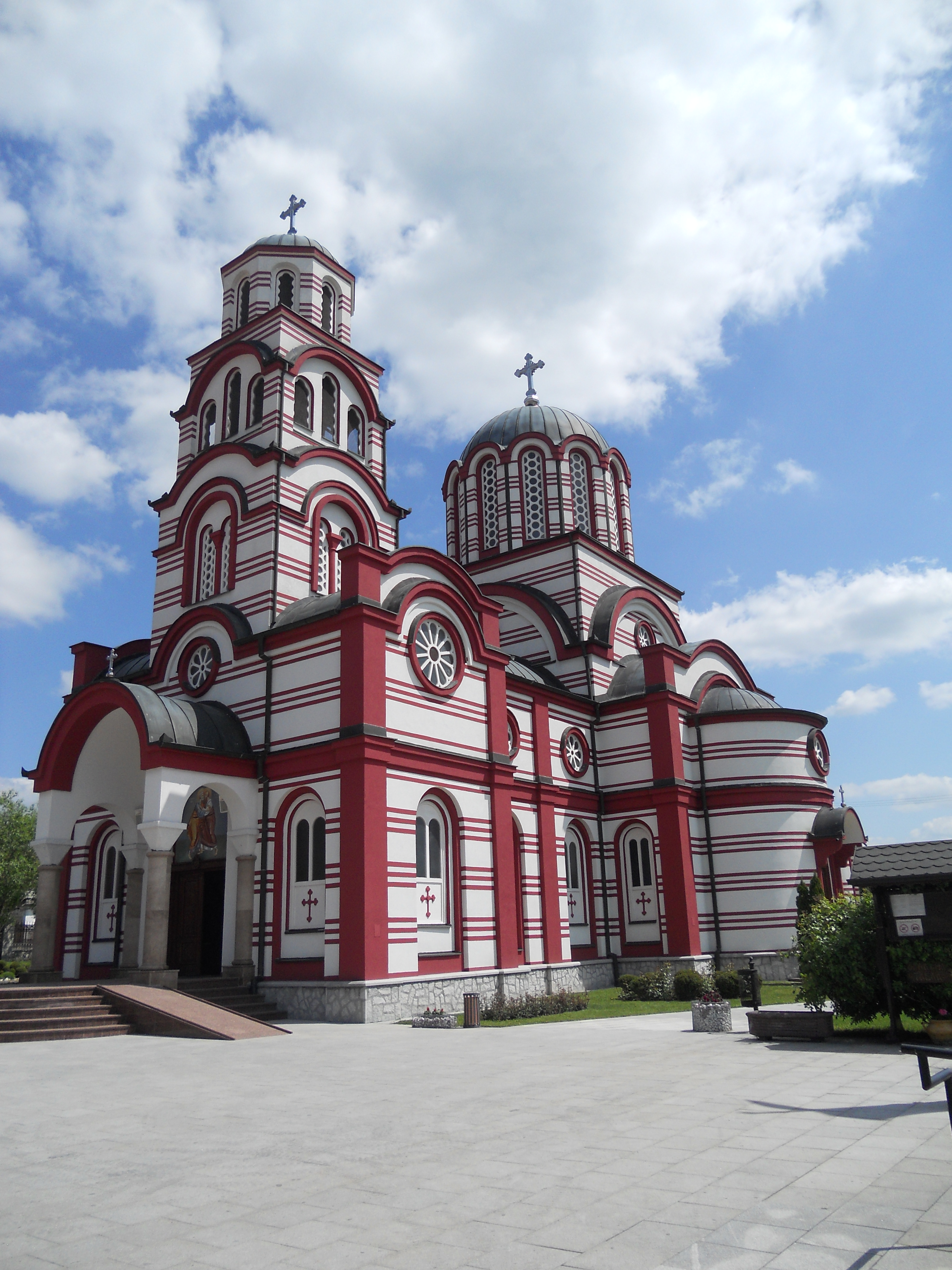
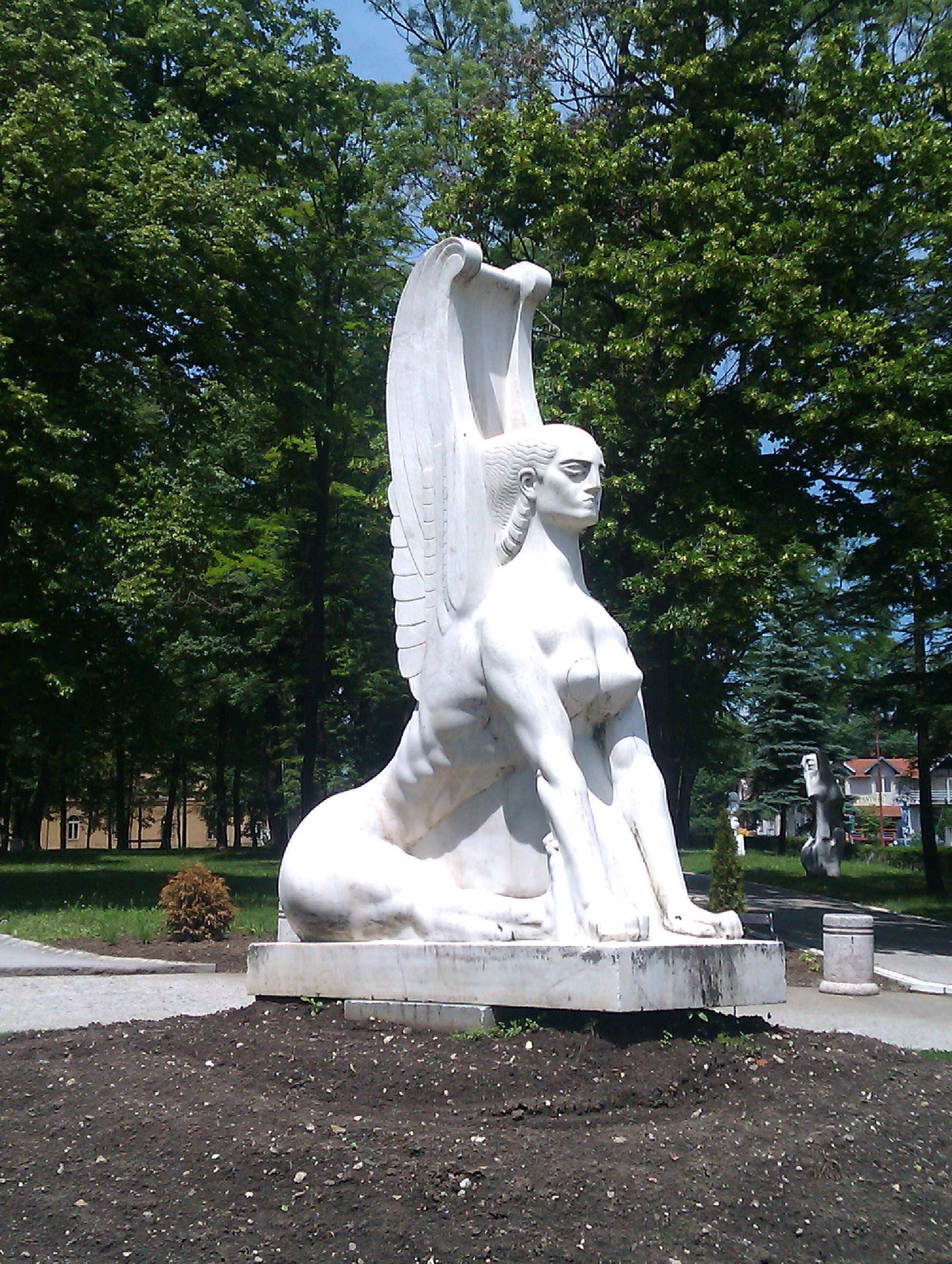
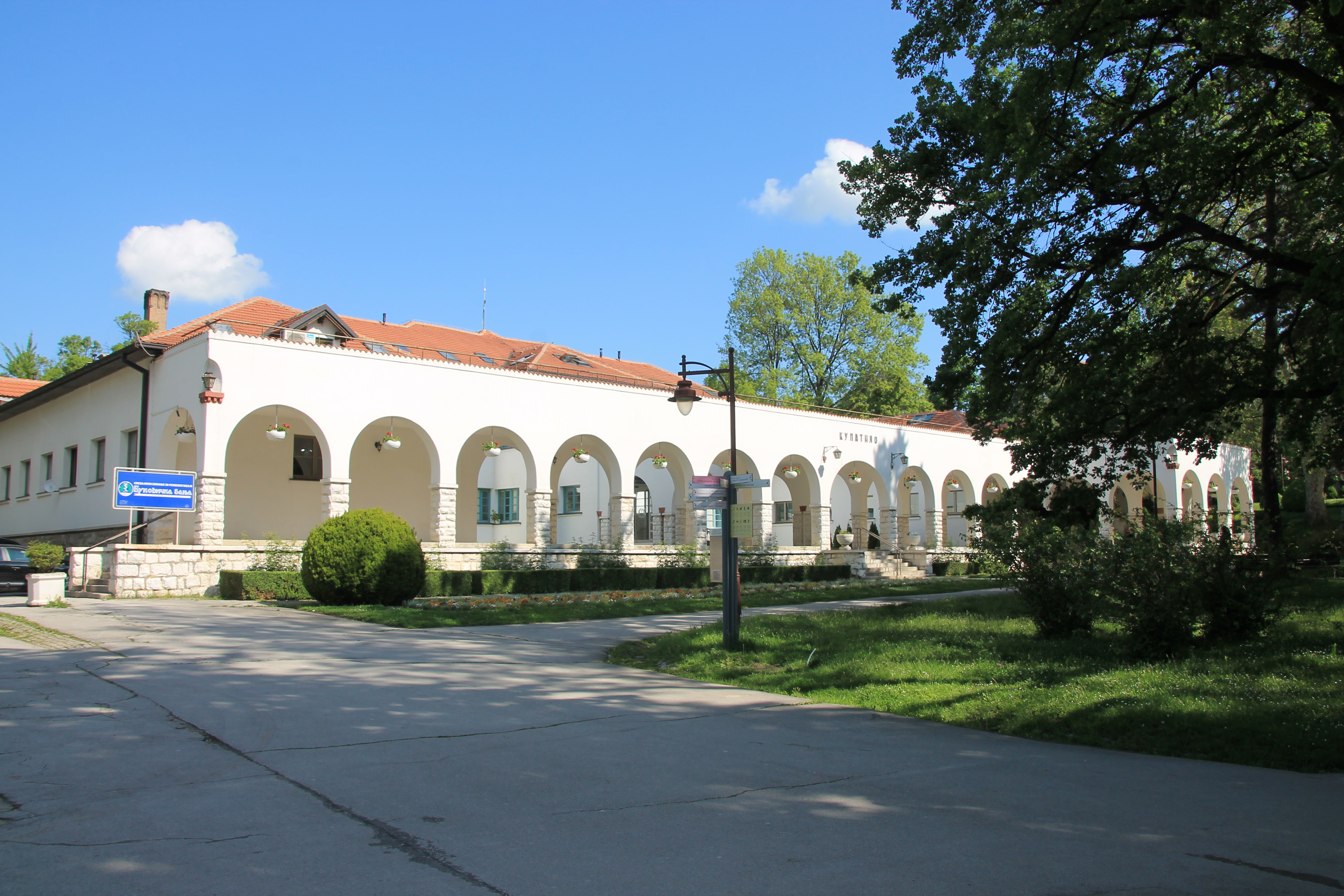
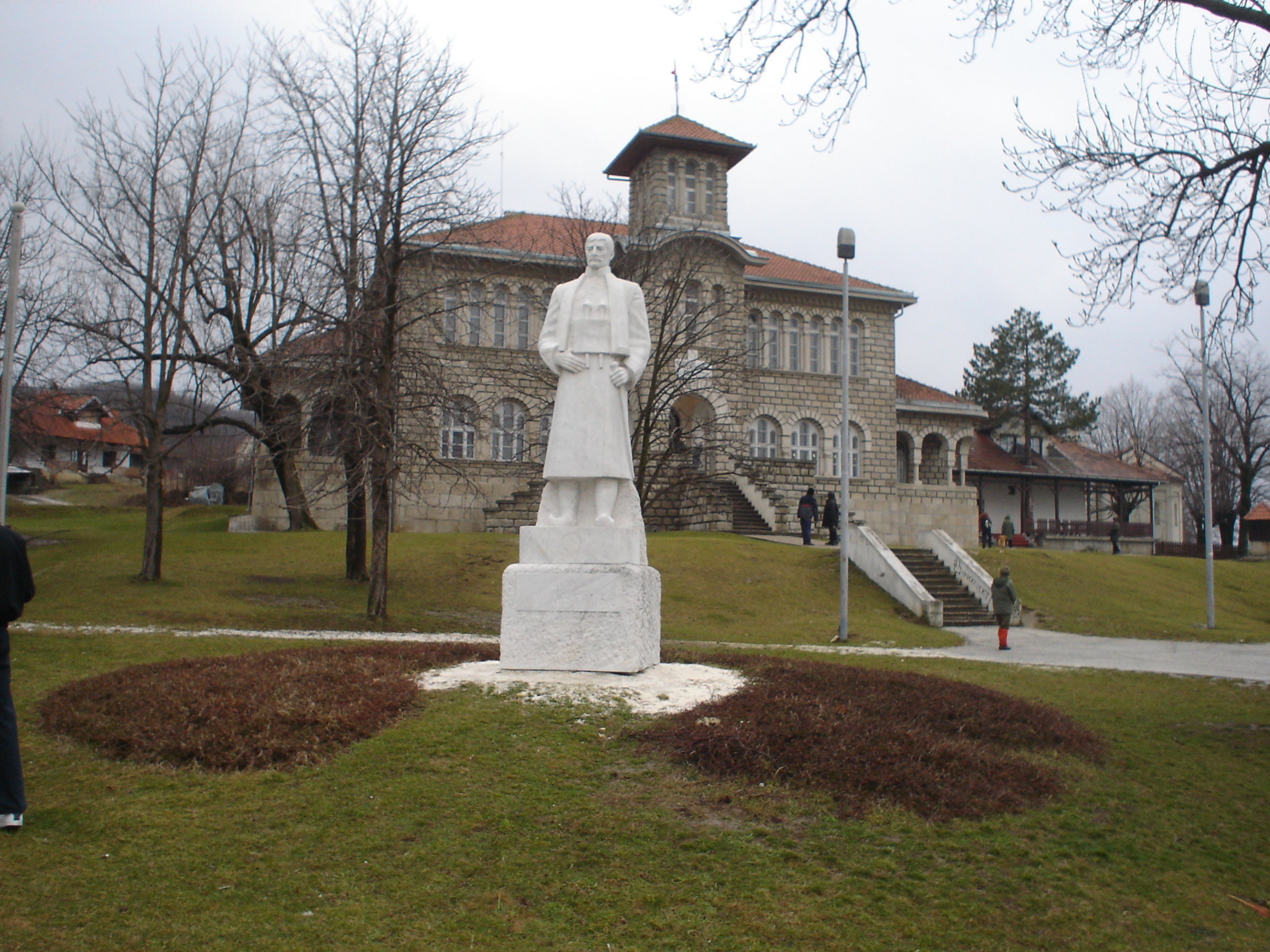
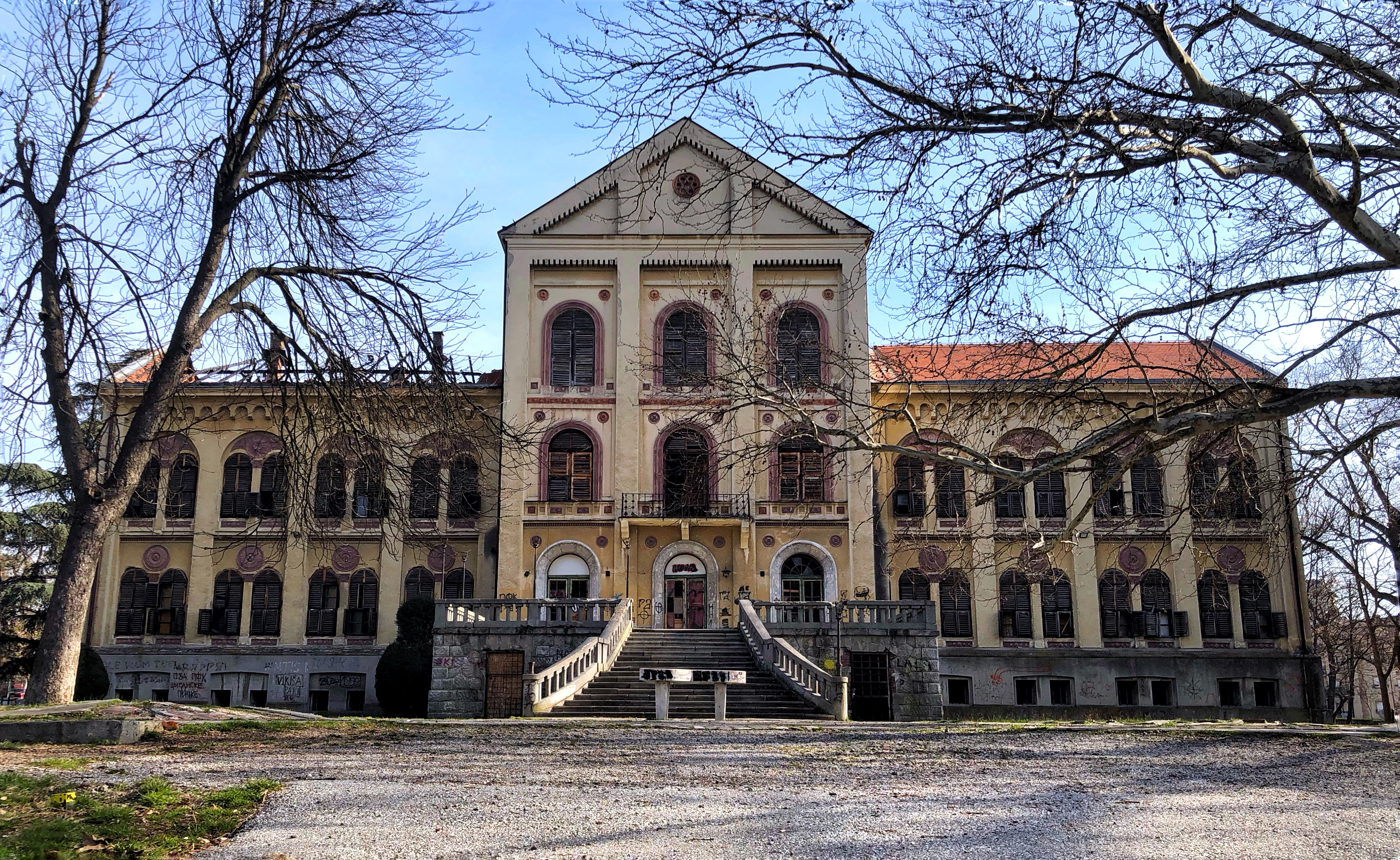
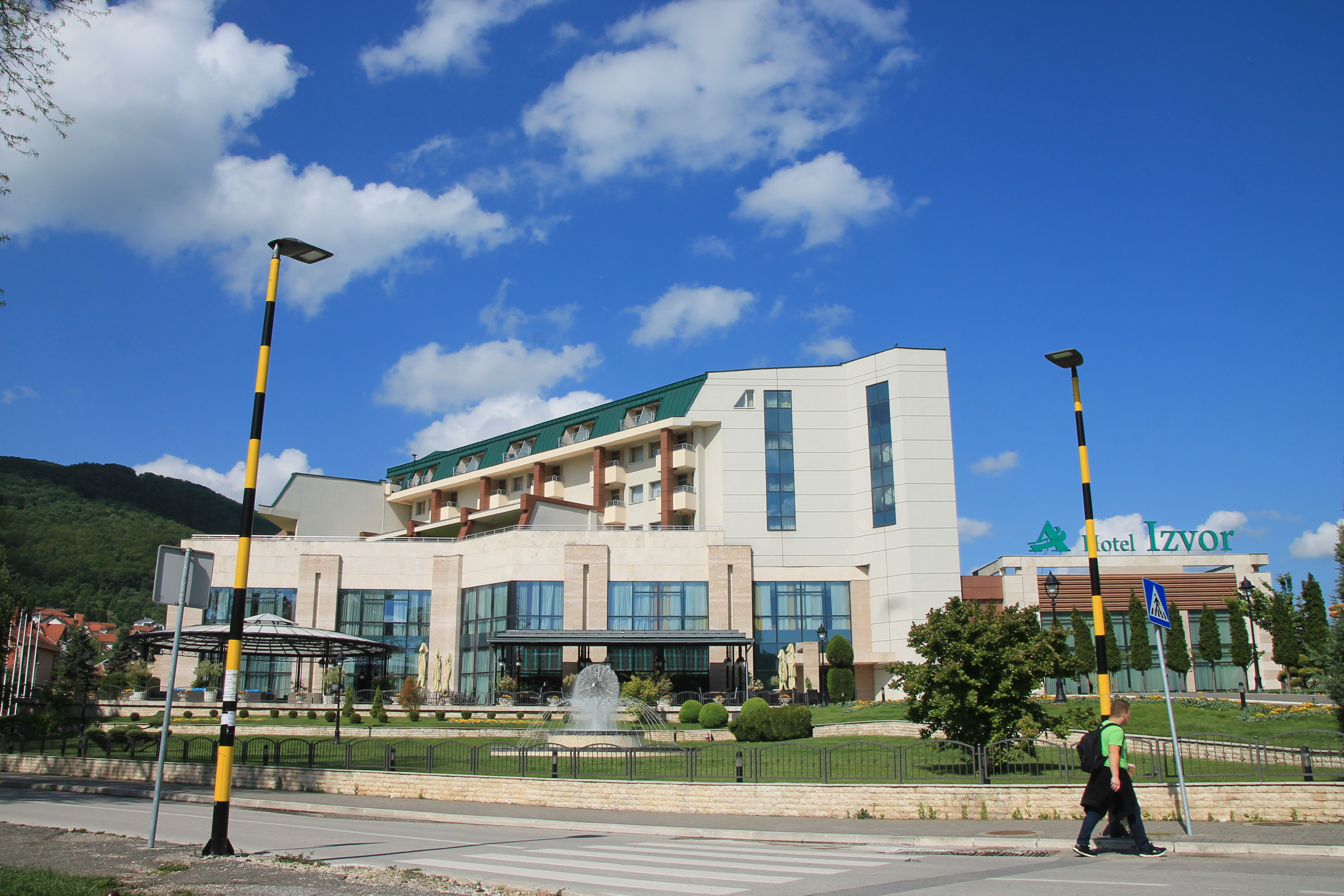
- Panorama of Aranđelovac Knjaz Miloš Pavilion Aranđelovac Town Hall Church of St. Archangel Gabriel Church of the Holy Apostles Peter and Paul Sphinx Monument in Bukovačka Banja Park Bukovačka Banja Karađorđe Monument in Orašac near Aranđelovac Prince Mihailo's Summer Palace Hotel Izvor

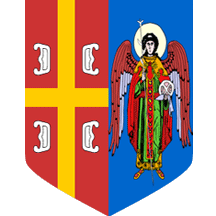
- Coat of arms

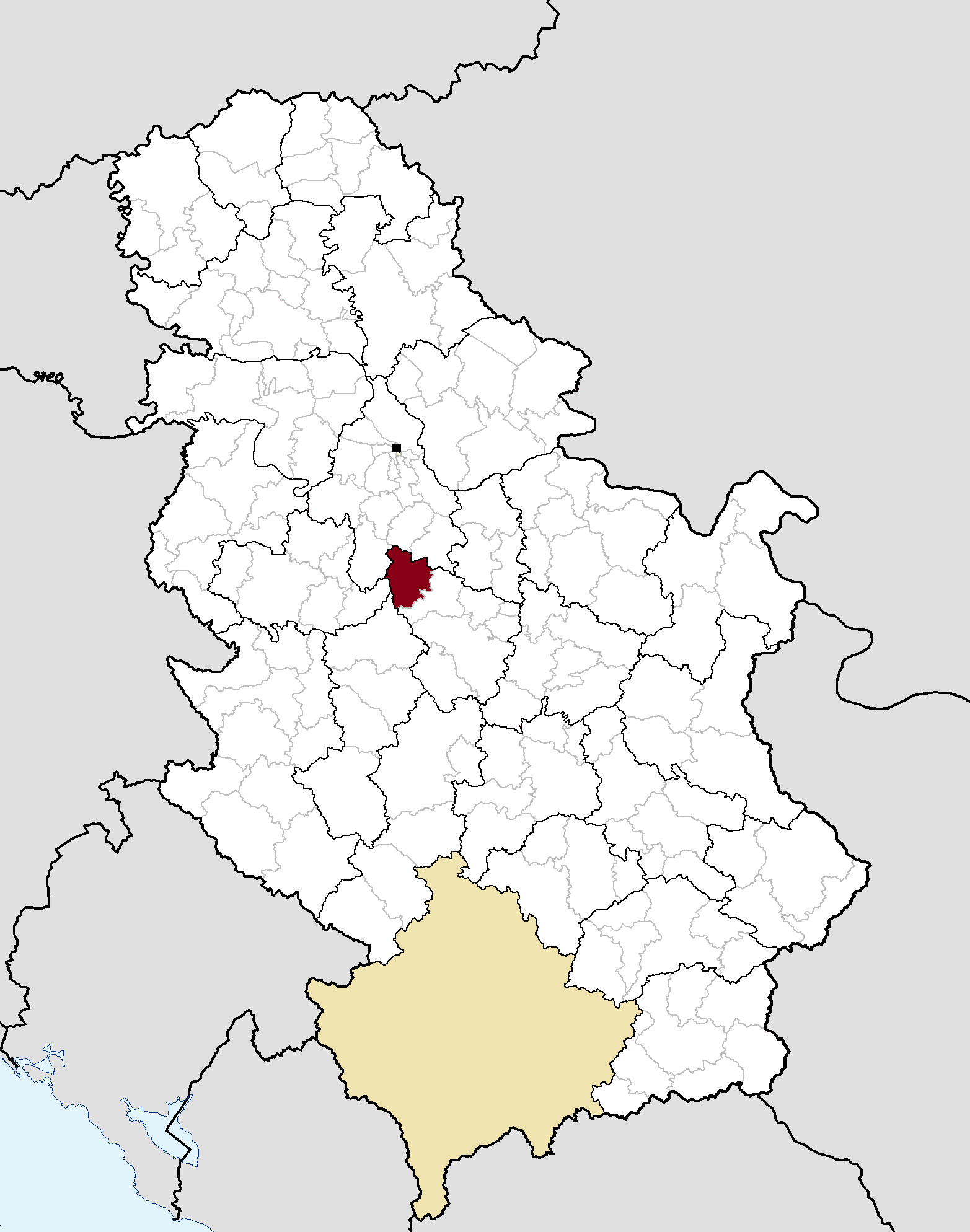
- Location of the municipality of Aranđelovac within Serbia
- Coordinates: 44°18′N 20°34′E
- Country: Serbia
- Region: Šumadija and Western Serbia
- District: Šumadija
- Settlements: 19

Government
  - Mayor: Goran Orlić (SNS)

Area
  - Town: 8.43 km^{2} (3.25 sq mi)
  - Municipality: 375.69 km^{2} (145.05 sq mi)
- Elevation: 257 m (843 ft)

Population (2022 census)
  - Town: 22,881
  - Town density: 2,710/km^{2} (7,030/sq mi)
  - Municipality: 41,297
  - Municipality density: 109.92/km^{2} (284.70/sq mi)
- Time zone: UTC+1 (CET)
  - Summer (DST): UTC+2 (CEST)
- Postal code: 34300
- Area code: +381(0)34
- Car plates: AR
- Website: www.arandjelovac.rs

Aranđelovac (Serbian Cyrillic: Аранђеловац, pronounced [ǎraːndʑeloʋats]) is a town and a municipality located in the Šumadija District of central Serbia. As of 2022, the municipality has a population of 41,297 inhabitants, while the town has 22,881 inhabitants.

It is situated beneath the mountains Bukulja and Venčac, at about 255 metres (837 ft) above sea level, 75 kilometres (47 miles) away from Belgrade. The municipality encompasses two towns and 18 village communities. Also, Bukovička Banja spa is located in the town.

== Etymology ==
Most of the town territory used to belong to the village of Vrbica, today its suburb. Since prince Miloš Obrenović often resided in the Bukovička Banja, he decided to build a church in Vrbica in 1858 (one of his "repentance churches"), and dedicated it to St. Archangel Gabriel.

By the prince's decree, the growing community surrounding the church was proclaimed the town of Aranđelovac ("The town of Archangel (Angel)") in 1859, occupying major parts of territories of villages Vrbica and Bukovik. By the same decree, the prince ordered establishment of the spa of Bukovička Banja.

== History ==
=== Prehistory ===
Though the town itself is a 19th-century settlement, the area has been inhabited for a long time. The Paleolithic site of Risovača Cave is located at the entrance of the town. On the eastern slope of the Venčac mountain there is a locality of Dizljak, which belongs to the Neolithic Vinča culture.

=== Roman period ===
The remains from the Roman period were discovered on the Mali Venčac peak. They included ceramics, glass cups and dishes, jugs, jewelry (earrings, ornamental pearls, fibulas), cloths (belts, buckles) and coins. As the area is made of limestone, artifacts corroded significantly, except for the glass remains which are exceptionally preserved. The jewelry is made of copper and silver.

In the summer of 2017, further Roman remains were unearthed on the Great Venčac, the highest peak of the mountain, some 500 m (1,600 ft) away from the Little Venčac. The remains included graves, bones, glass and ceramics. The necropolis is dated between the 4th and the 6th century and by August 2018, 23 graves were discovered, including one of a child. Four skeletons were placed in the east-west direction and the others in the northwest-southeast one. The graves are spreading in the direction of the highest peak itself, but there are no sufficient funding to explore the top of the mountain itself.

It was previously believed that this was a military outpost, but with the new discoveries, it is now believed that this was a fully developed and systematically built settlement. In the late 20th century, the probing of the terrain indicated that the dwelling units are located below the ground. The anthropological survey of the bones is planned in order to confirm that the civilians also lived in the settlement. One of the problems is the local quarry as archaeologists believe that the decades-old digging on the mountain destroyed most of the remains.

=== Middle Ages ===
In the 2010s, the remains of a monumental 14th-century church in the Dvorine locality were discovered.

== Climate ==
Aranđelovac has a humid subtropical climate (Köppen climate classification: Cfa) that is very close to an oceanic climate (Köppen climate classification: Cfb).

Climate data for Aranđelovac
Month	Jan	Feb	Mar	Apr	May	Jun	Jul	Aug	Sep	Oct	Nov	Dec	Year
Mean daily maximum °C (°F)	6.0 (42.8)	7.8 (46.0)	13.5 (56.3)	17.4 (63.3)	23.2 (73.8)	25.6 (78.1)	28.1 (82.6)	27.6 (81.7)	23.9 (75.0)	18.1 (64.6)	11.3 (52.3)	7.2 (45.0)	17.5 (63.5)
Daily mean °C (°F)	1.8 (35.2)	2.9 (37.2)	7.5 (45.5)	11.8 (53.2)	16.2 (61.2)	19.4 (66.9)	21.7 (71.1)	21.4 (70.5)	17.7 (63.9)	13.1 (55.6)	7.5 (45.5)	3.3 (37.9)	12.0 (53.6)
Mean daily minimum °C (°F)	−0.9 (30.4)	−0.3 (31.5)	1.6 (34.9)	7.5 (45.5)	12.7 (54.9)	16.5 (61.7)	18.6 (65.5)	18.2 (64.8)	13.9 (57.0)	8.1 (46.6)	4.8 (40.6)	1.3 (34.3)	8.5 (47.3)
Average precipitation mm (inches)	51 (2.0)	47 (1.9)	49 (1.9)	58 (2.3)	81 (3.2)	88 (3.5)	76 (3.0)	54 (2.1)	54 (2.1)	48 (1.9)	61 (2.4)	66 (2.6)	733 (28.9)
Source: Climate-Data.org

== Settlements ==
Aside from the town of Aranđelovac, the municipality comprises the following settlements:

- Banja
- Bosuta
- Brezovac
- Bukovik
- Bukovička Banja
- Venčane
- Vrbica
- Vukosavci
- Garaši
- Gornja Trešnjevica
- Darosava
- Jelovik
- Kopljare
- Misača
- Orašac
- Progoreoci
- Ranilović
- Stojnik
- Tulež

== Demographics ==
Historical population
Year	Pop.	±% p.a.
1948	32,584	—
1953	35,338	+1.64%
1961	38,562	+1.10%
1971	42,122	+0.89%
1981	46,803	+1.06%
1991	47,618	+0.17%
2002	48,129	+0.10%
2011	46,225	−0.45%
2022	41,297	−1.02%

According to the 2022 census results, the municipality of Aranđelovac had a population of 41,297 inhabitants.

=== Ethnic groups ===
The ethnic composition of the municipality:

Ethnic group	Population	%
Serbs	38,478	93.17%
Romani	335	0.81%
Montenegrins	64	0.15%
Russians	63	0.15%
Yugoslavs	51	0.12%
Macedonians	40	0.1%
Hungarians	22	0.05%
Bulgarians	9	0.02%
Romanians	8	0.02%
Muslims	7	0.02%
Albanians	5	0.01%
Croats	5	0.01%
Others	2210	5.35%
Total	41,297	

== Economy ==
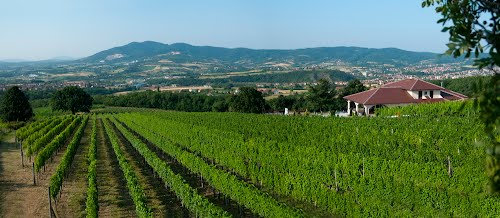
Vineyards outside Arandjelovac

Being a spa resort, tourism and hospitality industry is one of the main economy activity in the town. Arandjelovac has number of hotels, including Staro zdanje, Šumadija, and Izvor, as well as many smaller boutique hotels, and guest houses. In addition the streets of town are littered with many cafés, bars, restaurants and shops. Rural and eco-tourism is also common in the villages around the town.

The most known company hailing from Aranđelovac is Knjaz Miloš, which produces the well-known mineral water, as well as juices, pop, and energy drinks. The naturally carbonised mineral water is extracted from the wells over 100 metres (330 feet) deep, lying under the white marble of the Vencac mountain. Marble is exploited by Venčac company. This quality material from Venčac is used to build many statues displayed in the town sprawling central park built by number of international sculptors. Company Šamot produces high temperature materials from the local deposits of aluminosilicates, while Elektroporcelan produces electrical and thermal insulation ceramics. Company Peštan specializes in PVC products. Kubršnica is the well known brick and building material factory.

The following table gives a preview of total number of registered people employed in legal entities per their core activity (as of 2018):

Activity	Total
Agriculture, forestry and fishing	34
Mining and quarrying	99
Manufacturing	4,175
Electricity, gas, steam and air conditioning supply	83
Water supply; sewerage, waste management and remediation activities	270
Construction	381
Wholesale and retail trade, repair of motor vehicles and motorcycles	2,137
Transportation and storage	470
Accommodation and food services	378
Information and communication	103
Financial and insurance activities	139
Real estate activities	30
Professional, scientific and technical activities	333
Administrative and support service activities	159
Public administration and defense; compulsory social security	323
Education	846
Human health and social work activities	756
Arts, entertainment and recreation	149
Other service activities	190
Individual agricultural workers	361
Total	11,415

== Tourism ==
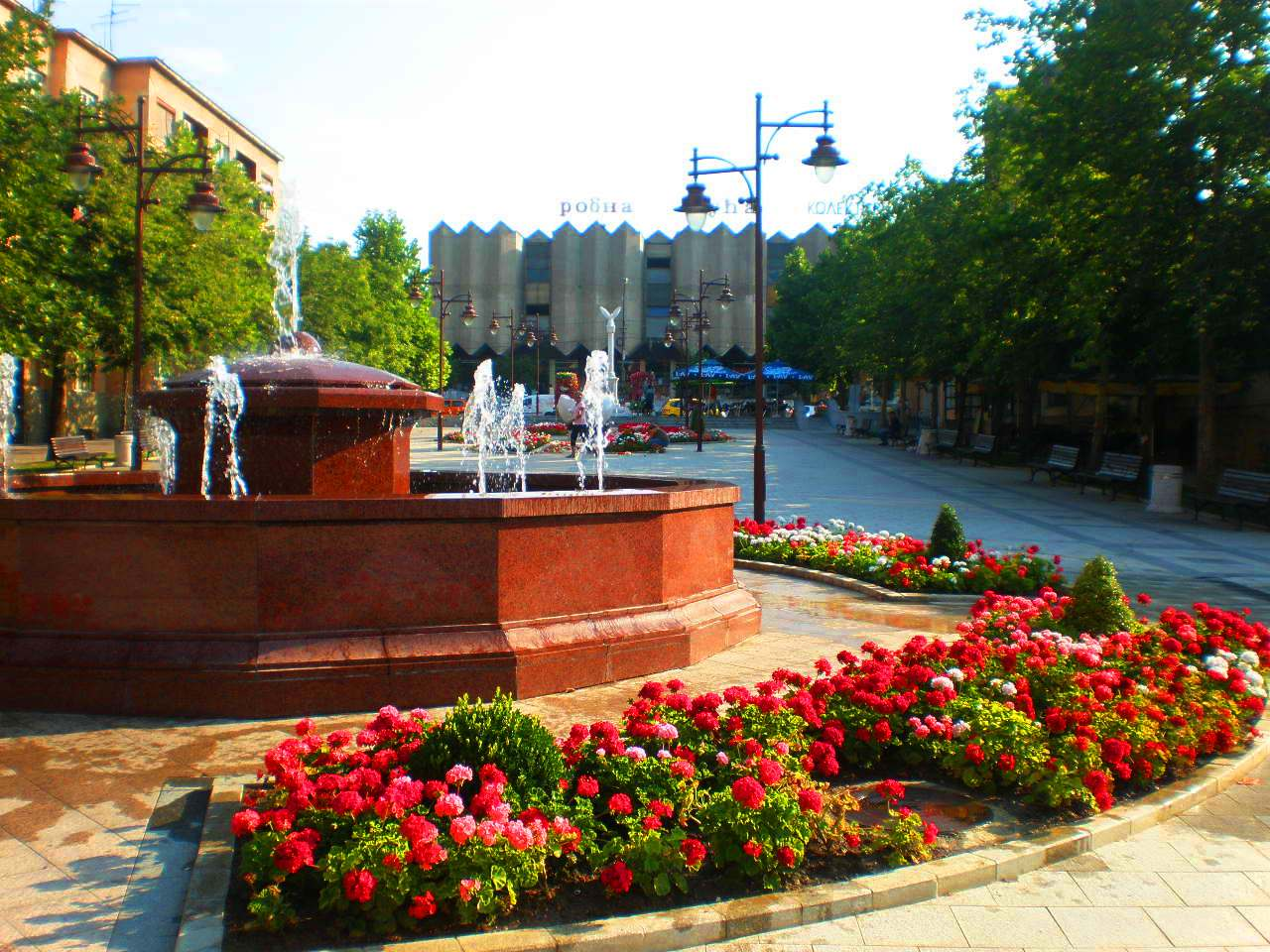
The Main Square in Aranđelovac

=== Bukovička Banja ===
Aranđelovac is well known for the springs of remedial sparkling mineral water. Dositej Obradović, author, educator and a leader of the Serbian Enlightenment movement, brought the springs to the public spotlight by frequenting the spa in the late 18th and early 19th century. In 1809 he wrote that "he sleeps good when he drinks the Bukovik mineral water". Folklorist Vuk Stefanović Karadžić mentioned two sources of "sour (or acid) water" (which is a Serbian name for carbonated mineral water) in Serbia: "one sour at Asan-paša Palanka" and one "sour again, in Bukovik".

By personal request of prince Miloš Obrenović, the water from Bukovik mineral springs was transported and used at his court, so the villagers began to transport the water to Belgrade by the bullock carts. The caravan travelled nine hours to Kragujevac and thirteen hours to Belgrade. After the railroad was constructed through Belgrade in 1884, the water was shipped to Budapest, Vienna, London, etc. Hand-bottling of the mineral water for commercial use began at the beginning of the 20th century, and through the decades to come to receive the highest international honors for quality, including the fairs in Brussels (1906) and London (1907), when it was declared the mineral water of highest quality. A promotional photo of guys and girls in a boat on the lake of mineral water became famous throughout Europe.

=== Pavilion of Prince Miloš ===
In 1907 the Pavilion of Prince Miloš was built atop one of the oldest discovered springs. The pavilion was projected by architect Branko Tanazević and was one of the first buildings in Serbia made with reinforced concrete. It was built in the Vienna Secession style and consisted of three sections. The mineral water spring was in the central part, bottling facility was in the northern wing, while there was a pastry shop in the southern wing. The southern wing was originally a veranda with a colonnade. Later, it was walled in order to enlarge the indoors of the building, and to mimic the opposing, northern wing.

In the mid-1960s, the pavilion was adapted into an art gallery. After the pavilion was damaged during the 2014 Southeast Europe floods it was renovated from September 2015 to June 2016. The aim of the project was not just the reconstruction and moist and water protection, but the restoration of the original appearance of the edifice. As no original plans survived, the object was re-measured and the old postcards were used. During the reconstruction of the floor, the original staircase with the ceramic tiles was discovered. It leads to the original bottling location, as all the springs used to be 1.5 to 2 m (4 ft 11 in to 6 ft 7 in) below the surface. Today they are all on the ground level. The old staircase, not being included in the project as no one knew about it, was covered again. The southern wing was restored to the original veranda look, but it was glassed with transparent glass. The mineral water is still available in the central part, only now it is conducted from all neighboring springs. Southern wing still hosts the gallery and a small museum of Bukovička Banja. The reconstruction project was awarded the 2018 Europa Nostra Award, European Union prize for cultural heritage.

=== Park ===
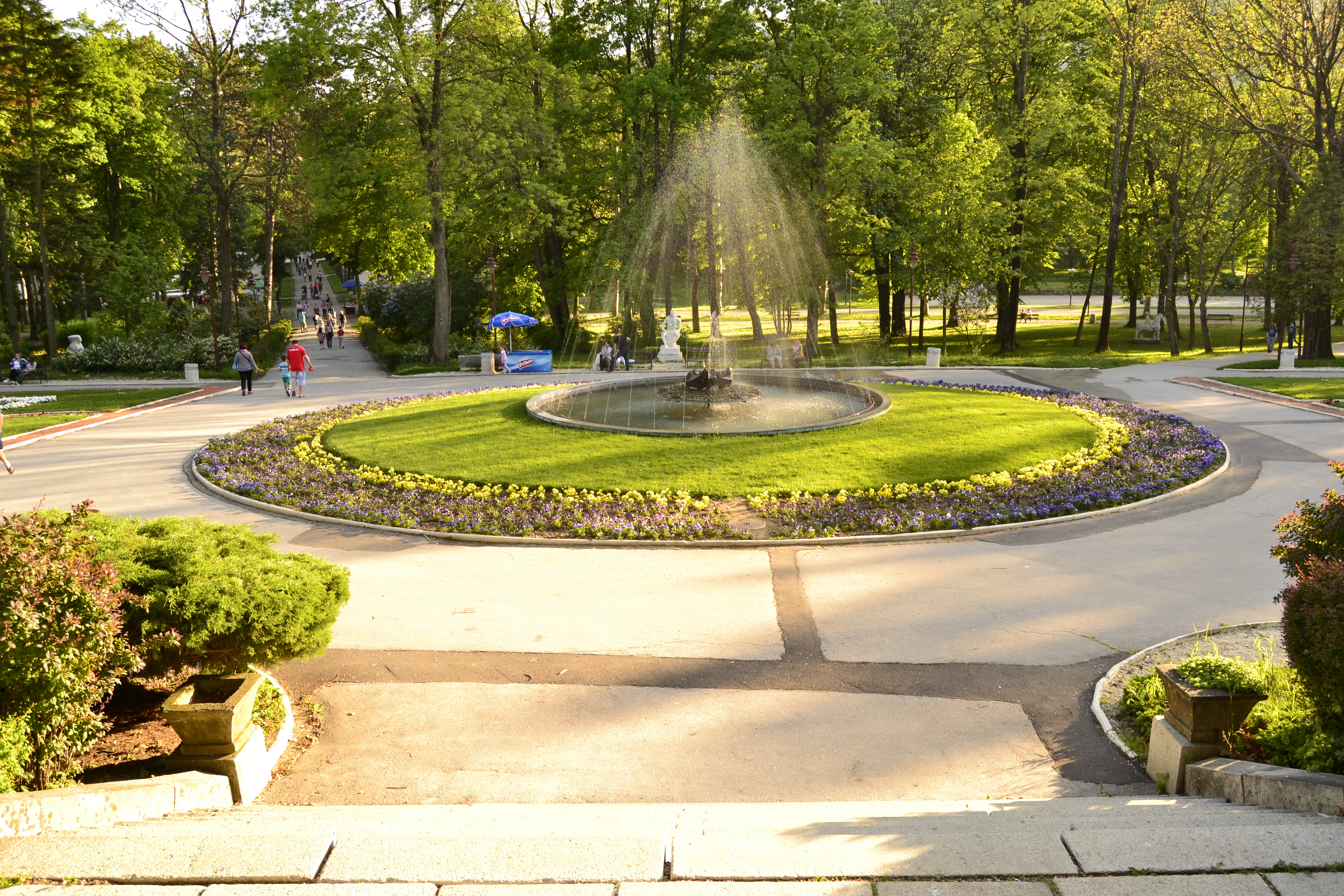
The park of Bukovička Banja in Aranđelovac

The park of Bukovička Banja shares the popularity with Aranđelovac mineral water. It encompasses the area of 21.5 ha with the permanent exhibition of marble figures of the most eminent domestic (ex-Yugoslavian) and foreign authors, a product of the 30-year tradition of the festival Mermer i zvuci. All the events take place in the summer open scene in the park, or in the Sala Kneževa, in the Staro Zdanje hotel. This 150-year-old hotel is situated in the park itself, and its original purpose was the summer residence for the Obrenović dynasty. The Pavilion of Prince Miloš and several mineral water springs are also situated in the park. The mineral water is used in the Spa together with clay from the local area in curing diseases of the gastrointestinal system, the liver and the biliary system, respiratory diseases, and locomotor organs. The flag-bearer of the tourism in the town, the luxurious hotel and spa resort Izvor is located adjacent to the park. In addition to accommodation for its guests, the hotel offers congress, spa and wellness services.

=== Other ===
The Aranđelovac municipality area also bears historical importance. First Serbian Uprising against the Turks in 1804 started in the village of Orašac (6 km (3.73 mi) from the town). A complex in Marićevića Jaruga in Orašac memorizes the location where the rebellion started. February 15, the day of uprising, is celebrated as the day the modern Serbian state is founded.

10 km (6.21 mi) away from Aranđelovac is the accumulation Lake Garaši, Aranđelovac’s supply of water. The lake encompasses 65 hectares (160 acres), its deepest point is at 22 metres (72 feet), it is rich in fish and it is the town’s anglers' favourite fishing location. Aranđelovac Museum has a permanent exhibition of various items from the Neolith Risovačka Cave, which is located at the very entrance of the town.

== Sports ==
Local football club FK Šumadija has competed in the Yugoslav Second League. The town has styled itself as "The City of Handball" and have a successful women's team ŽRK Aranđelovac as well as a men's team ORK Šamot 65.

== Gallery ==
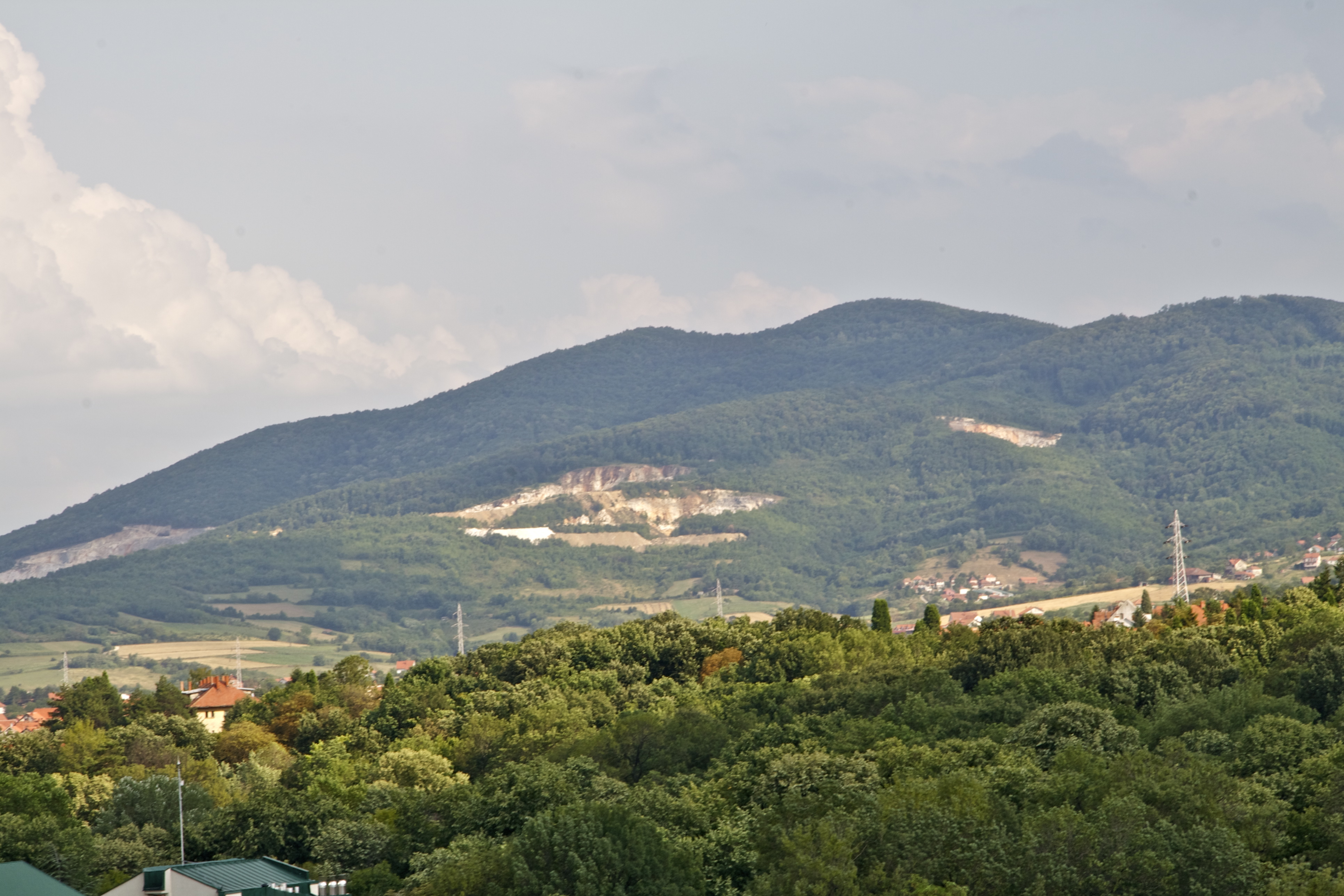
Mountain Venčac

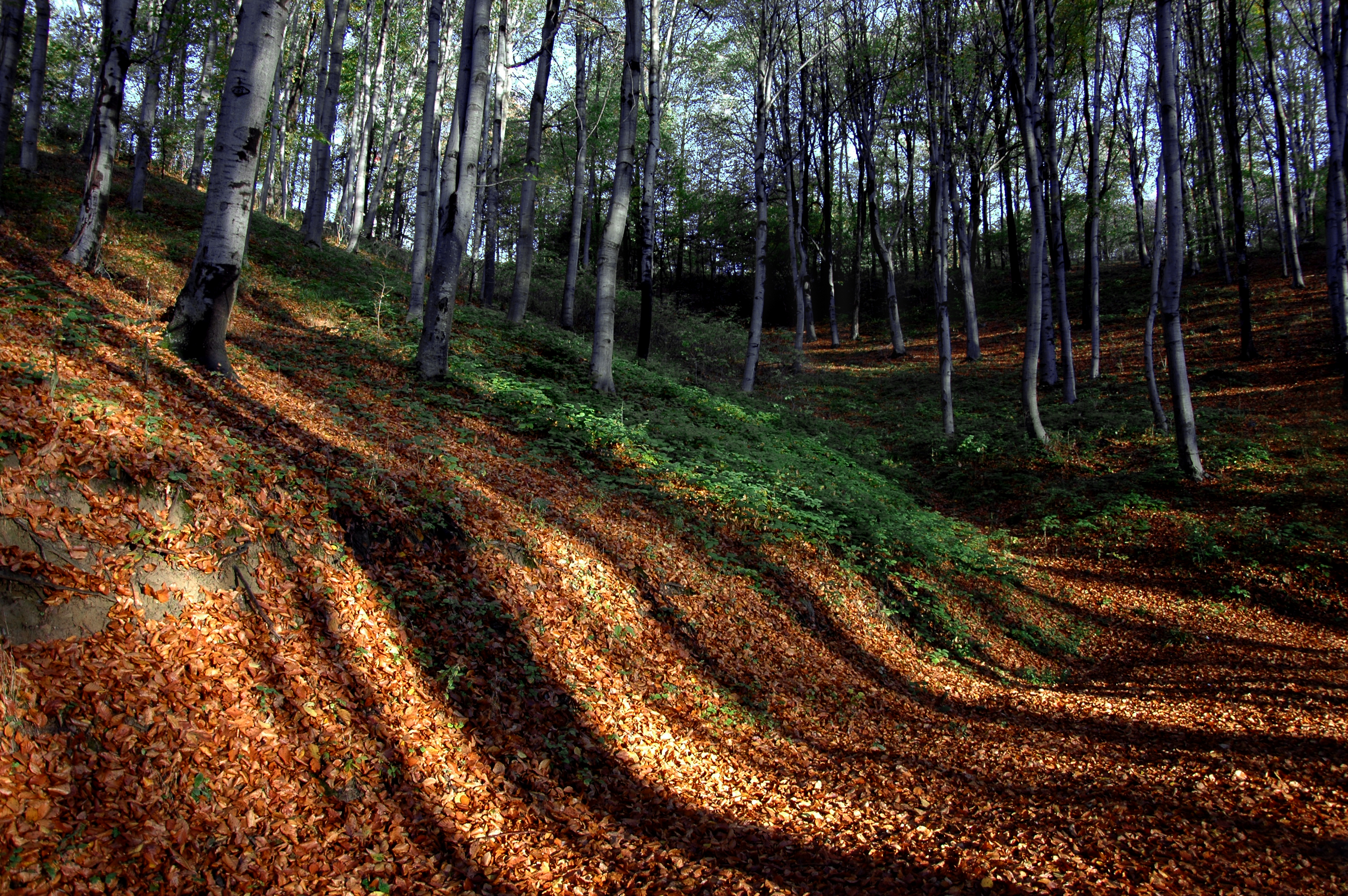
Mountain Bukulja Forrest

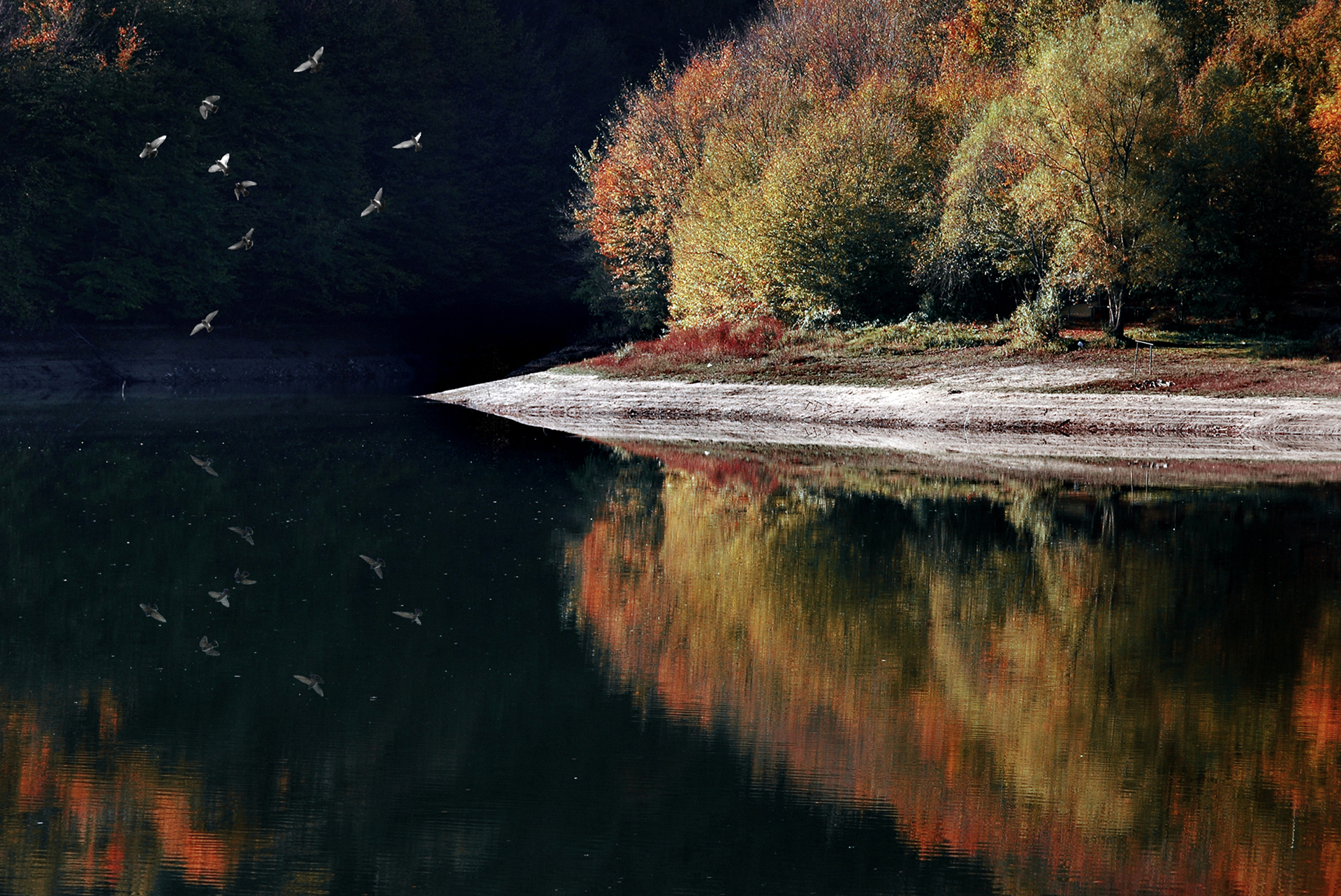
Lake Garaši

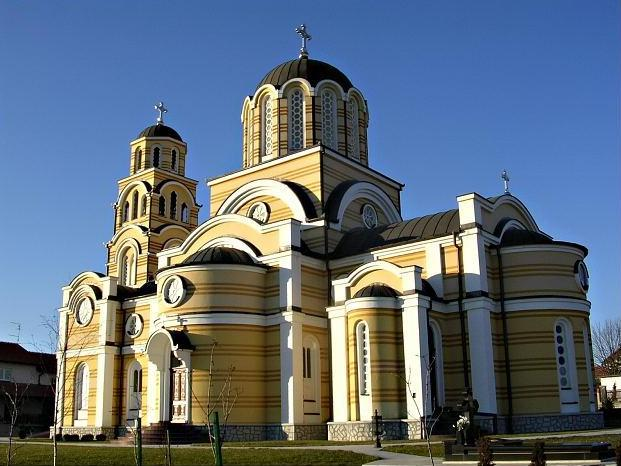
Church of the Holy Apostles Peter and Paul.

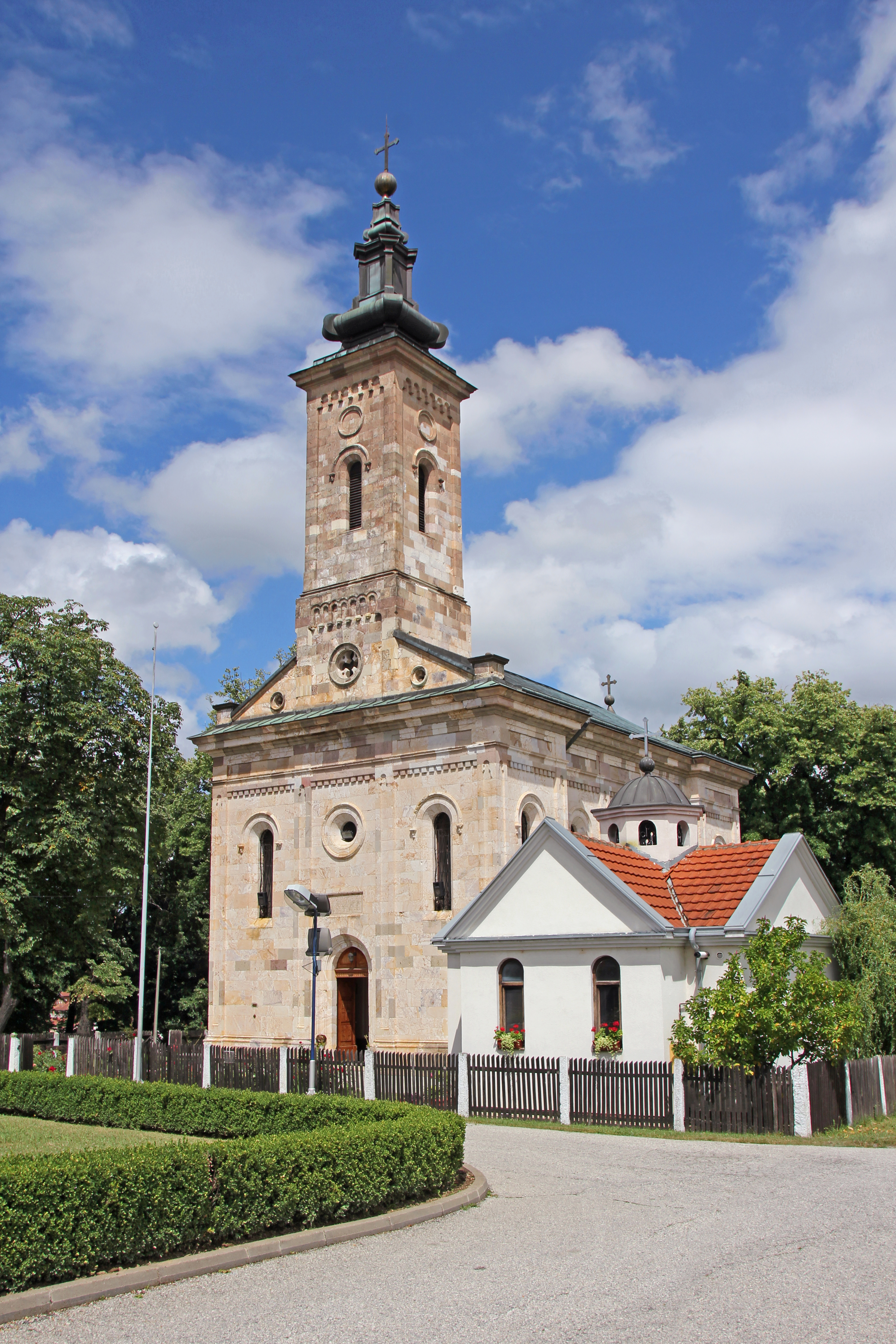
Church of St. Archangel Gavrilo

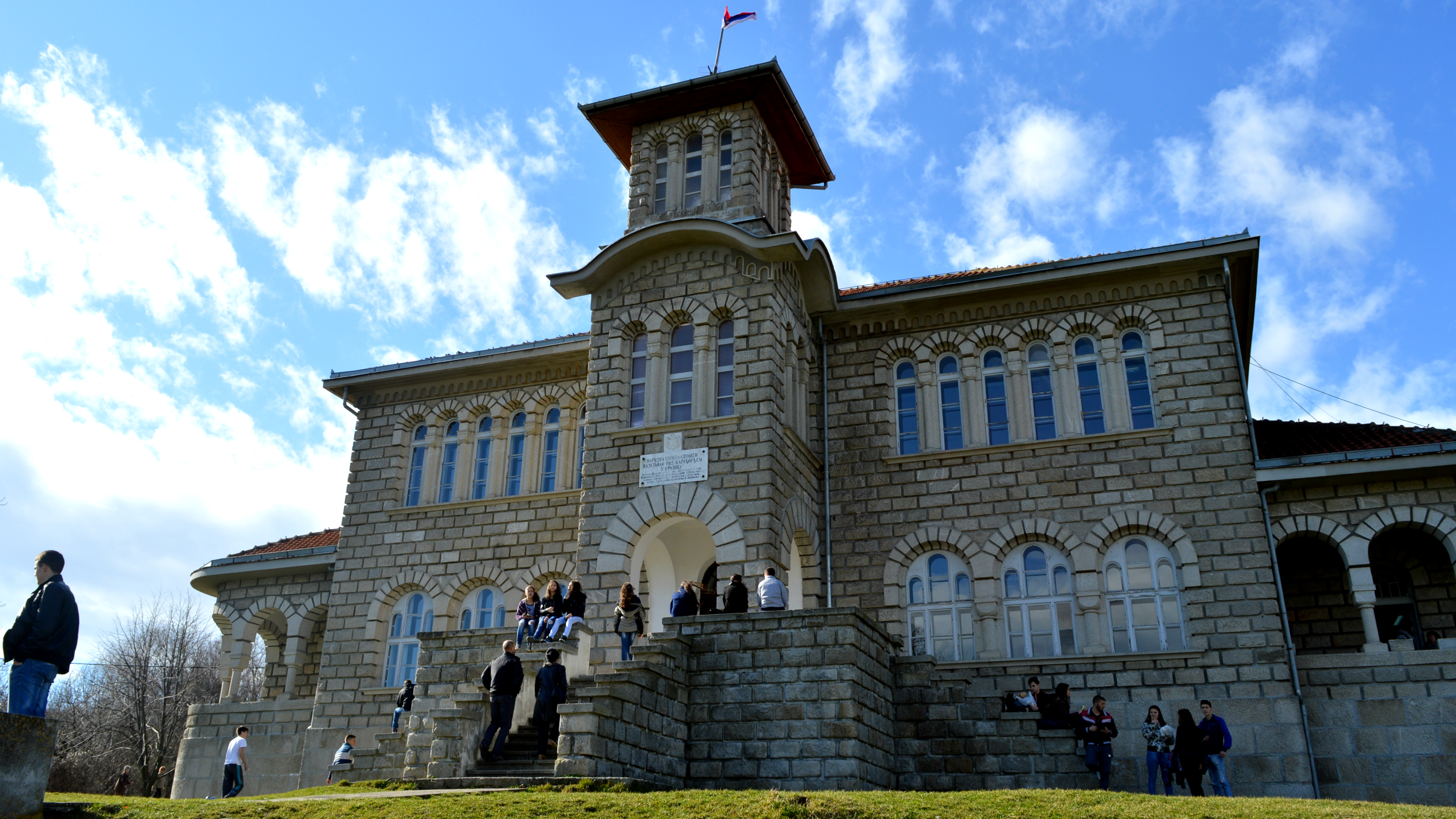
Orašac

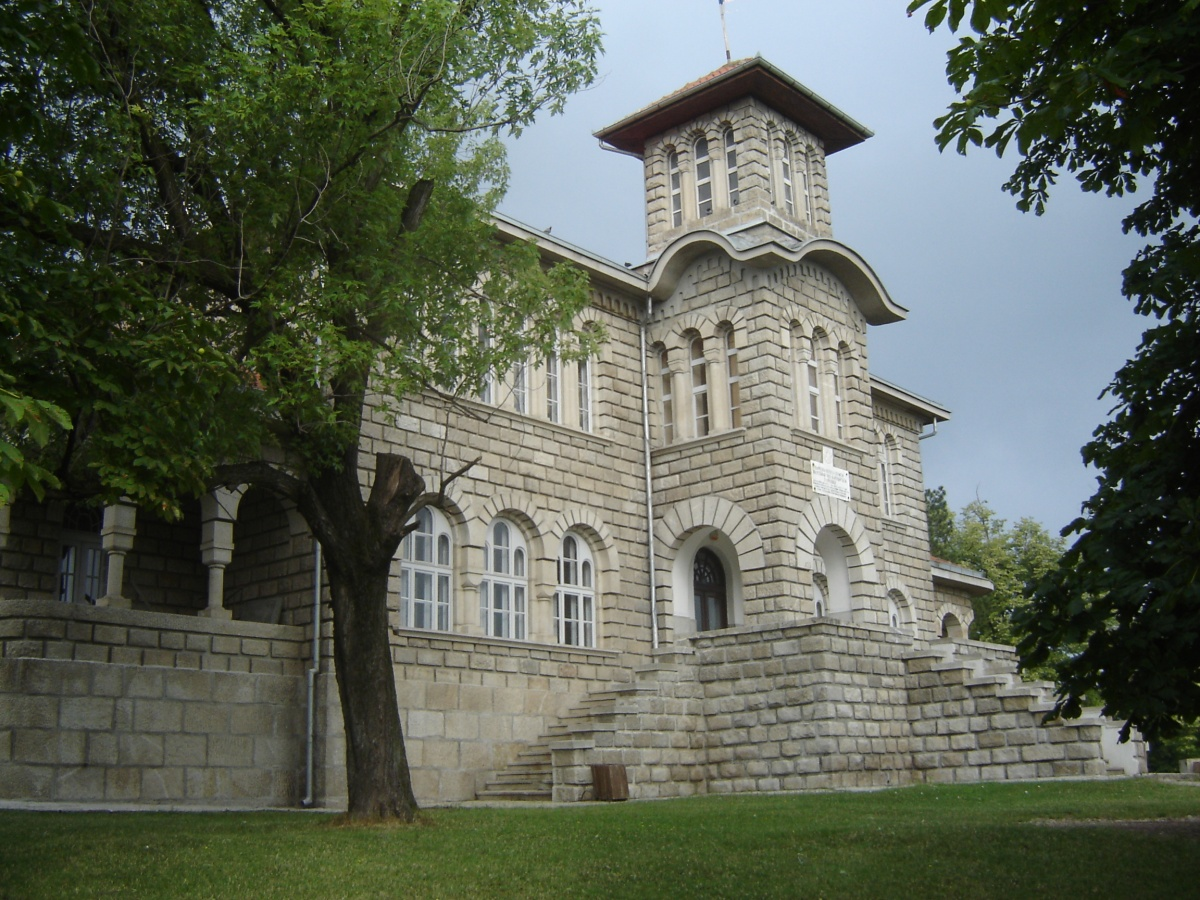
Orašac School Building

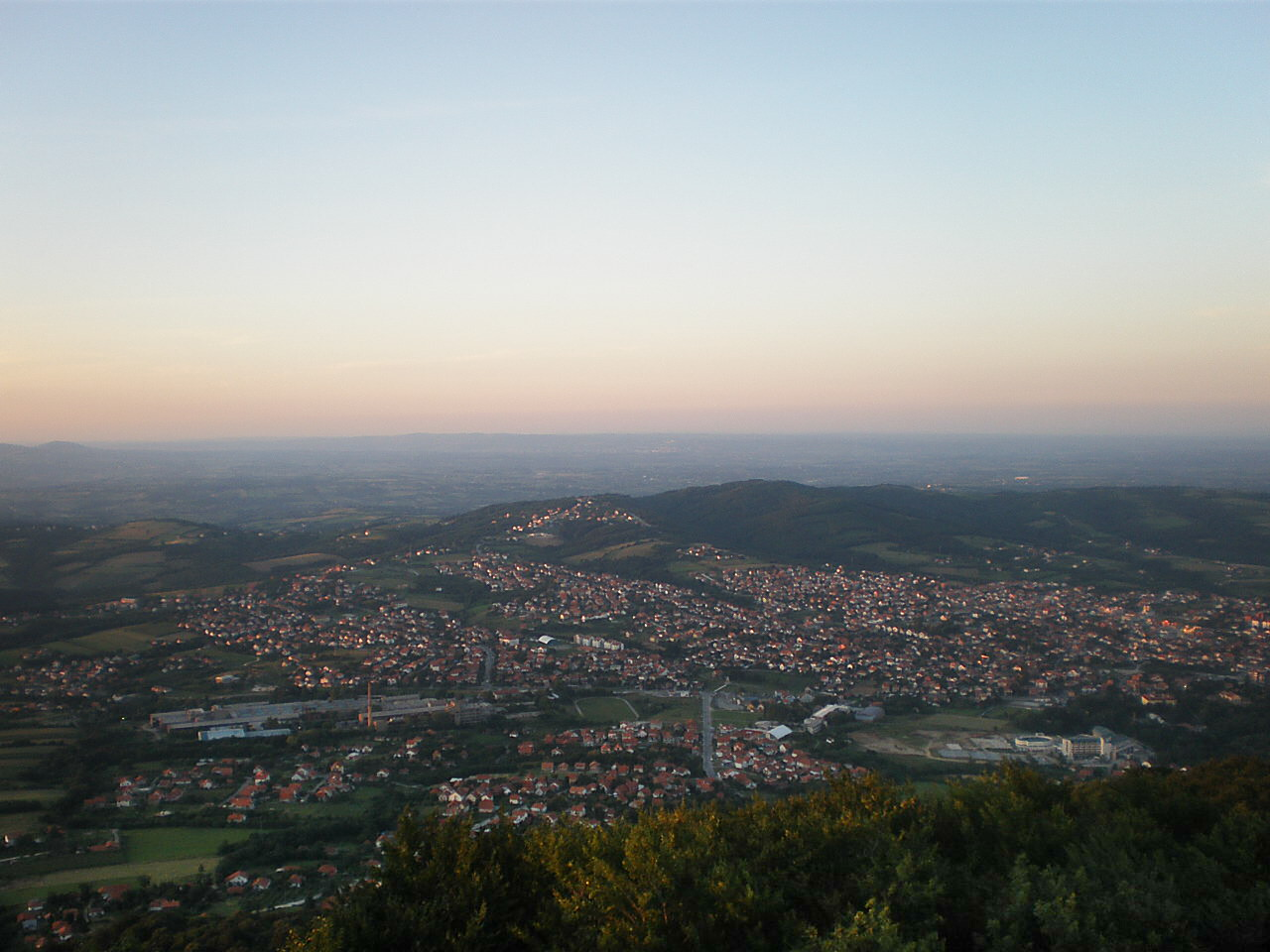
Aranđelovac town panorama

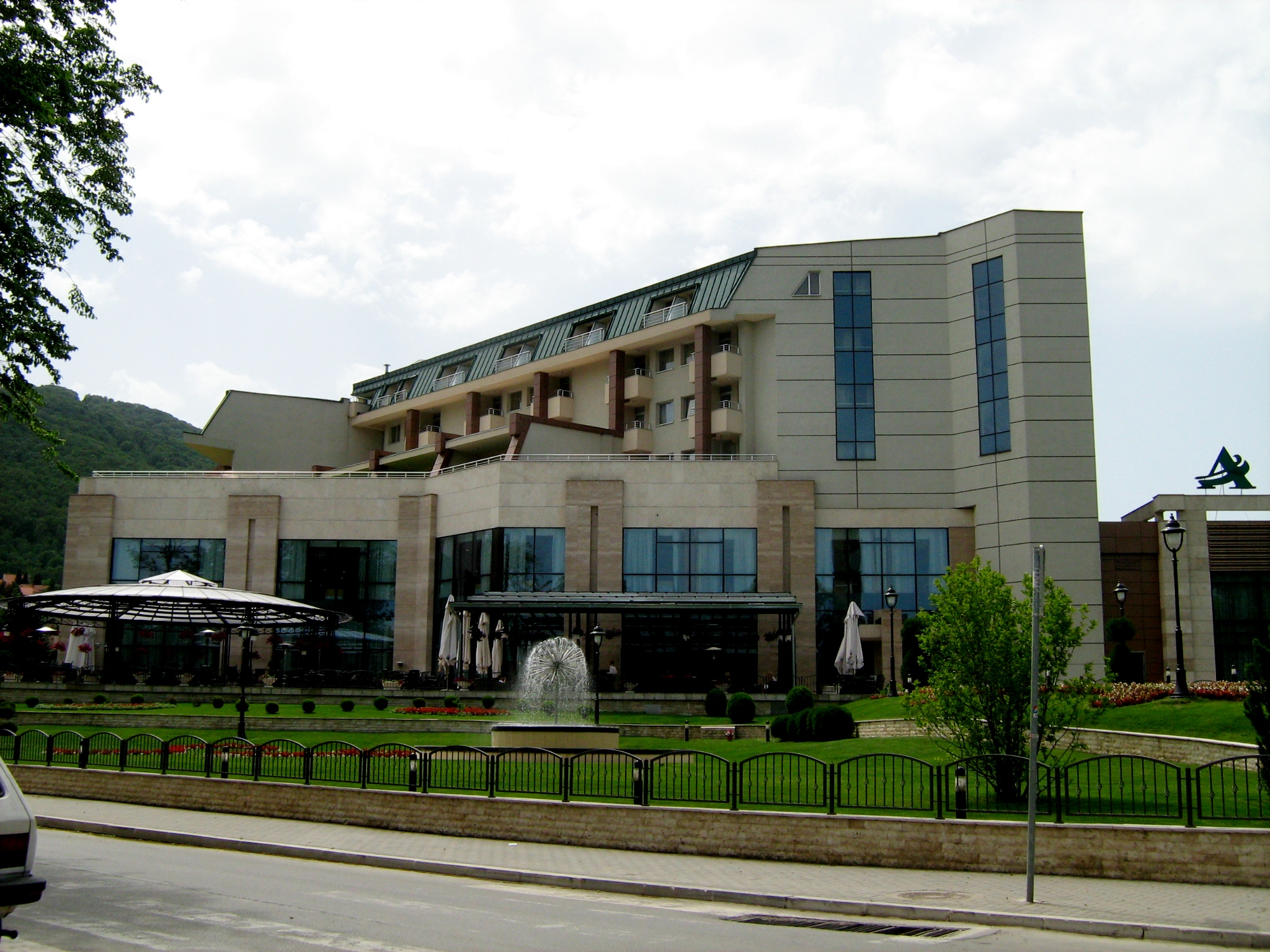
Hotel Izvor

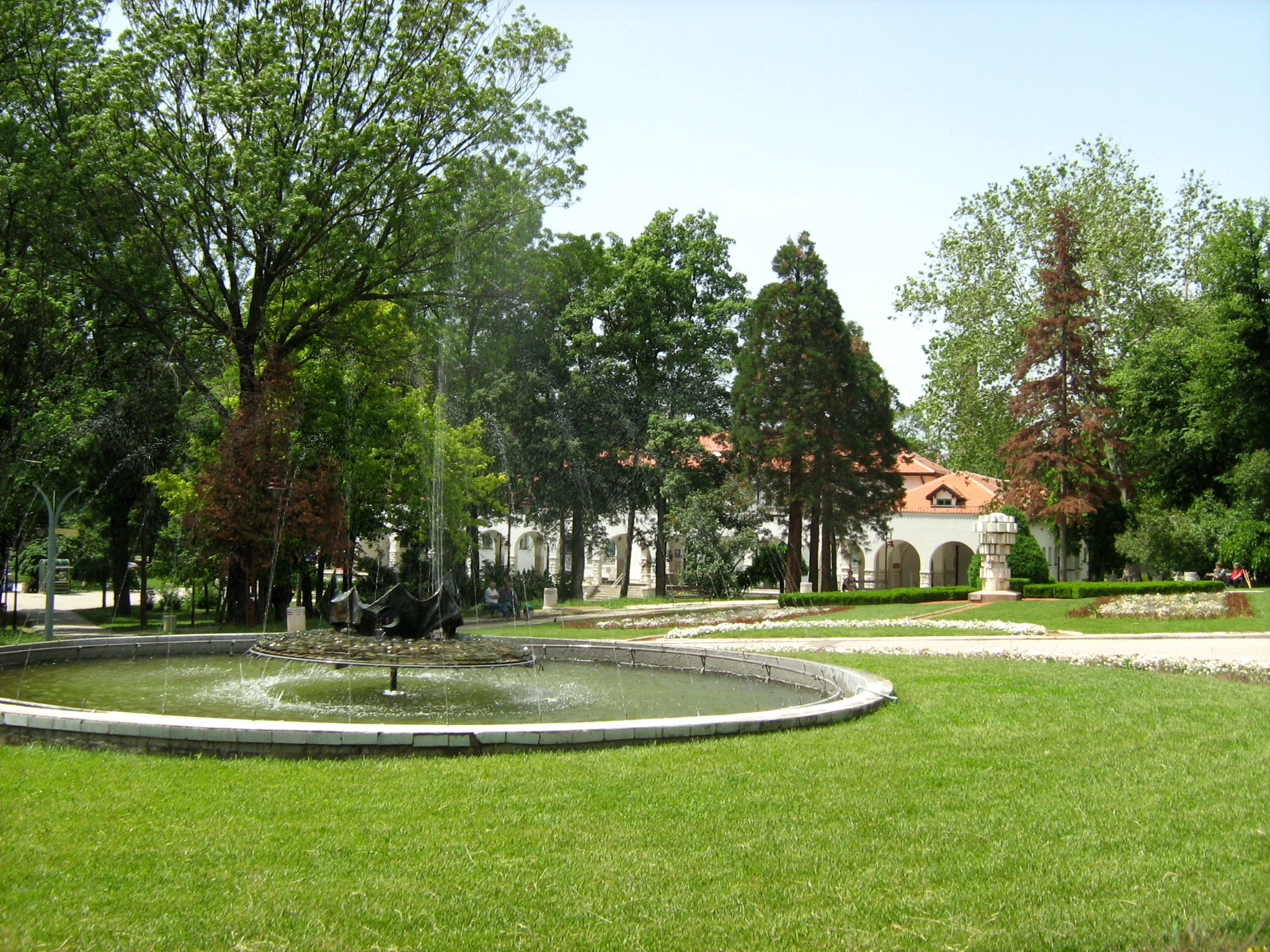
Town park fountain

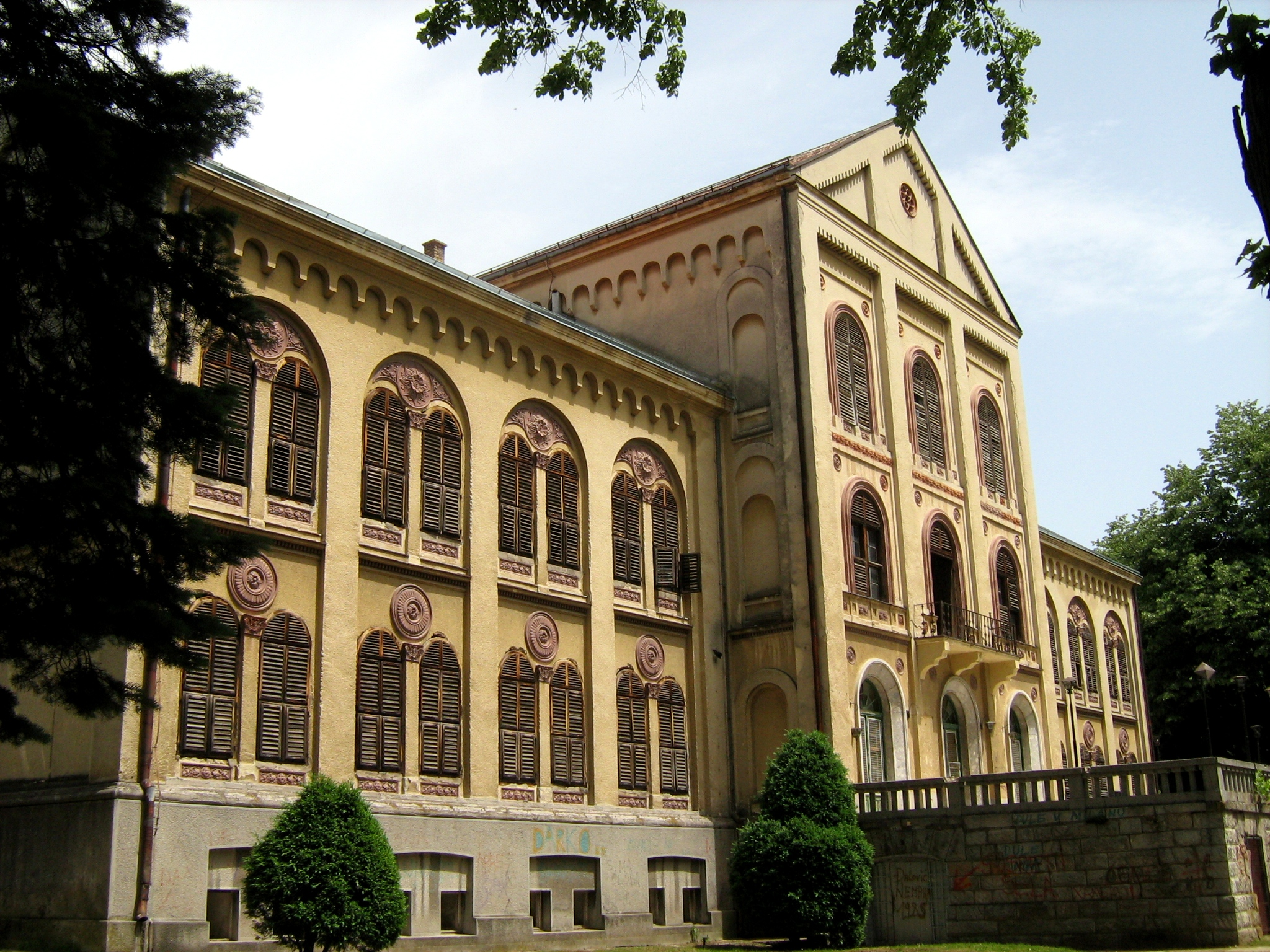
Staro zdanje Building

== Twin towns – sister cities ==
Aranđelovac is twinned with:

- Ptuj, Slovenia
- Han Pijesak, Bosnia and Herzegovina
- Kavala, Greece
- Turčianske Teplice, Slovakia
