= Stojnik (Aranđelovac) =

- Village
- Location within Serbia
- Coordinates: 44°22′37″N 20°37′35″E
- Country: Serbia
- District: Šumadija
- Municipality: Aranđelovac

Population (2002)
  - Total: 1,486
- Time zone: UTC+1 (CET)
  - Summer (DST): UTC+2 (CEST)

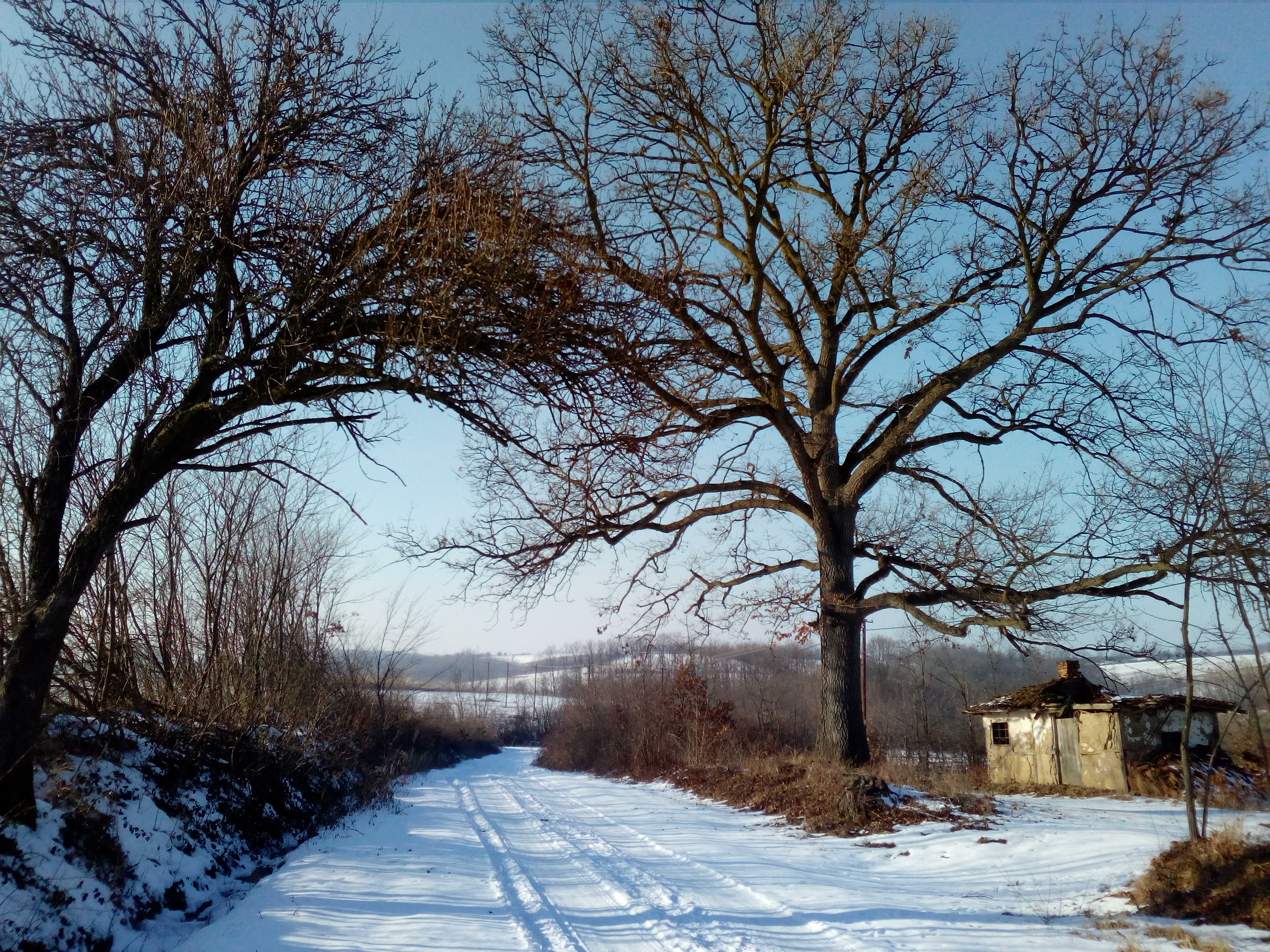
Stojnik, Serbia in winter.

Stojnik (Serbian Cyrillic: Стојник) is a village in the municipality of Aranđelovac, Serbia. According to the 2002 census, the village has a population of 1,486 people.
