= Jelovik (Aranđelovac) =

- Village
- Location within Serbia
- Coordinates: 44°16′N 20°28′E
- Country: Serbia
- District: Šumadija
- Municipality: Aranđelovac
- Elevation: 331 m (1,086 ft)

Population (2011)
  - Total: 375
- Time zone: UTC+1 (CET)
  - Summer (DST): UTC+2 (CEST)
- Postal code: 34309

Jelovik (Serbian: Јеловик) is a village in the municipality of Aranđelovac, Serbia. The village has a total area of 17.42 km^{2} and a population density of 21.53 per km^{2}.

== People of Jelovik ==
The population of Jelovik has been steadily declining since 1953. The population is 47.5% female (178), 52.5% male (197), and approximately 1.3x more people over the age of 70 than those under 19.

Recorded population
Year	Population (pre-2002 methodology)	Population (post-2002 methodology)
1948	1031	--
1953	1036	--
1961	969	--
1971	803	--
1981	686	--
1991	578	563
2002	493	480
2011	--	375
