= Igor (given name) =

Common Slavic given name

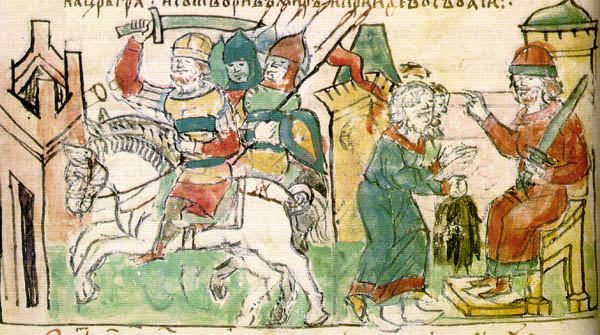
- Igor of Kiev, first from right. Illumination from the Radziwiłł Chronicle
- Gender: Male

Origin
- Origin: Old Norse
- Meaning: Protected by Yngvi
- Region of origin: Kievan Rus'

Other names
- Related names: Ingvar, Ingrid, Ingram

Igor (Belarusian: Ігар, romanized: Ihar [ˈiɣar]; Russian: Игорь, romanized: Igor' [ˈiɡərʲ]; Serbian Cyrillic: Игор, pronounced [îɡor]; Ukrainian: Ігор, romanized: Ihor [ˈiɦor]) is a common East Slavic given name derived from the Norse name Ingvar, that was brought to ancient Rus' by the Norse Varangians, see Igor of Kiev. The name can be translated as warrior under the protection of the god Ing or protector of the gods.

== People ==
=== Igor ===
- Igor of Kiev, ruler of Kievan Rus' from 913 to 945
- Igor II of Kiev (died 1147), Grand Prince of Kiev (1146)
- Igor Akinfeev (born 1986), Russian football goalkeeper
- Igor Andreev (born 1983), Russian tennis player
- Igor Angulo (born 1984), Basque-Spanish footballer
- Igor Antón (born 1983), Basque-Spanish cyclist
- Igor Arkhipov (born 1953), Russian politician
- Igor Arnáez (born 1991), Basque-Spanish footballer
- Igor Astarloa (born 1976), Basque-Spanish cyclist
- Igor Belousov (1928–2005), Soviet statesman
- Igor Bobček (born 1983), Slovak ice hockey defenceman
- Igor Bogdanoff (1949–2022), French science fiction author
- Igor Boki (born 1994), Belarusian Paralympic swimmer
- Igor Cavalera (born 1970), Brazilian musician
- Igor Chernykh (1932–2020), Russian camera operator
- Prince Igor Constantinovich of Russia (1894–1918), Russian royalty
- Igor Chugainov (born 1970), Russian football player and coach
- Igor Danchenko (born 1978), Russian-American analyst
- Igor M. Diakonoff (1915–1999), Russian historian, linguist, and translator
- Igor Dodon (born 1975), Moldovan politician and president of Moldova from 2016 to 2020
- Igor de Camargo (born 1983), Brazilian / Belgian footballer
- Igor Eremenko (born 1997), Russian ice dancer who defected to the United States
- Igor Gabilondo (born 1979), Basque-Spanish footballer
- Igor Gaydamaka, Soviet sprint canoer
- Igor Girkin (born 1970), Russian army veteran and former Federal Security Service officer who played a key role in the Russian annexation of Crimea
- Igor Golyak (born 1979), Ukrainian-American theatre director
- Igor Golomstock (1929–2017), London-based Russian art historian
- Igor González de Galdeano (born 1973), Basque-Spanish cyclist
- Igor Julio dos Santos de Paulo (born 1998), Brazilian footballer
- Igor Jankowski (born 1983), Belarusian-Polish composer
- Igor Kholmanskikh (born 1969), Russian government appointee and former factory worker
- Igor Coronado, Brazilian footballer
- Igor Kornelyuk (born 1962), Russian musician, singer and songwriter
- Igor Kokoškov (born 1971), Serbian basketball coach
- Igor Kopystiansky (born 1954), American artist
- Igor Kunitsyn (born 1981), Russian tennis player
- Igor Kurnosov (1985–2013), Russian chess grandmaster
- Igor Larionov (born 1960), Soviet and Russian retired ice hockey player
- Igor Lewczuk (born 1985), Polish football defender
- Igor López de Munain (1983/1984–2022), Basque politician
- Igor Luzhkovsky (1938–2000), Russian swimmer
- Igor Markevitch (1912–1983), Russian-born composer and conductor
- Igor Julio (born 1998), Brazilian footballer
- Igor Martinez (born 1989), Basque-Spanish footballer
- Igor Matovič (born 1973), Slovak politician
- Igor Medved (born 1981), Slovenian ski jumper
- Igor Menshchikov (born 1970), Russian football player and coach
- Igor Merino (born 1990), Basque-Spanish cyclist
- Igor V. Minin (born 1960), Russian physicist
- Igor Nesterenko (born 1990), Israeli-Ukrainian basketball player in the Israel Basketball Premier League
- Igor Nikitin (ice hockey) (1966–2013), Russian ice hockey player
- Igor Nikolayev (born 1960), Russian singer, composer and songwriter
- Igor Oistrakh (1931–2021), Russian violinist
- Igor Olshanetskyi (born 1986), Israeli Olympic weightlifter
- Igor Olshansky (born 1982), Ukrainian-born American National Football League player
- Igor Omura Fraga (born 1998), Japanese-born Brazilian racing driver and eSports racer
- Igor Paixão (born 2000), Brazilian footballer
- Igor Pavlov (athlete) (born 1979), Russian pole vaulter
- Igor Petrenko (born 1977), Russian actor of cinema and theater
- Igor Prokopenko (born 1965), Russian filmmaker and journalist
- Igor Rasko (born 1966), Russian ice hockey player
- Igor Savitsky (1915–1984), Russian art collector and art museum director.
- Igor Sechin (born 1960), Russian businessman and politician
- Igor Sedašev (born 1950), Estonian politician
- Igor Severyanin (1887–1941), Russian poet
- Igor Shesterkin (born 1995), Russian ice hockey player
- Igor Shuvalov (born 1967), Russian politician
- Igor Sokolov (born 2006), Russian famous clown
- Igor Sijsling (born 1987), Dutch tennis player
- Igor Sikorsky (1889–1972), Russian-born American pioneer of aviation in both helicopters and fixed-wing aircraft
- Igor Smirnov (politician) (born 1941), Transnistrian politician
- Igor Stravinsky (1882–1971), Russian composer and conductor
- Igor Subbotin (born 1990), Estonian footballer
- Igor Svyatoslavich (1151–1201/1202), prince of Putivl (1164–1180), of Novgorod-Seversk (1180–1198), and of Chernigov (1198–1201/1202)
- Igor Sypniewski (1974–2022), Polish football forward
- Igor Śmiałowski (1917–2006), Polish actor
- Igor Talkov (1956–1991), Russian singer-songwriter
- Igor Tudor (born 1978), Croatian footballer and manager
- Igor Ursov (1927–2002) Russian phthisiatrist, scientist
- Igor Yebra (born 1974), Basque-Spanish dancer
- Igor Zubeldia (born 1997), Basque-Spanish footballer

=== Ihar ===
- Ihar Hermianchuk (1961–2002), Belarusian journalist and political activist.
- Ihar Hershankou (1981–2018), convicted Belarusian murderer, soldier and fraudster
- Ihar Makarau (born 1979), Belarusian judoka
- Ihar Maystrenka (born 1959), Belarusian former rower
- Ihar Razhkow (born 1981), Belarusian footballer
- Ihar Rynkevich (born 1968), Belarusian legal and political expert, journalist and human rights activist
- Ihar Stasevich (born 1985), Belarusian footballer
- Ihar Tarlowski (born 1974), Belarusian footballer and coach
- Ihar Truhaw (born 1976), Belarusian footballer and coach
- Ihar Tsaplyuk (born 1970), Belarusian footballer
- Ihar Zyankovich (born 1987), Belarusian footballer
- Ihar Zyulew (born 1984), Belarusian footballer and coach

=== Ihor ===
- Ihor Bazhan (born 1981), Ukrainian footballer
- Ihor Blazhkov (1936–2026), Ukrainian conductor
- Ihor Chuchman (born 1985), Ukrainian footballer
- Ihor Della-Rossa (born 1939), Georgian-born Soviet racewalker
- Ihor Huz (born 1982), Ukrainian politician, member of Parliament
- Ihor Kalynets (1939–2025), Ukrainian poet and dissident during Soviet times
- Ihor Kharatin (born 1995), Ukrainian footballer
- Ihor Kharchenko (born 1962), Ukrainian diplomat
- Ihor Kirienko (born 1986), Ukrainian footballer
- Ihor Kohut (born 1996), Ukrainian footballer
- Ihor Kolykhaiev (born 1971), Ukrainian politician and entrepreneur
- Ihor Kolomoyskyi (born 1963), Ukrainian businessman
- Ihor Kononenko (born 1965) Ukrainian businessman and politician
- Ihor Kyrylenko (born 1991), Ukrainian singer, songwriter, producer and DJ, member in a number of musical bands
- Ihor Kyryukhantsev (born 1996), Ukrainian footballer
- Ihor Lytovchenko (born 1966), Ukrainian businessman and entrepreneur
- Ihor Lutsenko (politician) (born 1978), Ukrainian journalist and politician
- Ihor Melnyk (footballer, born 1983), Ukrainian footballer
- Ihor Melnyk (footballer, born 1986), Ukrainian footballer
- Ihor Nasalyk (born 1962), Ukrainian optoelectronic engineer and politician
- Ihor Olefirenko (born 1990), Ukrainian long distance runner
- Ihor Pavlyuk (born 1967), Ukrainian writer, translator and research worker
- Ihor Plastun (born 1990), Ukrainian footballer
- Ihor Podolchak (born 1962), Ukrainian film director and visual artist
- Ihor Prokopchuk (born 1968), Ukrainian diplomat
- Ihor Rainin or Raynin (born 1973), Ukrainian politician
- Ihor Reptyukh (born 1994), Ukrainian cross-country skier and biathlete
- Ihor Rybak (1934–2005), Ukrainian weightlifter
- Ihor Reznichenko (born 1994), Ukrainian figure skater
- Ihor Sahach (born 1956), Ukrainian diplomat
- Ihor Shcherbak (1943–2002), Soviet long-distance runner
- Ihor Shevchenko (born 1971), Ukrainian politician, government minister, and lawyer
- Ihor Ševčenko (1922–2009), Polish-born philologist and historian of Ukrainian origin
- Ihor Sorkin (born 1967), Ukrainian banker, chairman of the National Bank of Ukraine
- Ihor Surkis (born 1958), Ukrainian businessman
- Ihor Tsvietov (born 1994), Ukrainian Paralympic athlete with cerebral palsy
- Ihor Tyschenko (born 1989), Ukrainian footballer
- Ihor Yukhnovskyi (1925–2024), Ukrainian physicist and politician, and a member of the Presidium
- Ihor Yushko (born 1961), Ukrainian economist and politician
- Ihor Zubko (born 1991), Ukrainian footballer

== Fictional characters ==
- Igor (character), a stock character
- The race of Igors, who are all called Igor or Igorina, in the Discworld book series by Sir Terry Pratchett
- Igor, a baboon with shape-shifting powers in Marvel Comics
- Igor, in the Persona series
- Igor, in the album Igor
- Igor, in Count Duckula
- Igor, in Young Frankenstein
- Igor, in the 1989 US fighting game Human Killing Machine
- Igor, in the 1985 US horror film Igor and the Lunatics
- Igor, in the 2008 US computer-animated horror comedy film Igor
- Igor, one of the Iron Legion suits in Iron Man 3
- Igor Barkov, in the 1998 young adult novel Holes
- Igor Burov, in the US TV drama series The Americans
- Igor Karkaroff, in the Harry Potter series
- Igor Nevsky, in the 1997 US political action thriller film Air Force One (film)
- Igor Parker, in the 1994 graphic adventure game Igor: Objective Uikokahonia
- Igor Rabitov, in the US action TV series Banshee
- Igor Sergei Klinki (created October 10, 1959), "virtual" poet, created by Argentine writer, artist, photographer, and illustrator Rafael San Martín
- Igor Stancheck, in Radioactive Man
- Igor Straminsky, in the US media franchise M*A*S*H
- Igor Teplov, in World of Watches
- Igor Wagner, in The Adventures of Tintin
- Igor Khymynuk, in Chernobylite (video game)
