= Teodosije Marićević =

Teodosije Marićević (1760–29 April 1805) was a Knyaz of Orašac and Jasenica and a merchant. He participated in the first Serbian National assembly at Ostružnica near Belgrade in April and May 1804 during the First Serbian Uprising.

== Biography ==
Marićević was born in Orašac. He was an associate of Mladen Milovanović. On the eve of the uprising, as knez (prince) of Orašac and Jasenica, he took part in the Orašac Assembly (14 February 1804), which decided on the election of the leader of the uprising. He rejected the proposal to become the rebel leader, and instead proposed Karađorđe, who had called the meeting and was experienced. In the first phase of the uprising, against the Dahije, Marićević was one of the most prominent rebel leaders.

Due to his carelessness, the Serbs suffered a minor defeat in the first conflict with the Turks near Batočina (mid-April 1804), and Tosun Agha managed to break through the road he was guarding without a fight. That is why Karađorđe suspected treason.

When he realized that he was losing power in Karađorđe's favor, he joined the opposition, being the first of the rebel leaders to do so openly. At the Pećani Assembly (29 April 1805), he started a fight by openly demanding Karađorđe to give over the supreme leadership to him. Teodosije drew his pistol to kill Karađorđe, who instead managed to shoot and kill Teodosije.

== Sources ==
- Novaković, Stojan (1904). Устанак на дахије 1804 [Uprising against the Dahije]. Штампано у Државној штампарији – via Archive.org.

Other offices
Preceded by Nikola Jovanović (?)	knez of Jasenica ? – 1805	Succeeded by Matija Jovičić
