= Klinki =

Klinki may refer to:

- Klinki pine, vernacular name of the conifer Araucaria hunsteinii
- Igor Sergei Klinki
- Klinki (village), village in Pskov Oblast, Russia

== See also ==
- Micropsectra klinki, a fly of genus Micropsectra
