= Matija Jovičić =

Serbian commander in the First Serbian Uprising

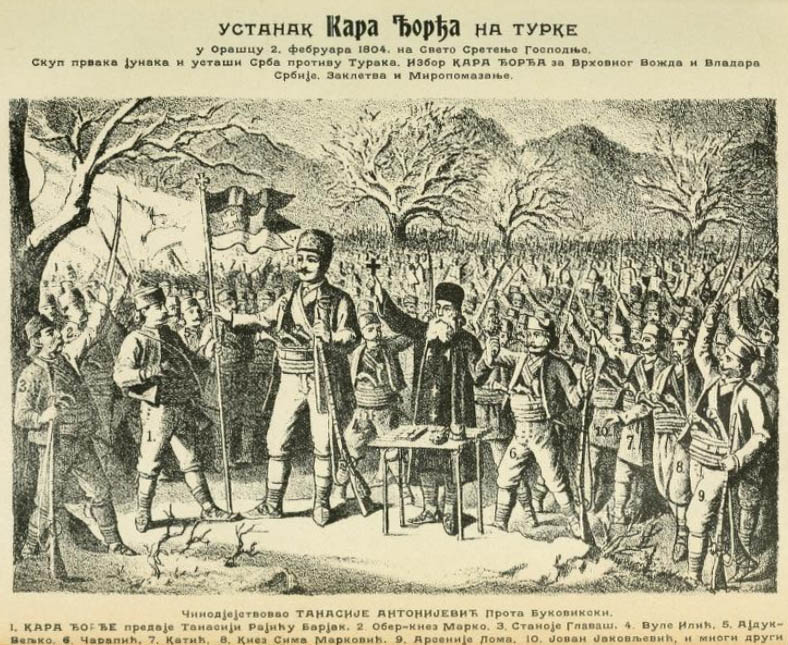
- Illustration of the Orašac Assembly from Život i dela Kara-Đorđa (1903).
- Born: Matija (or Mateja) Jovičić; 1755; Topola, Ottoman Empire (now Serbia)
- Died: after 1820; Topola, Principality of Serbia (now Serbia)
- Cause of death: Natural causes
- Military career
- Allegiance: Revolutionary Serbia (1804–1815)
- Service years: 1804–1815
- Rank: knez
- Nickname: Topolac
- Unit: Kragujevac nahija army
- Commands: Jasenica
- Known for: knez (mayor)
- Conflicts: First Serbian Uprising; Second Serbian Uprising

Matija Jovičić (Serbian: Матија Јовичић; 1755–1820) was a Serb village mayor (knez) and revolutionary that participated in the First Serbian Uprising, notably as a mayor of Jasenica. He was the father of politician Ranko Matejić.

== Life ==
Jovičić (a patronymic) was born in 1755 in Topola in the Kragujevac nahiya. The village was part of the Jasenica knežina (Serb self-governing area) in the Šumadija region. Jovičić was a hajduk (brigand) that joined the Serbian Free Corps and fought in the Austro-Turkish War (1788–1791). At the end of the war, Jovičić was a member of a 15-man-band that continued fighting in Šumadija, among whom were also Austrian officer Karađorđe. The hajduk band was dispersed some time in 1791, and Jovičić ended his career as a hajduk.

He became the village knez (mayor) of Topola. During the tyrannical rule of the renegade Janissaries known as the Dahije, the local Turk leader was Osman, while Jovičić was a representative of the local Serbs. He participated at the Orašac Assembly (14 February 1804) where hundreds of influential Serbs met and decided on an uprising against the Dahije. He was among those friends and trusted that Karađorđe collected in Topola on the way, prior to the meeting. With Aleksa Dukić, Jovičić led men who burnt down inns in the area. Jovičić rallied men of Topola, and then wider across Jasenica, into Karađorđe's rebel army. He organized at least two armed bands.

Jovičić accompanied Karađorđe at Rudnik, the mustering at Topola, and liberation of Jagodina in March–April 1804. He then went with Karađorđe and rose up other regions. At the Pećani Assembly (29 April 1805), Teodosije Marićević, the knez of Jasenica, started a fight by openly demanding Karađorđe to give over the supreme leadership to him; Teodosije drew his pistol to kill Karađorđe, who instead managed to shoot and kill Teodosije. After expulsion of Turks from several nahijas in 1805, Karađorđe appointed Jovičić the knez (or obor-knez) of the Jasenica knežina. Jovičić stayed in Jasenica and governed the area, having more of a judicial office than military. He was said to have been calm and gentle by nature, a good and just judge, respected among the people. His son, Ranko Matejić, at a very young age became kapetan (captain) in 1812 and participated in battles. With the suppression of the Serbian uprising in 1813, Jovičić and his son remained in Serbia, and he continued serving as a knez under the Ottoman government. When the Second Serbian Uprising broke out in 1815, Jovičić and his son joined with the Kragujevac nahija. At the request of vojvoda Miloš Obrenović, Jovičić gathered Topola. Jovičić accompanied Miloš Obrenović, Avram Lukić and Otašević to Bosnia, meeting with Hurshid Pasha. Jovičić and Miloš returned to Serbia, while Lukić and Otašević, held as hostages, were executed after Miloš refused to surrender. After the Ottoman–Serbian peace reached between Miloš and Marashli Ali Pasha, of which discussions Jovičić participated in, Jovičić returned to Topola where he lived an ordinary life and died, in 1820.

His son Ranko served as a captain in Miloš's reign and a provincial mayor and politician under Prince Aleksandar Karađorđević.

== See also ==
- List of people of the First Serbian Uprising
- Timeline of the Serbian Revolution
- Serbian Army (revolutionary)

== Annotations ==
1. K. Protić calls him simply "knez Matija". K. Nenadović calls him by the demonym Topolac (Тополац). His given name is also spelt Mateja.

== Sources ==
- Batalaka, Lazar Arsenijević (1898). Историја српског устанка, део први [History of the Serbian Uprising: Part One]. Vol. I. Izd. Batalakinoga fonda – via Google Books.
- Nenadović, Konstantin N. (1884). Живот и дела великог Ђорђа Петровића Кара-Ђорђа. Vol. II (1 ed.). Vienna: У Штампарији Јована Н. Вернаја – via Google Books.
- Nenadović, Konstantin N. (1903) [1883]. Живот и дела великог Ђорђа Петровића Кара-Ђорђа. Vol. I (2 ed.). Belgrade: Штампа Савића и Комп. – via Archive.org.
- Novaković, Stojan (1904). Устанак на дахије 1804 [Uprising against the Dahije]. Штампано у Државној штампарији – via Archive.org.
- Pavlović, Vojislav G.; Milosavljević, Boris (2020). Београдски родослови. Balkanološki institut SANU. ISBN 978-86-7179-110-6.
- Protić, Kosta (1893). "Ратни догађаји из првога српског устанка под Карађорђем Петровићем 1804—1813". Годишњица Николе Чупића. XIII. Državna štamparija.
- Šakota, Slavko (1966). Topola i Oplenac. Turistička štampa.
- Vukićević, Milenko M. (1907). Карађорђе (1752–1804) [Karađorđe]. Vol. 1. Државна штампарија Краљевине Србије – via Archive.org.

Other offices
| Preceded by Teodosije Marićević | knez of Jasenica; 1805 – 1813 | Succeeded by ? |
