= Svetolik Ranković =

Serbian writer (1863 - 1899)

- Светолик Ранковић
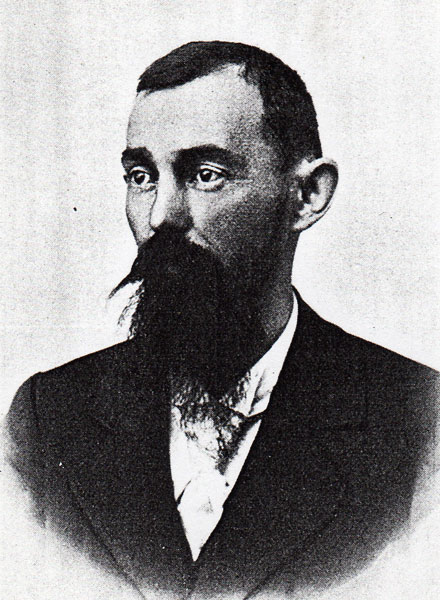
- Portrait of Svetolik Ranković
- Born: 12 July 1863; Velika Moštanica, Principality of Serbia
- Died: 18 March 1899 (aged 35); Belgrade, Kingdom of Serbia
- Occupations: Novelist, short story writer, dramatist
- Writing career
- Literary movement: Literary realism

Svetolik Ranković (Serbian Cyrillic: Светолик Ранковић; Velika Moštanica, Principality of Serbia, 7 December 1863 – Belgrade, Kingdom of Serbia, 18 March 1899) was a Serbian writer prominent in the period of Realism. As a realist, he was the first Serbian author to take a significant step towards the emancipation of prose from the laws of event-centered narration. He was referred to as the Russian pupil for his elegant style.

== Early life ==
His father Pavle was a teacher in Velika Moštanica at the time of Svetolik's birth, and became a priest after the family moved to Garaši, a village in the Kragujevac district, near Arandjelovac. Ranković completed his high school and seminary in 1884 in Belgrade, and then went to Kyiv Theological Academy and graduated from there. In Kiev, Ranković became acquainted with theological and philosophical sciences and the history of Russian and world literature. The works of Turgenev, Tolstoy, Dostoyevsky, Gogol, Goncharov, Schedrin, Korolenko, and other Russian writers had the greatest influence on him.

While Ranković was on summer vacation in 1886, bandits attacked the family home and killed his father Pavle, and tortured his mother and others. Based on this experience, Ranković wrote The Mountain King (Gorski tsar) where the main character becomes a hajduk and descends into violence and murder. Such literary depictions of hajduks were contrary to their popular romanticism and heroic portrayals of the time.

== Ministry ==
After graduating from the Theological Academy in 1888, Svetolik returned to Serbia and began working as a religious education teacher at a Gymnasium in Kragujevac. In 1893, he was transferred to the Belgrade Theological Seminary, and in 1894, he was transferred again, to Niš. In 1897, he established himself as a gymnasium religious education teacher in Belgrade. Dissatisfied with his precarious status as a temporary acting part-time teacher, he intended to leave the profession. In 1890, he passed the professorship exam with an excellent grade for his dissertation "On Church Oratory".

== Writing work ==
In 1892, he published the story "Autumn of a Picture" in the magazine Otadžbina. He fell ill with tuberculosis in 1897 but recovered in Garaši. The novel Gorski tsar, written a little earlier in Niš, was published as the 38th book of "Kola" by the Serbian Literary Cooperative. In 1898, he sought salvation from tuberculosis in the Bukovo monastery, where he wrote his second novel, Seoska učitejica. In the fall, he went to Herceg-Novi for treatment, where he completed his best story, The Old Vruska Man, and began his third novel, Broken Ideals. The Matica srpska awarded "Seoska učitejica," and the Kolarac Foundation awarded it and took it to print.

After the death of his youngest son in 1899, he moved to Belgrade, where he died of tuberculosis at the age of 36. He had been teaching at Saint Sava's Seminary in Belgrade until then. In 1900, the Serbian Literary Cooperative published the manuscript of "Broken Ideals" as its 62nd book, "The Mountain King," (Gorski Tsar) which Ranković completed in the last weeks of his life on his deathbed.

He was married to Bosilka, with whom he had three children.

== Bibliography ==
- Горски цар, The Mountain King (novel), Belgrade 1897;
- Сеоска учитељица, The Village Teacher, Belgrade 1898;
- Порушени идеали, Broken Ideals, Belgrade 1900;
- Слике из живота, Pictures from Life, Belgrade 1904;
- Целокупна дела -{I, II, III}- Collected Works, Serbian Writers“, Belgrade 1928;
- Сабрана дела -{I, II}-, Selected Works (I, II) Belgrade 1952.
