= Mark Zeltser =

Mark Efimovich Zeltser (born 8 April 1947) is a Soviet-born American pianist.

== Biography ==
Zeltser was born in Kishinev in 1947. His mother Bertha was a concert pianist and teacher. Her grandfather, Mark Pester, was a well-known Bessarabian violinist (a classmate of Jascha Heifetz, Mischa Elman and Efrem Zimbalist at the St. Petersburg Conservatory) and conductor. Mark Zeltser was a child prodigy in mathematics. He began his piano studies with his mother. At eight he gave his first public recital and at nine performed concertos by Haydn and Grieg. He was admitted to the Moscow Conservatory without being required to take the entrance examinations due to his proven talents. It was the only time that such a concession has ever been made in the history of the Moscow Conservatory.

While still a student, Mark Zeltser entered and won several major competitions, including the National Competition in Moscow, Grand Prix at the Marguerite Long-Jacques Thibaud Competition in Paris, and the Busoni Prize at the Ferruccio Busoni International Piano Competition in Bolzano, Italy. He graduated from the conservatory with a Doctor of Musical Arts degree. Zeltser then served as a professor at the Conservatory and at the Moldavian State Conservatory, before beginning his performing career.

Since 1977, he has conducted master classes at various festivals and teaching programs throughout the United States, Eastern and Western Europe, Korea, Japan and Australia. In 1983, a concert by Zeltser in Bologna, Italy, attracted an audience of over 50,000, which has been claimed to be an all-time record for paid public attendance for classical music.

Zeltser has appeared with many of the world's leading orchestras, such as the Berlin Philharmonic, the Chicago Symphony Orchestra, the Philadelphia Orchestra, the New York Philharmonic, the Boston Symphony Orchestra, the Cleveland Orchestra, the Los Angeles Philharmonic, the Toronto Symphony Orchestra, the Montreal Symphony Orchestra, the Royal Philharmonic Orchestra, l'Orchestre National de France, the Moscow Philharmonic Orchestra and the Tokyo Philharmonic Orchestra. He appeared under Herbert von Karajan many times. His recording with Yo-Yo Ma and Anne-Sophie Mutter of the Beethoven Triple Concerto under Karajan has been included in "The 100 Best Classical Recordings Of The 20th Century". Zeltser has performed nearly 20 times with the Berlin Philharmonic under von Karajan. He has also recorded works by Balakirev, Prokofiev and Rachmaninoff.

In 1998 Zeltser was appointed Professor of Music at the Centenary College of Louisiana.

He and his wife reside in Manhattan. Their daughter Elizabeth Zeltser is a violinist, and their grandson Lucas Voloshin is a pianist. Mark Zeltser's brother, Emanuel Zeltser, a lawyer, was imprisoned in Belarus and held there as a political hostage. He was released due to the joint efforts of the world leaders and Amnesty International.

Zeltser and his wife have created a commercial website through which they aim to make available every piece of classical music ever written.
