= Alexander Murylev =

Russian serial killer

- Born: Alexander Vladimirovich Murylev; 31 March 1971 (age 55); Moscow, RSFSR
- Other name: "Yeltsin's Culler" (Note: In Russian, there’s a common phrase, «волки — санитары леса» (“wolves are the forest’s cullers”), which means that wolves help maintain the health of wild animal populations by eliminating weak and diseased individuals. In this context, «санитар» refers to someone who works to keep the environment clean and sanitary. In addition to referring to Yeltsin's term as president, the nickname might also allude to the economic liberalization and privatization carried out by his administration. These policies were sometimes perceived as predatory towards vulnerable population groups.)
- Conviction: Murder
- Penalty: Death; commuted to life imprisonment

Details
- Victims: 8
- Span of crimes: 1993–1994
- Country: Russia
- State: Moscow
- Weapons: Knife, crossbow
- Date apprehended: 1994
- Imprisoned at: White Swan Prison, Solikamsk, Perm Krai

Alexander Vladimirovich Murylev (Russian: Алекса́ндр Влади́мирович Мурылёв; born 31 March 1971), known as Yeltsin's Culler (Russian: Санитар Ельцина), is a Russian serial killer and former real estate broker. Between 1993 and 1994, he killed eight people in order to seize and then sell their apartments, making him one of the first black realtors in Russia.

== Biography ==
=== Early life ===
Alexander Murylev was born in 1971 in the family of an officer of the Soviet Army. Before coming of age, he lived with his family in East Germany, where his father held a high position in the counterintelligence headquarters of the Group of Soviet Forces.

After returning to the USSR, Murylev enrolled in a medical school. Upon graduation, he served as a feldsher in a military hospital during his army service. After demobilization, Murylev attempted to enrol in the MSU Faculty of Journalism but was unsuccessful. He then worked as a freelance correspondent for several Moscow print media outlets.

During an assignment for one of the editorial offices, Murylev visited a metropolitan casino and became addicted to gambling. He began to spend all his free time in gambling houses and eventually lost a significant amount of money. This financial loss led him to start committing crimes.

=== Murders ===
Murylev was well versed in privatization and housing sales, largely due to his journalistic work. In one of his articles titled "Small Privatization—A Great Swimming", followed by "And What About the Big One?", he raised the issue of real estate privatization in Moscow. Murylev knew that the law was hastily passed, requiring only a power of attorney to sell someone's apartment.

Murylev carefully investigated places where marginalized individuals, particularly single alcoholics, gathered. He would treat his victims to alcohol and, after ensuring they had no close relatives, offer to sell or exchange their apartment for a large sum of money. Tempted by the offer, they would agree and sign a power of attorney for Murylev. He would then kill them using various methods, always checking their pulse to confirm death.

His first murder occurred in July 1993, when he killed Petr Zheleztsov, a lone apartment owner. He initially shot Zheleztsov with a crossbow and then with an underwater harpoon. Murylev disposed of the body in the Moskva River, where it was discovered on 30 July. The body could not be identified at the time and was cremated as an unknown person. However, a year later, Zheleztsov's brother identified the corpse by a wristwatch that had been preserved.

In the same July 1993, Murylev committed three more murders. He killed Vladimir Troshin and his mistress Vinokurova in Troshin's apartment. After the murders, Murylev wrapped the bodies in a blanket, called a taxi, travelled to another part of the city, and dumped the bodies in a sewer manhole. The bodies were discovered only a year later, thanks to Murylev's own testimony. Later that month, Murylev committed another murder, killing a man named Sidorov using a kitchen hatchet.

In September 1993, Murylev tried to persuade a man named Alexander Ershov to grant him a power of attorney to sell Ershov's apartment. Ershov refused and reported the attempt to the police. A week later, Murylev took Ershov out of the city and shot him with a TT pistol.

Six months later, in March 1994, Murylev killed a mother and daughter, both named Petukhova, who were suffering from alcoholism. He strangled the elder Petukhova with a rope and killed the daughter by pressing down on her carotid artery. He disposed of their bodies in a sewer manhole, where they were soon discovered. The next day, Murylev brought an intoxicated man named Alexander Bulanenkov to the same manhole and placed him on the edge. Bulanenkov lost balance, fell in, and drowned.

In the spring of 1994, Murylev began selling the apartments he had seized from his victims. During an inspection of an apartment, a real estate agent was detained and implicated Murylev. Two days later, Murylev was arrested at the Belorussky railway station in Moscow.

=== Trial and sentence ===
Murylev soon confessed to the murders of eight people, providing detailed descriptions of his crimes to the investigators. During one of the interrogations, he told the investigator that he was "Yeltsin's culler," claiming that he was helping to clear Russia of marginalized people. Some of the bodies were only found following Murylev's testimony.

In 1996, the Moscow City Court sentenced Alexander Murylev to death. However, due to a moratorium on the death penalty, his sentence was commuted to life imprisonment in a special regime colony. As of 2021, Murylev was serving his sentence in the White Swan prison. His accomplice, notary Igor Agarkov, who falsified powers of attorney, was sentenced to six years in prison.

Murylev later told journalists that he was innocent and a victim of a judicial error:

...I learned about the illegal activities of the Islamic Cultural Center in Moscow, which was sending young Muslims to Saudi Arabia with Wahhabi money. I collected a whole dossier on these underground workers. These gangsters pinned eight of their own murders on me and framed me under the firing squad article to get me out of their way....

== See also ==
- List of Russian serial killers
