= Igor Ursov =

Soviet and Russian physician (1927–2002)

Igor G. Ursov
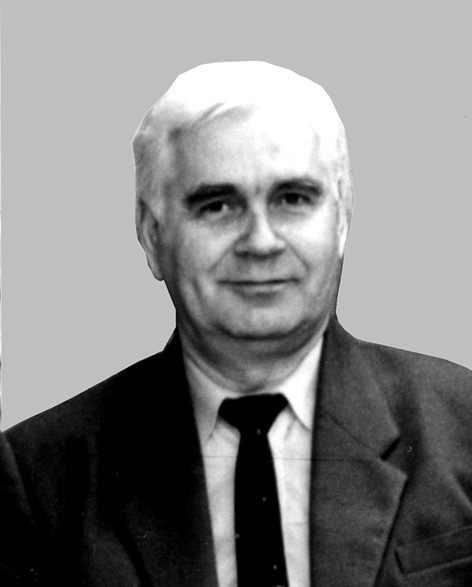
- Игорь Григорьевич Урсов
- Born: 20 January 1927; Kalashnikovo, Novotorzhsky District, Kalinin Oblast, Soviet Union
- Died: 20 June 2002 (aged 75); Novosibirsk, Russian Federation
- Education: I.M. Sechenov First Moscow State Medical University
- Awards: Order of the Badge of Honour (1976); Honorary Physician of the RSFSR (1968)
- Scientific career
- Fields: TB Control; Infectious Disease; Healthcare management
- Workplaces: Novosibirsk TB Research Institute; Novosibirsk State Medical University

Igor Grigorievich Ursov (Russian: Игорь Григорьевич Урсов, Russian pronunciation: [ˈiɡərʲ ˈursof]; 20 January 1927 – 20 June 2002) was a Soviet Russian tuberculosis specialist and organizer of public health who achieved tuberculosis control breakthroughs in Russia.

== Biography ==
Igor Grigorievich Ursov was born in 1927 to parents Grigory Ivanovich Ursov and Natalia Petrovna Drobot. His father came from a large Cossack family from southern Krasnodar and was a glass production engineer. His mother also came from a large family. She worked with her husband on new glass plants. After Igor Ursov graduated from a special Air Force high school with a gold medal, he applied at the Moscow Aviation Institute but was unsuccessful. He was accepted to the Moscow Power Engineering Institute's Department of Radio. After a year and a half of study, he decided to change to the medical field. He applied to Kuban Medical Institute and passed entrance exams. There he studied with Sergei Grigorievich Drozdov. Later Ursov transferred to the I.M. Sechenov First Moscow State Medical University and studied under the guidance of prominent teachers and professors at this university, such as academician Anatoly Ivanovich Abrikosov.

The doctoral student was forced to abandon full-time medical studies and begin work on a program to administrate tuberculosis specialists in the Zubrilovo village in Tamalinsky District of the Penza region. After working for two years, he was elected a deputy of the Soviet Council of District. In 1956 he became head of the Klin City healthcare department and chief doctor of the Klin Tuberculosis Dispensary, which operated under the Moscow regional tuberculosis hospital. Igor Ursov was awarded the title "Honorary Doctor of the RSFSR" for his work improving measures to prevent tuberculosis and significantly reduce the tuberculosis epidemic in Klin.

Since 1968, Ursov led the Novosibirsk Tuberculosis Research Institute, when the previous director, Professor Mikhail Svirezhev, was invited to work in Moscow. Professor Ursov established a scientific reporting system to be followed by each member of the Institute. Professor Ursov was transferred to the post of Novosibirsk State Medical Institute under the order of the USSR's Ministry of Health on 1 August 1980,

In 1989, Igor Ursov provided assistance in Ulaanbaatar Medical University, Mongolia. He was consequentially awarded with an honorary membership of the society physiologists of Mongolia.

The scientist died on June 20, 2002, and was buried at the Zayeltsovskoye Cemetery.

== Scientific work ==
In 1964 Ursov wrote his thesis for Candidate of Medical Sciences degree, entitled "Repeated x-ray screenings in Klin city and Klin territory of Moscow Region". In 1973 he obtained the Doctor of Medical Science, writing his thesis on the "organizational and epidemiological bases of the tuberculosis elimination." He became a professor in 1978. In 1986, he was selected as a Corresponding Member of the USSR Academy of Medical Sciences. At the academy, he worked on many projects, such as the study of the relationship of tuberculosis in humans and farm animals in Siberia, the use of intravenous bactericidal anti-tuberculosis therapy, and the use of artificial pneumothorax and pneumoperitoneum to cure tuberculosis.

Ursov is the author of more than 210 published scientific articles with 10 monographs among them. He guided and prepared thirty candidates of medicine and eight Doctors of Medical Sciences. Ursov developed the traditional Russian tuberculosis school as the head of the Tuberculosis Department of Novosibirsk Medical University. He trained the Siberian School phthisiologists, including Yuri Nikolaevich Kurunov, Vladimir Aleksandrovich Krasnov, and Tatiana Anatolievna Kolpakova. For 12 years, he worked as a member of the Scientific Committee of the International Union Against Tuberculosis and Lung Disease.
