= Velika Moštanica =

Velika Moštanica Велика Моштаница
- Suburban settlement
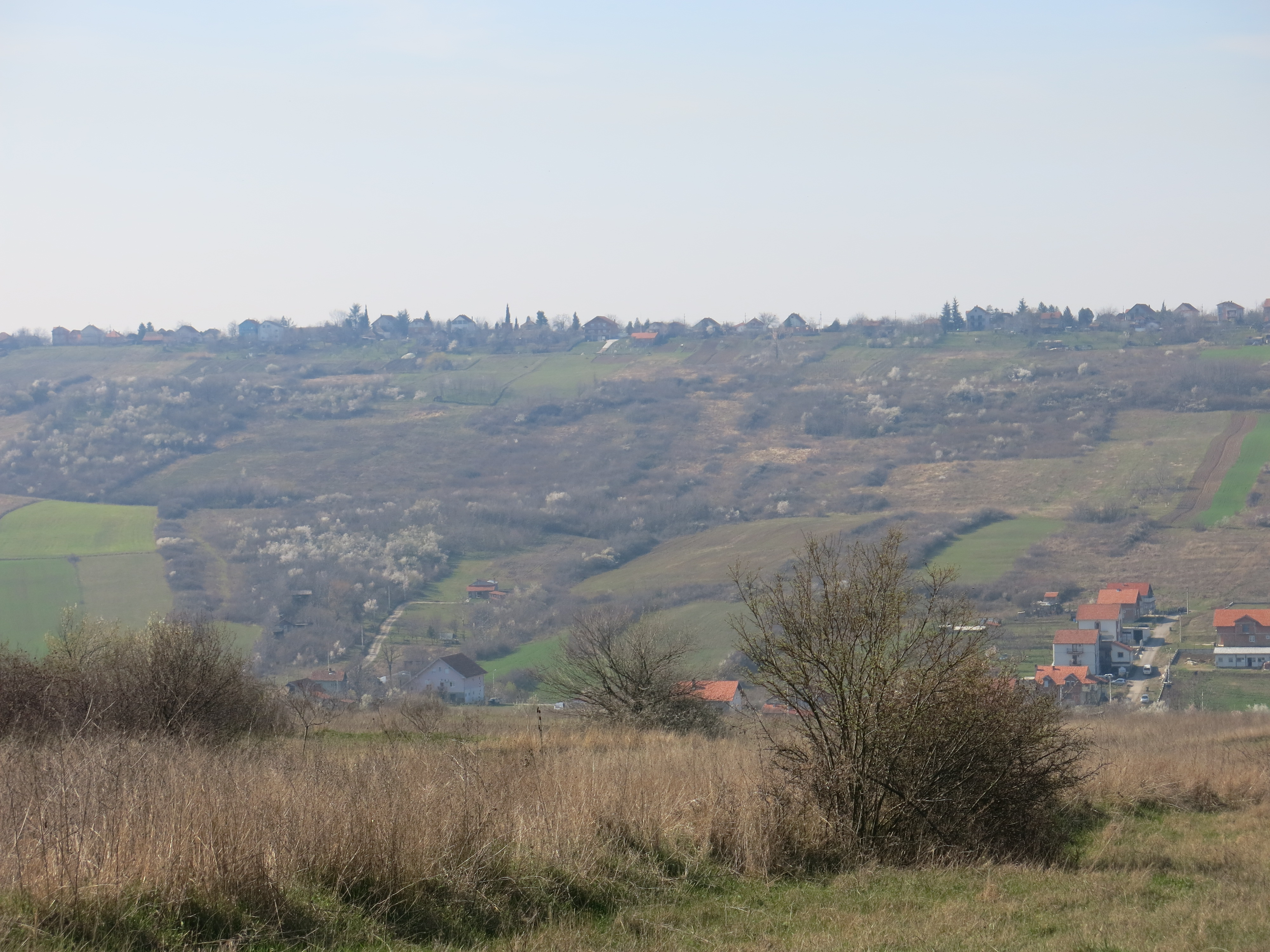

- Location within Serbia
- Coordinates: 44°40′N 20°21′E
- Country: Serbia
- Region: Belgrade
- Municipality: Čukarica

Area
  - Total: 23.63 km^{2} (9.12 sq mi)

Population (2002)
  - Total: 3,210
  - Density: 136/km^{2} (352/sq mi)
- Time zone: UTC+1 (CET)
  - Summer (DST): UTC+2 (CEST)
- Postal code: 11260
- Area code: +381(0)11
- Car plates: BG

Velika Moštanica (Serbian Cyrillic: Велика Моштаница) is a suburban settlement of Belgrade, Serbia. It is located in the municipality of Čukarica.

== Location ==
Velika Moštanica is located 22 km south-west of Belgrade, between the Belgrade-Obrenovac (5 km away) and Ibarska magistrala (4 km away) freeways. It is statistically classified as a rural settlement (village), and experiences a steady, constant growth of population:

- 1921 - 1,923
- 1971 - 2,413
- 1981 - 2,751
- 1991 - 3,084
- 2002 - 3,210

== Characteristics ==
The village has a church dedicated to the Nativity of the Blessed Virgin Mary, built in 1858. Within the churchyard is a Veteran's cemetery, where fallen in the Serbian–Ottoman Wars (1876–1878), 1885 Serbo-Bulgarian War and both Balkan and World wars are buried. The church and the cemetery are declared a cultural monument. Since 2017, an annual theatre festival "Moki Theatre" is held, dedicated to author Svetolik Ranković (1863–1899), who was born in Velika Moštanica.

The village has a kindergarten, local healthcare center, elementary school "Branko Radičević" and ethno-house "Milovuk". Nearby is the Đorićeva pond. Agriculture mostly includes orchards and cultivation of vegetables. There are preserved green corridors along the Moštanički and Stojkovački creeks.

In July 2023 city announced plans for massive urbanization of the Velika Moštanica-Pećani area, which would triple the population to 9,750.

== Sources ==
- Jovan Đ. Marković (1990): Enciklopedijski geografski leksikon Jugoslavije; Svjetlost-Sarajevo; ISBN 86-01-02651-6
