= Pećani Assembly =

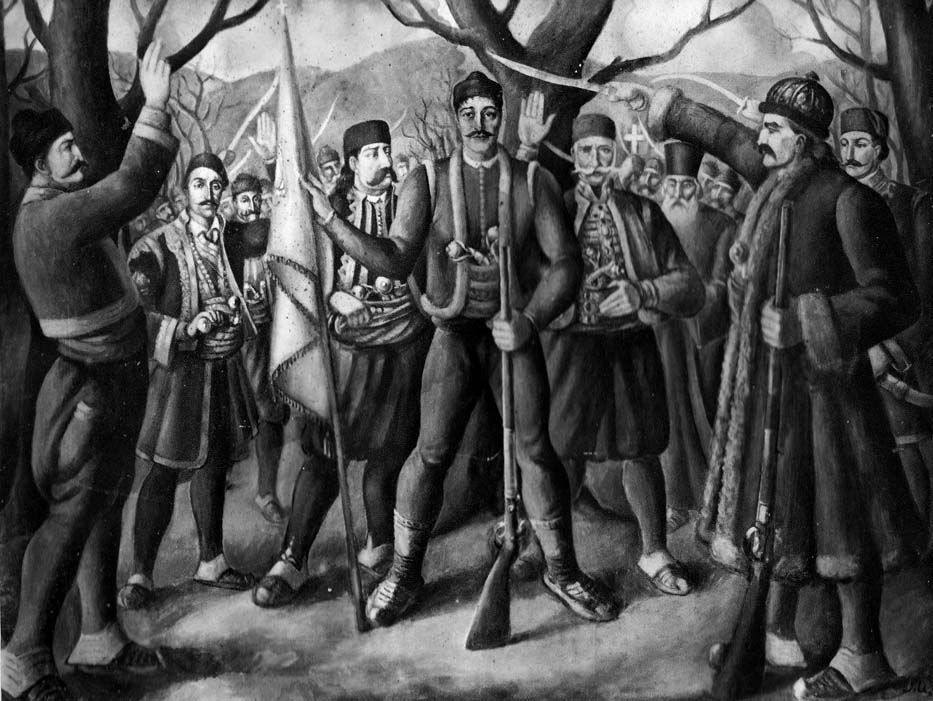
- Date: 29 April 1805
- Location: Pećani, Serbian rebel-held territory in Ottoman Empire (now Serbia)
- Theme: First Serbian Uprising
- Organised by: Serbian rebel leadership
- Participants: Nahija representatives

The Pećani Assembly (Serbian: Скупштина у Пећанима) was held by the Serbian rebel leadership on 29 April 1805 in the village of Pećani near the important rebel camp of Ostružnica outside Belgrade.

== Background ==
The Serbian rebels with Karađorđe at the head had in a relatively short time become de facto rulers of the Belgrade Pashalik, the sultan only retaining de jure rule. In mid-June 1804, a large Serbian rebel army mustered outside Belgrade, prompting the sultan to ask Karađorđe to not attack the city, as he had sent for an Ottoman Bosnian army to aid the rebels against the Dahije. The rebels aborted the assault. Vizier Bekir Pasha of Bosnia was given the mission to stop the fighting between the Dahije and Serbs, to bring peace and security to the Belgrade Pashalik and Ottoman frontier. Bekir Pasha stayed in Serbia for four months (July–October 1804), and although he and his associates received rewards and promotions, the negotiations with the Serbian rebels failed. On 3 November 1804 the Serbian delegation in St. Petersburg presented their program which included autonomy, "independent Serbian administration", with only taxes being paid to the sultan. The Serbian delegation to Russia returned in February 1805 with good news, foreign minister Czartoryski deciding to take up the Serbian cause at the Porte. Russia advised the Serbs to send a delegation to the Porte in Constantinople regarding their problems and wishes, which Russia would support.

After the failure of Bekir Pasha's mission in 1804, the Porte advised its vassals Wallachia and Moldavia to try to bring peace in the Belgrade Pashalik. The Porte tasked Wallachian ruler Constantine Ypsilantis to work on making peace with the Serbs. Two Wallachian deputies, Stapar Kalagar and Athonite archimandrite and zograph Seraphim, arrived in Serbia in April 1805 to negotiate.

== History ==
The Serbian rebel leadership held an assembly in the village of Pećani, near Ostružnica on 29 April [O.S. 17 April] 1805. The rebels chose a meadow above Pećani, surrounded by forest and firm guards, as to prevent a potential Turk attack from above the nearby caves. Ostružnica was an important rebel camp, part of the Belgrade blockade line. Karađorđe decided for an assembly on 17 April to secure more material for continued warfare; the people needed to hear the news from the St. Petersburg delegation; taxes for the forthcoming year needed to be collected.

Representatives and leaders of liberated nahiyas were present, according to Batalaka "all chiefs, all of the clergy, and all dignified among the people".

=== News from Saint Petersburg ===
The archpriest Matija Nenadović, one of the main rebel leaders and head of the delegation to the Russian Empire, gave a report on the mission to Russia. The participants met with joy the news that the Russian emperor had decided to take the Serbs under his protection and advised the Serbs to put forward demands that the sultan needed to accept for order and peace.

=== Demands and delegation to Constantinople ===
The Serb demands to the Porte, written during the assembly, included the 9 points made earlier to Bekir Pasha, with a radicalized stance. The Serbian leadership declared their wish for peace and continued loyal subjection on the following terms:

- The sultan, through any Pasha or official, expel all sipahi from Belgrade and rest of Serbia. The haraç (land tax), taxes, and all other tolls, as previously paid to the sipahi (noble cavalry), in the future be paid in a collected sum given over by the Serbian knezes without any Turk interference. The removal of the sipahi altogether would weaken the feudal relation.
- Serbia receives special administration with a supreme knez, under whom there are 12 knezes, of the 12 knežine that Serbia is now divided into; the supreme knez and nahija knezes are chosen by the Serb people, and the sultan only recognizes the titles of these, and any appointed in the future. Regarding internal autonomy, Ottoman power was considerably lessened, with the request that the Vizier be replaced with a muhasil (Porte representative), explained with that the Serbs were unable to finance the Vizier and his military- and administration apparatus; the muhasil would hold only a financial office in collecting taxes. This would strengthen self-government, with the supreme knez (vrhovni knez) and nahija knezes confirmed by berat (decree) and the supreme knez being the only intermediary between the Serbs and the sultan and responsible for taxes.
- The supreme knez (vrhovni knez, glavni srpski knez) has a permanent armed force for public safety and law and order in the land.

The freedom of independent land management, movement and trade was also demanded.

Besides the two Wallachian deputies also some Belgrade Turk representatives guested. The Wallachian deputies, unauthorized to accept any demands, said they would inform their rulers, and advised the Serbian leadership to send the demands in written form to the sultan. The Serbian leadership decided to ready a delegation to the Porte, made up of Stefan Živković, archpriest Aleksa Lazarević, and Jovan Protić, the latter to exchange Petar Čardaklija at Bucharest, Čardaklija and the first two then proceeding to Constantinople. The Ottoman Bosnian receipt of the handover of Bekir Pasha's cannons and ammunition, as a sign of devotion, was given to the delegation, as well as a register over expenses on Bekir Pasha's stay in Belgrade, the kircali (mercenaries) of Alija Gušanac, and Belgrade Vizier Suleyman Pasha, amounting to several million groschen, in token of the harsh economical burden of the Serbs.

=== Taxes and costs ===
A tax assessment for the forthcoming year was finalized, with one part to be handed over to the Belgrade Vizier and the other used for military- and other state affairs.

The costs of the uprising to date was calculated, amounting to 2,124,868 groschen or 212,486 ducats. All participants signed this report.

During the collection and counting of taxes collected by all rebel nahiyas, by the rebel leaders, as noted in Matija Nenadović's memoirs, Karađorđe uttered "... is it right that this much money be given over to the Turks, so they could beat us better, or is it better for us to use this kind of money to buy džeban (ammunition), so that we beat the Turks...!".

=== Other decisions ===
The Serbian leadership decided to expand the uprising to all of Požega–Čačak, Užice and Soko nahiyas, for the Porte to take the Serbian demands seriously. According to Batalaka, the leadership decided that judicial courts be established with the election of judges.

The merchant Teodosije Marićević, who had been suggested at the Orašac Assembly (14 February) to lead the uprising but declined as he thought rebellion would be unsuccessful, ending with Karađorđe being chosen to lead instead, started a fight by openly demanding Karađorđe to give over the supreme leadership to him. Teodosije drew his pistol to kill Karađorđe, who instead managed to shoot and kill Teodosije.

== Aftermath and legacy ==
Another petition with three points was written on 1 May 1805, with higher demands. After the rebel victory at Ivankovac against the Ottoman army, the Borak Assembly was held on 15 August 1805.

There are two epic poems in Serbianka (1826) composed by contemporary Sarajlija regarding the Teodosije–Karađorđe duel.

== See also ==
- Assemblies of the Serbian Revolution
- Timeline of the Serbian Revolution
- Serbian Army (revolutionary)

== Sources ==
- Batalaka, Lazar Arsenijević (1898). Историја српског устанка, део први [History of the Serbian Uprising: Part One]. Vol. I. Izd. Batalakinoga fonda – via Google Books.
- Batalaka, Lazar Arsenijević (1899). Историја српског устанка, део други [History of the Serbian Uprising: Part Two]. Vol. II. Izd. Batalakinoga fonda – via Google Books.
- Mitrinović, Čedomil; Brašić, Miloš (1937). Југословенске народне скупштине и сабори [Yugoslav national assemblies and councils]. Изд. Народне скупштине.
- Novaković, Stojan (1904). Устанак на дахије 1804 [Uprising against the Dahije]. Штампано у Државној штампарији – via Archive.org.
- Perović, Dušan (1976). "Osnovni ciljevi prvog ustanka". Историјски часопис. 23. Istorijski institut: 51-.
- Protić, Kosta (1893). "Ратни догађаји из првога српског устанка под Карађорђем Петровићем 1804—1813". Годишњица Николе Чупића. XIII. Državna štamparija: 114–116.
- Stojančević, Vladimir (1957). "Борбе за ослобођење Београда 1804–1806 године" (PDF). ГОДИШЊАК. IV. Музеј града Београда: 111–142.
