= Korolenko =

Korolenko (Ukrainian: Короленко) is a Ukrainian surname. The root of the word Korol means King in English. -enko is a patronymic suffix. It may refer to the following notable people:

- Caesar Korolenko, a Russian psychiatrist
- Psoy Korolenko, a pseudonym of a Russian singer
- Vladimir Korolenko, a Ukrainian/Russian writer
- Yakov Korolenko, a character played by Yakov Smirnoff in the TV show Night Court or Ulises Korolenko Mexican
