= Novosibirsk TB Research Institute =

Hospital in Russia

Novosibirsk Tuberculosis Research Institute
- Abbreviation: NTRI
- Formation: October 4, 1943
- Legal status: Federal State Budgetary Institution of the Ministry of Health of the Russian Federation
- Location: Russian Federation, 630040, Novosibirsk, Okhotskaya Street, 81 "A"
- Region served: Siberia and Far East of Russia
- Members: 305 specialists
- Director: Prof Vladimir A.Krasnov, MD, PhD
- Affiliations: Ministry of Health of the Russian Federation WHO
- Website: http://nsk-niit.ru/en

Novosibirsk Tuberculosis Research Institute (NTRI) (Russian: Новосибирский научно-исследовательский институт туберкулёза (ННИИТ- [nnʲɪˈit])) is a Federal State Budgetary Institution of the Ministry of Health of the Russian Federation and it specializes in the research and treatment of tuberculosis. NTRI provides the organization of TB care to the population in the regions of the Siberian and Far Eastern Federal Districts of Russia.

== History ==
By the Order of Soviet of People's Commissars No.19533-r from October 4, 1943 the Novosibirsk Tuberculosis Research Institute was established on the basis of equipment and personnel of the Central TB Research Institute, which was evacuated from Moscow to Novosibirsk during The Great Patriotic War, World War II, in 1941.

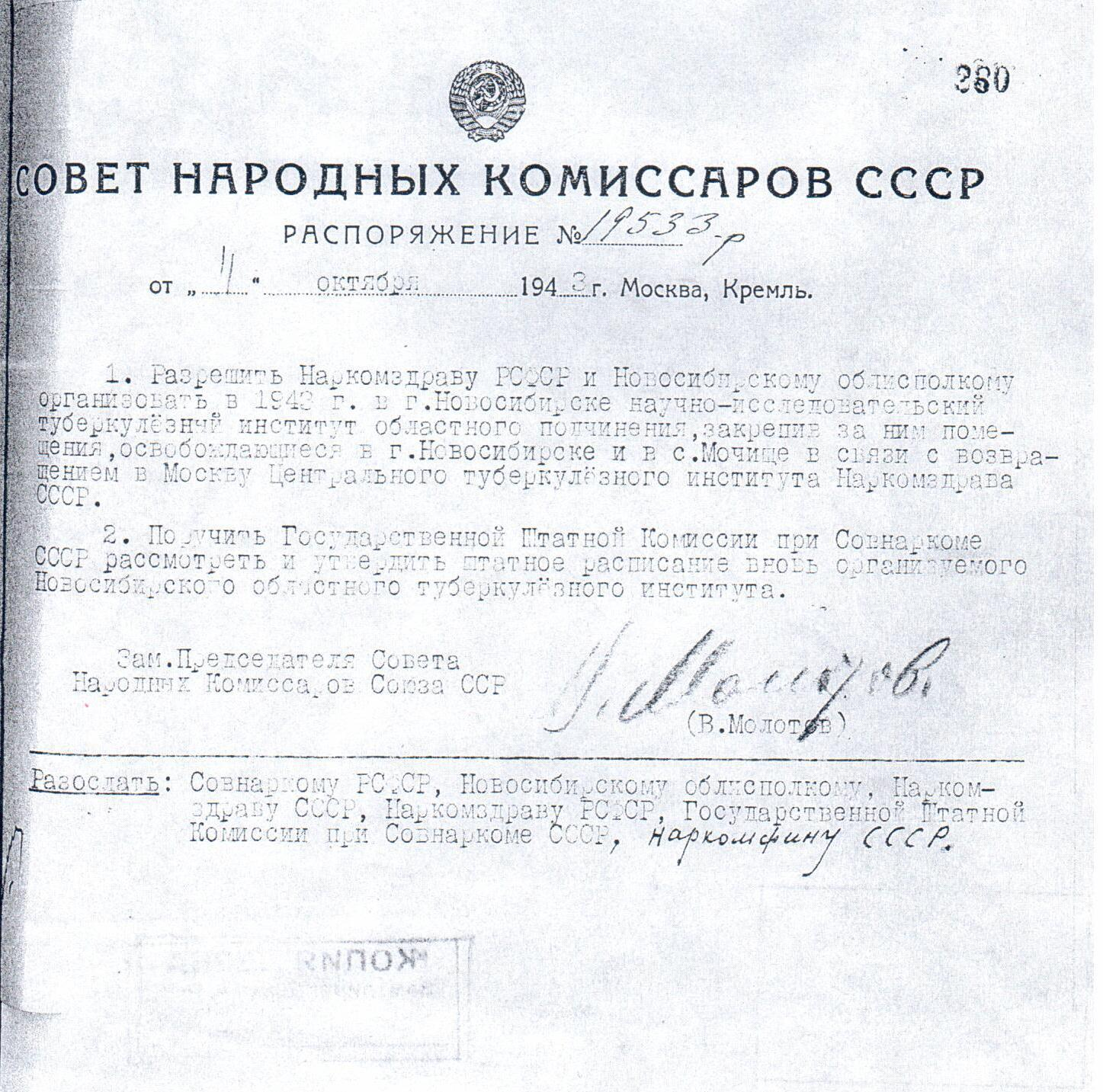
Order of the Council of People's Commissars of the USSR#19533-r 4 October 1943 (in Russian)

== Leaders ==
The first director of the Novosibirsk Scientific Research Institute of Tuberculosis was Dr Alexandra Apollonovna Letunova.

== Areas of expertise ==
NTRI provides clinical, scientific, organizational and methodological work.

Organizational and methodological: NTRI creates, supports and improves a system of effective TB control services for 21 subjects of the two federal districts of the Russian Federation:

- 10 subjects in Siberian Federal District: Altai Republic, Republic of Tuva, Republic of Khakassia, Altai krai, Krasnoyarsk Territory, Irkutsk Oblast, Kemerovo oblast, Novosibirsk oblast, Omsk oblast, Tomsk region.
- 11 subjects in Far Eastern Federal District: The Republic of Buryatia, Republic of Sakha-Yakutia, Zabaikalsky krai, Kamchatka krai, Primorsky krai, Khabarovsk krai, Amur Oblast, Magadan Oblast, Sakhalin Oblast, Jewish Autonomous Region, Chukotka Autonomous Okrug.

NTRI provides MoH RF with epidemiological data and data analysis and forecasting.

Science: NTRI conducts preclinical, clinical trials of drugs and medical devices according to international standards, the Institution is providing with experimental design and analysis of specialized scientific publications and developed medical software products.

Clinic: NTRI as a tertiary level health care facility carries out all types of diagnostics and treatment of tuberculosis, including the provision of high-technological and specialized medical care for patients from the Siberian and Far Eastern Federal Districts of the Russian Federation. In the Institute, osteoplastic thoracoplasty (a variant of extrapleural thoracoplasty) has been used and improved for the last 50 years for patients with complicated cavitary forms of TB for whom lung resection is contraindicated.

Since 2010 the NTRI is the Collaborating Centre of the World Health Organization (RUS-123).

NTRI TB Bacteriological laboratory of NTRI is a Centre of Excellence (NCE-CRL) Supranational Reference Laboratories Network WHO (SRLN)
