= Ihar Tsaplyuk =

Belarusian footballer

Personal information
- Full name: Ihar Yuryevich Tsaplyuk
- Date of birth: 15 July 1970 (age 56)
- Height: 1.84 m (6 ft 1/2 in)
- Position: Defender

Youth career
- Dnipro Dnipropetrovsk

Senior career*
Years	Team	Apps	(Gls)
1991	Vulkan Petropavlovsk-Kamchatsky	19	(0)
1991	Lokomotiv Ussuriysk	5	(0)
1992–1993	Stroitel Starye Dorogi	41	(2)
1993	KAMAZ Naberezhnye Chelny	3	(0)
1993	→ KAMAZ-d Naberezhnye Chelny	14	(0)
1994–1999	Neftekhimik Nizhnekamsk	189	(2)
2000	Luninets	12	(1)
2000	Granit Mikashevichi	15	(1)
2001–2003	Torpedo Zhodino	56	(2)
- * Club domestic league appearances and goals

Ihar Yuryevich Tsaplyuk (Belarusian: Ігар Юр'евіч Цаплюк; Russian: Игорь Юрьевич Цаплюк, Igor Yuryevich Tsaplyuk; born 15 July 1970) is a former Belarusian football player.

Between 2004 and 2010 he worked at Torpedo Zhodino as director and sports director. Since 2012, he is working at Football Federation of Belarus.
