= Pećani =

Пећани Pećani
- Town
- Location within Serbia
- Coordinates: 44°42′N 20°20′E
- Country: Serbia
- District: Belgrade District
- Municipality: Čukarica

Area
  - Total: 4.62 km^{2} (1.78 sq mi)

Population (2011)
  - Total: 562

Pećani (Serbian Cyrillic: Пећани) is an urban settlement of Belgrade, the capital of Serbia. It is located in the municipality of Čukarica.

Pećani is located 3 km south of Ostružnica, in central part of the Čukarica municipality. It is the second least populated settlement in the municipality, with a population of 562 as of 2011 census, and despite being small and depopulating (population of 632 in 1991), it is statistically classified as an urban settlement (town).

There are two karstic caves near the town, called Donja Pećina and Gornja Pećina ("upper cave" and "lower cave").

In July 2023 city announced plans for massive urbanization of the Velika Moštanica-Pećani area, which would triple their combined population to 9,750.
