= Jasenica (Valjevo) =

Jasenica Јасеница
- Village
- Location within Serbia
- Coordinates: 44°19′N 19°57′E
- Country: Serbia
- District: Kolubara District
- Municipality: Valjevo

Population (2002)
  - Total: 427
- Time zone: UTC+1 (CET)
  - Summer (DST): UTC+2 (CEST)

Jasenica is a village in the municipality of Valjevo, Serbia. According to the 2002 census, the village has a population of 427 people.

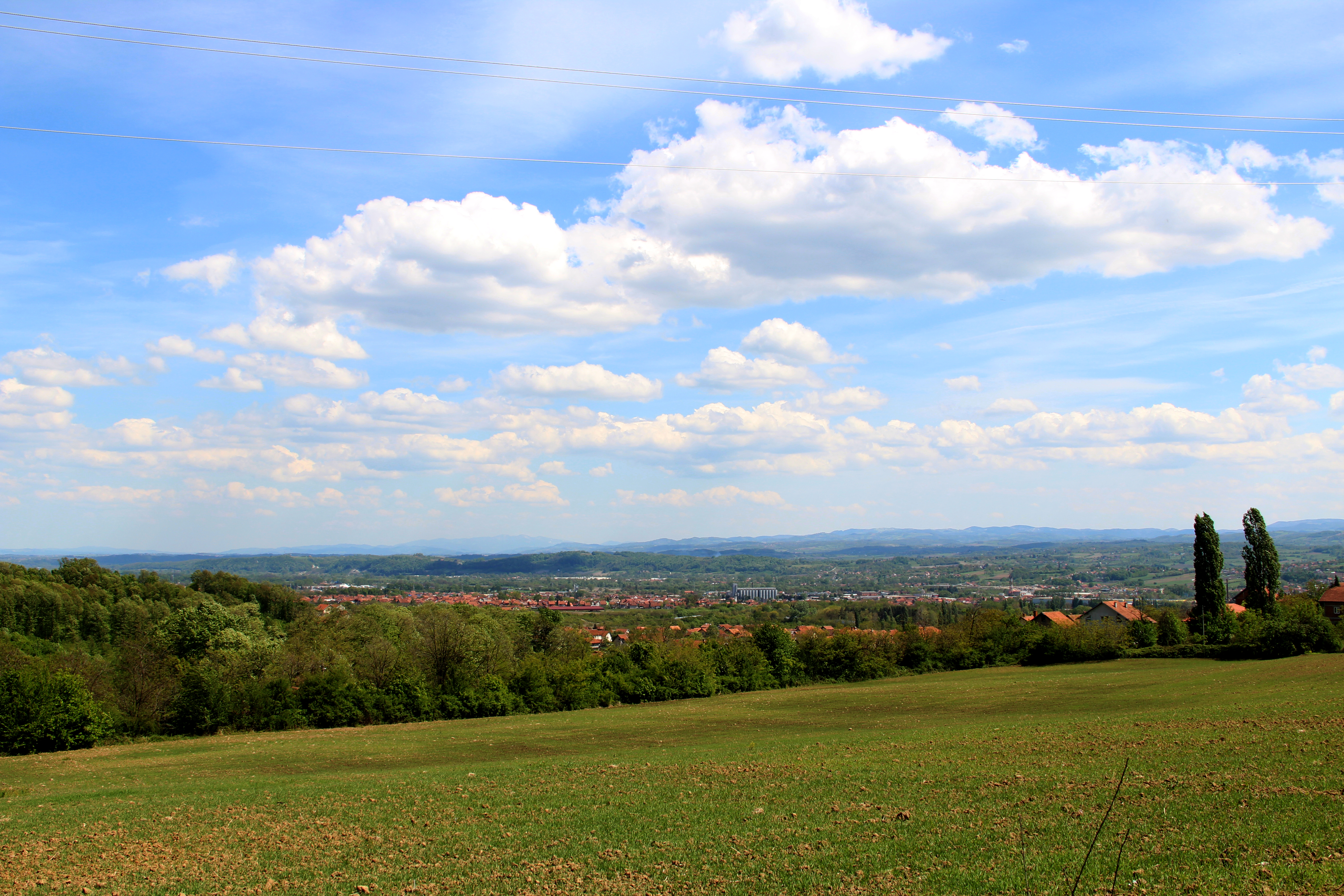
village Jasenica - panorama

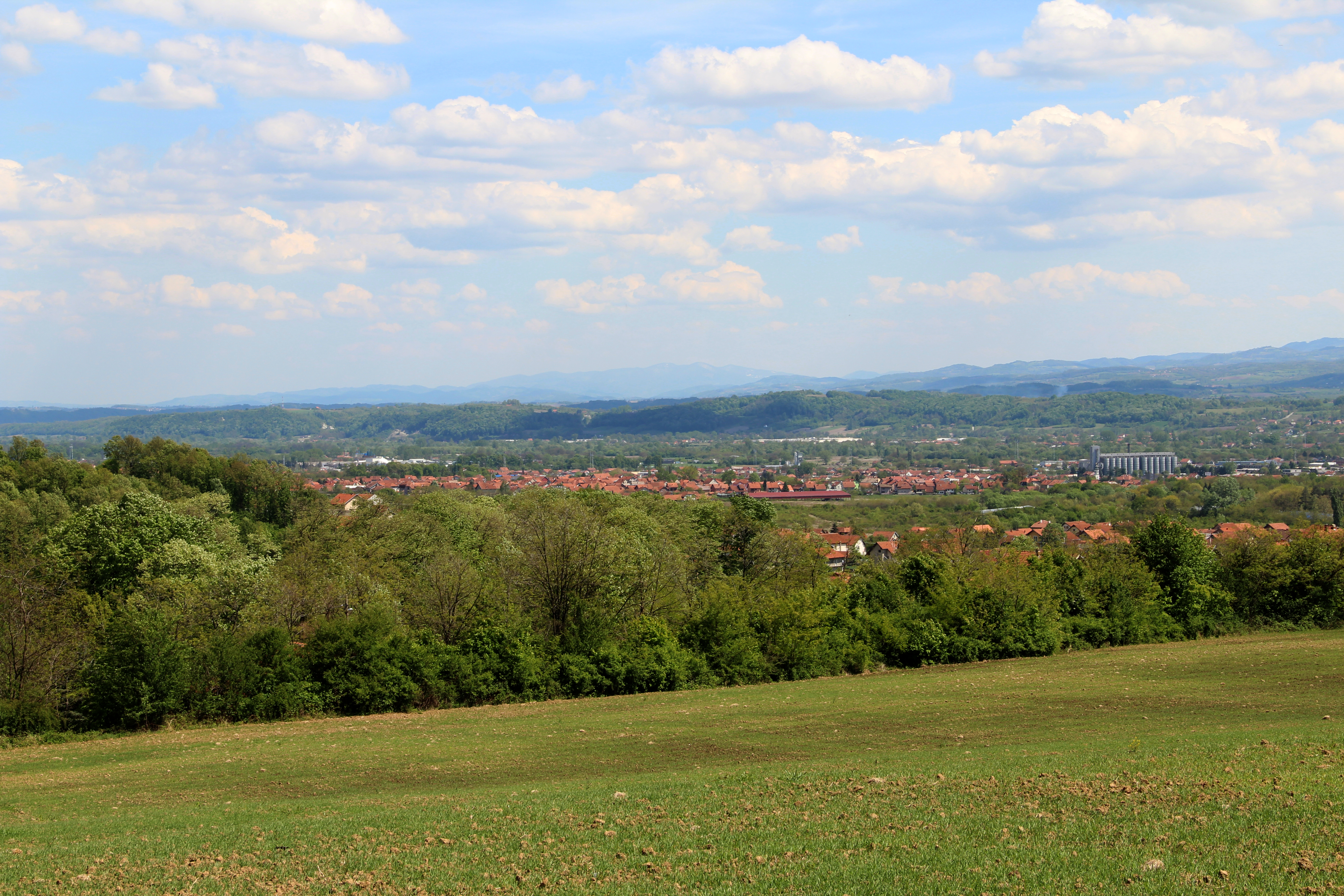
village Jasenica - panorama

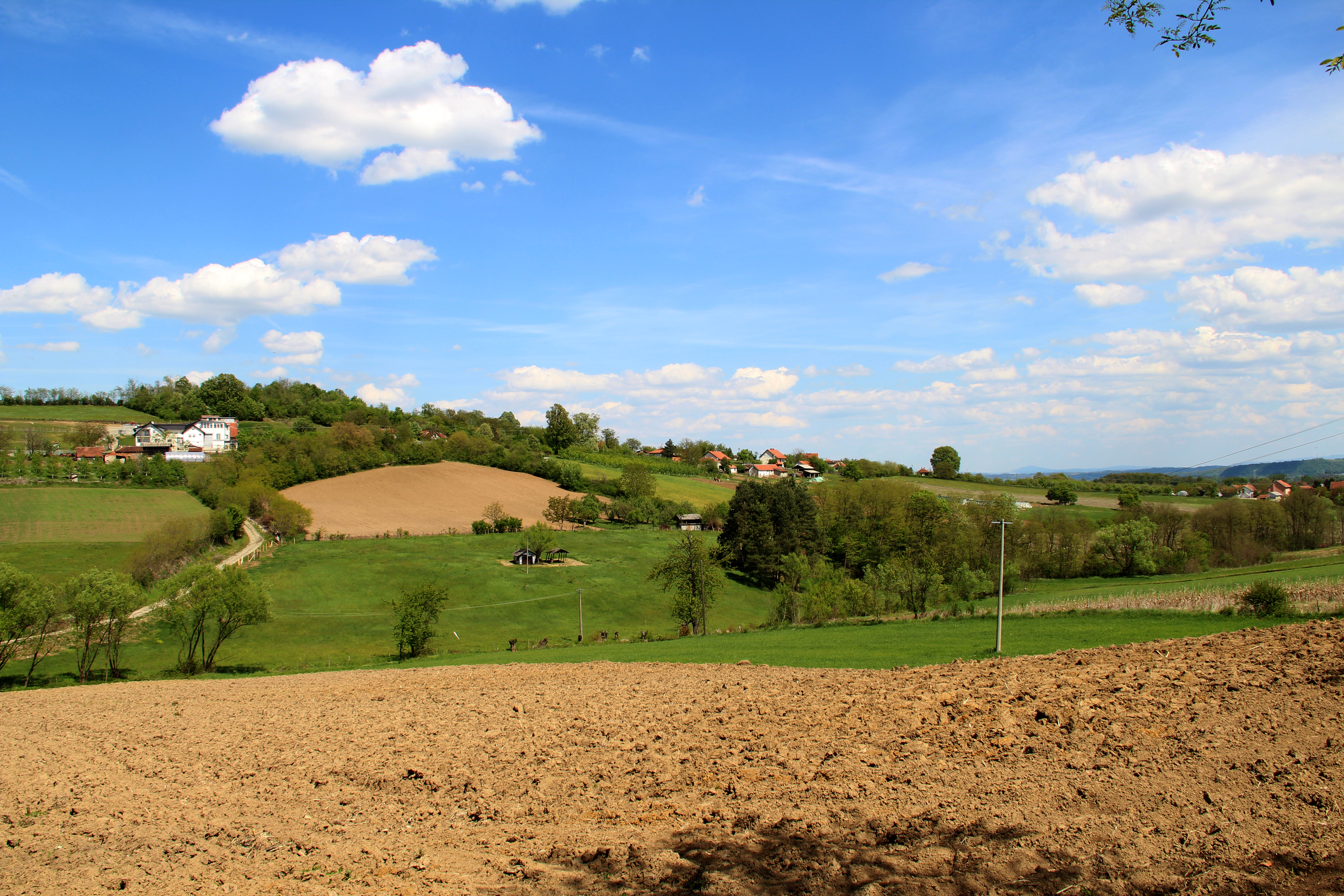
village Jasenica - panorama

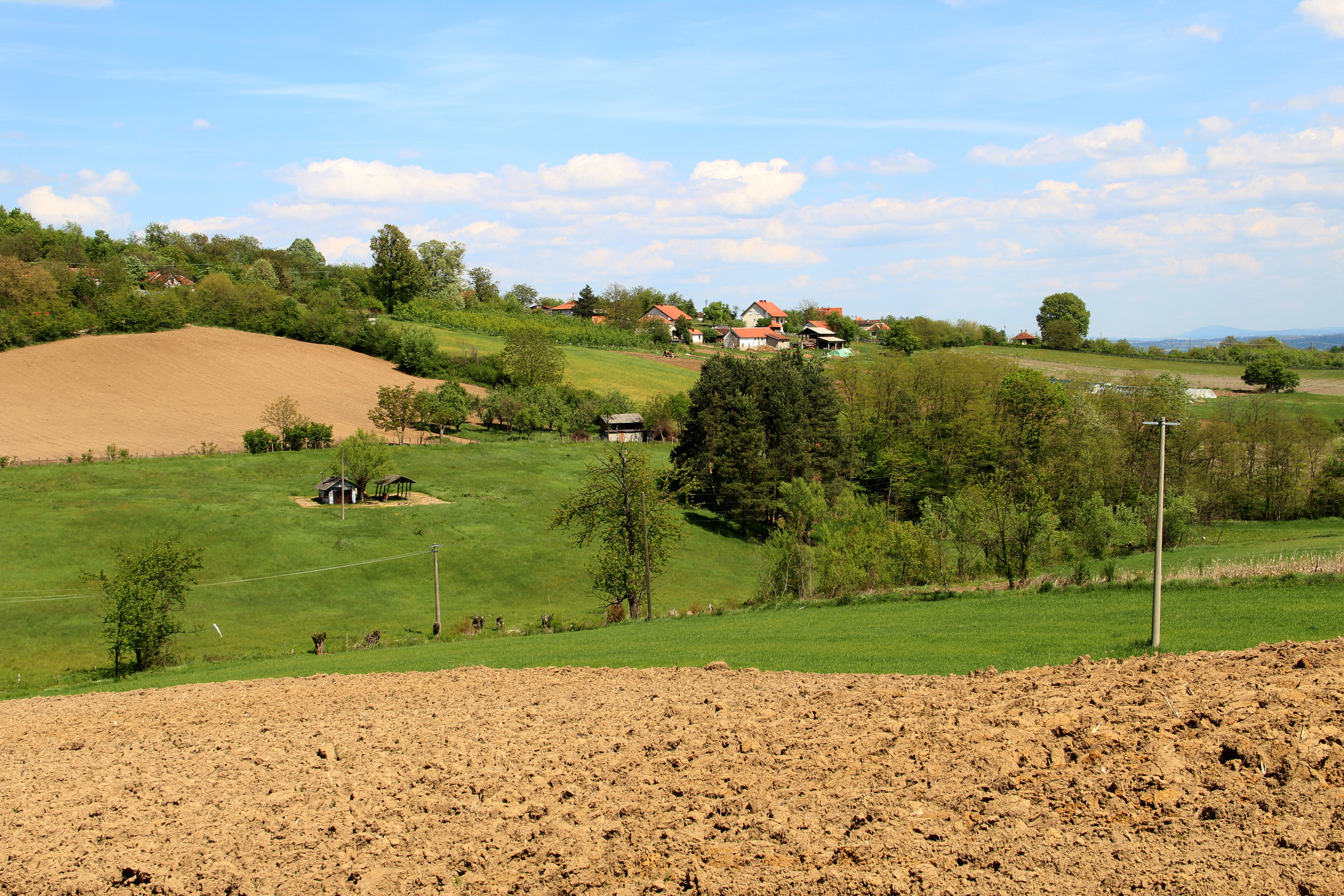
village Jasenica - panorama

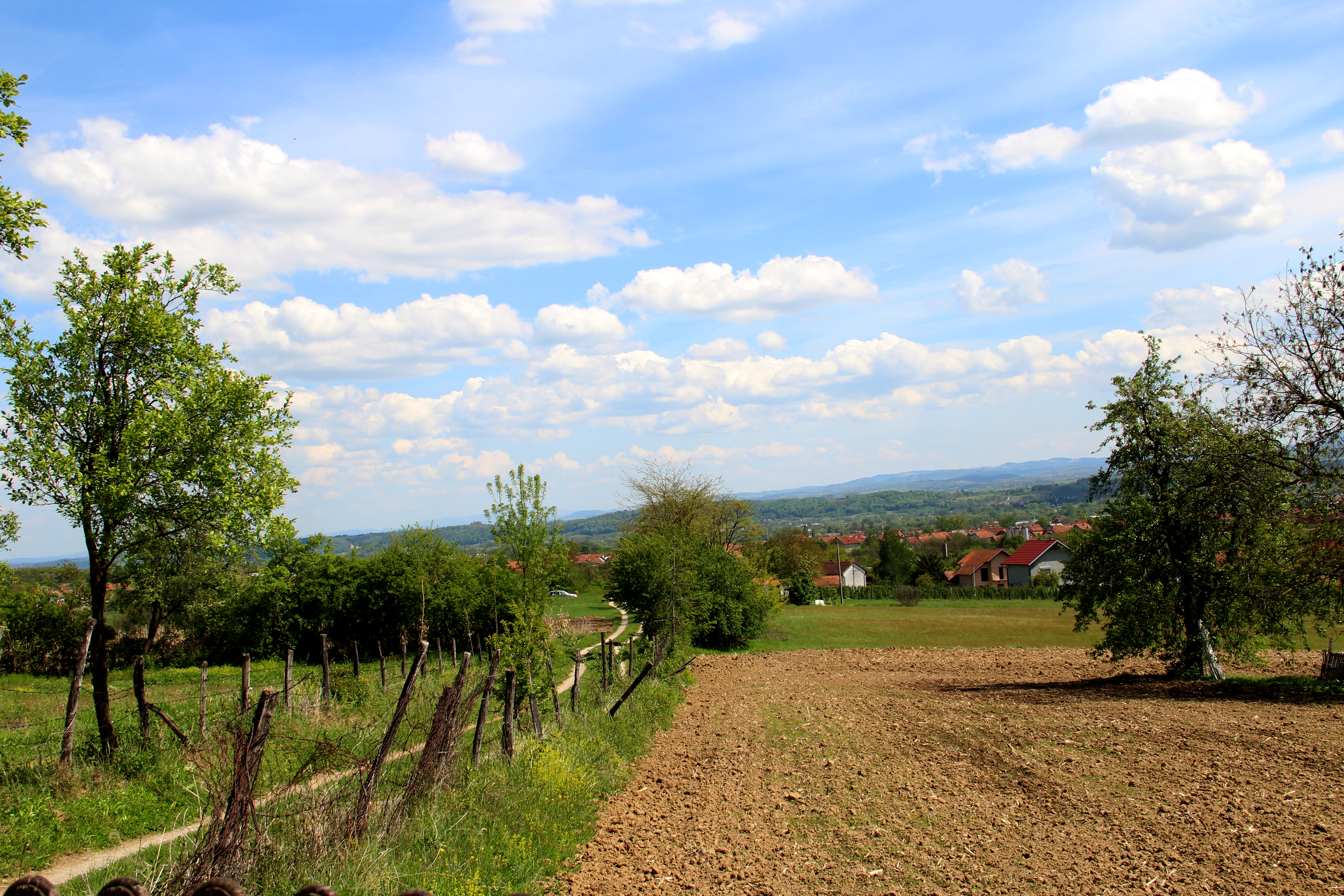
village Jasenica - panorama
