= Ihar Rynkevich =

Belarusian politician (born 1968)

- Ігар Міхайлавіч Рынкевіч
- Born: 3 April 1968 (age 58)
- Education: Grodno State University
- Occupations: Legal expert, journalist, human rights activist
- Years active: 1996–present
- Organization: Belarus Helsinki Committee
- Known for: Defense of Alaksandar Kazulin; advocacy for Emanuel Zeltser and Vladlena Funk
- Title: Vice Chairman of the Social Democratic Party of Popular Accord
- Political party: Social Democratic Party of Popular Accord

Ihar Mikhaylavich Rynkevich (Belarusian: І́гар Міха́йлавіч Рынке́віч; born 3 April 1968) is a prominent Belarusian legal and political expert, journalist and human rights champion. Rynkevich is a member and the press secretary of the Belarus Helsinki Commission since 1996 and Vice Chairman of the Social Democratic Party of Popular Accord.

== Important Cases ==
Rynkevich is best known for his role as lead defence counsel for Alaksandar Kazulin, former Chairman of BSDP and one of the most prominent Eastern-European human rights activist, and for advocating the release of American lawyer Emanuel Zeltser and his assistant Vladlena Funk during the U.S. - Belarus hostage crisis in 2008-2009. In an interview, Rynkevich, described Mr. Zeltser and Ms. Funk as "political prisoners" and noted that it was the "lack of evidence" against Mr. Zeltser and Ms. Funk that prompted the country’s authorities to hold the hearing behind closed doors. Rynkevich noted that "violence" had been used against the accused in custody in breach of international treaties signed by Belarus. "This is yet another shameful case for the Belarusian judiciary for which more than one generation of Belarusian legal experts will blush" said Rynkevich. "Belarus cannot have any grounds for holding them here except for the protection of someone else's interests" he added.

The pressure on Rynkevich was so intense that he was forced to quit the bar in 2007. He continued to work in the interests of Kazulin as a member of public commission ‘Freedom for Kazulin’. He suffered a concussion from policemen on March 2, 2006, when Kazulin tried to visit the All Belarusian People's Assembly. Rynkevich also received death threats.

Rynkevich worked closely with the United States Department of State, the members of the US Congress, the Organization for Security and Co-operation in Europe and other world democratic organization in the successful international campaign to free Kozulin. Yielding to intense international pressure, Belarusian dictator Lukashenka granted Kozulin presidential pardon in August 2008.

== Education ==
In 1992 Rynkevich graduated from Grodno State University (Belarus) cum laude majoring in history. In 1998, he graduated cum laude from Grodno State University Law School. Member of Minsk Bar since 1999.

== Public life ==
Since 1989 Rynkevich has been actively working as a human rights defender.

Rynkevich commenced his affiliation with the BSDP in 1991 as the Chairman of the BSDP Central Oversight Commission. In 1992 he was elected member of the Central Council and Executive Committee of BSDP, and in 1995 became the BSDP press-secretary and lead election counsel. In 1995 Rynkevich co-founded Belarusian Social Democratic Union and engineered the amalgamation of the BSDP with the Party of the People’s Consent (PPC).

In 1995 Rynkevich was one of the founders of the Belarusian Association of Journalists and its legal department. In 1996 he became one of the members of the Belarus Helsinki Commission.

Rynkevich served as the vice-president of the Belarusian Media Legal Defence Centre (BMLD) in 1997-1998.

In 2001-2004 he worked closely with the Belarusian Citizens’ Legal Defence Centre, a prominent human rights organization. Rynkevich is one of the principal organizers of the citizens’ campaign "Belarus for the European Council" (BEC).

In 2007, Rynkevich founded Belarusian Public Commission for Rehabilitation of the Victims of Political Repressions (PCRVPR).

Academics and Publications. From 1998 to 2006, Rynkevich taught as Associate Professor in the College of Management and Entrepreneurship in Minsk. Rynkevich authored numerous publications on the issues of legal framework of mass media, criminal procedure and legal defence, and juridical-political articles.

In 2016 he attended the Russian Bolotnaya Square case as an independent observer and consulted the defence.
