= Vladlena Funk =

Russian-American freelance reporter (born 1977)

Vladlena Funk (Russian: Владлена Функ; born 1977) is a former Russian-American freelance reporter, who was held captive by the Belarusian KGB for over a year in a high-profile US-Belarus hostage crisis, together with American lawyer Emanuel Zeltser, who was head of the American Russian Law Institute, a non-for-profit non-governmental public policy research and advisory organization.

== Early life and career ==
Ms. Funk was born and raised in Veliky Novgorod, Russia. After earning bachelor’s and master's degrees in Linguistics from the Yaroslav-the-Wise Novgorod State University, she joined web-based Moscow Telegraph. She subsequently earned an MBA in Economics from Moscow State University. Beginning in 2004, she worked for New York based WSNR Radio (620 AM) as its Moscow correspondent.

== Abduction ==
On March 11, 2008, Zeltser and Funk were abducted in London, U.K., by the Belarusian KGB operatives. Both were drugged and secretly rendered across international borders to Belarus aboard a private jet belonging to Boris Berezovsky, a notorious Russian "oligarch" and close friend of the Belarusian president Alyaksandar Lukashenka. Berezovsky was wanted by the Interpol for fraud, money laundering, participation in organized crime and transnational financial crimes. Berezovsky had been widely reported to be the man behind many high-profile murders, including brutal killings of US reporter Paul Khlebnikov; prominent Russian journalists Vladislav Listyev and Anna Politkovskaya; Deputy Head of Russian Central Bank Andrey Kozlov; and a former Russian intelligence officer Alexander Litvinenko (poisoned with a nuclear substance Polonium-210 in London).

=== Detention in Belarus ===
Upon landing in Minsk, Belarus, Zeltser and Funk were detained by the personal guard of Lukashenka, the Belarusian president, whose election was not considered free and fair by the U.S. Department of State. Zeltser and Funk were transported to Amerikanka, the Belarusian dreaded KGB detention facility of the Stalin era. There both were repeatedly tortured, denied critical medications, and told that they would remain in captivity indefinitely unless the United States lifted sanctions against Lukashenka and Belneftekhim. Zeltser and Funk were held hostage by the Belarusian KGB for 473 days and 373 days respectively.

=== Unlawful seizure ===
Neither Funk nor Zeltser had been lawfully "arrested," "charged" "indicted," "tried" or "convicted" within the meaning of Belarusian or international law. Both had been unlawfully seized and held hostage – in blatant violation of the laws of nations and of Belarus' own law. During their unlawful confinement, Funk and Zeltser had been subjected to torture and cruel, inhuman or undignified treatment in blatant violation of the Article 25 of the Belarus Constitution; the U.S. law and numerous international treaties, including the International Convention Against the Taking of Hostages (The Hostage Convention); the United Nations Convention Against Torture, International Covenant on Civil and Political Rights the law of nations and universally accepted norms of the international law of human rights.

=== International reaction ===
Zeltser's and Funk's seizure, torture and unlawful detention sparked international outrage and significant press coverage, apparently unexpected by the Belarusian authorities. The U.S. Department of State and members of the U.S. Congress repeatedly demanded the release of the hostages. World leaders, the European Parliament and international human rights organizations joined in the U.S. call for immediate release of Funk and Zeltser. Amnesty International repeatedly issued emergency alerts respecting "torture and other ill-treatment" of Zeltser. Ihar Rynkevich, a prominent Belarusian legal expert and Press Secretary of the Belarus Helsinki Commission said in an interview: "This is yet another shameful case for the Belarusian judiciary for which more than one generation of Belarusian legal experts will blush."

=== Political motivation ===
It was widely believed that Zeltser's and Funk's abduction, detention and mistreatment in KGB captivity was undertaken to coerce the United States to lift sanctions against Lukashenka and other members of the Belarusian government, and against Belarusian petrochemical concern Belneftekhim, owned by these individuals. As such, Belarus's actions were gross violations of the law of nations and universally accepted norms of the international law of human rights, including laws prohibiting hostage taking and state-sponsored terrorism. A strongly worded letter from the New York City Bar Association to Lukashenko condemned KGB abuse of Zeltser and Funk and demanded their immediate release. The Bar Association letter expressed "great concerned about the arrests and detention of Mr. Zeltser and Ms. Funk and the reports of physical mistreatment of Mr. Zeltser" and noted that this conduct is inconsistent with Belarus' obligations under international agreements, including the International Covenant on Civil and Political Rights (ICCPR) and the Convention Against Torture and Other Inhuman or Degrading Treatment or Punishment (CAT). Bar Association letter noted that the charge which the KGB claimed to have brought against Zeltser and Funk "appears to have no basis to it", lacked "any explanation or detail" and "concerns have thus been reported that this is a fabricated charge, created to justify their unlawful detention."

=== Release ===
Yielding to demands of international community, Belarusian dictator Lukashenka had finally released Funk on March 20, 2009, and Zeltser on June 30, 2009, when a delegation of the members of the U.S. Congress traveled to Belarus to meet with Lukashenka regarding the hostage crisis. U.S. Chargé d'Affaires in Belarus Jonathan M. Moore commented: "At no time have the Belarusian authorities ever provided any indication that the charges against Mr. Zeltser and Ms. Funk were legitimate. As a result, I can only conclude that the charges in this case are thoroughly without merit; and are the result of extra-legal motivation." Patton Boggs, a prominent Washington D.C. human rights law firm coordinated international efforts for Funk's and Zeltser's release.

During her first U.S. interview after being freed, Funk told reporters: "I was held hostage for over a year and rescued thanks to incredible efforts of the US Diplomats, and members of the US Congress. God bless America!"

== United States position ==
The U.S. Department of State denied making any concessions to Lukashenka, and repeatedly said that it does not use its citizens as "bargaining chips". However, many in Belarus still believe that U.S. cut a deal with Lukashenka, inducing him to release hostages in exchange for IMF credits to Belarus. Appearing on Russian TV network NTV, Anatoly Lebedko, Chairman of the Belarusian United Popular Party said: "Washington was forced to pay ransom for its citizen by providing Lukashenka the IMF credits, pure and simple; in essence, this is hostage-taking, the practice, which is wide-spread in Belarus elevated to the new level, where Lukashenka is not only sending a political message but demands monetary compensation for human freedom."

== See also ==
- Human rights in Belarus
