= Ihor Kyrylenko =

Ihor Kyrylenko Кириленко Ігор Геннадійович
- Born: 23 May 1991 (age 35); Kerch, Ukraine
- Origin: Ukraine
- Genres: Electronic; Futurepop; Bass
- Occupations: Producer, composer, musician
- Years active: 2008–present
- Labels: Universal Music Group, Hospital Records

Ihor Hennadiyovych Kyrylenko (Ukrainian: Ігор Геннадійович Кириленко, born 23 May 1991, Kerch, USSR) is a Ukrainian musician, songwriter, producer and founding member of The Erised, Liquid Break, co-founder of Hidden Element and a DJ in LOBODA band.

== Life and work ==
Ihor Kyrylenko was born on 23 May in Kerch in the family of engineers, Tetyana Olexandrivna and Gennadiy Olexandrovych Kyrylenko. Ihor was interested in sport since his childhood, practiced boxing, participated in the regional sport competitions and placed high. Ihor became interested in music when he was 13 and tried to play guitar for the first time. He began to explore the application for music making and made the first attempts to write his own music.

In 2008 he graduated from Kerch general academic school specializing in English. In 2013 Ihor graduated from Kharkiv National Academy of Culture in speciality "stage director of variety art and public shows". He took a master's degree.

During 10 years after the start of his artistic career Ihor wrote and released more than 300 tracks in futurepop, drum-and-bass and electronic style under the world-famous labels, such as Hospital Records, Absys Limited, Alphacut. The musician collaborated with many Ukrainian singers and bands: The Erised and Liquid Break and became co-founder of electronic band Hidden Element.

== Bands ==
In 2009 he founded the live electronic band Liquid Break. In 2011, together with musician Nil Tarasov founded the electronic band Hidden Element. In 2013, founded The Erised. Since 2014 works as a musician and DJ in the band of Ukrainian singer Svetlana Loboda.

=== The Erised ===
In 2014, Ihor founded The Erised band. Initially, it included three musicians – Ihor Kyrylenko, Daniil Marin and Nil Tarasov. Each of them had their own experience in music writing and some achievements in the musical industry by that time. Soon, the bass guitarist Vladimir Mykhayliuk, the drummer Olexander Liuliakin and the vocalist Sonya Sukhorukova joined the band. In February 2015 they released their first song called “Pray”. The song became their first visit card and is featuring in total more than 1 million of streams as of today. In 2015, owing to the efforts of Ihor Kyrylenko and Nil Tarasov the band has signed the cooperation agreement with the British label Med School Music (the division of Hospital Records).

=== Hidden Element ===
The electronic band Hidden Element, was founded in 2011 and is still active. The band is composed of two musicians – Ihor Kyrylenko and Nil Tarasov. The band's songs were released under the labels in Germany, Great Britain and USA.

== Discography ==
=== With Liquid Break ===
==== EP ====
- Liquid Break (2012, Ultra Vague Recordings)
- Remixes (2012, Self Released)

==== Singles ====
- Love (with Derrick Buma) (2012, Self Released)
- I See The Light (with Kiyomi Yamashita) (2013, Burelom)

=== With Hidden Element ===
==== EP ====
- Midas (2012, Bass Me Records)
- No Coincidences (2012, Clear Conceptions)
- Signs Of Hope (2012, Break-Fast Audio)
- POP MUSIQ (2013, Pinecone Moonshine)
- Lifeforms (2013, Translation Recordings)
- Other Forms (2015, Translation Recordings)
- Lost Variations (2015, Self Released)

==== LP ====
- Together (2016, Absys Limited)

==== Singles ====
- Don't Want To See You Ever Again (2013, Monoclock Music)
- Nr. 13 (2013, 22:22)
- Twilight (2013, Absys Records)
- How Can I Trust You (2014, Audio Plants)
- Unfurl Dissonance (2014, Med School)
- Bodola (2015, Hospital)
- Reload, Replay (2015, Alphacut)
- Edge Off (2015, Silent Season)
- Thousand Kisses Place (2016, Alphacut)

==== Remixes ====
- Pavel Dovgal – I Tried (Hidden Element Remix) (2013, Monoclock Music)
- K-Chaos – Visible (Hidden Element Remix) (2017, Pinecone Moonshine)
- London Electricity – Parallax (Hidden Element Remix) (2016, Med School Music)

=== With The Erised ===
==== EP ====
- Desire (2015, Med School)
- Live (2016, Med School)

==== LP ====
- Room 414 (2016, Med School)

==== Singles ====
- In My Car (2015, Med School)
- Let Me Be (2017, Med School)
- Run (2017, Hitwonder)

=== Cooperation with other artists ===
- Jamala — Drifting Apart (with The Erised) (2016, Universal Music Group)
- Enter Shikari — Interlude (The Erised Remix) (2015, PIAS)
- London Elektricity — Parallax (Hidden Element Remix) (2016, Med School)
- Pavel Dovgal — I Tried (Hidden Element Remix) (2013, Monoclock Music)
- K-Chaos — Visible (Hidden Element Remix) (2017, Pinecone Moonshine)
- LOBODA – since 2014 as a musician, DJ and an arranger.
