= Igor Jankowski =

Polish-Belarusian composer, teacher and music activist

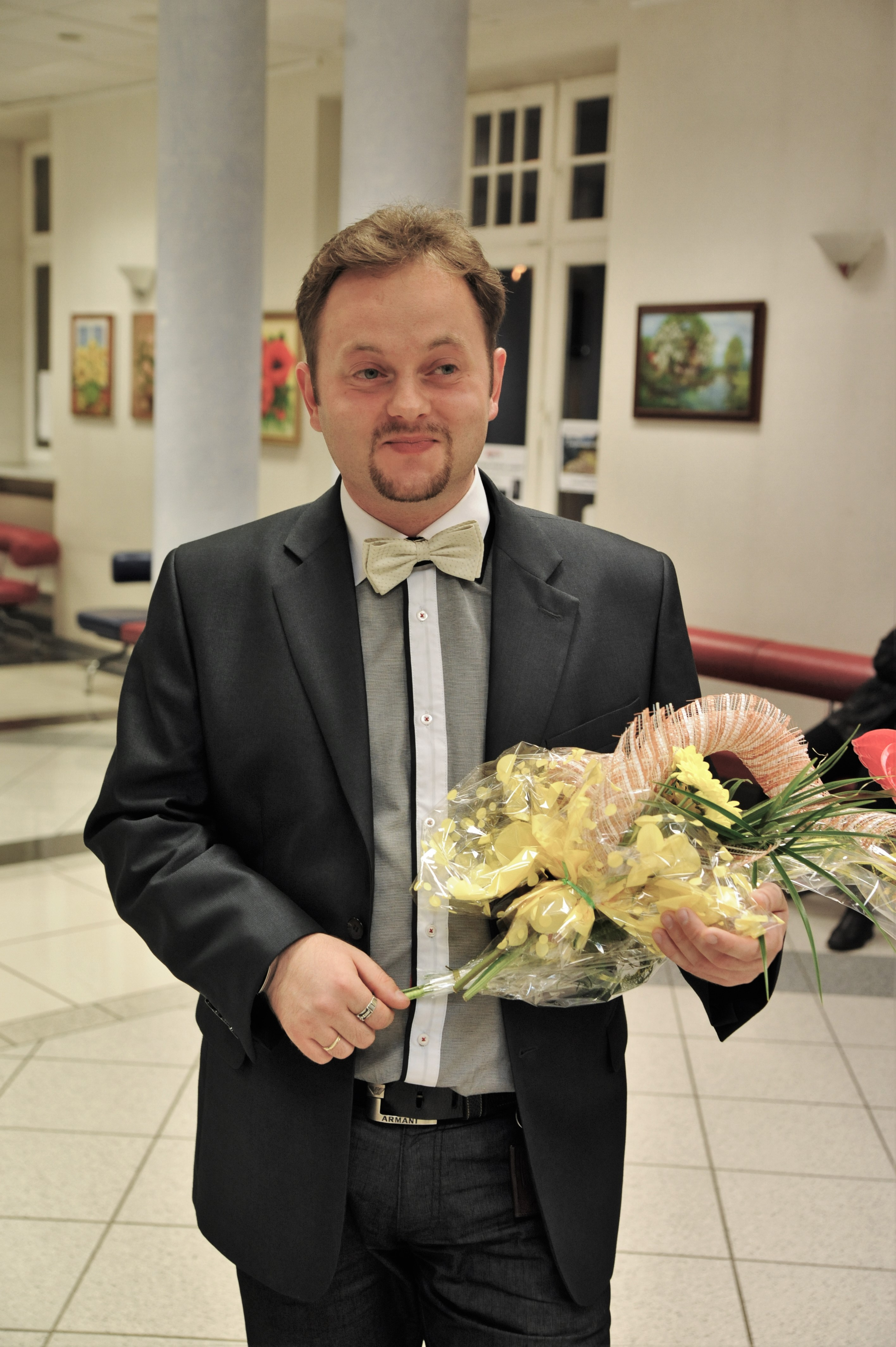

Background information
- Born: 23 November 1983 (age 41)
- Origin: Minsk, Belarus
- Genres: Classical music
- Occupation(s): Composer, teacher and music manager
- Instrument(s): piano, accordion

Igor Jankowski (born November 23, 1983, in Minsk, Belarus) – Polish-Belarusian composer, teacher and music activist.

== Biography ==
He studied composition with Dmitry Smolski at the Belarusian State Academy of Music in Minsk (BA, 2006–2009) by Marek Jasiński and Marian Borkowski at the Academy of Music in Bydgoszcz (MA, 2009–2011). Then under the supervision of Marian Borkowski at the Fryderyk Chopin University of Music in Warsaw (doctorate, 2011–2014). He also studied conducting in the class of Włodzimierz Czernikow and playing the accordion by Nikolai Bujanov at the National Music College named after M. Glinka in Minsk (1999-2003).

He is also the founder and artistic director of the Belarusian Culture Festival in Pomerania and from January 18, 2016, he is the president of the Foundation for Artistic Development and International Cooperation MSM UNICUM. In December 2018, the SOLITON publishing house in Sopot released Igor Jankowski's album QVO VADIS, containing 11 songs.

== Musicianship and influence ==
Almost all of the pieces Igor wrote were performed in public in various cities of Eastern and Western Europe (over 150 performances). He describes his musical language as neotonic. Igor Jankowski owes an important role in shaping his creative personality to his three professors: Dmitry Smolski, Marek Jasiński and Marian Borkowski. In 2011, Jankowski's first album, A New Size Of Old Traditions, was released by the Belarusian music publisher VIGMA, and in November 2012 he became a member of the Polish Composers' Union (Warsaw Department).

== Main compositions ==
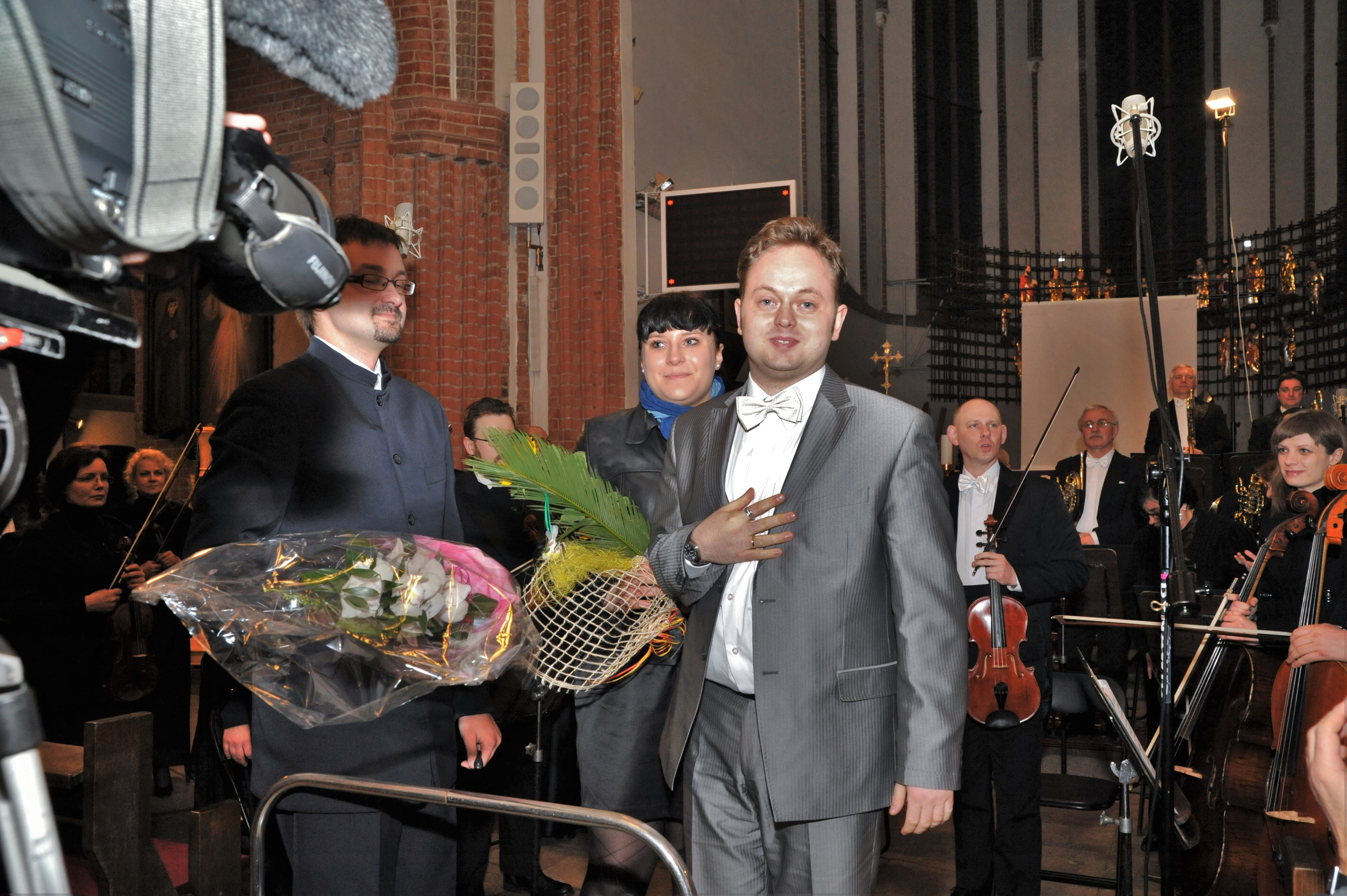
Igor Jankowski after the premiere of Lux in Tenebris at the Cathedral of Our Lady in Koszalin in 2011

- Two pastorals for the male band (2005)
- Poem for flute and piano (2006)
- Variations for violin and piano (2006)
- Zachód słońca for a cappella mixed choir to poems by M. Bogdanowicz (2006)
- Nokturn for a piano(2006)
- Prelude and grotesque for a piano (2006)
- Jesienna minutka for a piano (2006)
- Triptych for children for a piano (2006)
- Ekspromt for a accordion (2006)
- Bogurodzico musical illustration to history for clarinet, trombone, piano and cello (2007)
- Triptych to the poems by Jakub Kołos for mixed choir a cappella (2007)
- Pasja Chrystusa for solo organ (2007)
- Pop and classic reflection for a string quartet (2008)
- Suite for a cappella mixed choir in four movements to poems by Taras Shevchenko (2008)
- Carol diptych for mixed choir a cappella set to folk texts (2008)
- Z lasu, lasu ciemnego, variations on the theme of the Russian folk song for piano (2008)
- Niemen to the poems by Jakub Kołos for tenor and orchestra of folk instruments (2008)
- Istlewajut zwuki w efirie for soprano and string quartet to poems by A. Akhmatova (2008)
- Mysterium Fidei cantata for mixed choir, soloists and organ (2009)
- Oj, rzeka with own lyrics for a folk band a cappella (2009)
- Grzybki for female alto and folk orchestra (2009)
- Oj, Jurija for baritone and folk orchestra (2009)
- Maślnica choreographic suite for choir, orchestra of folk instruments and ballet group (2010)
- Trzy impresje for a button accordion (2010)
- Lux in Tenebris ballet (2011)
- Libera nos for mixed choir a cappella (2011)
- Diptych for Edward Stachura's memorial for mixed choir a cappella (2011)
- Trzy metamorfozy for clarinet, conga, marimba and button accordion (2012)
- Six Polish Hejnał for trumpet in B and in C (2012)
- Pod Twoju miłość for a cappella mixed choir to Orthodox liturgical texts (2013)
- Rhapsody for button accordion and symphony orchestra (2014)
- Gloria for mixed choir a cappella (2014)
- Panienko Skępska for baritone and organ (2015)
- Miejcie wiarę for soprano, tenor, mixed choir and organ (2016)
- Psalm 142 for mixed choir a cappella (2016)
- Triptych for solo organ (2017)
- Qvo Vadis author's album, containing 11 vocal and instrumental pieces. Published by SOLITON Sopot (2018)
- Choral Works third author's album. Contains 12 compositions for mixed a cappella choir (2019)
- Да молчит всякая плоть Orthodox church concert piece for a cappella mixed choir for the assistant Dr. Maria Januszkiewicz from the Academy of Music in Krakow (2019)
- Gloria author's piece for Christmas with a music video
- The Best Songs forth author's album, containing 16 vocal and instrumental pieces in Polish, English and Italian (2021)

== Bibliography ==
- Biography in Polmic service (in Polish)
- Biography on the website of Polskie Wydawnictwo Muzyczne (in Polish)
- Town Hall in Bobolice, city bugle-call composed by Igor Jankowski (in Polish)
- Alina Konieczna in an interview with Igor Jankowski, He honored the Polish Pope with music (in Polish), in: „Głos Koszaliński”, N 77 (1286), s. 5, 2 April 2011.
- Festival of Belarusian Culture in Pomerania (in Polish)
- Belarusian Culture Festival Facebook page (in Polish)
