= Igor Rasko =

Russian ice hockey player

- Born: October 7, 1966 (age 59) Moscow, Russian SFSR, Soviet Union
- Height: 5 ft 11 in (180 cm)
- Weight: 187 lb (85 kg; 13 st 5 lb)
- Position: Centre
- Shot: Left
- Played for: Krylya Sovetov Moscow; HC Pardubice
- Playing career: 1981–1997

Igor Vladimirovich Rasko (Russian: Игорь Владимирович Расько; born October 7, 1966) is a Russian former professional ice hockey centre.

Rasko played 170 games for Krylya Sovetov Moscow of the Soviet Hockey League from 1981 to 1989. He also played seven games for HC Pardubice of the Czech Extraliga in the 1993–94 season.

Rasko played in the 1985 World Junior Ice Hockey Championships for the Soviet Union, winning a bronze medal.
