= Russian real estate fraud =

Real estate fraudster in Russia

Black realtors (Russian: чёрные риелторы, romanized: chornyye riyeltory) are real estate fraudsters in Russia and Belarus.

== Types of fraud ==
In a common scheme, an agent colludes with a property owner, after the sale they appeal to a corrupt judge to invalidate the sale due to temporary insanity, and the buyer loses the money. The buyer may sue, but usually unsuccessfully. As a defense against this type of fraud, In Moscow the condition was introduced for the seller to get a certificate of the absence of mental illness.

Another type of fraud involves builders who pre-sale unfinished buildings and a discount and then declare bankruptcy.

Some black realtors look for old, lonely, or alcoholic sellers, defraud them, and if the victims protest, kill them.

== Notable cases ==
- Ihar Hershankou, Belarus; sentenced to death and executed in 2018
