= Ihar Hershankou =

Belarusian criminal (b. 1981, d. 2018)

Ihar Piatrovich Hershankou (also Hershankoŭ; Belarusian: Ігар Пятровіч Гершанкоў; Russian: Игорь Петрович Гершанков, Igor' Petrovich Gershankov; ca. 1981 — 19 or 20 November 2018) was a convicted Belarusian serial killer and fraudster.

Hershankou was one of the leaders of "black realtors" group of criminals who took over homes through legal means and then murdered the former owners. Hershankou's criminal activities took place in Mahilioŭ, Belarus. He was convicted of murdering six people between 2009 and 2015. He was sentenced to death in 2017 and executed by shooting in 2018.

== Early life ==
Hershankou graduated from a professional college as an automotive mechanic. He served in the Armed Forces of Belarus. After demobilization, he found work as a driver delivering candies to shops. In 2002, he met Tacciana Hershankova and they opened a real estate business that offered financial assistance to pay off debts by exchanging a client's home for a smaller house and a lump sum payment. The couple targeted debt-ridden alcoholics.

In 2009, Hershankou killed a client with a bat after closing a real estate deal. He then strangled the client's partner and buried their corpses in a village cemetery. The double murder remained undiscovered until 2015.

In 2010 Hershankou and Hershankova were sentenced to 5 years in prison for fraud after they refused to make payments to clients.

After an early release in 2012, Hershankou and Hershankova opened another real estate company targeting similar clients. The couple partnered with Siamion Berazhnoy, who at that time; had no history with real estate. As was past practice, Hershankou obtained a list of major debtors and they chose a man named Larionov, who lived in Mogilev.

Berazhnoy pretended to be a municipal employee and showed Larionov a mix of real and forged documents stating that his house would be taken away by city authorities. Hershankou offered to purchase the home before the city could seize it. To celebrate Hershankou and Berazhnoy drank vodka, but laced Larionov's with clonidine. After losing consciousness, Larionov was tied up and buried alive in a village cemetery in Chavusy District. In 2013–2015, three more people were killed the same way.

Hershankou and Berazhnoy were arrested in 2015 after a failed murder attempt. Berazhnoy and Hershankou cooperated with authorities, and Hershankou confessed to the murders.

In 2016, Mahilioŭ regional court sentenced Hershankou and Berazhnoy to death. In 2017, Hershankova was sentenced to 24 years in prison for her role. The Supreme Court of Belarus dismissed the appeal. The UN Human Rights Committee called for the delay and review of Berazhnoy and Hershankou's case.

According to the human rights group Viasna-96, Hershankou and Berazhnoy were executed on the night of 19–20 November 2018.

Amnesty International condemned their executions.
