= Igor Golyak =

Ukrainian-American Theatre Director

- Born: 1979 (age 46–47); Kyiv, Ukraine
- Education: Russian Institute of Theatre Arts (MA, Directing) Boris Shchukin Theatre Institute (MA, Acting)
- Occupation: Theater director
- Awards: Lucille Lortel Awards, Elliot Norton Awards
- Website: https://www.IgorGolyakStudio.com/, https://www.ArlekinPlayers.com/

Igor Golyak (born 1979) is a Ukrainian-American theatre director. He has received recognition for his work off-Broadway and in his adopted hometown of Boston. Golyak’s productions have won or been nominated for numerous awards, including winning four Lucille Lortel Awards in 2025 for his production of Our Class by Tadeusz Słobodzianek in the categories of outstanding revival, outstanding director, outstanding ensemble and scenic design.

In Boston, he has won Elliot Norton Awards in the categories of outstanding production (small) for The Dybbuk in 2025, and outstanding direction and production (small) for The Stone (Der Stein) by Marius von Mayenburg in 2020. Two of his virtual productions were named The New York Times Critic’s Picks: chekhovOS/an experimental game and State vs. Natasha Banina. The Wall Street Journal included Our Class in their Best Theater of 2024 list.

== Early life and education ==
Born in Kyiv, Ukraine, when it was part of the Soviet Union, Golyak was the first child of Sofiya and Mikhail Golyak. He learned that he was Jewish when he was 7 or 8 years old as his family prepared to emigrate to the U.S. In 1990 when Golyak was 11, his family settled near Boston, Massachusetts. Golyak attended Brookline High School where he first discovered his passion for theater after being cast in the lead role of a school play.

After graduating from high school in 1998, Golyak went to Moscow, Russia to study theatre. He earned a master’s degree in directing from the Russian Institute of Theatre Arts and a master’s in acting from the Boris Shchukin Theatre Institute under the Vakhtangov State Academic Theatre.

== Career ==
After returning from Russia to the Boston area in 2004, Golyak found it difficult to break into the professional theater world and he worked a variety of jobs for several years.

In 2009, Golyak founded -Arlekin! (then “Arlekin Players Theatre”) in Needham, Massachusetts with a group of Russian immigrant actor friends and continues to serve as its producing artistic director. "Arlekin" means "harlequin" in both Russian and Ukrainian. For the first several years, the group mostly performed in Russian for the immigrant community. Golyak’s virtual and hybrid productions during the COVID lockdown period allowed his work to be seen by much broader audiences, including viewers in 55 countries. They also attracted the attention of high-profile future collaborators, such as Mikhail Baryshnikov and Jessica Hecht, who appeared in both the live and virtual performances of The Orchard, Golyak’s adaptation of The Cherry Orchard. He also worked with Chulpan Khamatova on Our Class and with Andrey Burkovsky on both Our Class and The Dybbuk.

In 2020, Golyak launched the Zero Gravity (Zero-G) Lab, through which he has produced several virtual plays incorporating experimental technologies in theater.

In addition to directing, Golyak has taught acting at the Boston Conservatory at Berklee and has served as a guest lecturer at several colleges and universities in the Boston area.

== Selected works ==
| Year | Title | Role | Venue | Reference |
|---|---|---|---|---|
| 2016 | Natasha's Dream | Director | Arlekin Players Theatre | |
| 2017 | Dead Man's Diary | Director (adapted) | Arlekin Players Theatre | |
| 2018 | We/Us | Director (conceived, adapted) | Arlekin Players Theatre | |
| 2019 | The Stone (Der Stein) | Director | Arlekin Players Theatre | |
| 2019 | The Seagull | Director | Arlekin Players Theatre | |
| 2020 | State vs. Natasha Banina | Director (conceived, adapted) | Virtual/online | |
| 2020 | Insulted. Belarus(sia) | Director | Virtual/online | |
| 2021 | Witness | Director (conceived, adapted) | Virtual/online | |
| 2021 | The Merchant of Venice | Director | Boston Center for the Arts | |
| 2022 | The Orchard | Director (conceived, adapted) | Baryshnikov Arts Center, NYC | |
| 2022 | The Orchard Experience | Director (conceived, adapted) | Virtual/online | |
| 2023 | Just Tell No One | Director (adapted) | Lincoln Center, NYC | |
| 2023 | Just Tell No One | Director (adapted) | Huntington Theatre, Boston, MA | |
| 2023 | Just Tell No One | Director (adapted) | Arlekin Players Theatre | |
| 2023 | The Gaaga | Director of virtual production | Beat Brew Hall, Cambridge, MA | |
| 2024 | The Dybbuk: Between Two Worlds | Director | Vilna Shul, Boston, MA | |
| 2024 | The Merchant of Venice | Director | Classic Stage Company, NYC | |
| 2024 | Our Class (Nasza Klasa) | Director | Brooklyn Academy of Music, NYC | |
| 2024 | Our Class (Nasza Klasa) | Director | Classic Stage Company, NYC | |
| 2025 | Our Class (Nasza Klasa) | Director | Boston Center for the Arts | |
| 2025 | The Wanderers | Director | Marylebone Theatre, London | |
| 2026 | Delirium | Director (translated, adapted) | Boston Center for the Arts The Space at Irondale, NYC | |

== Selected awards and honors ==
| Year | Award | Category | Work | Result | Reference |
|---|---|---|---|---|---|
| 2020 | Elliot Norton Awards | Outstanding direction, small theater | The Stone (Der Stein) | Won | |
| 2020 | Elliot Norton Awards | Outstanding Production, small company | The Stone (Der Stein) | Won | |
| 2020 | New York Times Critic’s Pick | Critic's Pick | State vs. Natasha Banina | Selected | |
| 2021 | New York Times Critic’s Pick | Critic's Pick | chekhovOS/an experimental game | Selected | |
| 2022 | Elliot Norton Awards | Special Citation | State vs. Natasha Banina, Witness, chekhovOS | cited for creating "a new genre of theater” | |
| 2024 | Elliot Norton Awards | Outstanding play, small | The Gaaga | Nominated | |
| 2024 | Elliot Norton Awards | Outstanding Director | The Gaaga | Won, with Sasha Denisova | |
| 2024 | Wall Street Journal | Best Theater of 2024 List | Our Class | Selected | |
| 2024 | Drama League Awards | Outstanding revival of a play | Our Class | Nominated | |
| 2025 | Lucille Lortel Awards | Outstanding revival | Our Class | Won | |
| 2025 | Lucille Lortel Awards | Outstanding director | Our Class | Won | |
| 2025 | Lucille Lortel Awards | Outstanding projection design | Our Class | Nominated, with Eric Dunlap, and Andreea Mincic | |
| 2025 | Elliot Norton Awards | Outstanding play, small | The Dybbuk | Won | |
| 2025 | Elliot Norton Awards | Outstanding director | The Dybbuk | Nominated | |
