= Igor Sergei Klinki =

Igor Sergei Klinki (born 10 October 1959 in Kiev, Soviet Union) is a "virtual" poet created by the Argentine writer, artist, photographer and illustrator Rafael San Martín. As a fictitious character, he is endowed with a fictional biography and quasi fictional Bibliography.

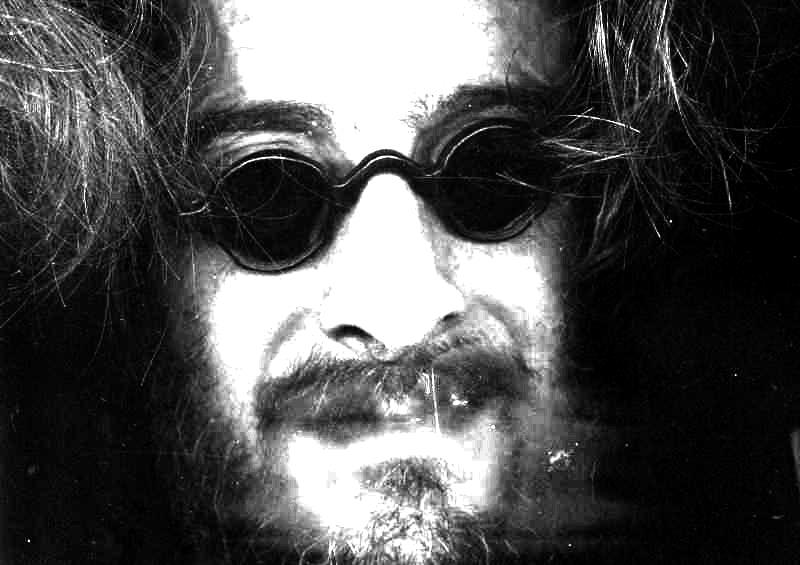
Igor Sergei Klinki

== Biography ==
According to his fictional biography:

During his childhood, his family moved to Mar del Plata, Argentina, where he studied architecture and took courses in journalism. He was president of the Foundation of Poets since 1995 until 2004, and he founded and directed La Blinda Rosada, a short literary magazine. Klinki's hilarious poetry is heavily influenced by absurdity, and his style frequently express a chaotic vision of reality. Nowadays he is producing multimedia projects, mixing science-fiction tokens with classical works that show his nihilist and anarchical conception of the world. Klinki has published his works under many pseudonyms: Rafael San Martín, Jan van der Chucky, María Fernanda Celtasso, Roberto Escoda, Antoine Jossé, Sergei Daviau, etcetera.

This meta-personal creation belongs to the postmodernist literary tradition, in turn referring back to Pirandello and Miguel de Unamuno and the more scholarly tradition of meta-fiction and false literary attribution, pioneered in Argentina by Jorge Luis Borges.

== Works attributed to him ==
- Before my suicide, poetry, 1969.
- Clouds, theatre, 1971.
- Poems of the day after, poetry, 1976.
- The ininhabitant, novel, 1979.
- Free Moscow, comic, 1981.
- The dream of the wind, poetry, 1993.
- Do not try to make sense, artist's book, 1994.
- Doors for Juliet, poetry, 1995.
- City without a name, poetry, 1997.
- La tormentad, poetry, 1999.
- Days and days, poetry, 2000.
- From the last country I travelled on, prechromatic manifest, 2000.
- O, experimental text on Erich Fromm’s To have or to be?, 2000.
- Impossibility of loving, essay, 2001.
- The difficulty of being a woman, essay, 2002.
- A dog called Laura Ibáñez, screenplay, 2003.
- 20 poems for reading in bed with me, poetry, 2003.
- Knowledge. Deconstruction, essay, 2005.
- Journal of an ininhabitant, history fiction, 2005.
- Never so close rushed forth the distant, essay on Jean-Luc Godard, 2006.
- The sun shines for the damned ones, poetry, 2006.
- Philosophy for the resistance, essay, 2006.
- The nature of the game, essay, 2006.
- Pretty woman, autobiography, 2006.
- Drowsih, screenplay, 2006.
- Carrousel des mandibules, screenplay, 2007.
