= Novosibirsk State Medical University =

Medical school in Novosibirsk, Russia

- Новосибирский государственный медицинский университет
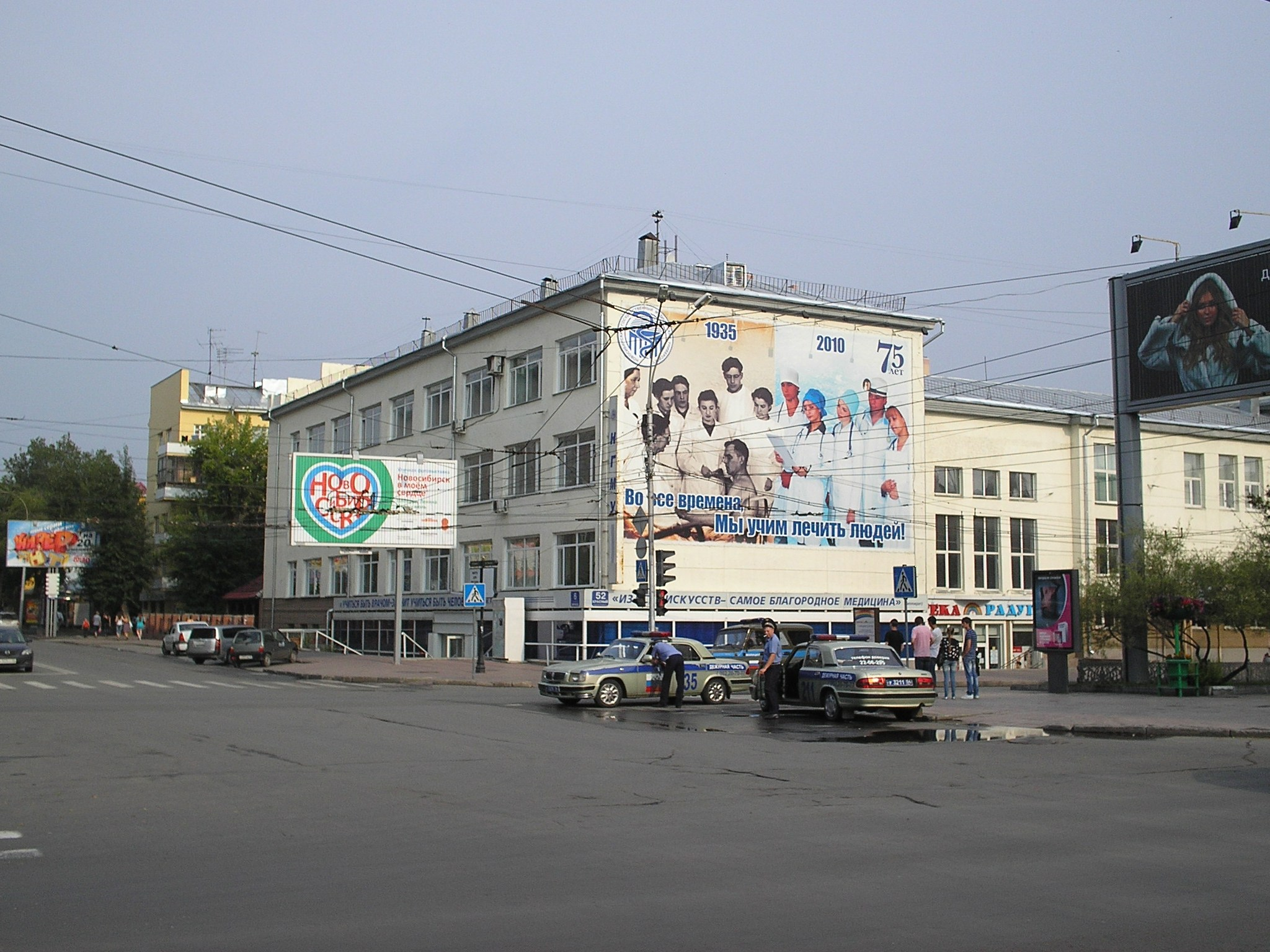
- Former names: Novosibirsk Medical Institute (until 1999); Novosibirsk Medical Academy (1999-2005)
- Type: Medical university
- Established: 17 August 1935
- Students: 5867
- Location: Krasny Prospekt 52, Novosibirsk, Russia; 55°02′10″N 82°55′11″E
- Website: ngmu.ru

Novosibirsk State Medical University (NSMU) (Russian: Новосибирский государственный медицинский университет, НГМУ) is a medical university in Novosibirsk, Russia for training doctors. It was organized in 1935. Until 1999 it was known as the Novosibirsk medical institute. From 1999 to 2005 it is the Novosibirsk state medical academy. In 2005 it was renamed Novosibirsk State Medical University. The university's rector from 2008 is Prof. Marinkin I.O.

== Facilities ==
- the medical advisory center
- institute of cosmetology
- institute of internal medicine
- advice of independent medical experts
- the certified center
- the central certifying commission in SFO
- the international center
- the district center of protection of motherhood and the childhood
- a sports camp
- publishing house Sibmedizdat ("Сибмедиздат")
- a video studio Avitsenna ("Авиценна")

Also, a newspaper and "Magazine of clinical and experimental medicine" is issued.

== Faculties ==
- Medical faculty
- Pediatric faculty
- Stomatologic faculty
- Pharmaceutical faculty
- Faculty of precollege preparations of professional training
- Faculty of the maximum sisterly formation
- Faculty of social work
- Faculty of economy and management in public health services
- Faculty of clinical psychology
- Ecological faculty
- Faculty of improvement of professional skill qualification
