= Sohodol (disambiguation) =

Sohodol is a Romanian toponym of Slavic origin, literally denoting a "dry valley" from a karstic limestone area.

Sohodol may refer to several inhabited places and creeks in Romania, listed alphabetically by county:

== Inhabited places ==
- Sohodol, a commune in Alba County
- Sohodol, a village in Albac Commune, Alba County
- Sohodol, a village in Măgura Commune, Bacău County
- Sohodol, a village in Căbești Commune, Bihor County
- Sohodol (Hungarian: Szohodol), a village in Bran Commune, Braşov County
- Sohodol, a village in Tismana town, Gorj County
- Sohodol (Szohodol), a village in Lelese Commune, Hunedoara County

== Creeks ==
- Sohodol (Arieș), a tributary of the Arieș in Alba County
- Sohodol (Bârsa), a tributary of the Bârsa in Brașov County
- Sohodol (Tismana), a tributary of the Tismana in Gorj County
- Sohodol, a tributary of the Jiul de Vest in Hunedoara County
- Sohodol, a tributary of the Nădrab in Hunedoara County
- Sohodol, a tributary of the Călmățui in Olt County

== See also ==
- Suhodol (disambiguation)
- Suchodół (disambiguation)
- Sukhodol (disambiguation)
