= Suhi Dol =

Suhi Dol may refer to:

- Suhi Dol (Surdulica), a village in the municipality of Surdulica, Serbia
- Suhi Dol, Travnik, a village in the municipality of Travnik, Bosnia and Herzegovina

== See also ==
- Suvi Dol, a village in the city of Vranje, Serbia
- Suvi Do (disambiguation), several villages in Serbia and Kosovo
- Suhindol, a town in Bulgaria
- Suhodol (disambiguation)
- Suvodol (disambiguation)
