= Suvodol =

Suvodol may refer to the following places:

== North Macedonia ==
- Suvodol, Demir Hisar, a village in the Pelagonia region
- Suvodol, Makedonski Brod, a village in the Southwestern region
- Suvodol, Novaci, a village in Novaci Municipality, in the Pelagonia region
  - Suvodol coal mine

== Serbia ==
- Suvodol (Smederevo), a village in Podunavlje District, Serbia
- Mali Suvodol and Veliki Suvodol, villages in Pirot District, Serbia
- Suvodol monastery, a monastery in Zaječar District, Serbia

== See also ==
- Battle of Suvodol
- Suhodol (disambiguation)
- Suvi Do (disambiguation)
