= Suvi Do =

Suvi Do (Serbo-Croatian for "Dry valley") may refer to:

- Suvi Do (Blace), a village in the municipality of Blace, Serbia
- Suvi Do (Niš), a village in the city of Niš, Serbia
- Suvi Do (Tutin), a village in the municipality of Tutin, Serbia
- Suvi Do (Žagubica), a village in the municipality of Žagubica, Serbia
- Suvi Do (Lipljan), a village in the municipality of Lipljan, Kosovo
- Suvi Do (Mitrovica), a village in the municipality of Mitrovica, Kosovo

or:

- Banjski Suvi Do, a village in the municipality of Zvečan, Kosovo
- Donji Suvi Do, a village in the municipality of Mitrovica, Kosovo
- Gornji Suvi Do, a village in the municipality of Mitrovica, Kosovo

== See also ==
- Suvi Dol, a village in the city of Vranje, Serbia
- Suhi Dol (disambiguation)
