= Sukhodol =

Sukhodol may refer to the following Russian entities:

- Sukhodol, Samara Oblast, an urban locality
- Sukhodol, Gafuriysky District, Republic of Bashkortostan, a rural locality
- Sukhodol, Vladimir Oblast, a rural locality
- Sukhodol, Volgograd Oblast, a rural locality
- Sukhodol (novel), a novel by Ivan Bunin

== See also ==
- Suhodol (disambiguation), places in the Balkans
- Suchodol (disambiguation), places in Poland and Czechia
