= Karađorđe =

19th-century Serbian revolutionary leader and dynasty founder

Karađorđe Карађорђе
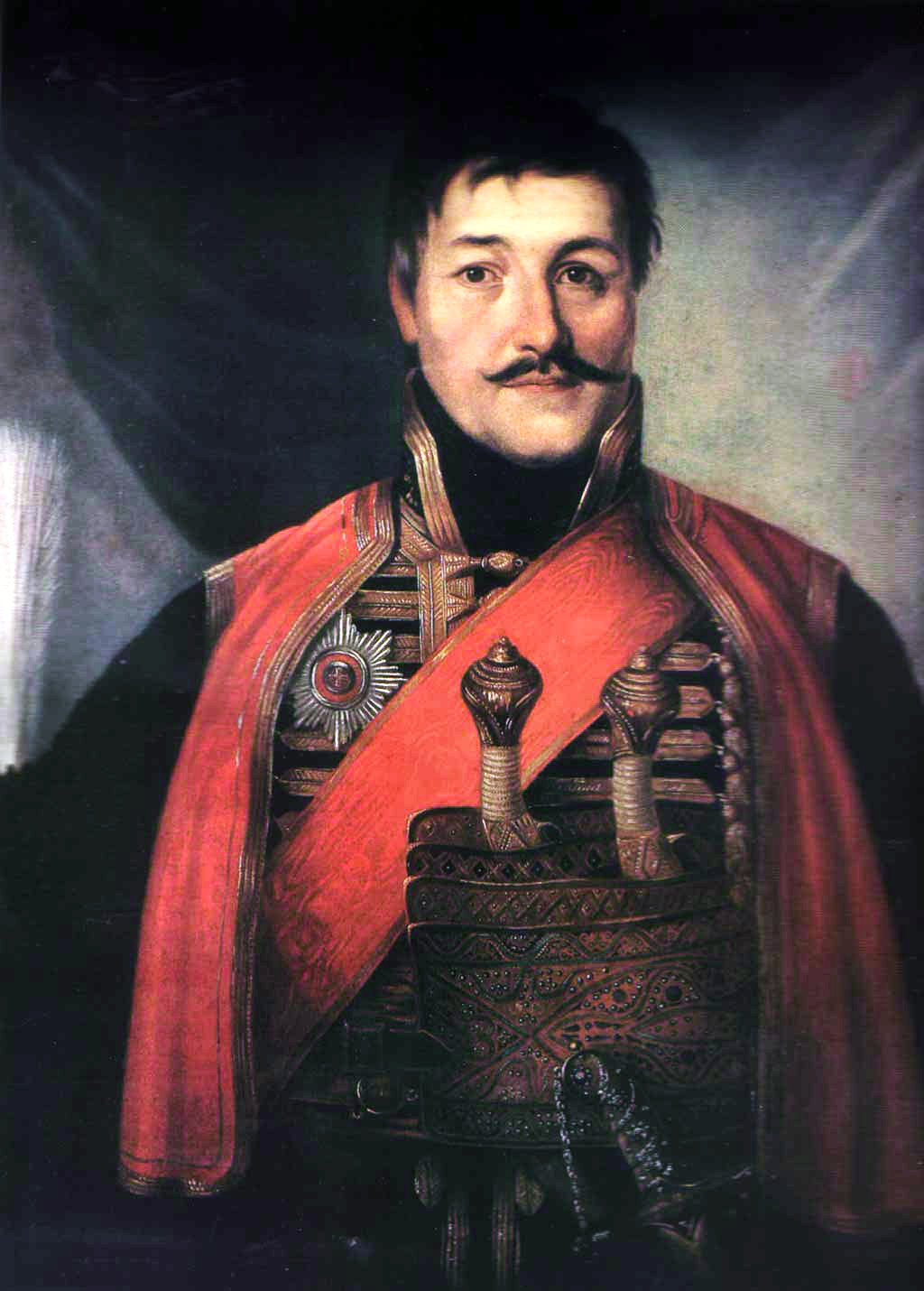
- Karađorđe, by Vladimir Borovikovsky, 1816

Grand Vožd of Serbia
- Reign: 14 February 1804 – 3 October 1813
- Predecessor: Title created
- Successor: Miloš Obrenović I

President of the Governing Council
- Reign: 22 January 1811 – 3 October 1813
- Predecessor: Jakov Nenadović
- Successor: Petar Nikolajević Moler (1815)
- Born: 14 November [O.S. 3 November] 1768; Viševac, Sanjak of Smederevo, Rumelia Eyalet, Ottoman Empire
- Died: 25 July [O.S. 13 July] 1817 (aged 48); Radovanje Grove, Sanjak of Smederevo, Rumelia Eyalet, Ottoman Empire
- Burial: Oplenac
- Spouse: Jelena Jovanović (m. 1785)
- Issue: Sima, Sava, Sara, Poleksija, Stamenka, Aleksa, Alexander
- House: Karađorđević
- Father: Petar Jovanović
- Mother: Marica (née Živković)
- Religion: Serbian Orthodox
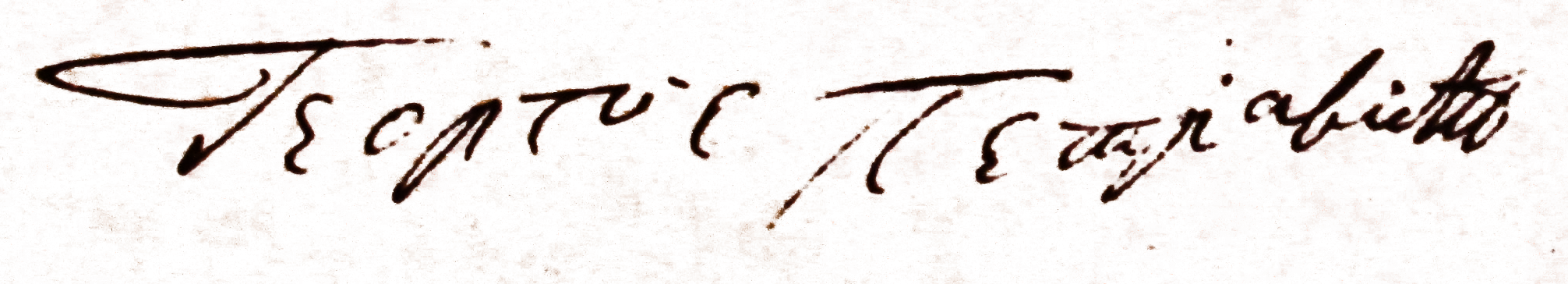
- Signature

Military service
- Allegiance: Revolutionary Serbia
- Years of service: 1787—1791; 1804–1813
- Rank: Grand Vožd of Serbia
- Commands: Serbian Free Corps; Revolutionary Army
- Battles/wars: Austro-Turkish War; Siege of Belgrade (1789); Serbian Revolution; Battle of Batočina; Battle of Drlupa; Battle of Bratačić; Battle of Ivankovac; Battle of Mišar; Battle of Deligrad; Siege of Belgrade (1806); Siege of Užice (1807); Battle of Suvodol; Battle of Malajnica; Battle of Varvarin; Battle of Loznica; Battle of Ravanj
- Awards: Order of Saint Anna; Order of Saint Vladimir

Đorđe Petrović (pronounced [dʑôːrdʑe pětrovitɕ]; Serbian: Ђорђе Петровић; 14 November [O.S. 3 November] 1768 – 25 July [O.S. 13 July] 1817), known by the sobriquet Karađorđe (pronounced [kâradʑoːrdʑe]; Serbian: Карађорђе, lit. 'Black George'), was a Serbian revolutionary leader who led a struggle against the Ottoman Empire during the First Serbian Uprising. Karađorđe Petrović held the title of Grand Vožd of Serbia from 14 February 1804 to 3 October 1813.

Born into an impoverished family in the Šumadija region of Ottoman Serbia, Karađorđe distinguished himself during the Austro-Turkish War of 1788–1791 as a member of the Serbian Free Corps, a Habsburg militia of ethnic Serbs, armed and trained by the Austrians to fight the Ottoman Turks. Fearing retribution following the Austrians' and Serb rebels' defeat in 1791, he and his family fled to the Austrian Empire, where they lived until 1794, when a general amnesty was declared. Karađorđe subsequently returned to Šumadija and became a livestock merchant. In 1796, the rogue governor of the Sanjak of Vidin, Osman Pazvantoğlu, invaded the Pashalik of Belgrade, and Karađorđe fought alongside the Ottomans to quash the incursion.

In early 1804, following a massacre of Serb chieftains by renegade Ottoman janissaries known as Dahis, the Serbs of the Pashalik rebelled. Karađorđe was unanimously elected to lead the uprising against the Dahis at an assembly of surviving chiefs in February 1804. Within six months, most of the Dahi leaders had been captured and executed by Karađorđe's forces, and by 1805, the final remnants of Dahi resistance had been crushed. Karađorđe and his followers demanded far-reaching autonomy, which Sultan Selim III interpreted as but the first step towards complete independence. Selim promptly declared jihad against the rebels and ordered an army to march into the Pashalik. The Ottomans suffered a string of defeats at the hands of Karađorđe's forces. By 1806, the rebels had captured all the major towns in the Pashalik, including Belgrade and Smederevo, and expelled their Muslim inhabitants. Burdened by the demands of the Russo-Turkish War of 1806–1812, Selim offered the Serbs extensive autonomy. However, Karađorđe refused in light of Russia's avowal to aid the rebels should they continue fighting.

Frequent infighting, together with Napoleon's invasion of Russia in 1812, weakened the rebels, and the Ottomans were able to reverse many of their gains. Karađorđe was forced to flee Serbia in October 1813 and Belgrade fell later that month, bringing the First Serbian Uprising to a close. He and his followers sought refuge in the Austrian Empire, but were arrested. Despite Ottoman requests for extradition, the Austrians handed Karađorđe over to the Russians, who offered him refuge in Bessarabia. There, he joined the Greek secret society known as Filiki Eteria, which planned to launch a pan-Balkan uprising against the Ottomans. Karađorđe returned to Serbia in secret in July 1817, but was killed shortly thereafter by agents of Miloš Obrenović, a rival rebel leader, who was concerned that Karađorđe's reappearance would cause the Ottomans to renege on the concessions they had agreed to following the Second Serbian Uprising of 1815. Karađorđe is considered the founder of the house of Karađorđević, which ruled Serbia in several intervals during the 19th and 20th centuries. His murder resulted in a violent, decades-long feud between his descendants and those of the Obrenović family, with the Serbian throne changing hands several times.

== Origins ==
Đorđe Petrović was born into an impoverished family in the village of Viševac, in the Šumadija region of Ottoman Serbia, on 14 November [O.S. 3 November] 1768. (Note: The year of his birth is uncertain, though most historians believe it to have been 1768.) He was the oldest of his parents' five children. His father, Petar Jovanović, was a highwayman (or hajduk) in his youth, but had since become a peasant farmer. His mother, Marica (née Živković), was a homemaker. Petrović's surname was derived from his father's given name, in line with contemporary Serbian naming conventions. Like most of his contemporaries, Petrović was illiterate. His family celebrated the feast day of Saint Clement. They are said to have been descended from the Vasojevići tribe of Montenegro's Lim river valley. His ancestors are thought to have migrated from Montenegro to Šumadija in the late 1730s or early 1740s. Petrović's childhood was strenuous and difficult. His parents were forced to move around often in search of a livelihood. His father worked as a day labourer and servant for a sipahi, an Ottoman cavalryman. Petrović himself spent his adolescence working as a shepherd. In 1785, he married Jelena Jovanović, the daughter of Nikola Jovanović, obor-knez of Jasenica, whose family hailed from the village of Masloševo. The couple had seven children, six of whom reached adulthood.

Petrović worked for several landlords across Šumadija until 1787, when he and his family left the region and settled in the Habsburg monarchy ("Austria"), fearing persecution at the hands of the Ottoman janissaries. It is said that as they were preparing to cross the Danube into Austria, Petrović's father began to have second thoughts about leaving Šumadija. Knowing that the entire family would be put in jeopardy if his father stayed behind, Petrović either took his father's life or arranged for someone to kill him instead. (Note: According to the historian Michael Broers, the story is likely apocryphal. The historian Michael Boro Petrovich disagrees, saying "it is no legend", that the event really occurred. According to the author and diplomat Duncan Wilson, rumours that Karađorđe had killed his own father had spread throughout Šumadija by 1804.)

== Early military exploits ==
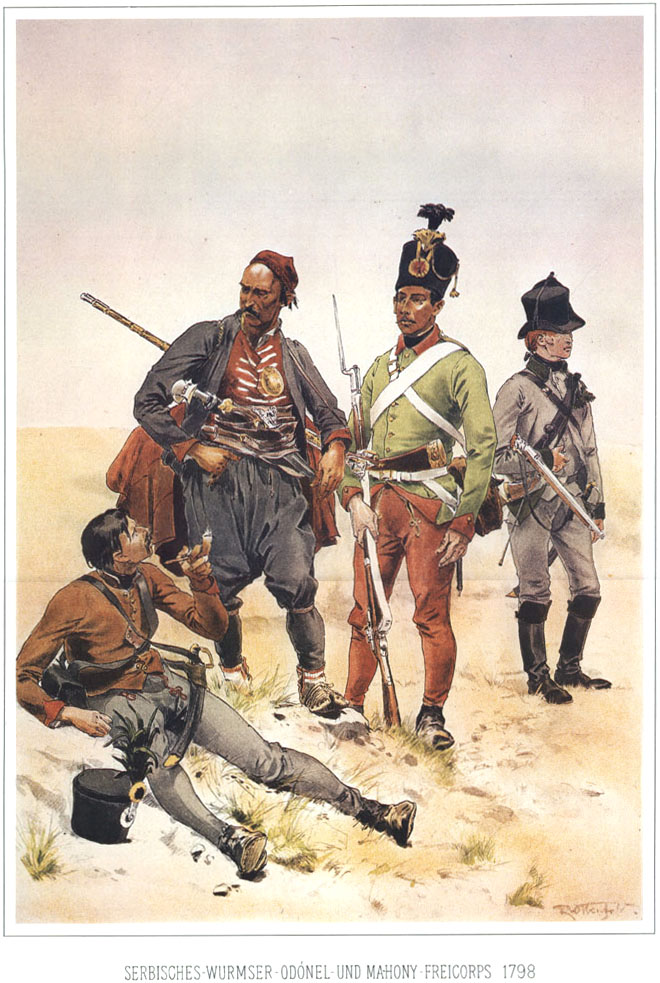
Members of the Serbian Free Corps, 1798

Following the outbreak of the Austro-Turkish War of 1788–1791, Petrović joined the Serbian Free Corps (German: Serbische Freikorps), and took part in fighting the Ottomans in western Serbia. The Free Corps was a volunteer militia made up of both Ottoman and Habsburg Serbs that was armed and trained by the Austrians. It was led by a Habsburg Serb officer, Major Mihailo Mihaljević. Petrović's participation in the war brought him invaluable military experience, as well as insight into the Austrians' military techniques. He distinguished himself in combat and was decorated for bravery, reaching the rank of sergeant (German: Wachtmeister). In this capacity, he was given command over a squad of 25 men.

The Austrians and Serb rebels briefly succeeded in liberating a strip of land east and south of Belgrade, which in Serbian historiography came to be known as Koča's Frontier (Serbian: Kočina Krajina), after one of the senior rebel leaders, Koča Anđelković. In 1791, the Austrians and Ottomans signed the Treaty of Sistova. The Austrians agreed to return all the territory that they and the Serbs had captured south of the Danube in exchange for minor territorial concessions in northern Bosnia, effectively abandoning the Serbs and leaving them to resist the Ottomans on their own. The rebels were crushed by 1792 and most of their leaders executed. Unwilling to surrender, Petrović became a hajduk and briefly fought the Ottomans as an outlaw. He and his family once again sought refuge in the Austrian Empire, this time finding sanctuary in the Krušedol Monastery, at the foot of Fruška Gora, where Petrović worked as a forester.

In 1793, Hadji Mustafa Pasha was appointed governor of the Pashalik of Belgrade. He declared a general amnesty for former rebels and announced that Muslims would no longer serve as tax-collectors in areas where Christians formed a majority of the population. These changes were part of a plan devised by Sultan Selim aimed at improving relations with the Pashalik's Christian population. Sensing that it was safe, Petrović returned to Šumadija in 1794, together with his family. He settled in Topola, where he became a livestock merchant and traded with the Austrians. His business dealings led him to establish connections with many Habsburg Serbs. In 1796, Osman Pazvantoğlu, the renegade governor of the Sanjak of Vidin, who had rejected the authority of the Sublime Porte, launched an invasion of the Pashalik of Belgrade. Overwhelmed, Mustafa Pasha formed a Serbian national militia to help stop the incursion. Petrović joined the militia and became a boluk-bashi (Serbian: Buljukbaša), (Note: Boluk-bashi was equivalent to the rank of captain.) leading a company of 100 men.

In return for their service, the Serbs of the Pashalik were granted a number of privileges. They were allowed to bear arms and raise autonomous military units. After the Serb militias joined the war on Mustafa Pasha's side, Pazvantoğlu suffered a string of defeats. He retreated to Vidin, which was subsequently besieged. The war against Pazvantoğlu marked the first time that Petrović distinguished himself in the eyes of the Ottomans, who bestowed him with the sobriquet "Black George" (Serbian: Karađorđe; Turkish: Kara Yorgi), partly because of his dark hair and partly because of his sinister reputation. Karađorđe's service in the Serbian militia resulted in him becoming well acquainted with Ottoman military doctrine.

== First Serbian Uprising (1804–1813) ==
=== Revolt against the Dahis ===
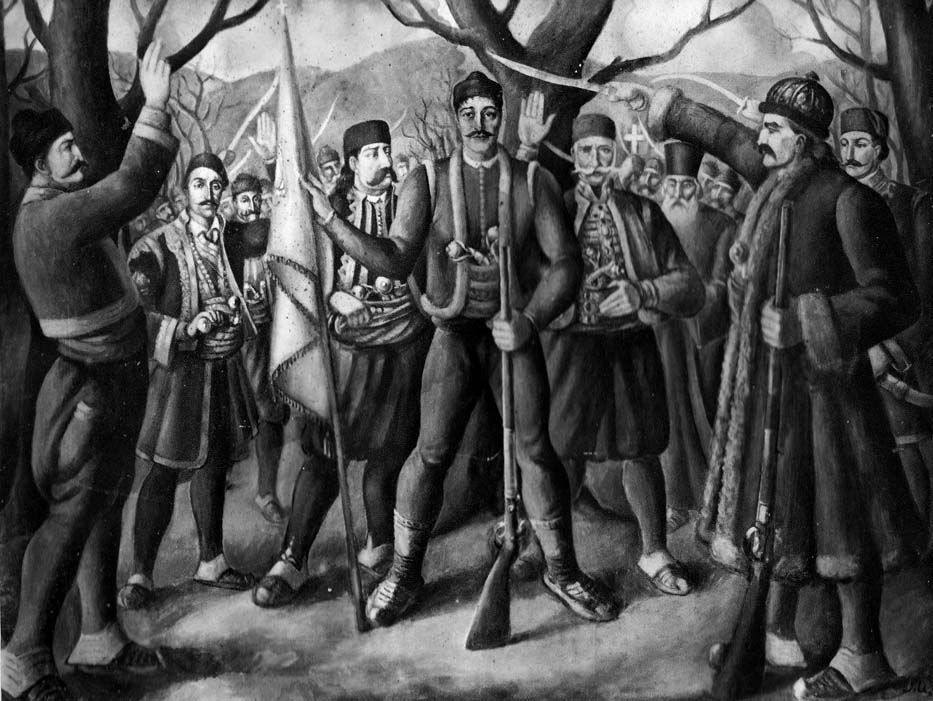
Nineteenth-century illustration of the Orašac Assembly with Karađorđe at its centre

In 1798, Napoleon invaded Egypt, forcing the Porte to redeploy thousands of regulars from the Balkans in order to resist the French. The janissaries in the Pashalik of Belgrade, known as Dahis (Serbian: Dahije), who had been expelled from the region on Selim's orders nearly a decade earlier, were pardoned and allowed to return to Belgrade on the condition that they obey Mustafa Pasha. The détente between the aging governor and the Dahis did not last long. In 1801, Mustafa Pasha was killed by a Dahi assassin.

The power vacuum caused by Mustafa Pasha's murder resulted in a period of infighting between the Dahis that would last until 1802. By this time, four senior Dahi commanders emerged triumphant and agreed to share power within the Pashalik. The Serbs were stripped of the privileges that they had been granted under Mustafa Pasha. Dahi bands roamed the countryside, killing peasants, looting property and setting homes on fire. Thousands of villagers were displaced and forced to flee into the mountains, where over the next several years, the able-bodied men formed ad hoc guerrilla bands.

In mid-July 1803, Karađorđe obtained arms and munitions from Habsburg Serb merchants in Zemun. Later that month, he dispatched couriers through Šumadija calling for a meeting of Serbian notables to devise a strategy for resisting the Dahis. The flow of arms from the Austrian Empire into the Pashalik, combined with their inability to crush the guerrillas in the countryside, made the Dahi leadership increasingly uneasy. In January and February 1804, the Dahis launched a pre-emptive assault against the Pashalik's Serbian chieftains (known as knezovi, or "princes"), killing between 70 and 150 of them. The killings outraged the Serbian rayah, the Pashalik's tax-paying lower class. By this time, Karađorđe was a well known and well respected figure in Šumadija. He narrowly escaped being killed in the two-month massacre, which came to be known as the Slaughter of the Knezes (Serbian: Seča knezova). Upon killing the chieftains, the Dahis impaled their severed heads on wooden stakes and put them on public display.

On Candlemas, 14 February [O.S. 2 February] 1804, the surviving chieftains assembled in the village of Orašac, near Aranđelovac, to decide on a course of action. They agreed to launch a rebellion against the Dahis and Karađorđe was elected without opposition to lead it. It is said that he twice refused to lead the uprising, arguing that his violent temper would make him unsuitable for the role. Karađorđe's initial refusal only reinforced the chieftains' convictions that he was the only suitable candidate, and eventually, he agreed to lead the rebels. This event marked the beginning of the First Serbian Uprising, the opening phase of what would come to be known as the Serbian Revolution.

By the start of the revolt, the Pashalik of Belgrade had a population of about 400,000, 10 percent of which was Muslim. Its Serb population was roughly 250,000. At first, the rebels numbered around 30,000 men. In this initial stage, they were joined by a significant amount of the Pashalik's Muslim population, whom the rebels dubbed the "Good Turks". (Note: The Serbs referred to all Muslims in the Pashalik as "Turks", though most of them were Bosnian Muslims, Albanians, or non-Turkish Muslims from other parts of the Ottoman Empire.) Karađorđe and his followers appealed to Sultan Selim for assistance against the Dahis, who had since rejected the authority of the Porte. Austria sent weapons and supplies to the rebels, while Russia lobbied on their behalf, encouraging the Porte to grant the Serbs further autonomy following the Dahis' removal. In May, Selim ordered a 7,000-strong army under of the command of Bekir Pasha, the governor of Bosnia, to march into the Pashalik. The Serbs welcomed Bekir Pasha and his men as liberators, and the Dahis were soon defeated through the joint efforts of Bekir Pasha's army and the rebels. By late August, the most prominent Dahi leaders had been captured by Karađorđe's men, beheaded, and their severed heads sent to the Sultan as trophies.

The Dahis resisted for another year before they were completely defeated. Karađorđe and his followers then demanded that Serbia be granted autonomous status similar to that enjoyed by neighbouring Wallachia. Selim suspected that Karađorđe's demands for autonomy were but the first step towards complete independence. He responded by declaring a jihad against the rebels. Hafiz Pasha, the Ottoman governor of Niš, was then ordered to march into Šumadija and destroy Karađorđe's army.

=== Rebellion against the Porte ===
==== Initial successes ====
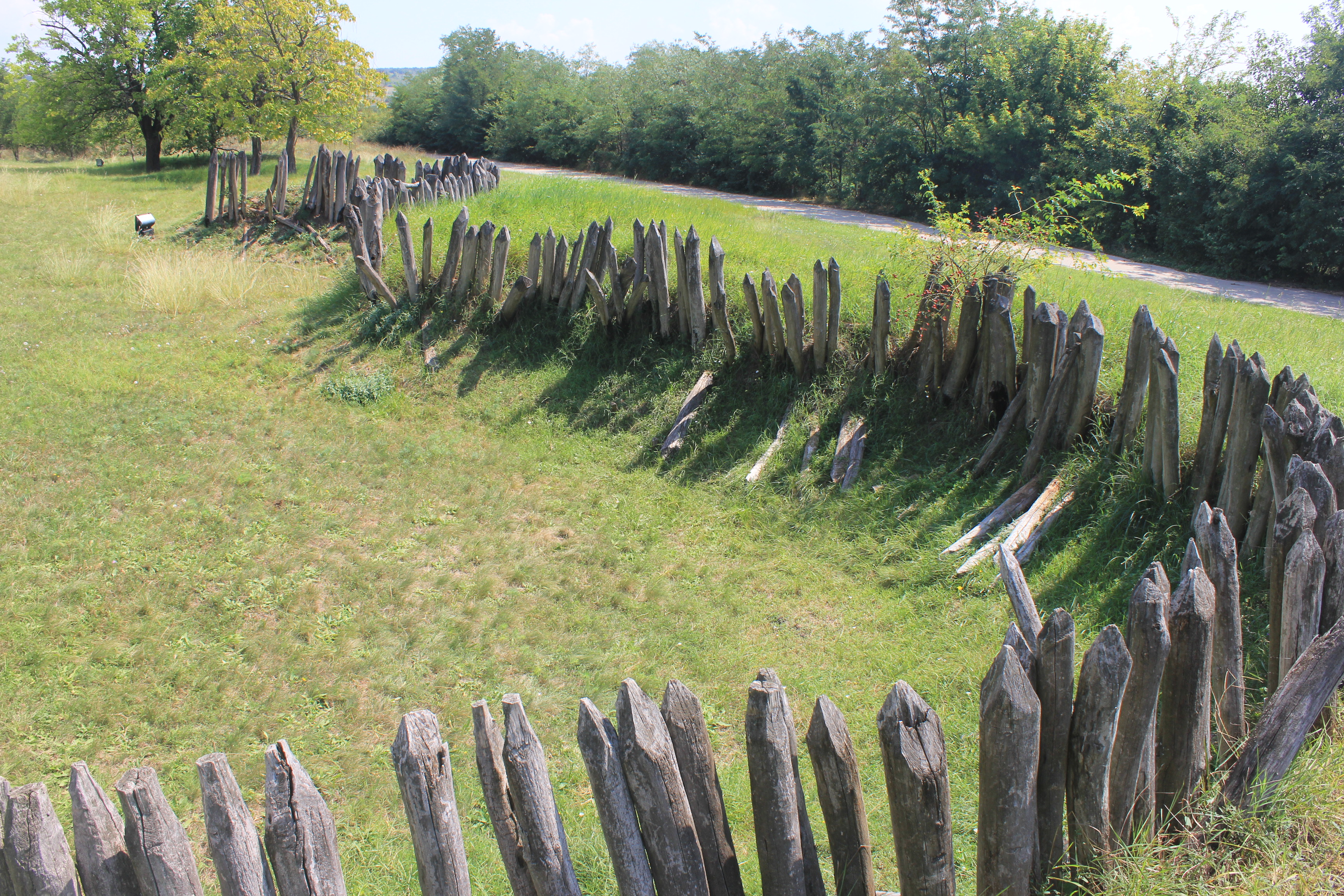
The remains of the sconce from the Battle of Deligrad

The rebels first clashed with Ottoman regulars at the Battle of Ivankovac in August 1805, scoring a decisive victory. Belgrade was soon besieged by about 16,000 rebel fighters. The rebel leaders used anti-Muslim rhetoric to mobilize the peasantry, calling upon them to rise up and drive the Ottomans "across the blue sea". In order to further galvanize the population, Karađorđe appealed to memories of the Battle of Kosovo of June 1389, which paved the way for the Ottoman conquest of Serbia and the rest of the western Balkans, declaring that Serbia's defeat in the battle needed to be avenged. He sought to further cement his authority by harkening back to symbols of Medieval Serbia, such as the relics of Stefan the First-Crowned, and placing old heraldic symbols on flags and seals to establish continuity between the Serbian Empire and himself. (Note: Among the old heraldic symbols was the double-headed white eagle used by the Nemanjić dynasty.) Portraits of Dušan the Mighty, the founder of the Serbian Empire, are said to have hung from the walls of the rebels' headquarters.

Karađorđe was feared by enemies and allies alike because of his volatile temper. He considered executions to be the only way in which military infractions could be rectified, and according to the military historian Brendon A. Rehm, personally killed 125 people. In 1806, he ordered that his brother Marinko be hanged. According to one account, Marinko had been accused of raping a peasant girl. Another suggests that he had been attempting to seduce young women whose husbands were away at the front. Whatever the case, Karađorđe entertained senior rebel leaders in his home while his brother's lifeless body dangled from the front gate—a warning to others to refrain from the behaviour in which Marinko had been engaging. Muslims, combatants and non-combatants alike, were killed unremittingly, as illustrated in this contemporary account describing the capture of the village of Čučuge, near Ub, in April 1806:

In their flight the Turks threw away their arms and clothing in order to run the better, but to no purpose. The Serbs caught up with them and killed them, some with swords, some with knives and some with daggers, while others had their brains beaten out with cudgels and staves. They say that over 2,800 Turks perished and only those got away who had good horses. When our army mustered again at the camp at Ub, I saw that many of our soldiers had blood-stained swords ... and their gun-butts also were smashed and broken; they were laden with every sort of spoil.

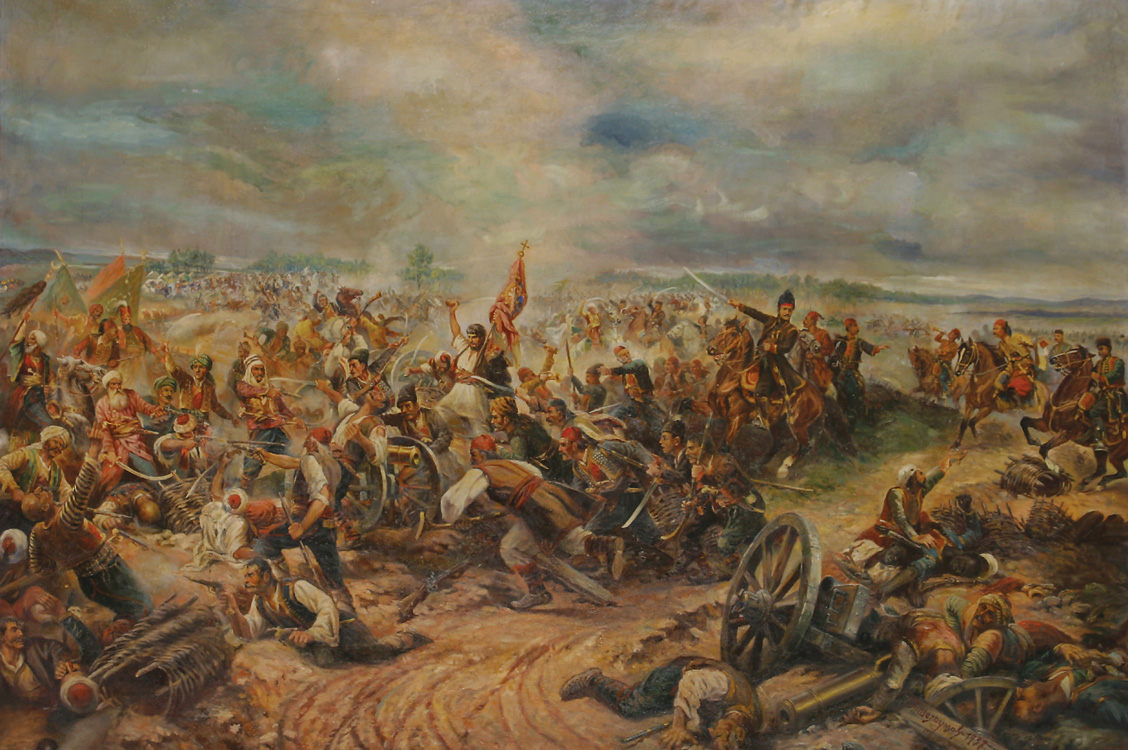
Battle of Mišar, painting by Afanasij Šeloumov

Serbs who neglected to join the uprising were brutalized in equal measure. Males who could not produce an adequate excuse for why they were not fighting were killed and their houses torched. While most of the rebels were Serbs, the Pashalik's Romani (Gypsy) residents, the majority of whom were Muslim, also fought on the rebel side. Some Albanians also pledged allegiance to Karađorđe and fought on his behalf.

In 1806, the rebels twice dispatched the diplomat Petar Ičko to Constantinople to negotiate with the Porte. The two parties eventually reached an understanding, which came to be known as Ičko's Peace, in which the Ottomans agreed to grant the rebels extensive autonomy. Due to the Balkans' poor communications and transport infrastructure, it took several months for news of the Porte's offer to reach the rebels. In August 1806, the rebels defeated the Ottomans at the Battle of Mišar. Later that month, they scored another victory at the Battle of Deligrad. Smederevo was captured in November and made the capital of Karađorđe's revolutionary state. Belgrade, with the exception of its imposing fortress, fell in early December. The outbreak of the Russo-Ottoman War that month, compounded by Russia's avowal to provide extensive materiel and financial support to the rebels should they continue fighting, convinced Karađorđe not to accept anything short of complete independence. He promptly refused to accept the terms of the agreement negotiated by Ičko.

In March 1807, Karađorđe issued a promise to Suleiman Pasha, the Governor of Belgrade, that he and his garrison would be granted safe passage if they vacated the city's besieged fortress. When Suleiman and his garrison emerged from the fortress, they were ambushed. Adult men were killed on the spot, women and girls were forcibly converted to Orthodox Christianity and made to marry their captors, and young children were placed in the care of Orthodox Christian families. One contemporary account suggests that as many as 3,000 non-Christians – mostly Muslims, but also Jews – were forced to convert to Orthodox Christianity. Jews that resisted conversion were either killed or expelled. Belgrade's mosques were either destroyed or turned into churches.

==== Losses mount ====
As the revolution progressed, rebel strength peaked at around 50,000 fighters. Despite their initial successes, the rebel leaders were seldom on good terms, and constant infighting plagued their camp. In the western part of the country, Jakov Nenadović was the principal figure. In the east, Milenko Stojković and Petar Dobrnjac held sway. The latter two opposed Karađorđe's attempts to create a centralized state, fearing that this would result in their own power being diminished. Others, such as Nenadović, complained that Karađorđe was becoming too authoritarian. Nenadović suggested that the rebels establish a central council to rein in Karađorđe's power and write a constitution based on the rule of law. Karađorđe balked at the possibility. "It's easy for this sovereign law of yours to rule in a warm room, behind this table", he responded, "but let us see tomorrow, when the Turks strike, who will meet them and beat them."

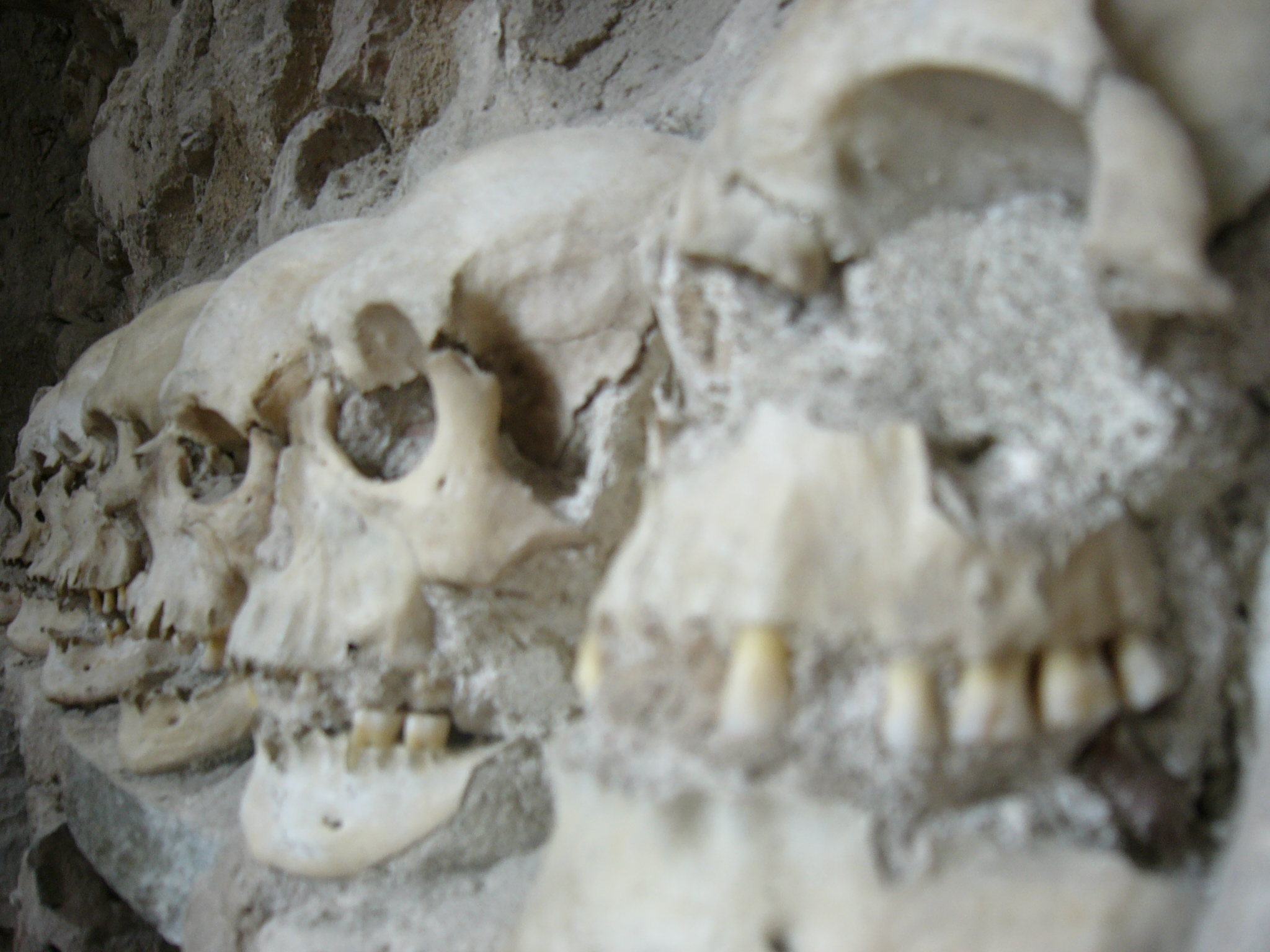
Detail of Skull Tower

In May 1809, the rebels captured Sjenica. They repulsed an Ottoman attack on the village of Suvodol in early June, and seized Novi Pazar later that month, but failed to take its fortress. Minor clashes also took place in the north of Kosovo. Lacking numbers and adequate military training, the rebels failed to establish a corridor to Montenegro and gain access to the Adriatic Sea, which Karađorđe had described as one of his key aims. The rebels experienced further setbacks in Niš, where 3,000 were surrounded at Čegar Hill in May–June 1809. Knowing that he and his men would be impaled if captured, rebel commander Stevan Sinđelić fired at his entrenchment's gun powder magazine, setting off a massive explosion that killed him and everyone else in the vicinity. On the site of the battle, the Ottoman commander Hurshid Pasha built a stone tower with the skulls of Sinđelić and his fighters embedded in its walls as a warning to others who wished to rebel.

The fall of Čegar allowed the Ottomans to establish a land corridor extending along the Morava River valley from Niš to the Danube. Their advance was brought to a halt after the Russians crossed the Danube in September 1809 and attacked the Ottomans in northern Bulgaria, offering the rebels temporary respite. The rebels soon recaptured all the land they had lost but were exhausted by the fighting. Henceforth, they were continuously on the defensive. The rebel leaders quarrelled amongst themselves, blaming each other for the recent defeats. Karađorđe blamed the Russians for not intervening earlier on the rebels' behalf. He subsequently wrote Napoleon seeking military assistance, and in 1810, dispatched an emissary to France. Nothing came of these requests, as the French did not believe that the rebels had the military capacity to dislodge the Ottomans from the Balkans. As his battlefield setbacks mounted, Karađorđe's behaviour became more volatile. In late 1809, he shot and wounded one of his commanders, Petar Jokić, for making a poor military decision in the vicinity of Ćuprija.

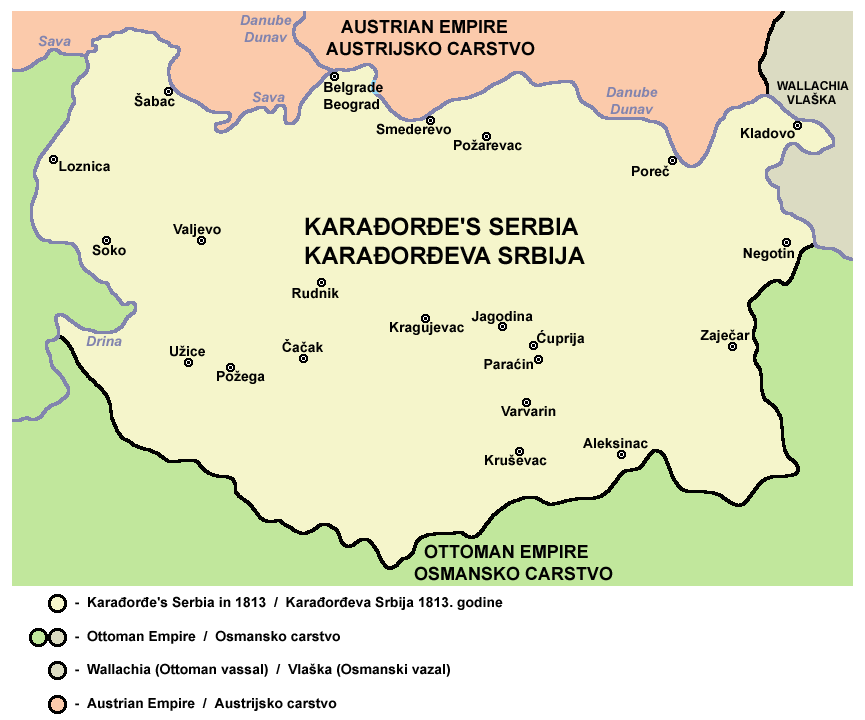
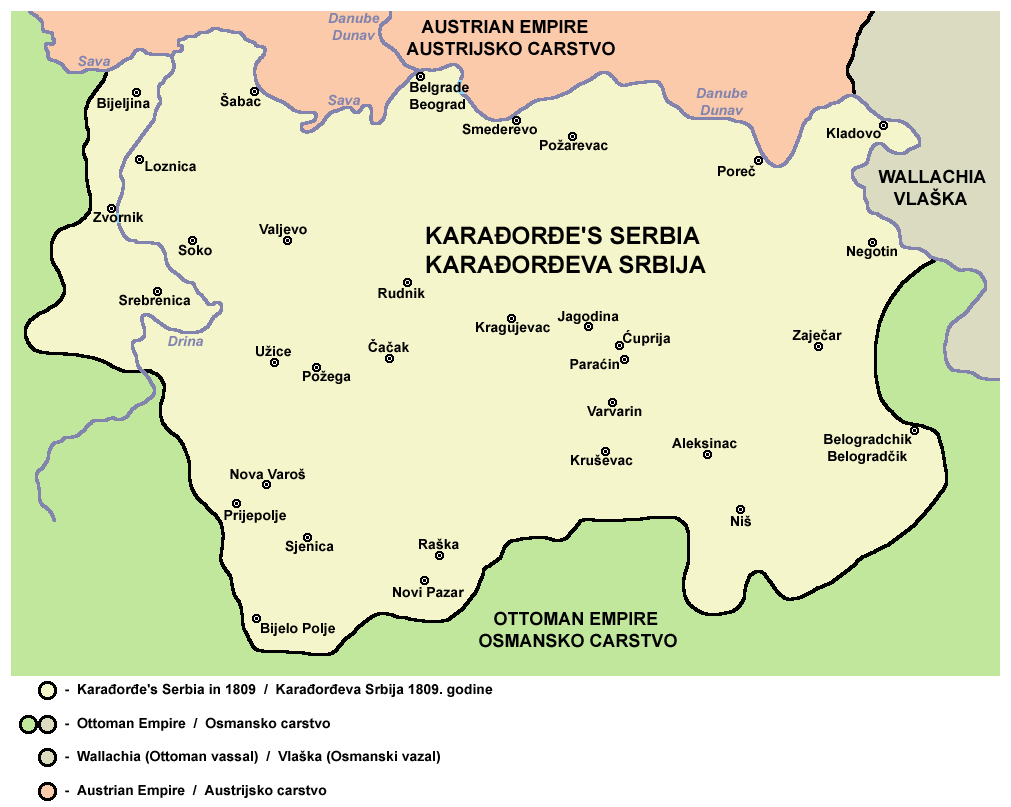
A map of Revolutionary Serbia in 1809 (left) and 1813 (right)

In 1810, Dobrnjac mutinied against Karađorđe and nearly succeeded in dislodging him. He was joined in his revolt by Milenko Stojković. In June 1810, Russian troops entered Serbia for a second time, distributing weapons and supplies to Karađorđe and his followers. Field Marshal Mikhail Kutuzov took part in planning joint actions against both the Ottomans and the mutineers. By the following year, Dobrnjac and Stojković were defeated. Karađorđe attempted to placate the mutineers. In January 1811, he established the People's Governing Council (Serbian: Praviteljstvujušči Sovjet), a cabinet consisting of members who supported Karađorđe as well as those who opposed him. It consisted of twelve members, one for each of the nahije (districts) of rebel Serbia. Karađorđe appointed Stojković as the Minister of Foreign Affairs, Nenadović as the Minister of the Interior, and Dobrnjac as the Minister of Justice. Also inducted into Karađorđe's cabinet were Mladen Milovanović, as the Minister of War; Dositej Obradović, as the Minister of Education; and Sima Marković, as the Minister of Finance. Dobrnjac and Stojković refused to accept the posts that were offered to them, fearing that their acceptance would legitimize Karađorđe and undermine their own position. Karađorđe accused them of insubordination and exiled them to Wallachia, replacing them with loyalists. The Governing Council soon recognized Karađorđe as Serbia's hereditary leader and pledged allegiance to his "lawful heirs".

==== Defeat ====
In mid-1812, Russia and the Ottoman Empire signed the Treaty of Bucharest, bringing the Russo-Ottoman War to a close. For his efforts, Karađorđe received the Order of Saint Anna from the Russians. The Governing Council scrambled to take an oath of loyalty to Russia in the hope that this would garner them further protection, to no avail. The Russian Emperor, Alexander, was aware of Napoleon's plans to invade Russia and desperately sought to return as many Russian soldiers as possible in order to repel the attack. As part of the Treaty of Bucharest, the Russians and Ottomans agreed that Serbian fortifications built after 1804 were to be destroyed, while cities and forts from which the Ottomans had been expelled over the course of the uprising were to be reoccupied and garrisoned by Ottoman troops. In exchange, the Ottomans agreed to declare a general amnesty for former rebels, as well as to grant the Serbs of the Pashalik of Belgrade some degree of autonomy. As part of the agreement, the Russians agreed to withdraw their forces from Serbia, as well as from Wallachia and Moldavia. The Russians encouraged Karađorđe and his followers to negotiate directly with the Porte regarding the minutiae of the handover of cities and fortifications to the Ottomans. Trepidation filled the rebel camp once it became clear that there was nothing to prevent the Ottomans from exacting reprisals against the Pashalik's Serb population after the Russians withdrew. Karađorđe thus refused to abide by the terms of the Treaty of Bucharest and fighting continued.

Deprived of foreign assistance, the rebels were quickly routed by the Ottomans, whose units were manned primarily by Albanians and Bosnian Muslims. In early October, Karađorđe fled to the Austrian Empire. He was joined by around 100,000 other Serbs fleeing the Ottoman advance, including 50,000 from Belgrade and its environs alone. Belgrade fell later that month. The city's fall marked the end of the First Serbian Uprising. The Ottomans singled out men and boys over the age of 15 for execution, and sold women and children into slavery. Torture was used extensively and executions were particularly brutal. "Men were roasted alive, hanged by their feet over smoking straw until they asphyxiated, castrated, crushed with stones, and bastinadoed," one eyewitness wrote. "Their women and children were raped and sometimes taken by force to harems. Outside Stambul Gate in Belgrade, there were always on view the corpses of impaled Serbs being gnawed by packs of dogs." Another account relays how infants and toddlers were boiled alive. In one day alone, 1,800 women and children were sold into slavery at a Belgrade market. Churches across the city were destroyed and mosques that had been converted into churches following the city's capture in 1806 were returned to their original use. Others were deliberately torched by the Ottomans for the purpose of inflicting suffering on the city's inhabitants. In one instance, several dozen Serb refugees seeking shelter in a mosque were burned alive inside.

In late October 1813, Hurshid Pasha declared a general amnesty for the rebels that had survived, though Karađorđe and some senior Orthodox clerics were specifically exempted. Many rebel leaders agreed to lay down their arms, the most notable of these being Miloš Obrenović, the rebel commander in Užice. A large number of Serb refugees subsequently returned to their homes, as did many of the Muslims that had been displaced in the fighting.

== Exile, return to Serbia and assassination ==
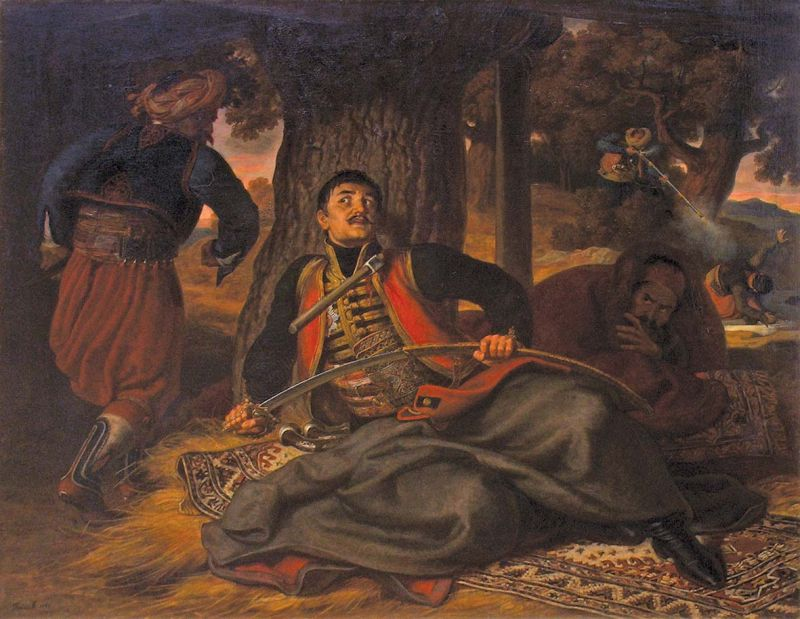
The Assassination of Karadjordje, Mór Than (1863), National Museum of Serbia

Upon crossing the Danube, Karađorđe and his followers were arrested by the Austrian authorities. They were initially detained at the Petrovaradin Fortress in Novi Sad and later transferred to a prison in Graz. The Ottomans demanded that Karađorđe and the other rebel leaders be extradited to face punishment. The Austrians refused and instead turned them over to the Russians. Karađorđe spent a year in Austrian custody before being allowed to go to Russia. Like many of the other rebel leaders, he settled in Bessarabia. He attempted to adjust to civilian life, commissioning a portrait of himself by the painter Vladimir Borovikovsky. In April 1815, Obrenović orchestrated another anti-Ottoman rebellion in Serbia, which came to be known as the Second Serbian Uprising. Unlike Karađorđe's revolt, the Second Serbian Uprising ended relatively quickly and resulted in a rebel victory. In November 1815, the Ottomans accepted Obrenović's demands for wide-ranging autonomy. The terms that they agreed to were identical to those rejected by Karađorđe in 1807.

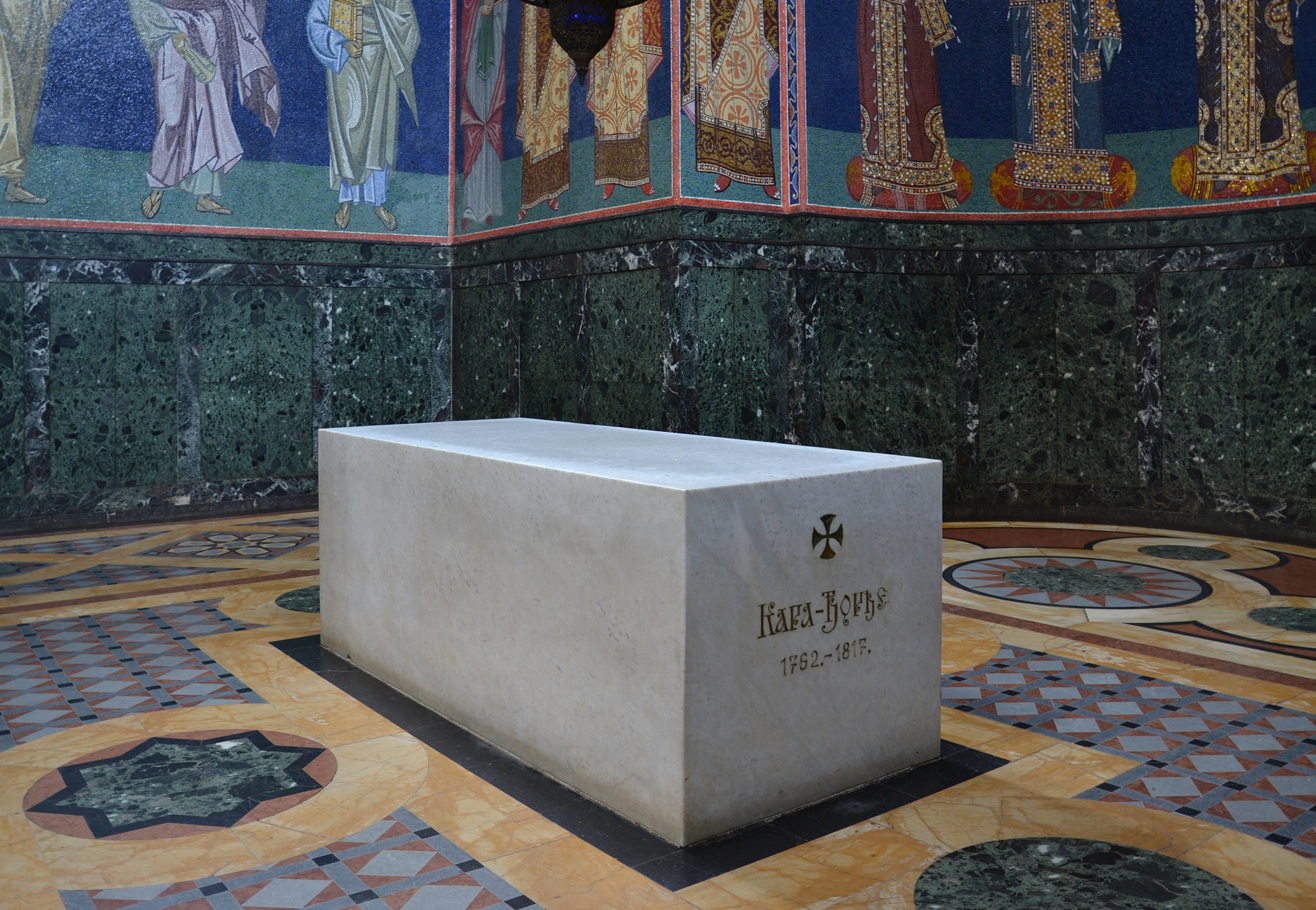
Karađorđe's sarcophagus in the Church of Saint George, Topola

The Russians prohibited Karađorđe from returning to the Balkans to take part in the Second Serbian Uprising. Karađorđe objected and traveled to Saint Petersburg to plead his case, but was arrested and detained. Upon his release, he joined the Filiki Eteria, a Greek nationalist secret society that intended to launch a pan-Balkan uprising against the Ottomans. The Filiki Eteria promised Karađorđe a position of military leadership in the planned uprising and offered to smuggle him into the Pashalik of Belgrade. Karađorđe secretly entered the Pashalik on 24 July [O.S. 12 July] 1817, crossing the Danube together with his servant, Naum Krnar. He then contacted his kum, Vujica Vulićević, who offered him an abode in the oak forest of Radovanje Grove, near Velika Plana. Unbeknownst to Karađorđe, Vulićević was on Obrenović's payroll. After escorting Karađorđe and his servant to a tent in the forest, Vulićević informed Obrenović of Karađorđe's whereabouts through a courier. Shortly thereafter, he received a letter from Obrenović telling him that Karađorde was to be killed. Vulićević enlisted one of his close confidantes, Nikola Novaković, to take Karađorđe's life. The following morning, just before sunrise, Novaković snuck into Karađorđe's tent and axed him to death while he slept. He then went to the riverside and shot Krnar with a rifle as he was gathering water. Karađorđe's lifeless body was beheaded. His severed head was taken to Belgrade and presented to Marashli Ali Pasha, who had been appointed the governor of the Pashalik two years prior. Ali Pasha had the head flayed, stuffed and sent to the Sultan himself.

Obrenović feared that Karađorđe's return would prompt the Ottomans to renege on the agreement reached by the Porte and Obrenović's followers in November 1815. By extension, Karađorđe's murder precluded the Serbs of the Pashalik from taking part in the Balkan-wide rebellion that the Filiki Eteria had been planning. In Constantinople, Karađorđe's head was impaled on a stake and left on public display for a week. His body was buried on Serbian soil, but his skull ended up in the hands of a Constantinople museum. It was stolen some years later and buried in Greece.

== Legacy ==
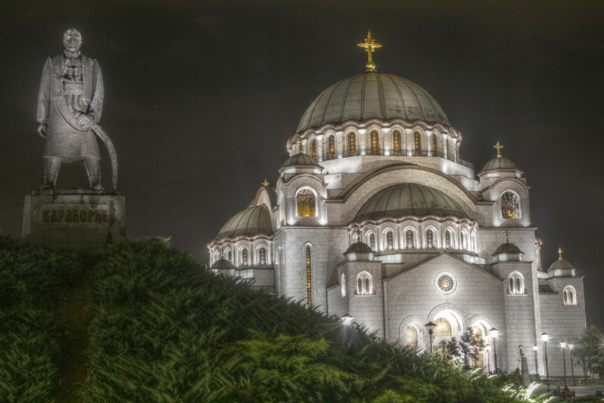
Karađorđe's statue in front of the Church of Saint Sava

Karađorđe's descendants adopted the surname Karađorđević in his honour. His murder resulted in a violent, decades-long feud between his descendants and those of Obrenović, with the Serbian throne changing hands several times. The feud came to an abrupt end in June 1903, when rebellious Royal Serbian Army officers killed the Obrenović king, Alexander, and his wife, Queen Draga, thereby rendering the Obrenović line extinct. Karađorđe's grandson, Peter Karađorđević, then ascended the throne.

In order to tie himself to his grandfather's legacy, Peter commissioned a bronze crown cast from a piece of Karađorđe's first cannon. In addition, the Order of Karađorđe's Star was introduced as Serbia's highest state decoration. The first feature-length film to emerge from Serbia and the Balkans, whose plot revolves around Karađorđe and his actions before, during and after the First Serbian Uprising, was released in 1911. Work soon began on the construction of the Church of Saint George, a Karađorđević dynasty mausoleum at Oplenac, near Topola. In 1913, a monument to Karađorđe was unveiled at Kalemegdan Park. During the Austro-Hungarian occupation of Serbia, the monument was torn down by the Austro-Hungarian Army and destroyed.

In November 1918, Peter ascended the throne of the newly established Kingdom of Serbs, Croats and Slovenes, which was later renamed Yugoslavia. Karađorđe's head was repatriated from Greece in 1923 and reunited with the rest of his body. His remains were buried in a white marble sarcophagus within the church in 1930. The Karađorđević dynasty ruled Yugoslavia until 1941, when its members were forced into exile by Germany's invasion and occupation of the country. The monarchy was abolished by Josip Broz Tito's communist government in 1945.

Misha Glenny, a journalist specializing in the Balkans, believes that the First Serbian Uprising "marked the beginning of modern history on the Balkan peninsula." The uprising kindled the flame of ethno-religious nationalism among the Christians of Southeastern Europe and inspired the subsequent Greek War of Independence. Karađorđe's struggle against the Ottomans also had an important influence on the Bosnian Muslim revolutionary Husein Gradaščević, who instigated the Great Bosnian Uprising. Karađorđe is viewed in a negative light by some modern Bosniaks. In 2011, the chief Mufti of the Islamic Community of Serbia, Muamer Zukorlić, filed a petition to rename a street in Sjenica named after Karađorđe. Zukorlić alleged that Karađorđe and his followers had indiscriminately targeted the town's residents in 1809, a notion disputed by Serbian historians. The historian Ivo Banac surmises that "there would be no Bosnian Muslims today" had Karađorđe extended his uprising west of the Drina.

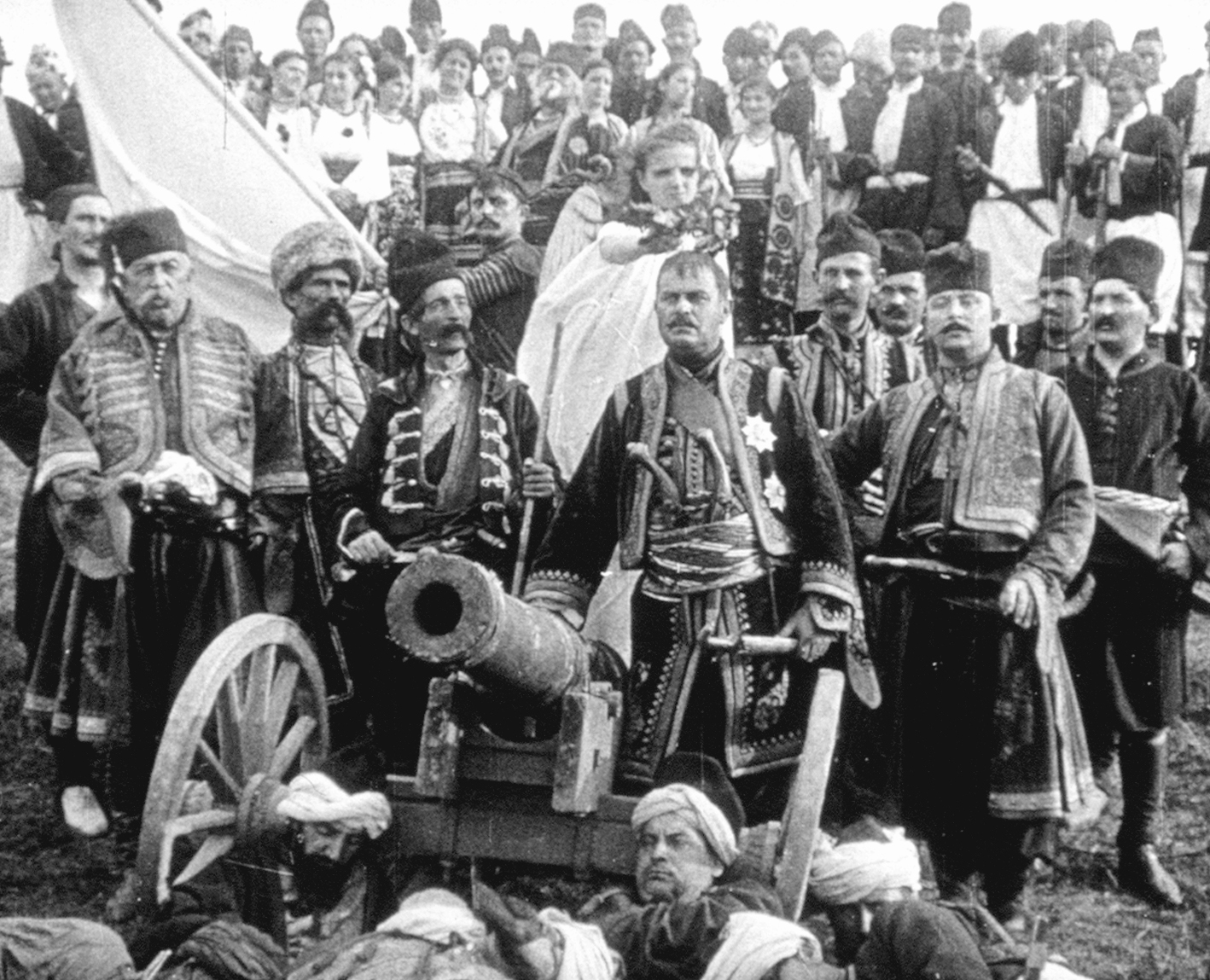
The Life and Deeds of the Immortal Leader Karađorđe was the first feature film released in the Balkans.

Karađorđe's exploits were popularized across Europe by the linguist and folklorist Vuk Karadžić, who recorded and published the ballads of the blind gusle player and epic poet Filip Višnjić, many of which pertained to the First Serbian Uprising. Karađorđe is referenced in a number of works of 19th-century fiction. While he was still alive, the Hungarian dramatist István Balog wrote a stage play about him, titled Black George, which premiered in August 1812. Several years later, the Russian poet Alexander Pushkin penned a ballad about Karađorđe titled The Song of George the Black. The Irish poet George Croly also wrote a ballad about him. Karađorđe is mentioned in Honoré de Balzac's 1842 novel A Start in Life, as the grandfather of one of the book's main characters. The Montenegrin prince-bishop and poet Petar II Petrović-Njegoš dedicated his 1847 epic poem The Mountain Wreath to "the ashes of the Father of Serbia", a reference to Karađorđe. The surname Karamazov, used in the Russian writer Fyodor Dostoyevsky's 1880 novel The Brothers Karamazov, is believed to have partially been inspired by Karađorđe, whose exploits popularized the use of the prefix "kara" to mean "black" within Russia.

Karađorđe's likeness was featured on the obverse of five-million dinar banknotes issued by the National Bank of Yugoslavia in 1993 and 1994. The anniversary of the First Serbian Uprising's commencement, 15 February, is celebrated annually in Serbia as Statehood Day. A monument to Karađorđe stands in front of Belgrade's Church of Saint Sava, within the eponymous Karađorđe's Park. The home ground of the Novi Sad football team FK Vojvodina has been named the Karađorđe Stadium since the venue's opening in 1924.

== Descendants ==
Karađorđe b. 1768 – d. 1817 reigned 1804–1813
Alexis b. 1801 – d. 1830	Alexander Karađorđević b. 1806 – d. 1885 reigned 1842–1858
George b. 1827 – d. 1884	Peter I b. 1844 – d. 1921 reigned 1903–1921	Arsen b. 1859 – d. 1938
Alexis b. 1859 – d. 1920	Bojidar b. 1862 – d. 1908	George b. 1887 – d. 1972	Alexander I b. 1888 – d. 1934 reigned 1921–1934	Paul Karađorđević b. 1893 – d. 1976 ruled 1934–1941 (as prince regent)
Peter II b. 1923 – d. 1970 reigned 1934–1945	Tomislav b. 1928 – d. 2000	Andrew b. 1929 – d. 1990	Alexander b. 1924 – d. 2016	Nicholas b. 1928 – d. 1954
Alexander Karađorđević b. 1945	Nicholas b. 1958; George b. 1984; Michael b. 1985	Karl Vladimir b. 1964; Dimitri Mihailo b. 1965	Dimitri b. 1958	Michael b. 1958	Sergius b. 1963	Dušan b. 1977
Peter b. 1980	Philip b. 1982	Alexander b. 1982
Stefan b. 2018

== See also ==
- List of Serbian Revolutionaries

== Citations ==
Karađorđe Karađorđević Born: 14 November 1762 Died: 25 July 1817
Regnal titles
Preceded by Title created	Grand Vožd of Serbia; 14 February 1804 – 3 October 1813	Succeeded by Miloš Obrenović I as Prince of Serbia
Political offices
Preceded by Jakov Nenadović	President of the Administering Council; 22 January 1811 – 3 October 1813	Succeeded by Petar Nikolajević Moler
