= Runcu Mare =

Runcu Mare may refer to several villages in Romania:

- Runcu Mare, a village in Lelese Commune, Hunedoara County
- Runcu Mare, a village in Grădinari Commune, Olt County
