= Josani =

Josani may refer to several villages in Romania:

- Josani, a village in Căbești Commune, Bihor County
- Josani, a village in Măgești Commune, Bihor County
- Josani, a village in Pestișu Mic Commune, Hunedoara County
