= Hafiz Halil Mripa's tekke =

Cultural heritage monument of Kosovo

- Teqja e Hafiz Halil Mripës (Albanian)
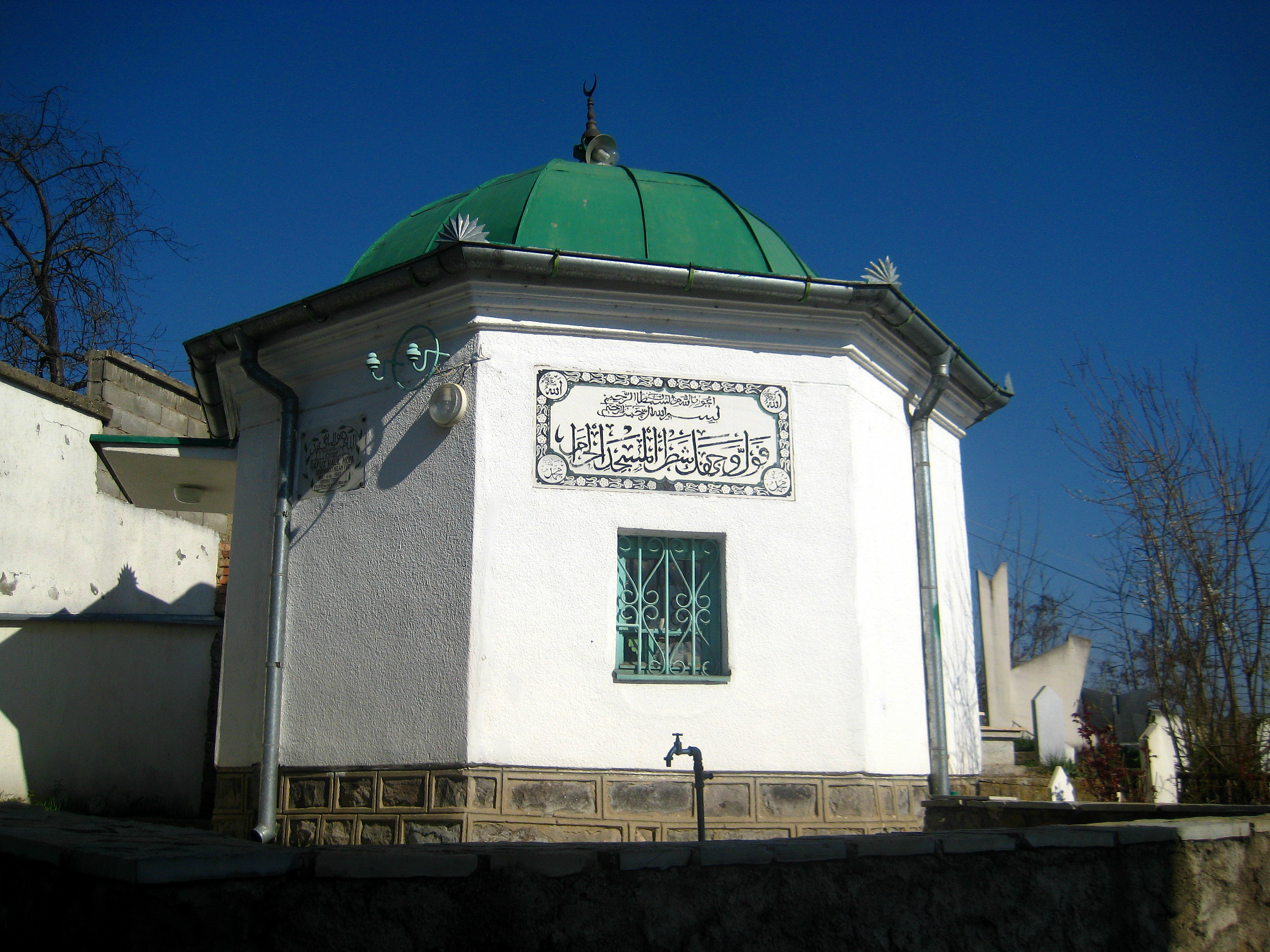
- Location: Suhodoll i Poshtëm, Mitrovica, Kosovo

History
- Built: 1967

The Hafiz Halil Mripa's tekke (Albanian: Teqja e Hafiz Halil Mripës) is a Melami tariqah in Suhodoll i Poshtëm, Mitrovica, Kosovo. It was burnt by the Serbian forces in the Kosovo War, but it was rebuilt by the local Albanian community after the war.

== See also ==
- Suhodoll i Poshtëm
