= Lelesz =

Lelesz is the Hungarian name for two places, one in Romania and one in Slovakia:

- Lelese Commune, Hunedoara County, Romania
- Leles village, Košice Region, Slovakia
