= Gurbești =

Gurbeşti may refer to several villages in Romania:

- Gurbeşti, a village in Căbești Commune, Bihor County
- Gurbeşti, a village in Spinuș Commune, Bihor County
