= Mitrovica Lake =

Artificial lake in Kosovo

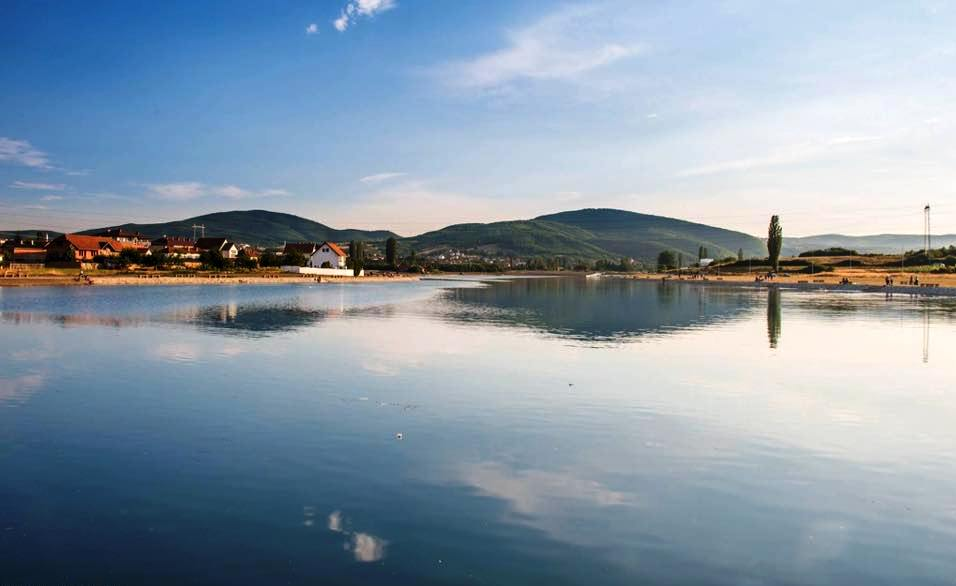
- Mitrovica Lake

- Location within Kosovo Location within Europe
- Interactive map of Mitrovica Lake
- Location: Mitrovica, Kosovo
- Coordinates: 42°52′50″N 20°50′46″E
- Primary inflows: Ibar River
- Basin countries: Kosovo
- Built: 2017
- Max. length: 1.8 km (1.1 mi)
- Max. width: 150 m (490 ft)
- Surface area: 1.82 km^{2} (0.70 sq mi)
- Average depth: 4 m (13 ft)
- Surface elevation: 506 m (1,660 ft)

Mitrovica Lake (Albanian: Liqeni i Mitrovicës) is an artificial lake located near the city of Mitrovica, Kosovo.

== History ==
The idea of building an artificial lake in the course of the river Ibër near the city of Mitrovica has existed for a long time, but only in 2012 the Municipality of Mitrovica in cooperation with the Ministry of Local Government decided to build it.

The work on the construction of Mitrovica Lake began in 2013 while its finalization took place in 2017 with a donation from the European Union. Mitrovica Lake is about 1.8 kilometers long, up to 150 meters wide, and up to 4 meters deep. Lake lies in the space along the course of the river Ibër, between Mitrovica and the villages: Suhodoll i Poshtëm, Suhodolli i Epërm, Zhabar i Poshtëm, and up to Gushac and Vinarc i Poshtëm.

== Gallery ==
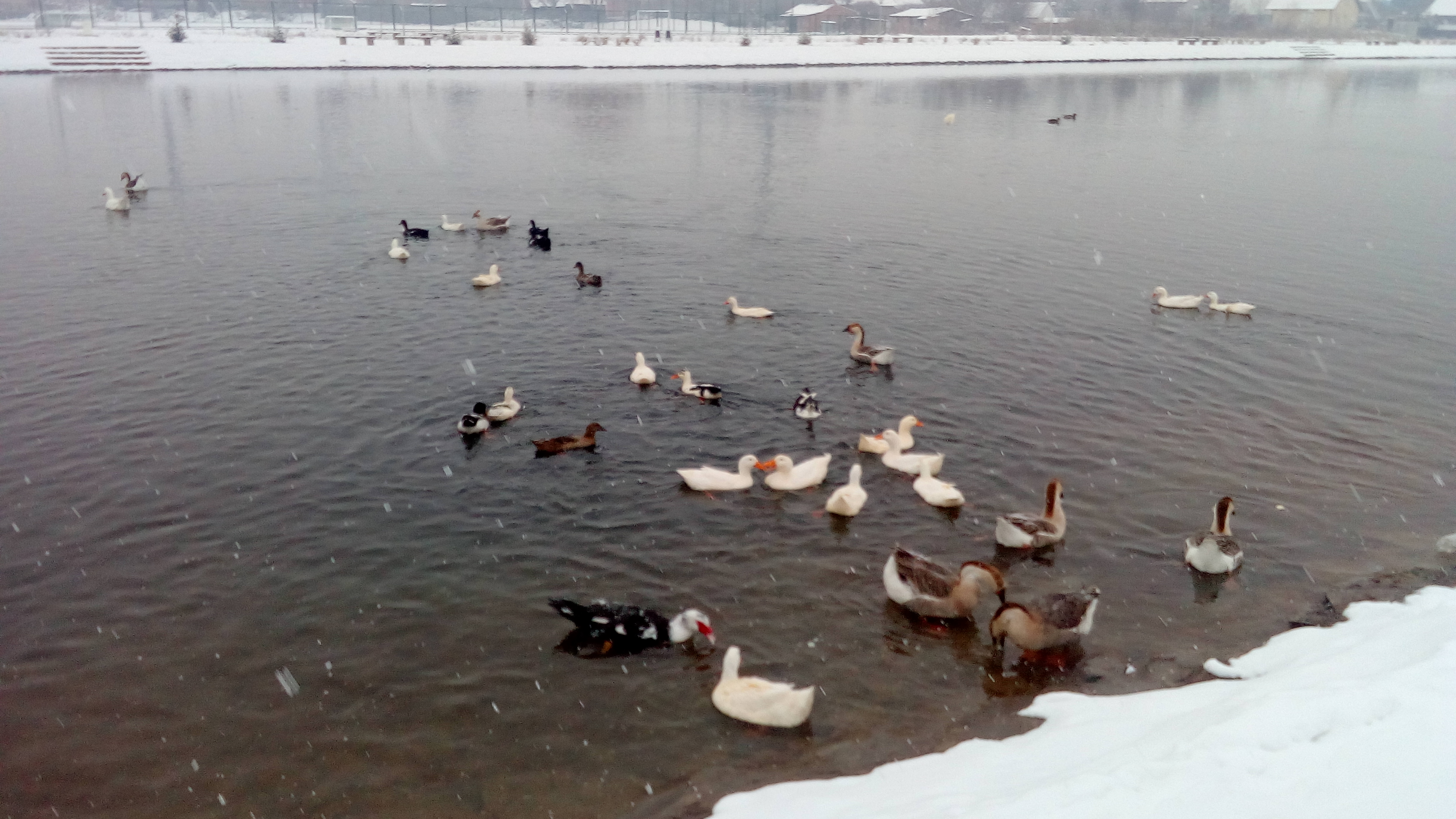

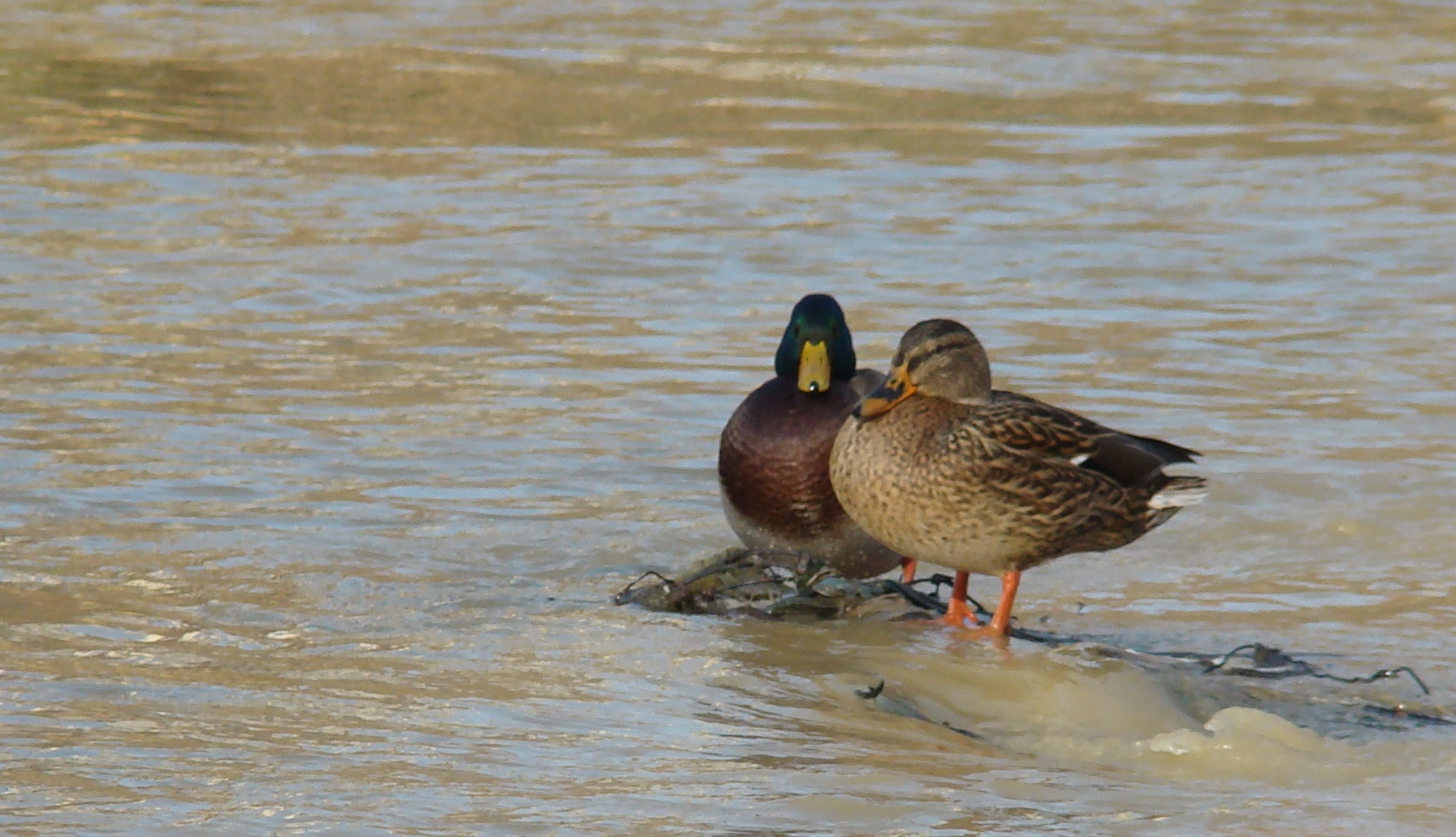

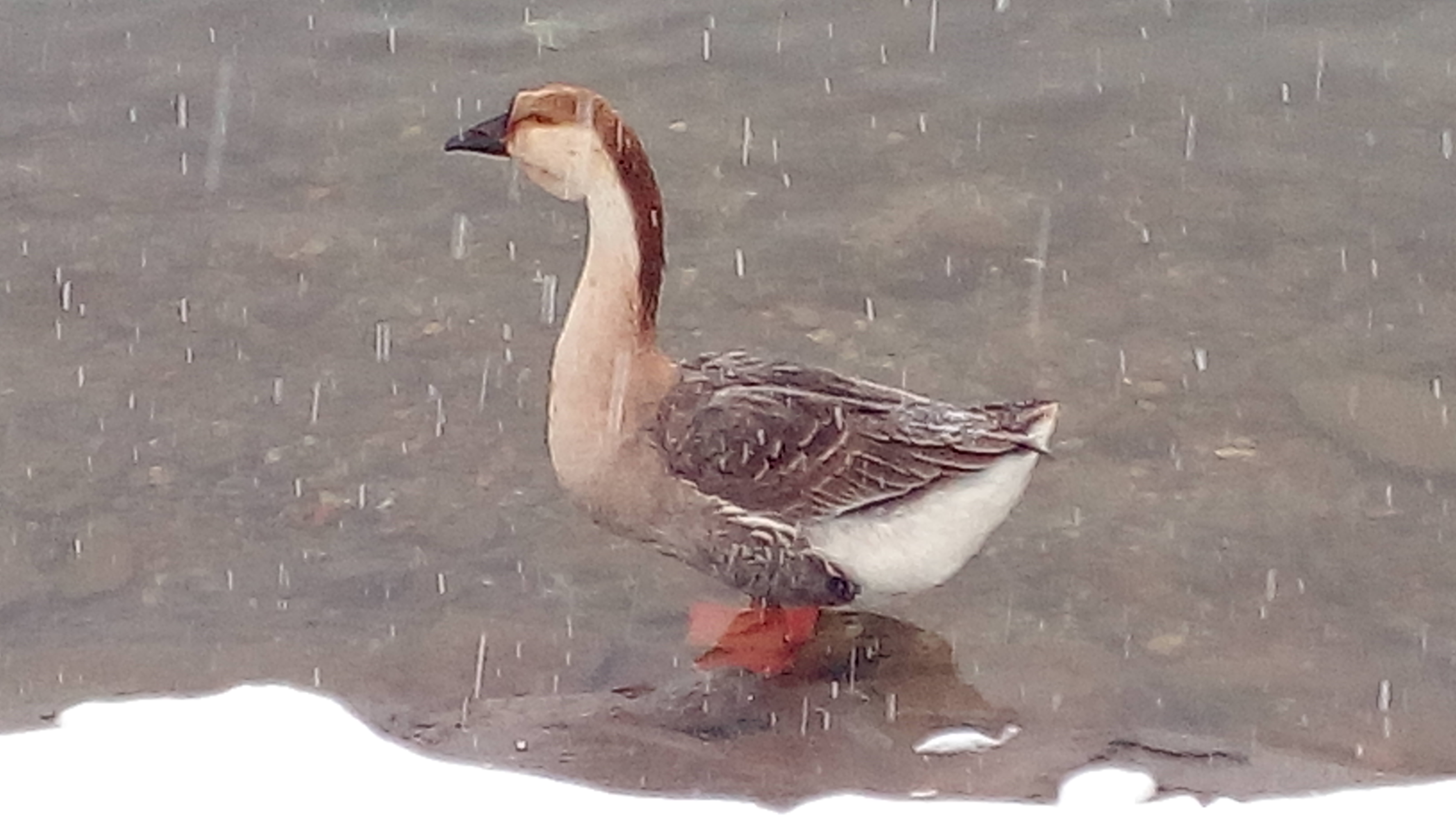

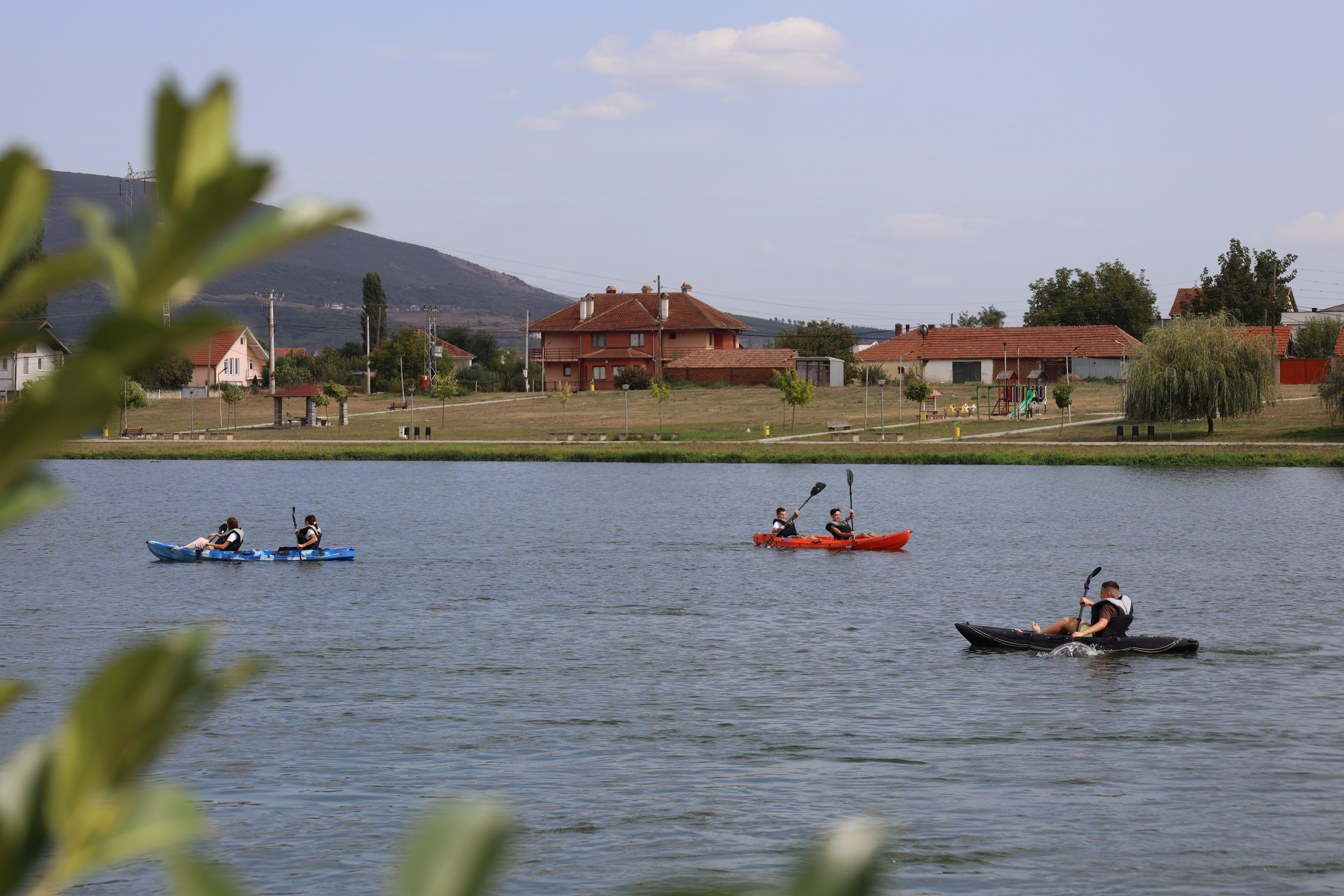

== See also ==
- List of lakes of Kosovo
- Ibar River
- Mitrovica, Kosovo
- District of Mitrovica
