= Viševac =

Viševac Вишевац
- Village
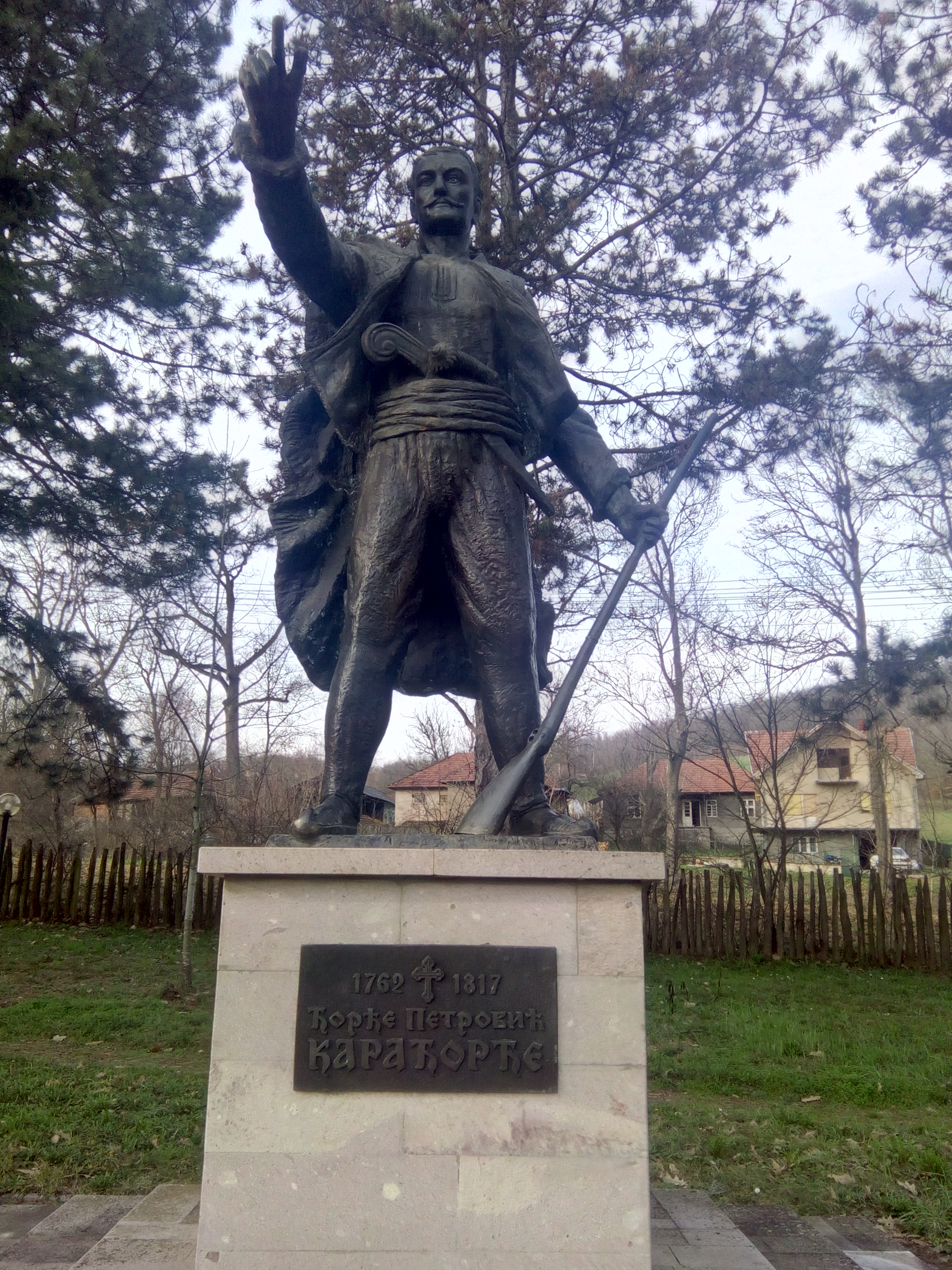

- Location within Serbia
- Coordinates: 44°15′16″N 20°55′16″E
- Country: Serbia
- District: Šumadija District
- Municipality: Rača

Population (2002)
  - Total: 700
- Time zone: UTC+1 (CET)
  - Summer (DST): UTC+2 (CEST)

Viševac (Serbian Cyrillic: Вишевац) is a village in the municipality of Rača, Serbia. According to the 2002 census, the village has a population of 700 people. Karađorđe was born in the village.
