= Vinarc i Poshtëm =

Vinarc i Poshtëm Donje Vinarce
- Village
- Location in Kosovo
- Coordinates: 42°52′25″N 20°48′47″E
- Location: Kosovo
- District: Mitrovicë
- Municipality: Mitrovicë
- Elevation: 515 m (1,690 ft)

Population (2024)
  - Total: 882
- Time zone: UTC+1 (CET)
  - Summer (DST): UTC+2 (CEST)

Vinarc i Poshtëm (in Albanian) or Donje Vinarce (in Serbian: Доње Винарце) is a village in the municipality of Mitrovica in the District of Mitrovica, Kosovo. According to the 2024 census, it has 882 inhabitants.

== Demography ==
According to the 2024 census, the village has in total 882 inhabitants, from whom 880 were Albanians and 2 Bosniaks.

== Notable Locations ==
- Mitrovica Lake
- Olympic Stadium Adem Jashari
