= Suhodol =

Suhodol may refer to:

- Sukhodol (disambiguation), several places in Russia
- Suhodol, Donji Vakuf, a village in Bosnia and Herzegovina
- Suhodol, Burgas Province, a village in Burgas Province, Bulgaria
- Suhodol, Silistra Province, a village in Glavinitsa Municipality, Silistra Province, Bulgaria
- Suhodol, Sofia, a neighbourhood of Sofia, Bulgaria

== See also ==
- Suhodol Zelinski, a settlement in Croatia
- Banski Suhodol, a mountain peak in Bulgaria
- Suchodol (disambiguation), places in Poland and Czechia
- Suhi Dol (disambiguation)
- Suhindol, a town in Veliko Tarnovo Province, Bulgaria
- Suvodol, several places in Serbia and North Macedonia
