= Battle of Suvodol =

1809 battle of the First Serbian Uprising

- Part of the First Serbian Uprising
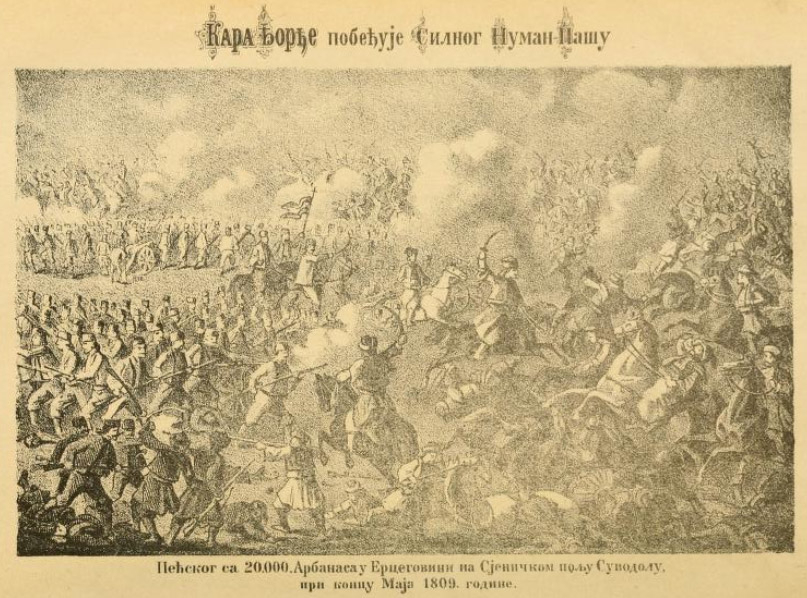
- Battle of Suvodol, lithography
Date	10 June 1809
Location	Suvi Do (Tutin), Sanjak of Smederevo, Ottoman Empire (today Serbia)
Result	Serbian victory

Belligerents
Revolutionary Serbia	Ottoman Empire

Commanders and leaders
Karađorđe Petrović; Vule Ilić Kolarac	(Ottoman Empire) Numan-Beg Mahmudbegović

Units involved
(Revolutionary Serbia) First Serbian Army	(Ottoman Empire) Ottoman Army

Strength
4,000 men including cavalry, 2 guns	6,000 men

Casualties and losses
100–120 killed	~ 600 killed

The Battle of Suvodol was fought near Sjenica between the Serbian rebels under Karađorđe Petrović and an Ottoman army under Numan-Beg Mahmudbegović in late May 1809, during the First Serbian uprising. It resulted in a Serbian victory.

== Prelude ==
In the spring of 1809, during the Russo-Turkish War (1806–12), the Serbs took up arms once again, and begun directing attacks on Serb-inhabited territories outwards of the former Sanjak of Smederevo. Prior to the Battle of Suvodol, Karađorđe and his forces, which numbered 4,000 men, liberated Nova Varoš and Sjenica and moved onwards towards the river Lim. On 9 June, wary of Numan-Beg Mahmudbegović's Ottoman forces that were already based in the Suvi Do area, Karađorđe's forces moved onwards from the river Lim towards Suvi Do. Karađorđe's march southwards through rugged terrain covered 110 kilometres in seven days leading up to the battle.

Expecting the arrival of the revolutionaries, the Ottoman forces under Numan-Beg, which consisted mainly of Albanians and numbered to 6,000 men, began to set up trenches on the hills surrounding Suvi Do. From this vantage point, the forces under Numan-Beg's command had a view of the plains below and from a strategic point of view; this was a convenient position to be in. However, thanks to the dense forest below and the morning fog, Karađorđe's forces were able to sneak up to the Ottoman trenches without being detected.

== Battle ==
The battle took place the very next day, on the 10th of June. The first attack on the trenches was ferocious; Karađorđe's forces were able to take positions early on, but due to the weaknesses of the Serbian forces (such fatigue from the previous night's march), Numan-Beg forces had a strong advantage early on in repelling the attack and quickly suppressed the Serbian troops. Numan-Beg was aware of his initial advantage and tried to capitalize on it. Numan-Beg ordered a counter-attack against the revolutionaries and forced the Serbian forces back to their cannon lines. Karađorđe arranged his threatened force into an infantry square formation, a highly effective tactic of the Napoleonic Era which provided good defence from cavalry charges. This move saved his troops and allowed them to continue the battle.

However, after 3 hours of intense combat and with defeat in sight, the Serbian cavalry - under the command of Vojvoda Vule Ilić Kolarac - attacked one of the unprotected Ottoman wings with such force and surprise that it threw the Ottoman forces in disarray as the cavalry began to flank them. Ottoman forces attempted to regroup and attack the revolutionaries; however, they were met with fierce gunfire from the Serbian cannons and infantry. In the midst of the fighting and poor visibility due to the fog, Vojvoda Vule Ilic Kolarac began to yell out in Turkish "our forces have retreated" to fool the Ottomans into retreating. This ploy threw Numan-Beg's forces into even more disarray. Battered by relentless attacks, the injured Numan-Beg and his forces retreated.

The retreating Ottoman forces tried to regroup and ambush revolutionaries who were chasing after them. However, they were pushed further into rocky canyons where the Serbian revolutionaries began to shower them with large boulders that were abundant in the area. Those who survived the onslaught retreated towards Peja and Novi Pazar.

== Sources ==
- "The Impact of the First Serbian Uprising on Bosniaks in Sandzak". bosnjaci.rs (in Serbian). 3 March 2021.
- Morison, W. A. (1942). The Revolt of the Serbs Against the Turks 1804–1913. Cambridge University Press. GGKEY:BRSF4PUC0LU.
- Mušović, E (1964). The Battle of Suvodol (in Serbian). Naša prošlost. Archived from the original on 19 August 2018.
