= Suhindol Municipality =

Suhindol Municipality Община Сухиндол
- Municipality
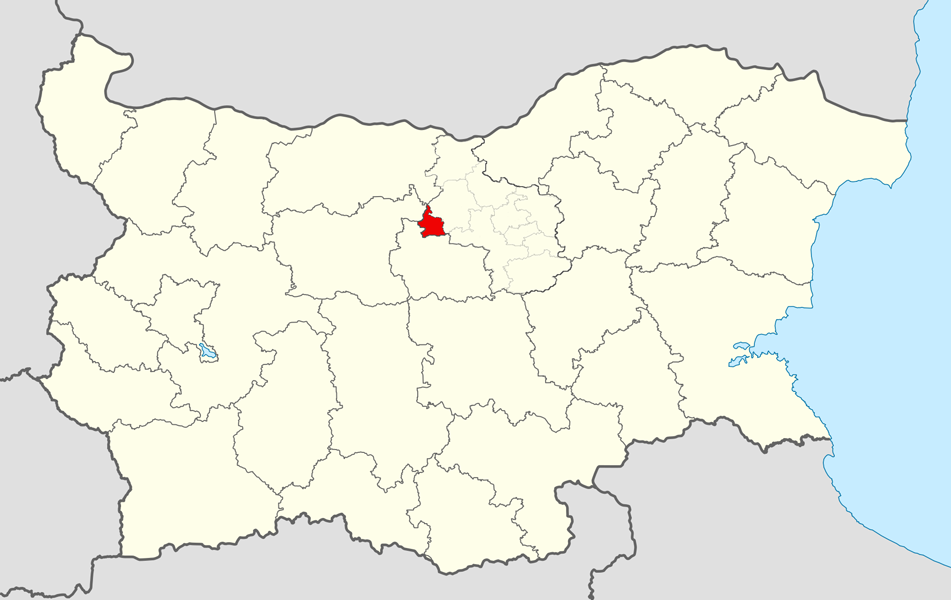
- Suhindol Municipality within Bulgaria and Veliko Tarnovo Province.
- Coordinates: 43°10′N 25°11′E
- Country: Bulgaria
- Province (Oblast): Veliko Tarnovo
- Admin. centre (Obshtinski tsentar): Suhindol

Area
  - Total: 157.55 km^{2} (60.83 sq mi)

Population (December 2009)
  - Total: 3,046
  - Density: 19.33/km^{2} (50.07/sq mi)
- Time zone: UTC+2 (EET)
  - Summer (DST): UTC+3 (EEST)

Suhindol Municipality (Bulgarian: Община Сухиндол) is a small municipality (obshtina) in Veliko Tarnovo Province, central-north Bulgaria, located in the transition between the Danubian Plain and the area of the so-called Fore-Balkan. It is named after its administrative centre – the town of Suhindol.

The municipality embraces a territory of 157.55 km^{2} (60.83 sq mi) with a population of 3,046, as of December 2009.

The Hemus motorway is planned to cross the area connecting the capital city of Sofia with the port of Varna on the Bulgarian Black Sea Coast.

== Settlements ==
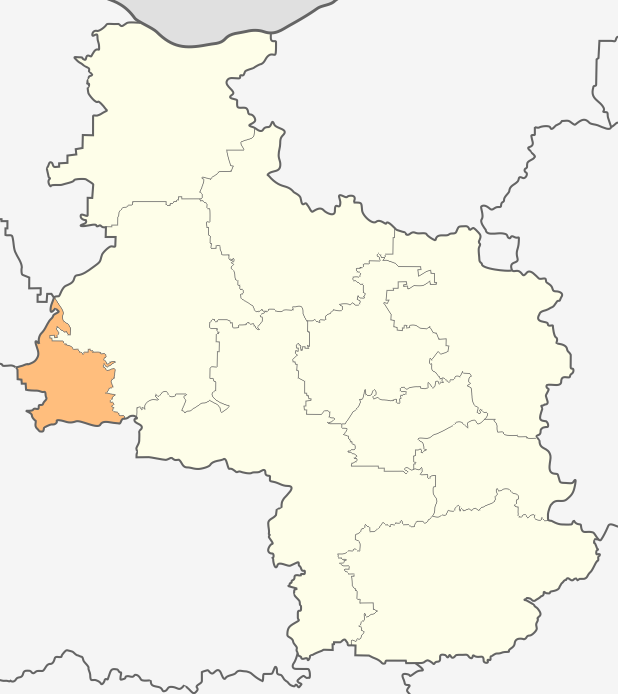
Suhindol Municipality within Veliko Tarnovo Province

Suhindol Municipality includes the following 6 places (towns are shown in bold):

Town/Village	Cyrillic	Population (December 2009)
**Suhindol**	**Сухиндол**	2,146
Byala Reka	Бяла река	252
Gorsko Kalugerovo	Горско Калугерово	171
Gorsko Kosovo	Горско Косово	166
Koevtsi	Коевци	194
Krasno Gradishte	Красно градище	117
Total		3,046

== Demography ==
The following table shows the change of the population during the last four decades.

Suhindol Municipality
**Year**	1975	1985	1992	**2001**	2005	2007	2009	**2011**
**Population**	5,470	4,222	3,912	3,630	3,332	3,178	3,046	...
Sources: Census 2001, Census 2011, „pop-stat.mashke.org“,

=== Vital statistics ===
The municipality of Suhindol has a low birth rate combined with a very high death rate, which makes the natural growth negative.

	Population	Live births	Deaths	Natural growth	Birth rate (‰)	Death rate (‰)	Natural growth rate (‰)
2000	3,739	42	121	−79	11.1	31.9	−20.8
2001	3,520	26	100	−74	7.2	27.6	−20.4
2002	3,537	33	94	−61	9.4	26.6	−17.3
2003	3,420	27	109	−82	7.8	31.3	−23.6
2004	3,351	24	81	−57	7.1	23.9	−16.8
2005	3,332	34	68	−34	10.2	20.4	−10.2
2006	3,248	33	87	−54	10.0	26.4	−16.4
2007	3,178	20	73	−53	6.2	22.7	−16.5
2008	3,100	25	73	−48	8.0	23.3	−15.3
2009	3,046	23	75	−52	7.5	24.4	−16.9
2010	2,967	23	109	−86	7.6	36.2	−28.6
2011	2,513	20	80	−60	7.9	31.6	−23.7
2012	2,460	26	92	−66	10.5	37.0	−26.5
2013	2,434	16	64	−48	6.5	26.2	−19.7
2014	2,389	21	92	−71	8.7	38.1	−29.4
2015	2,444	25	86	−61	10.2	35.2	−25.0
2016	2,374	17	76	−59	7.2	32.0	−24.9
2017	2,316	19	91	−72	8.2	39.3	−31.1
2018	2,255	21	83	−62	9.3	36.8	−27.5

=== Religion ===
According to the latest Bulgarian census of 2011, the religious composition, among those who answered the optional question on religious identification, was the following:

Religious composition of Suhindol Municipality
Orthodox Christianity	51.4%
Catholicism	0.4%
Protestantism	0.0%
Islam	9.2%
No religion	8.8%
Prefer not to answer, others and indefinable	30.2%

== See also ==
- Provinces of Bulgaria
- Municipalities of Bulgaria
- List of cities and towns in Bulgaria
