= Suchodół =

Suchodół or Suchodol may refer to places:

- Suchodol, Czech Republic, a municipality and village
- Suchodół, Lubusz Voivodeship (west Poland)
- Suchodół, Piaseczno County in Masovian Voivodeship (east-central Poland)
- Suchodół, Płock County in Masovian Voivodeship (east-central Poland)
- Suchodół, Sochaczew County in Masovian Voivodeship (east-central Poland)
- Suchodół, Węgrów County in Masovian Voivodeship (east-central Poland)

== See also ==
- Sukhodol (disambiguation), places in Russia
- Suhodol (disambiguation), places in the Balkans
