= Masloševo =

Masloševo Маслошево (Serbian)
- Village
- Location within Serbia
- Coordinates: 44°11′N 20°40′E
- Country: Serbia
- District: Šumadija District
- Municipality: Stragari

Population (2002)
  - Total: 478
- Time zone: UTC+1 (CET)
  - Summer (DST): UTC+2 (CEST)

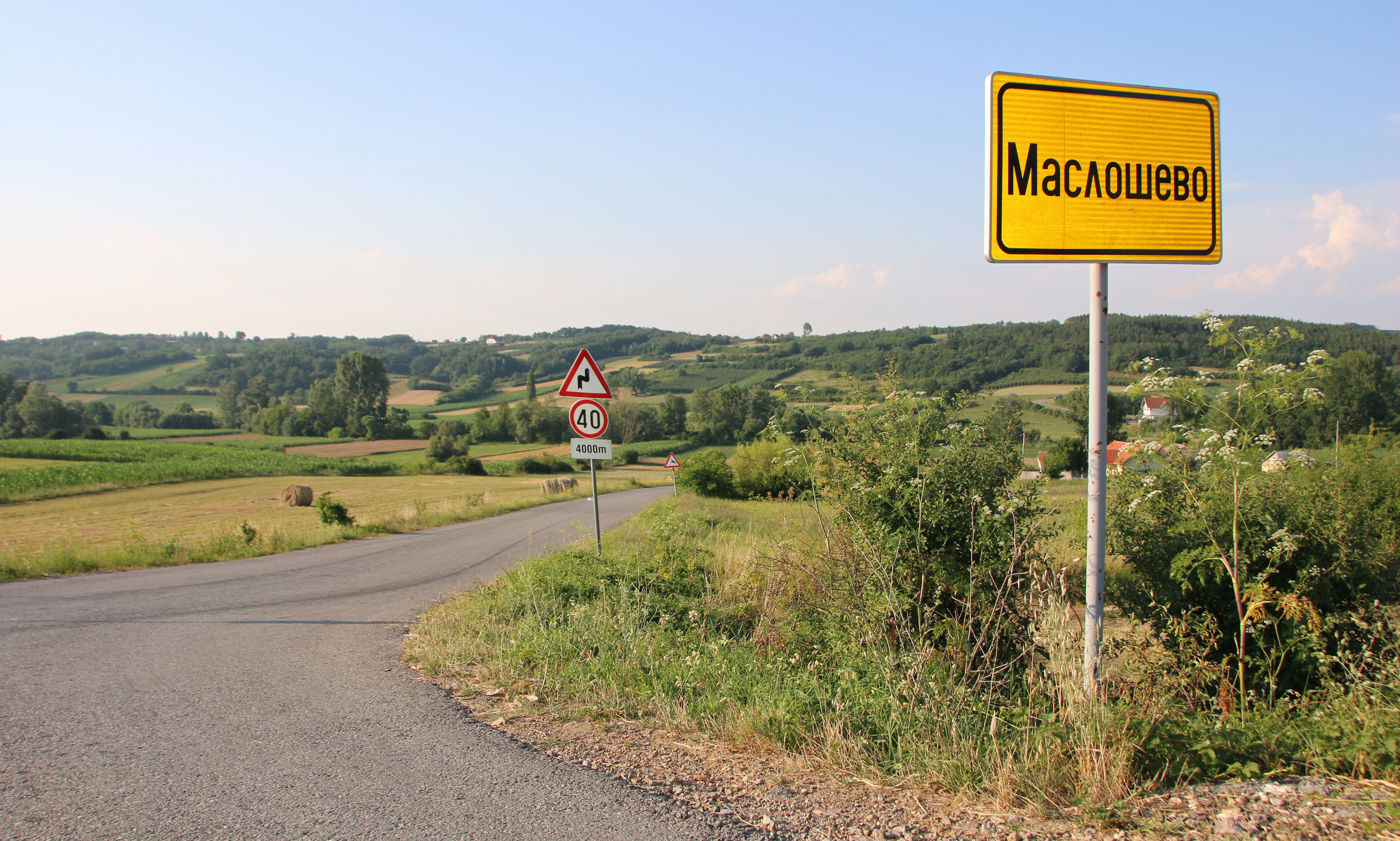
Masloševo

Masloševo (Serbian: Маслошево) is a village in the municipality of Stragari, Serbia. According to the 2002 census, the village has a population of 478 people.
