= Sukhodol, Gafuriysky District, Republic of Bashkortostan =

Sukhodol Суходол
- Village
- Location within Bashkortostan Location within Russia
- Coordinates: 53°56′N 56°36′E
- Country: Russia
- Region: Bashkortostan
- District: Gafuriysky District
- Time zone: UTC+5:00

Sukhodol (Russian: Суходол) is a rural locality (a village) in Tashlinsky Selsoviet, Gafuriysky District, Bashkortostan, Russia. The population was 2 as of 2010. There are 2 streets.

== Geography ==
Sukhodol is located 17 km northeast of Krasnousolsky (the district's administrative centre) by road. Tashla is the nearest rural locality.
