= Suvodol, Makedonski Brod =

Suvodol Суводол
- Village
- Location within North Macedonia
- Coordinates: 41.521134°N 21.238204°E
- Country: North Macedonia
- Region: Southwestern
- Municipality: Makedonski Brod

Population (2002)
  - Total: 207
- Time zone: UTC+1 (CET)
  - Summer (DST): UTC+2 (CEST)

Suvodol (Macedonian: Суводол) is a village in the municipality of Makedonski Brod, North Macedonia.

== Demographics ==
According to the 2002 census, the village had a total of 207 inhabitants. Ethnic groups in the village include:

- Macedonians 207
