= Sukhodol, Vladimir Oblast =

Sukhodol Суходол
- Selo
- Location within Vladimir Oblast Location within Russia
- Coordinates: 56°11′N 40°26′E
- Country: Russia
- Region: Vladimir Oblast
- District: Suzdalsky District
- Time zone: UTC+3:00

Sukhodol (Russian: Суходол) is a rural locality (a selo) in Pavlovskoye Rural Settlement, Suzdalsky District, Vladimir Oblast, Russia. The population was 303 as of 2010. There are 15 streets.

== Geography ==
Sukhodol is located 26 km south of Suzdal (the district's administrative centre) by road. Suromna is the nearest rural locality.
