= Suvodol, Demir Hisar =

Suvodol Суводол
- Village
- Location within North Macedonia
- Coordinates: 41.209760°N 21.222797°E
- Country: North Macedonia
- Region: Pelagonia
- Municipality: Demir Hisar

Population (2002)
  - Total: 415
- Time zone: UTC+1 (CET)
  - Summer (DST): UTC+2 (CEST)
- Website: .

Suvodol (Macedonian: Суводол) is a village in the municipality of Demir Hisar, North Macedonia.

== Demographics ==
In the 1467/1468 defter the village had 23 households, 1 bachelor and 3 widows. The household heads almost entirely bore Slavic names, with a small minority having Albanian names.

In statistics gathered by Vasil Kanchov in 1900, the village of Suvodol was inhabited by 120 Muslim Albanians.

According to the 2002 census, the village had a total of 415 inhabitants. Ethnic groups in the village include:

- Macedonians 369
- Turks 13
- Serbs 1
- Albanians 31
- Others 1
