= Suhodoll i Poshtëm =

Suhodoll i Poshtëm Donji Suvi Do Tejibri i Poshtëm
- Village
- Location in Kosovo
- Coordinates: 42°53′00″N 20°51′00″E
- Location: Kosovo
- District: Mitrovicë
- Municipality: North Mitrovica
- Elevation: 512 m (1,680 ft)

Population (2011)
  - Total: 789
- Time zone: UTC+1 (CET)
  - Summer (DST): UTC+2 (CEST)

Suhodoll i Poshtëm (Albanian: Tejibri i Poshtëm) or Donji Suvi Do (in Serbian) is a village in the municipality of North Mitrovica in the District of Mitrovica, Kosovo. According to the 2011 census, it has 789 inhabitants, of whom 787 are Albanians. It is a village of the scattered type, at 520 to 540 metres (1,710 to 1,770 ft) above sea level, on the left valley side of the Ibar river, southeast of the foot of Rogozna (1,479 m [4,852 ft]). It is located north of the Mitrovica–Ribariće–Podgorica road, one kilometre (0.62 mi) west of Mitrovica. It is part of the cadastral municipality of Suvi Do (422 hectares [1,040 acres]), and is physionomically connected to Suhodolli i Epërm.

== See also ==
- Mitrovica Lake
- Mitrovica, Kosovo

== Sources ==
- Stamenković, Srboljub Đ. (2002). Geografska enciklopedija: naselja Srbije. Geografski fakultet. ISBN 9788682657149.
