= Sukhodol, Volgograd Oblast =

Sukhodol Суходол
- Khutor
- Location within Volgograd Oblast Location within Russia
- Coordinates: 48°37′N 44°53′E
- Country: Russia
- Region: Volgograd Oblast
- District: Sredneakhtubinsky District
- Time zone: UTC+4:00

Sukhodol (Russian: Суходол) is a rural locality (a khutor) and the administrative center of Sukhodolskoye Rural Settlement, Sredneakhtubinsky District, Volgograd Oblast, Russia. The population was 1,334 as of 2010. There are 23 streets.

== Geography ==
Sukhodol is located 14 km southeast of Srednyaya Akhtuba (the district's administrative centre) by road. Shumrovaty is the nearest rural locality.
