= Suhodolli i Epërm =

Suhodoll i Epërm Gornji Suvi Do
- Village
- Location in Kosovo
- Coordinates: 42°53′12″N 20°50′54″E
- Location: Kosovo
- District: Mitrovicë
- Municipality: North Mitrovica
- Elevation: 512 m (1,680 ft)

Population (2011)
  - Total: 224
- Time zone: UTC+1 (CET)
  - Summer (DST): UTC+2 (CEST)

Suhodoll i Epërm (in Albanian) or Gornji Suvi Do (in Serbian: Горњи Суви До) is a village in the municipality of North Mitrovica in the District of Mitrovica, Kosovo. According to the 2011 census, it has 224 inhabitants, all of whom are Albanians.

== See also ==
- Mitrovica Lake
- Mitrovica, Kosovo
