= Suhindol =

Town in Veliko Tarnovo, Bulgaria

Coordinates: 43°11′N 25°11′E

Suhindol (Bulgarian: Сухиндол [ˈsuxindoɫ]) is a town in north central Bulgaria, part of Veliko Tarnovo Province. It is the administrative centre of the homonymous Suhindol Municipality. As of December 2009, the town had a population of 2,146.

Its position in the middle of the Danubian Plain creates excellent conditions for growing wine grapes. The local co-operative "Gamza" is famous for producing wines from the local vine with the same name. In addition, Suhindol winemakers craft Merlot and Cabernet Sauvignon, as well as a local variety "Dimyat". The town's proximity to a large dam on the Rositsa river and to the foothills of the Balkan Mountains make it a favourable tourist destination. The Rositza River near this town is known to hold "som" or European Catfish and some of them reach lengths of over 2 meters, especially the ones that live in the dam Alexandar Stamboliiski.

== History ==
Suhindol is one of the most well-known and wealthiest historical Bulgarian settlements. It is known as Bulgarian Champagne by the lovers of Bacchus. According to archeologists of the Veliko Turnovo's museum, signs of human settlement in the area date to the Neolithic (New Stone) age - approx. 6000 years B.C. They have dated remains of domiciles, captured springs, ceramic fragments, jewelry, household items (hammers, woodworking instruments and bowls) and there is evidence of settlement and activity throughout the centuries. Suhindol has existed as a town for over a century. According to the archaeologist Polichronii Sirku who visited the town in 1878, a wealthy Roman village existed in the vicinity. Folk tales tell that the town is ancient, however, the age it is not established with any certainty. In the area of "Seltze" there are remnants of a settlement dating back to the 2nd century and in the neighborhood of "Drachevo" a medieval fort known as "Diritza" existed. The ancient name of Suhindol was "Seoundal".

== Honour ==
Suhindol Point on Smith Island, South Shetland Islands is named after Suhindol.
