= Suvi Do (Tutin) =

- Village (Selo)
- Location within Serbia
- Coordinates: 43°02′N 20°07′E
- Country: Serbia
- District: Sanjak district
- Municipality: Tutin

Population (2002)
  - Total: 401
- Time zone: UTC+1 (CET)
  - Summer (DST): UTC+2 (CEST)

Suvi Do (Bosnian: Suhodo) is a village in the municipality of Tutin, Serbia. According to the 2002 census, the village has a population of 401 people.
