= Lelese =

- Commune
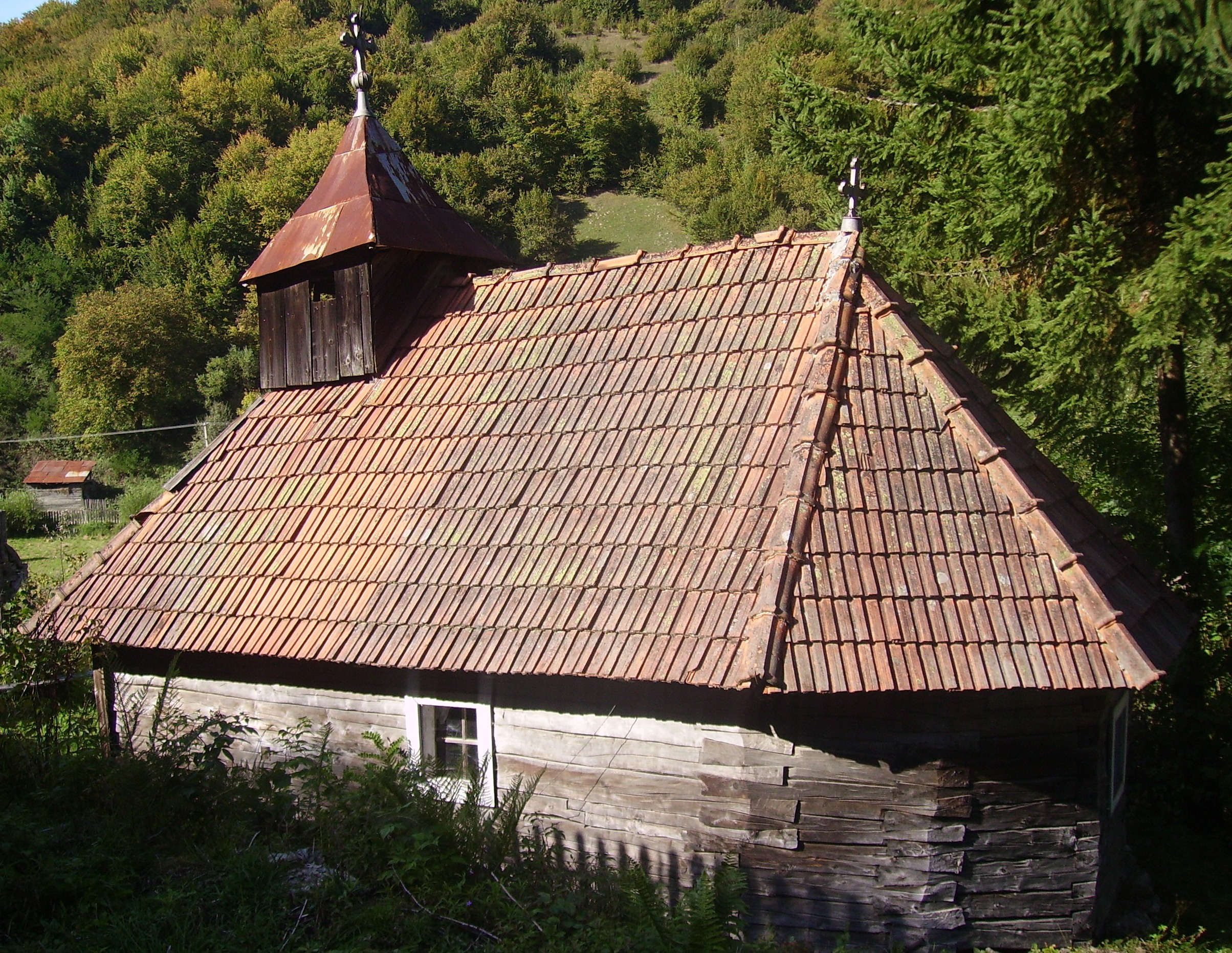
- Wooden church in Runcu Mare

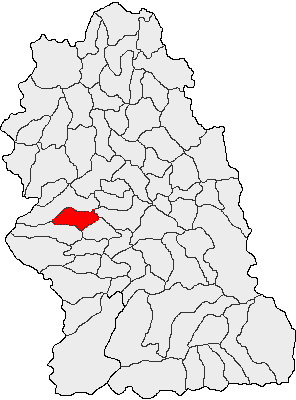
- Location in Hunedoara County

- Location in Romania
- Coordinates: 45°44′N 22°42′E
- Country: Romania
- County: Hunedoara

Government
  - Mayor (2024–2028): Ciprian Gheorghe Achim (PSD)
- Area: 75.81 km^{2} (29.27 sq mi)
- Elevation: 790 m (2,590 ft)
- Population (2021-12-01): 339
  - Density: 4.47/km^{2} (11.6/sq mi)
- Time zone: UTC+02:00 (EET)
  - Summer (DST): UTC+03:00 (EEST)
- Postal code: 337295
- Area code: (+40) 02 54
- Vehicle reg.: HD
- Website: comunalelese.ro

Lelese (Hungarian: Lelesz, German: Lelsdorf) is a commune in Hunedoara County, Transylvania, Romania. It is composed of four villages: Cerișor (Cserisor), Lelese, Runcu Mare (Nagyrunk), and Sohodol (Szohodol).

Historical population
Year	Pop.	±%
1850	1,485	—
1900	1,894	+27.5%
2002	511	−73.0%
2011	406	−20.5%
2021	339	−16.5%
Source: Census data
