= Căbești =

- Commune
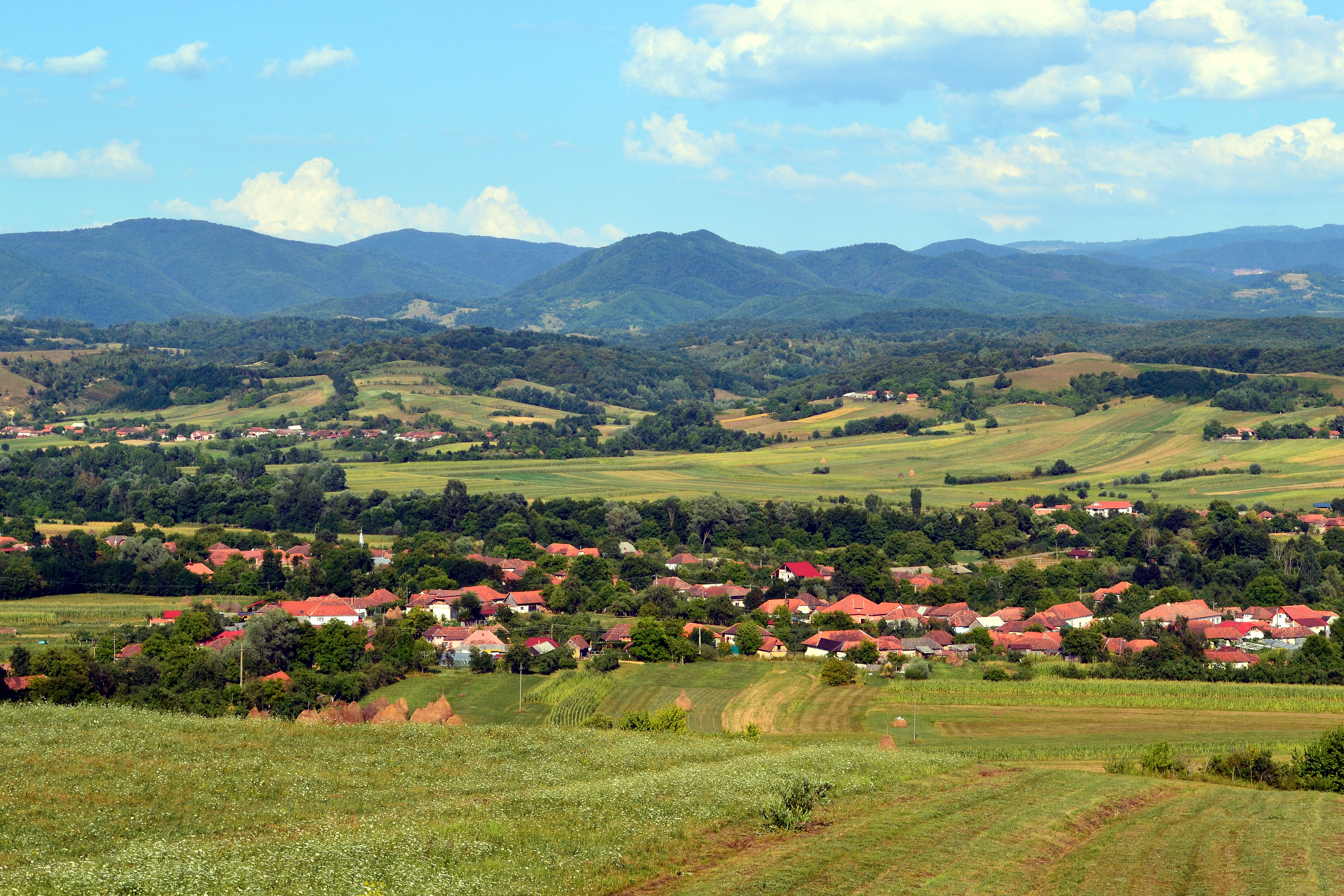

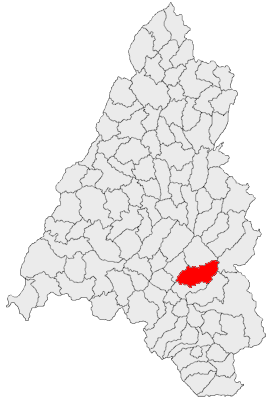
- Location in Bihor County

- Location in Romania
- Coordinates: 46°46′16″N 22°22′30″E
- Country: Romania
- County: Bihor
- Population (2021-12-01): 1,756
- Time zone: UTC+02:00 (EET)
  - Summer (DST): UTC+03:00 (EEST)
- Vehicle reg.: BH

Căbești (Hungarian: Biharkaba) is a commune in Bihor County, Crișana, Romania, around 13 kilometers north of the town of Beiuș.

== Administration ==
The commune is composed of five villages: Căbești (Hungarian: Biharkaba), Goila, Gurbești (Hungarian: Görbesd), Josani (Hungarian: Dzsoszány) and Sohodol (Hungarian: Aszóirtás).

=== Josani ===
The village has a population of about 350 people. The whole population is ethnic Romanian.

The river Valea Roșia flows through the village. The village has very beautiful landscapes, especially during the summer.

=== Gurbești ===
Gurbești is part of the Căbești commune. The river Valea Roșia flows alongside the village.

Almost all the population of the village is ethnic Romanian.

Gurbești has a 300-year-old Orthodox church, one of the oldest churches in the area.

== Education ==
Education in Căbești is composed of:

- kindergarten
- primary school
- secondary school.

== Institutions ==
The commune contains several institutions:

- Town Hall
- Postal Office
- Local Bank Office
- Police Department
- Library
- Primary and Secondary school
- Orthodox Church

Most of these buildings are found in the center of the commune.

== Demographics ==
The commune has a population of 2073 inhabitants.

According to the 2002 Census the population structure is:

- Romanians 96.39%
- Roma 3.31%
- Hungarians 0.14%
- Others 0.16%

== Economy ==
The main economic sector is agriculture.
