= List of Belgrade neighbourhoods and suburbs =

The coat of arms of Belgrade

Belgrade, the capital city of Serbia, is divided into seventeen municipalities, of which ten are urban and seven suburban. In this list, each neighbourhood or suburb is categorised by the municipality in which it is situated. Six of these ten urban municipalities are completely within the bounds of Belgrade City Proper, while the remaining four have both urban and suburban parts. The seven suburban municipalities, on the other hand, are completely located within suburban bounds.

Municipalities of the City of Belgrade are officially divided into local communities (Serbian: месна заједница, romanized: mesna zajednica). These are arbitrary administrative units which on occasion correspond to the neighbourhoods and suburbs located in a municipality, though usually they do not. Their boundaries often change as the communities merge with each other, split from one another, or change names, so the historical and traditional names of the neighbourhoods survive.

In the majority of cases, especially in the old urban areas of Belgrade, the neighbourhoods and suburbs don't have firm geographical or administrative boundaries. This sometimes causes confusion even among Belgraders, as many have different views on where one neighbourhood or suburb ends and another begins. Cases of this kind of contention include:

- Boundaries shaped through history, in many cases overlapping (Palilula–Hadžipopovac–Profesorska Kolonija).
- Sub-neighbourhoods or parts of a larger neighbourhood (Čukarica–Banovo Brdo–Čukarička Padina).
- Different names for the same areas (Englezovac–Savinac–Vračar).
- Neighbourhoods of the same name stretching outside their own municipalities (sometimes even with the same name: extreme west of the neighbourhood of Palilula (Jevremovac) belongs to the municipality of Stari Grad, not the municipality of Palilula).
- Some are completely located in another municipality (Selo Rakovica is located in the municipality of Voždovac, not in the municipality of Rakovica).
- Inhabitants of one neighbourhood, even though geographically belonging to one area, consider themselves inhabitants of another (Bežanija–Bežanijski Blokovi).

== Barajevo ==
Suburban:

- Arnajevo
- Baćevac
- Barajevo
- Beljina
- Boždarevac
- Dražanovac
- Dubrave
- Gaj
- Glumčevo Brdo
- Guncati
- Karaula
- Lisović
- Manić
- Meljak
- Nenadovac
- Pajšuma
- Rašića Kraj
- Ravni Gaj
- Rožanci
- Srednji Kraj
- Stara Lipovica
- Suva Šuma
- Šiljakovac
- Taraiš
- Trebež
- Veliki Borak
- Vitkovica
- Vranić

== Čukarica ==
Urban:

- Ada Ciganlija
- Azbestno Naselje
- Banovo Brdo
- Bele Vode
- Careva Ćuprija
- Cerak
- Cerak II
- Cerak Vinogradi
- Čukarica
- Čukarička Padina
- Filmski Grad
- Golf Naselje
- Julino Brdo
- Košutnjak
- Makiš
- Novi Železnik
- Orlovača
- Repište
- Rupčine
- Stari Cerak
- Sunčana Padina
- Žarkovo
- Žarkovo Selo
- Železnik
- Železnik Selo

Suburban:

- Gorica
- Ostružnica
- Pećani
- Rucka
- Rušanj
- Sremčica
- Umka
- Velika Moštanica

== Grocka ==
Suburban:

- Begaljica
- Belo Brdo
- Boleč
- Brestovik
- Dražanj
- Grocka
- Kaluđerica
- Kamendol
- Leštane
- Leštane Novo Naselje
- Pudarci
- Radmilovac
- Ritopek
- Strnjike
- Umčari
- Vinča
- Vrčin
- Zaklopača
- Živkovac

Neighbourhoods of Kaluđerica:

- Čardak
- Klenak
- Moravac
- Novo Naselje
- Stara Kaluđerica
- Tri Tiganja

Neighbourhoods of Vrčin:

- Avramovići
- Bajića Kraj
- Carino Naselje
- Cerje
- Donja Mala
- Feroplast
- Gornja Mala
- Jankovići
- Malo Polje
- Orlovica
- Pobrđani
- Ravnine
- Tranšped

== Lazarevac ==
Suburban:

- Arapovac
- Barzilovica
- Baroševac
- Bistrica
- Brajkovac
- Burovo
- Čibutkovica
- Cvetovac
- Dren
- Dudovica
- Junkovac
- Kruševica
- Lazarevac
- Leskovac
- Lukavica
- Mali Crljeni
- Medoševac
- Mirosaljci
- Petka
- Prkosava
- Rudovci
- Sokolovo
- Šopić
- Stepojevac
- Strmovo
- Stubica
- Šušnjar
- Trbušnica
- Veliki Crljeni
- Vrbovno
- Vreoci
- Zeoke
- Županjac

== Mladenovac ==
Suburban:

- Amerić
- Baljevac
- Beluće
- Crkvine
- Dubona
- Granice
- Jagnjilo
- Koraćica
- Kovačevac
- Mala Vrbica
- Markovac
- Međulužje
- Mladenovac
- Mladenovac Selo
- Pružatovac
- Rabrovac
- Rajkovac
- Senaja
- Šepšin
- Velika Ivanča
- Velika Krsna
- Vlaška
- Vrbovno

== Novi Beograd ==
Urban:

- Ada Međica
- Airport City Belgrade
- Bežanija
- Bežanijska Kosa
- Blokovi
- Delta City
- Dr Ivan Ribar
- Fontana
- Ledine
- Mala Ciganlija
- Novi Beograd
- Paviljoni
- Savograd
- Savski Nasip
- Staro Sajmište
- Studentski Grad
- Tošin Bunar
- Univerzitetsko Selo
- Ušće

== Obrenovac ==
Suburban:

- Baljevac
- Barič
- Belo Polje
- Brgulice
- Brović
- Draževac
- Dren
- Grabovac
- Jasenak
- Konatice
- Krtinska
- Ljubinić
- Mala Moštanica
- Mislođin
- Obrenovac
- Orašac
- Piroman
- Poljane
- Ratari
- Rvati
- Skela
- Stubline
- Trstenica
- Urovci
- Ušće
- Veliko Polje
- Vukićevica
- Zabrežje
- Zvečka

== Palilula ==
Urban:

- Ada Huja
- Blok Braća Marić
- Blok Branko Momirov
- Blok Grga Andrijanović
- Blok Sava Kovačević
- Blok Sutjeska
- Blok Zaga Malivuk
- Bogoslovija
- Ćalije
- Čaplja
- Deponija
- Dunav City
- Dunavski Venac
- Hadžipopovac
- Karaburma
- Karaburma II
- Karaburma-Dunav
- Kotež
- Kožara
- Krnjača
- Lešće
- Mika Alas
- Nova Karaburma
- Paliula
- Partizanski Blok
- Profesorska Kolonija
- Reva
- Rospi Ćuprija
- Stara Karaburma
- Tašmajdan
- Viline Vode
- Vilingrad
- Višnjica
- Višnjička Banja
- Višnjičko Polje

Suburban:

- Besni Fok
- Borča
- Dunavac
- Glogonjski Rit
- Jabučki Rit
- Kovilovo
- Ovča
- Padinska Skela
- Preliv
- Sebeš (Ovčanski)
- Slanci
- Široka Bara
- Široka Greda
- Veliko Selo
- Vrbovski

Neighbourhoods of Borča:

- Atovi
- Borča Greda
- Borča I or Centar I
- Borča II or Centar II
- Borča III or Centar III
- Borča IV or Centar IV
- Borča V or Centar V
- Borčanski Sebeš
- Crvenka
- Guvno
- Irgot
- Mali Zbeg
- Mokri Sebeš
- Nova Borča
- Popova Bara
- Pretok
- Sebeš
- Sivi Dom
- Slatina
- Stara Borča
- Vihor
- Zrenjaninski Put

Neighbourhoods of Padinska Skela:

- Industrijsko Naselje
- Novo Naselje
- Srednje Naselje
- Staro Naselje
- Tovilište

== Rakovica ==
Urban:

- Jelezovac
- Kanarevo Brdo
- Kijevo
- Kneževac
- Labudovo Brdo
- Miljakovac
- Miljakovac I
- Miljakovac II
- Miljakovac III
- Petlovo Brdo
- Pionirski Grad
- Rakovica
- Resnik
- Skojevsko Naselje
- Straževica
- Sunčani Breg
- Vidikovac
- Vidikovačka Padina

== Savski Venac ==
Urban:

- Bara Venecija
- Dedinje
- Diplomatska Kolonija
- Gospodarska Mehana
- Jatagan Mala
- Karađorđev park
- Lisičji Potok
- Mostarska Petlja
- Prokop
- Savamala
- Senjak
- Stadion
- Topčider
- Topčidersko Brdo
- Zapadni Vračar
- Zeleni Venac

== Sopot ==
Suburban:

- Babe
- Drlupa
- Dučina
- Đurinci
- Guberevac
- Mala Ivanča
- Mali Požarevac
- Nemenikuće
- Parcani, Sopot
- Popović
- Ralja
- Rogača
- Ropočevo
- Sibnica
- Slatina
- Sopot
- Stojnik

== Stari Grad ==
Urban:

- Andrićev Venac
- Dorćol
- Jalija
- Jevremovac
- Kalemegdan
- Kopitareva Gradina
- Kosančićev Venac
- London
- Skadarlija
- Stari Grad
- Studentski Trg
- Terazije
- Terazijska Terasa
- Trg Nikole Pašića
- Trg Republike
- Varoš Kapija

== Surčin ==
Suburban:

- Bečmen
- Boljevci
- Dobanovci
- Jakovo
- Ključ
- Progar
- Petrovčić
- Radio Far
- Stremen
- Surčin

== Voždovac ==
Urban:

- Autokomanda
- Banjica
- Banjica II
- Braće Jerković (II and III)
- Dušanovac
- Jajinci
- Kumodraž
- Kumodraž I
- Kumodraž II
- Lekino Brdo
- Mala Utrina
- Marinkova Bara
- Medaković (I, II and III)
- Pašino Brdo
- Selo Rakovica
- Siva Stena
- Šumice
- Torlak
- Trošarina
- Voždovac

Suburban:

- Beli Potok
- Bubanj Potok
- Gaj
- Pinosava
- Ripanj
- Stepin Lug
- Šuplja Stena
- Zuce

Neighbourhoods of Ripanj:

- Bela Reka
- Bela Zemlja
- Brđani
- Čaršija
- Kablar
- Kolonija
- Prnjavor
- Stepašinovac
- Stražarija
- Trešnja

== Vračar ==
Urban:

- Crveni Krst
- Cvetni Trg
- Čubura
- Englezovac
- Istočni Vračar
- Gradić Pejton
- Grantovac
- Kalenić
- Krunski Venac
- Neimar
- Savinac
- Slavija
- Vračar

== Zemun ==
Urban:

- Altina
- Bački Ilovik
- Batajnica
- Crveni Barjak
- Ćukovac
- Donji Grad
- Franjine Rudine
- Galenika
- Gardoš
- Gornji Grad
- Goveđi Brod
- Jelovac
- Kalvarija
- Kamendin
- Kolonija Zmaj
- Lido
- Mala Pruga
- Malo Ratno Ostrvo
- Marija Bursać
- Meandri
- Muhar
- Nova Galenika
- Novi Grad
- Plavi Horizonti
- Retenzija
- Sava Kovačević
- Sutjeska
- Šangaj
- 13. Maj
- Veliko Ratno Ostrvo
- Vojni Put
- Vojni Put I
- Vojni Put II
- Zemun
- Zemun Bačka
- Zemun Polje
- Zemunski Kej
- Železnička Kolonija

Suburban:

- Busije
- Grmovac
- Ugrinovci

== Zvezdara ==
Urban:

- Bulbuder
- Crveni Krst
- Cvetanova Ćuprija
- Cvetkova Pijaca
- Denkova Bašta
- Đeram
- Konjarnik
- Konjarnik I
- Konjarnik II
- Konjarnik III
- Lion
- Lipov Lad
- Mali Mokri Lug
- Mirijevo
- Mirijevo II
- Mirijevo III
- Mirijevo IV
- Novo Mirijevo
- Orlovsko Naselje
- Padina
- Rudo
- Slavujev Venac
- Staro Mirijevo
- Učiteljsko Naselje
- Veliki Mokri Lug
- Vukov Spomenik
- Zeleno Brdo
- Zvezdara
- Zvezdara II

== See also ==
- Subdivisions of Belgrade
- Populated places of Serbia
