= Peštan =

Peštan (Пештан)
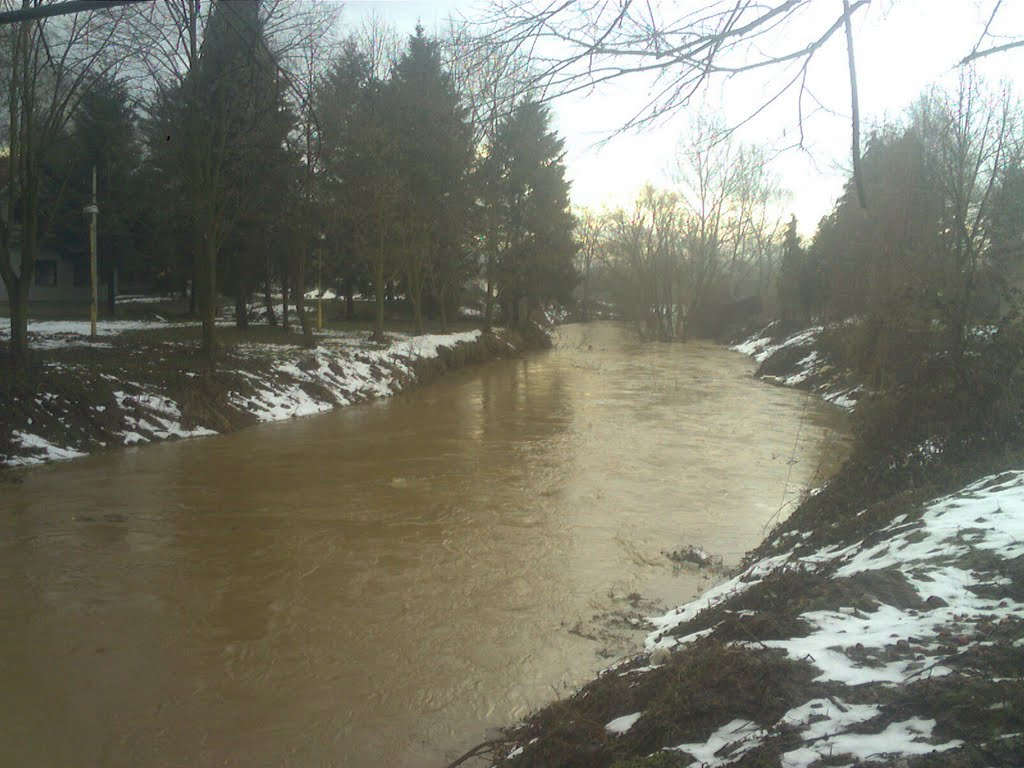
- Peštan at Baroševac

Location
- Country: Serbia

Physical characteristics
- Mouth: Kolubara
  - location: near Vreoci
  - coordinates: 44°26′09″N 20°15′24″E
- Length: 33 km (21 mi)

Basin features
- Progression: Kolubara→ Sava→ Danube→ Black Sea

Peštan (Serbian: Пештан) is a river of Serbia and right tributary of the Kolubara river near Vreoci. Its length is 33 kilometres (21 mi). It belongs to the Black Sea basin.

== Geography ==
The river originates on the northern slopes of the Bukulja mountain. It was named after its very sandy riverbed (Serbian pesak, "sand"). Peštan used to be 45 kilometres (28 mi) long, and originally flew into the Kolubara at the village of Draževac in the municipality of Obrenovac. Due to the vast works on the lignite surface mining in the Kolubara basin, the river was shortened to 33 kilometres (21 mi), partially channeled and rerouted.

The villages located on the river include Rudovci, Mali Crljeni, Burovo, Zeoke and Baroševac. Despite not being a major river, and with all the amelioration works in its basin, Peštan remained a seasonally flooding river, especially in spring, damaging agricultural fields and settlements in its watershed.

== Mining ==
The flooding river also poses constant threat to the Kolubara's surface mines. In 2021, construction of five damn began, with adjoining retention basins. An additional drainage canal, on the southern border of the watershed, will also be built. The planned dams and reservoirs are Bistrica (began in August 2021), Trbušnica (both should be finished by April 2023), Kruševica (starting at early 2022). Rudovci (late 2022) and Darosavica with the drainage canal (2023-2014).

Apart from preventing floods, this will allow the expansion of the mining "Field E", which is estimated to hold 350 million tons of coal. At full capacity it will spread over 10 square kilometres (3.9 sq mi), with the planned production of 12 million tons per year.

== See also ==
- List of rivers in Serbia
