= Kolubara =

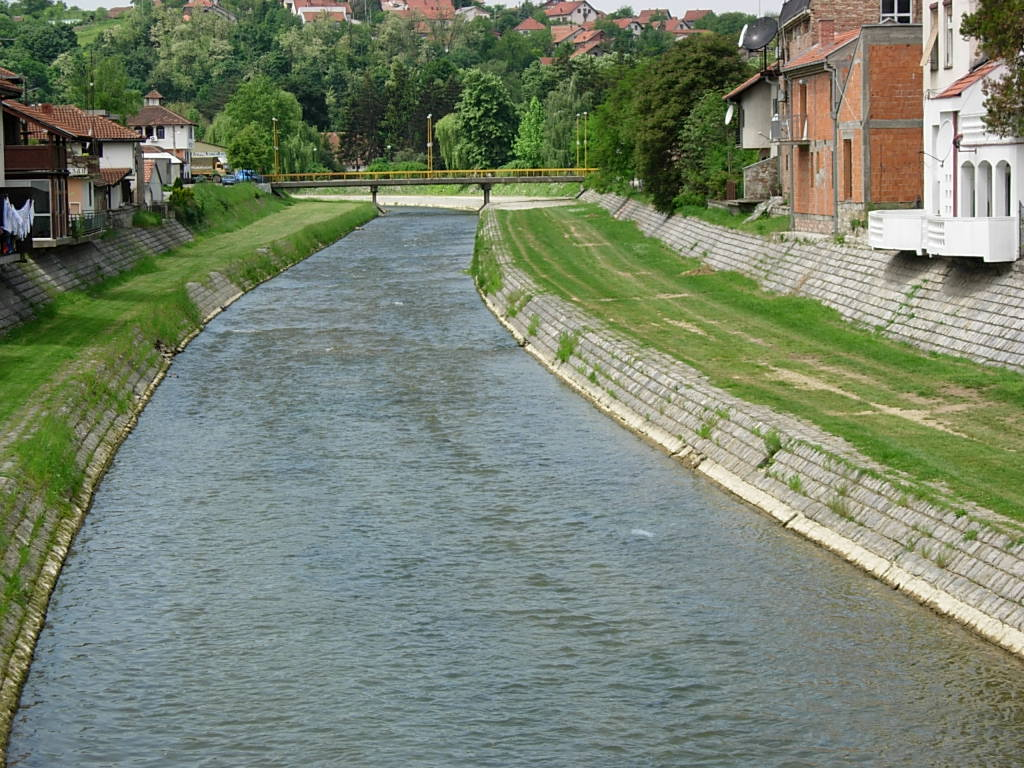
- Kolubara River in Valjevo

Location
- Country: Serbia

Physical characteristics
- Source
  - location: Confluence of Obnica and Jablanica in Valjevo
  - coordinates: 44°15′41″N 19°52′15″E
- Mouth
  - location: into Sava River near Obrenovac
  - coordinates: 44°39′43″N 20°14′55″E
- Length: 86.6 km (53.8 mi)
- Basin size: 3,638 km^{2} (1,405 sq mi)

Basin features
- Progression: Sava→ Danube→ Black Sea

The Kolubara (Serbian Cyrillic: Колубара, pronounced [kɔlǔbara]) is an 87 km (54 mi) long river in western Serbia; it is an eastern, right tributary to the Sava river.

Due to the many long tributaries creating a branchy system within the river's drainage basin, the short Kolubara drains relatively large area of 3,639 km^{2} (1,405 sq mi). It is part of the larger Black Sea drainage.

The river is not navigable, but its valley is very important for transportation. Here are located Belgrade-Valjevo road, parts of Belgrade-Šabac road, Ibarska magistrala (Highway of Ibar) and the Belgrade-Bar railway.

The Kolubara was the site of one of the major battles on the Balkans in the World War I, the Battle of Kolubara in 1914.

There is a game hunting ground "Kolubara" in the valley of the river, on the territory of the Lazarevac municipality.

== Watershed ==
The Kolubara is formed by two small rivers, the Obnica and Jablanica.

Obnica is the river in Western Serbia that springs at the foot of the mountain Medvednik. It flows eastward, through the villages of Suvodanje, Bobova, Majinović, Pričević and Zlatarić, and at the city of Valjevo meets the river Jablanica and forms Kolubara. The Obnica is 25 km long.

Jablanica originates on the eastern slopes of the Jablanik mountain, just few kilometers away from Obnica. It curves around Parač mountain and next to the village of Balinović, before it meets Obnica in Valjevo. The Jablanica is 21.5 km long.

This is also the beginning of the 90 km (56 mi) long region of the Kolubara valley, divided in two large parts, referred to as Upper (gornja) Kolubara and Lower (donja) Kolubara (around the Belgrade's suburb of Obrenovac).

=== Tributaries ===
==== Upper Kolubara ====
At Valjevo, the Kolubara receives the river Gradac from the right and forms the Valjevo valley between the surrounding mountains, in which it spills in several parallel flows. After Valjevo, the most populous city in western Serbia, there are no major settlements on the river, except for the villages of Mlađevo and Slovac and the river receives the right tributaries of Ribnica and Lepenica and the left tributary of Rabas. At Slovac, near the confluence of the right tributary of the Toplica, the Kolubara carved the epigenetic Slovačka sutjeska, which separates Upper and Lower Kolubara. Upper Kolubara constitutes most of the modern Kolubara District of Serbia.

==== Lower Kolubara ====
The Kolubara turns north and continues to flow in several parallel flows, receiving in this section its major tributaries: Ljig River, Turija, Lukavica and Peštan, from the right; Kladnica and Tamnava, from the left. Due to the floods, even though its valley is densely populated, there are no settlements on the river itself, until it reaches Obrenovac, few kilometers before it empties into the Sava (only navigable near its mouth in Sava). However, many large villages and towns are located in the vicinity of the Kolubara: Lajkovac, Jabučje, Lazarevac, Šopić, Skobalj, Vreoci, Mali Borak, Veliki Crljeni, Draževac, Mislođin and Barič, where it flows into the Sava.

Lower Kolubara itself is divided in two sub-regions, the (upper) Kolubara coal basin and the (lower) Obrenovac micro-region.

== Kolubara coal basin ==
In Neogene, the region of Kolubara was a huge bay of the Pannonian Sea (Kolubarski zaliv). As a result of abundant vegetation in the ancient sea, region of Kolubara and neighboring Tamnava (around Kolubara's longest tributary) today are immense lignite field which covers over 1,200 km^{2} (460 sq mi). It is estimated that coal deposits are as much as 22 billion tons, with coal layers being to 50 m (160 ft) deep, and over 20 million tons of coal are being extracted each year. Major mines are Rudovci, Kolubara (at Veliki Crljeni) and Kosmaj, with many surface digs being developed lately. With the mines actively covering 600 km^{2} (230 sq mi), Kolubara mine is the largest one in the Balkans.

A series of coal based power stations are built in the basin, including Kolubara (130 MW, at Veliki Crljeni), Nikola Tesla B-1 (in 1983) and Nikola Tesla B-2 (both 615 MW, in Obrenovac).

Because of its importance for industry and economy in general, the municipality of Lazarevac, to which the coal basin mainly belongs, was attached administratively to the City of Belgrade in 1971.

After three years, on 19 September 2007 the river course between Vreoci and Veliki Crljeni was transferred to the new artificial river bed. This will allow the opening of a new surface coal field Veliki Crljeni in September 2008 with an estimated coal reserves of over 30 million tons.

The mining projects at Kolubara have been plagued with corruption: in 2011, 16 current and former members of Elektroprivreda Srbije, the operator, were arrested on suspicion of embezzlement. In addition to this, resettlement procedures for affected local communities were, according to civil society organizations, not executed in accordance with Serbian law.

There are possibilities for the development of the tourism, given the vicinity of Belgrade. There are two natural scenic overlooks above the mines. One is "Tamnava", from which the archeological sites within the mines can be observed, and the other is Medoševac, which is considered as the largest scenic overlook in the Balkans, with the view over the entire mines, which look like "the surface of the Moon". The Processing section has an exhibition of the old steam locomotives which were used in the mines. There are also several lakes formed in the former mine shafts.

The process of displacement of the Kolubara river bed in an effort to make possible exploitation of the "Veliko polje G" coal seam began in 2007. Phase 2 of the project was finished in July 2017 when another 2.6 km (1.6 mi) of the river was conducted into the new, displaced bed. "Veliko polje G" has an estimated coal reserves of 36,4 million tons.

== See also ==
- Battle of Kolubara

== Sources ==
- Serbia Energy - Internet Resource on Energy and Mining in Serbia www.serbia-energy.eu
- Mala Prosvetina Enciklopedija, Third edition (1985); Prosveta; ISBN 86-07-00001-2
- Jovan Đ. Marković (1990): Enciklopedijski geografski leksikon Jugoslavije; Svjetlost-Sarajevo; ISBN 86-01-02651-6

== See also ==
- List of rivers in Serbia
