= Strmovo =

Strmovo may refer to:

- Strmovo (Bajina Bašta), a village in Serbia
- Strmovo (Lajkovac), a village in Serbia
- Strmovo (Lazarevac), a village in Serbia
