= Radomir Belaćević =

Serbian actor and film director (1929–2005)

Radomir Belaćević (31 December 1929 – 3 June 2005) was a Serbian film director, actor, producer and writer.

== Biography ==
Belaćević was born on 31 December 1929 in the village of Junkovac, near the town of Lazarevac, Serbia. He owned a private film corporation called "Studio Film" and wrote several books. Belaćević directed television dramas such as Tatin sin, Sudija i advokat, Žandarm, Carina, Ženidba na švedski način and Majka šalje sina u armiju, and has also written some movie scripts based on his books.

He died on 3 June 2005.

== Filmography ==
As producer:

- Konobarica ("The Waitress") (1995)
- Dečak iz Junkovca (A boy from Junkovac) (1995)
- Tatin sin (Daddy's son) (1999)

As director:

- Tatin sin (Daddy's son)
- Sudija i advokat (Judge and a lawyer)
- Žandarm (A cop)
- Carina (Custom)
- Ženidba na Švedski način (Wedding in a Swedish way)
- Маjka šalje sina u armiju (Mother sends her son to the army)

=== Film scripts ===
Belaćević wrote these film scripts, which are based on his novels:

- Ne pušim više (I quit smoking)
- Seks i droga (Sex and drugs)
- Таjni klub (The secret club)
- Hitler zamislio pobedu (Hitler imagined the victory)
- Stranac u Parizu (A foreigner in Paris)
- Kоnobarica (The waitress)
- Dečak iz Junkovca (A boy from Junkovac)
- Tatin sin (Daddy's son)

== Bibliography ==
He has written many books, including:

- Mnogi kradu (Many steal)
- Socijalizam i promašaji (Socialism and mistakes)
- Stranac u Parizu (A foreigner in Paris)
- Ukleto porodilište (Cursed maternity ward)
- Konobarica ("The Waitress")
- Privatni detektiv (Private detective)
- Božija pravda (God's justice)
