= Županjac (disambiguation) =

Županjac may refer to:

- Tomislavgrad, a town in Bosnia and Herzegovina
- Županjac, a village in Serbia
