= Trbušnica =

Trbušnica may refer to:

- Trbušnica (Lazarevac), a village in Serbia
- Trbušnica (Loznica), a village in Serbia
