= Medoševac =

Medoševac may refer to:

- Medoševac (Lazarevac)
- Medoševac (Niš)
