= Kolubara coal basin =

Open-pit coal basin in Serbia

- Рударски басен Колубара
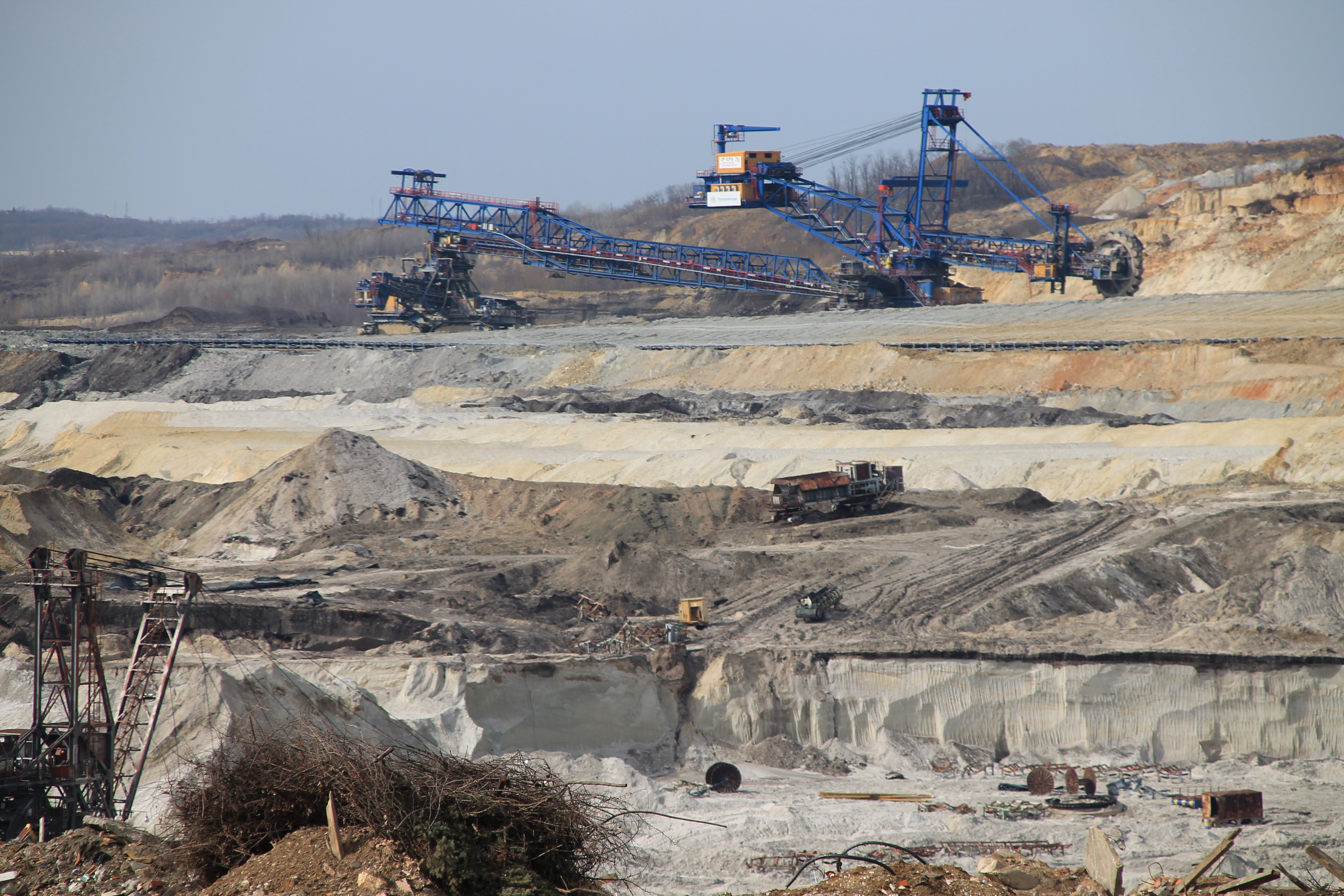
- View on Kolubara mining complex

- Location within Serbia
- Location: Lazarevac, Serbia; 44°25′44″N 20°17′11″E
- Products: Coal and lignite mining, smelting
- Production: 22.6 million tonnes of coal (2025)
- Opened: 1896; 130 years ago (Origins)
- Company: Elektroprivreda Srbije (EPS)
- Website: www.eps.rs/eng/poslovanje-ugalj/Pages/Kopovi.aspx

Kolubara coal basin (or shortly RB Kolubara) is a Serbian coal mining basin and smelting complex owned and operated by Elektroprivreda Srbije (EPS). It is located near the town of Lazarevac, Serbia. The mine has coal reserves amounting to 2.2 billion tonnes of lignite, making it one of the largest lignite reserves in Europe, and it produces 22.6 million tonnes of coal per year (as of 2025).

Since the Kolubara coal mining basin is the largest coal supplier for Elektroprivreda Srbije, it plays a vital role in the country's energy independence. As of 2025, about 47.88% of Serbia's total annual electricity generation comes from the thermal power plant complex TPP Nikola Tesla, which uses lignite mined at Kolubara as its fuel, amounting to about 14.6 billion kW hours of electricity per year.

== History ==
The beginnings of mining in the region of Kolubara coal basin are associated with the year 1896 when the first pit Zvizdar was opened. In the eastern and western part of the basin coal has been successively extracted from the 14 pits Zvizdar, Sokolovac, Skobalj, Radljevo, Prkosava, Veliki Crljeni, Kolubara 1, Veliki Crljeni - Kolubara 2, Kosmaj - Kolubara 3, Baroševac, Šopić, Junkovac and others. A turning point in coal production came in 1952 with the opening of the first open pit (Fields A) which started mass surface mining of lignite. Opening of new mines and processing facilities fallowed. The mining projects' original intention was to secure a stable, constant supply of energy and electricity for the country, which is why the Serbian federal government considers these projects of national interest.

As of 2025, the Kolubara coal basin has a total of 9,884 employees, making it the largest entity of Elektroprivreda Srbije by number of employees.

== Environmental Improvement project ==
In 2011 Kolubara started the Environmental Improvement project in order to improve the mining conditions and effects on the environment as well as the local communities involved. The estimated cost of this project is approximately EUR 165.2; the initiative is financed by the European Bank of Reconstruction and Development EBRD (EUR 80 million ), the German state development bank KfW (EUR 75 million) and state electricity company Elektroprivreda Srbije (EUR 80 million). According to information provided by EBRD, the investment will generate benefits resulting in an environmental improvement of the Kolubara complex. The main benefits being more efficient and cleaner extraction of natural resources, supplying the existing power plants with lignite of a uniform quality (that will lead to more stable and efficient operations and controlled uniform emissions which will result in lower levels of CO_{2} and other pollutants as well as reduced wear and tear and maintenance costs) and helping Serbia to achieve emission limits set by the recently introduced EU Directive 2010/75 on Industrial Emissions.

The Environmental Improvement project's goal is to also introduce new equipment, strategies and techniques to the workers and planners of Elektroprivreda Srbije (EPS). The purpose of introducing the new technologies and methods is to increase efficiency both economically speaking and environmentally speaking.

== Controversial issues ==
=== Social impact ===
For the last 10 years the Kolubara mine basin has been expanding towards the settlements causing conflicts between inhabitants and mines. This problem affects around 6000 families. During the last decade, Elektroprivreda Srbije has moved hundreds of households, two complete villages and partially 10 villages. One of the main villages impacted was Vreoci, which resides in central Serbia. The project required a new mine pit on the location of the Vreoci graveyard as well as the relocation of more than 1,000 households. Underneath the graveyard lies approximately 50 million tons of coal, a requirement to get to the 600 million tons of lignite which would help the project but damage the local community's burial grounds and cultural landmark. Despite the heavy protests from the villagers, the EBRD loan was approved and the excavation of the graves continued. These protests have been met with police intervention and a series of blockades preventing the villages into the graveyard. The villagers asked for their houses to be relocated first so that shelter was secured, yet that process has not been as successful as promised. The lack of progress in the resettlement phase of the project has caused villagers to live in sub-par conditions and in locations with high air and ground pollution. Further protests ensued, such as street protests and hunger strikes.

Resettlement caused by the Tamnava West expansion in 2003 was not done according to good standards either, the main reason being shortage of funds which led to slowing down of the land acquisition and development of the proposed infrastructure. In the end, they were never conducted, which diminished credibility of Elektroprivreda Srbije in the eyes of inhabitants. With continued expansion of the mine, the relocation of households became urgent and residents were under enormous pressure to accept financial compensation and leave the territory designated for coal excavation. The value of their property was often underestimated.

=== Environmental Impact ===
In spite of the Environmental improvement project carried out in 2011, there are still various environmental consequences of the mining work in Kolubara complex such as gas releases (carbon monoxide, sulfur dioxide, ozone etc.), pollution of water supply and deterioration of the ground.

==== 2013 Landslide ====
In May 2013 the overburden of field B of the Kolubara lignite mine collapsed and caused a landslide that destroyed seven houses and one road in the town of Junkovac. On 28 March 2014 Serbian nongovernmental organization CEKOR (Centre for Ecology and Sustainable Development) pressed charges against Kolubara company for endangering public safety in Junkovac. The case was made after the statement by the Department for Mining Inspection in the Ministry of Natural Resources, Mining and Spatial planning that confirmed the Kolubara company has overloaded the dump field that caused the landslide.

=== Corruption ===
In October 2011 authorities arrested 17 people, including two former directors of the Kolubara mine Dragan Tomić and Vladan Jovičić, eight executive managers and seven owners of private firms with which Kolubara conducted business. The executive managers are suspected of abusing their positions to illegally appropriate up to 2.9 million Euros, while enabling private companies to illegally profit 9.2 million Euros. Pre-trial proceedings were initiated because of suspicion that Kolubara's assets were used illegally through the leasing of construction machinery from privately owned companies, and by enabling other corporations and persons material gain. The first of two corruption trials against Dragan Tomic started on 25 May 2012. Tomic and four others were indicted in January on charges of abuse of power and of damaging the Kolubara budget for US$650,000 between 2004 and 2008. They face up to 12 years in prison.

In January 2013 Serbia's Energy Minister Zorana Mihajlović in her address, announced that Kolubara's business dealings are now a subject of an investigation, on suspicion of financial abuses. Allegations include paying high salaries to non-existent employees, buying over-priced equipment, and using resettlement compensation to pass bloated amounts of money to people close to the management.

There have also been allegations of corruption within the EPS board members. Radoslav Savatijević, member of the Managing Board of EPS was given a huge compensation of EUR 1.2 million for his house in Vreoci; however, his house was not near the location of the mining and may not even have been eligible for expropriation compensation as the house was not registered as his residence address. Similar cases have risen throughout this project, causing anger and distrust amongst the locals of affected villages.

== Events ==
=== 2014 Floods ===
Due to heavy floods which devastated the area in May 2014, there has been a week-long interruption in coal transport from Kolubara. Water two meters high covered all the machines and the railway on which the coal is being transported. The Belgrade media have written about the damage and repayment of it since the machinery and equipment were not ensured against flooding. Damage is estimated to be at least 100 million Euros. The flood’s impacts were much worse for those living near the mine, especially where the waters and mud mixed with pollution from the mine.
