= Toplica (Kolubara) =

Coordinates: 44°20′21″N 20°05′20″E

Basin features
- Progression: Kolubara→ Sava→ Danube→ Black Sea

Toplica is a river near Valjevo, Serbia, a right tributary to Kolubara.
