= Memorial Church, Lazarevac =

Coordinates: 44°22′56″N 20°15′46″E

Memorial Church in Lazarevac
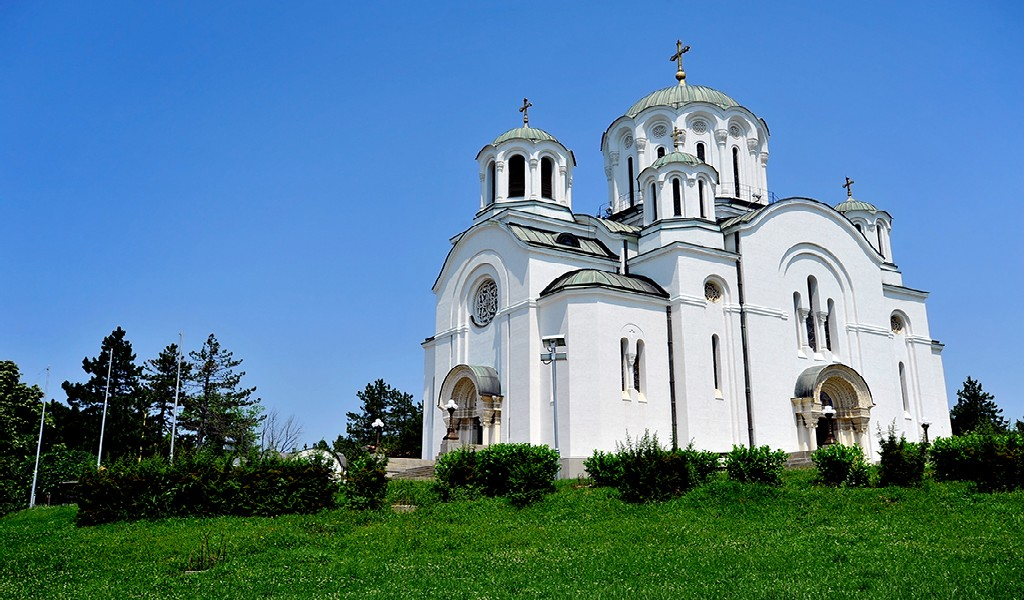
- Temple of Saint Dimitrije
- Interactive map of the Memorial Church in Lazarevac area

General information
- Type: Memorial church
- Location: Lazarevac, Belgrade, Lazarevac, Serbia

Cultural Heritage of Serbia
- Type: Cultural Monument of Exceptional Importance
- Designated: 7 November 1966
- Reference no.: SK 82

Temple of Saint Dimitrije is a church with the charnel-house in Lazarevac, built in the glory of soldiers of Serbian and Austro-Hungarian army who were killed in Battle of Kolubara. The architectural and urban ambience of Lazarevac, city with quite a short past, hosts this temple which is, besides its high silhouette values, significant for its religious and social function. It is a notable realization of the interwar Serbian church architecture, but also the Russian builders who immigrated to Serbia because of the civil war in their homeland.

== Construction and architecture ==
The idea of raising a memorial church with a charnel-house in Lazarevac stemmed from the need to store the relics of warriors killed in the Battle of Kolubara in 1914, on the battlefields around Lazarevac. In order to implement these ideas, a "Committee to raise the memorial church and charnel-house in Lazarevac" was established in 1921. It was headed by the priest Čedomir M. Popović. In 1937, the Committee ceased to exist and the "Association for raising memorial church with charnel-house in Lazarevac" was formed, led by the priest Borivoje Đorđević. In the architectural tradition of the twentieth century, which developed in the area of today's District of Lazarevac, the dominant type of building is a longitudinal building with prominent bell tower on the western front. The Memorial Church in Lazarevac represents a bold step forward which opened a new chapter in church architecture from this area. The spirit of historicism is clearly expressed in this building. Deep understanding of old and new ideological and aesthetic principles is an important segment in analyzing historical and artistic importance of the Lazarevac memorial church with the charnel-house. Lazarevac memorial church with the charnel house is inspired by the Presentation of the Virgin Monastery in Senjak in Belgrade. Lazarevac temple was built by the project of the Russian emigrant architect Ivan Afanasjevič Rik, between 1938 and 1941. It has a basis in the form of a cross of a developed type. The main dome rises at the intersection of the arms of the cross, while four smaller domes rise above the arms. One dome rises above the western facade and it houses the bell tower. Since the plan did not foresee the choir apses, the church has an emphasized longevity of volume. Enough light does not come to the interior of the narthex through two narrow single windows open on the west wall, so that the main source of light comes from the opposite side of the nave, but in spite of that, the narthex is underexposed in certain parts of the day. In contrast, the nave is well lit thanks to a series of cupola windows and window openings in the form of trefoil and two single windows on the side walls.

== Significance ==
What makes this building special, in addition to its distinctive architectural value, is its unique memorial function. The church's crypt stores about 37 m³ of remains of Serbian and enemy soldiers who died in the Battle of Kolubara in 1914. The crypt was renovated between 1961 and 1964 under the direction of architect D. St. Pavlović. The area of the crypt was then divided into three parts. The first part is located in the west, the second in the central, and the third in the eastern part of the crypt. The main entrance to the crypt was opened on the north wall of the west continent. Their surfaces are filled by special panels on which basic information about the Battle of Kolubara and significant details are carved and effective visual representations of battlefields on which the Battle of Kolubara took place, arrangement of Serbian and enemy forces at certain stages of the battle, display of breakthroughs and directions of enemy prosecution. Relief plates are also built into particular frames. They illustrate the details of the Battle of Kolubara and the work of the sculptor Мihailo Tomić in a creative way. Text is engraved in the eastern side of the wall mass. The silhouette figures of Serbian soldiers, peasant men and peasant women in folk costumes were derived in shallow relief. With regard to the grave function of this space, the wall compartments of the charnel-house above the sarcophagus are refined with a decorative cladding of red marble, and 21 gray marble plate inscribed with the army's regiments is inserted on each side; on the north wall, of the Army of the commander General Živojin Mišić, on the eastern wall, of the II Army of the commander Duke Stepan Stepanović, and on the south wall, of the III Army of the commander General Pavle Jurišić-Šturm and of the Užice military commander General Vukoman Aračić. The niche of the east continent hosts a sculpture of a soldier. This building was included into the list of cultural monuments of "exceptional importance" in 1966. The church iconostasis was painted in 1940 by a prominent Russian emigrant painter Pimen Sofronov. It had been planned that he should paint the church with icons, but this could not be achieved due to the outbreak of the Second World War. The church was painted with icons only in the last decade of the 20th and first half of the 21st century. Built at the very end of the interwar period, the memorial church with the charnel-house in Lazarevac is stylistically unique and recognizable work. It is, next to Church of Saint Đorđe in Oplenac, the most monumental memorial that was erected in the former Кingdom of Yugoslavia, which gives it a special character.

== Gallery ==
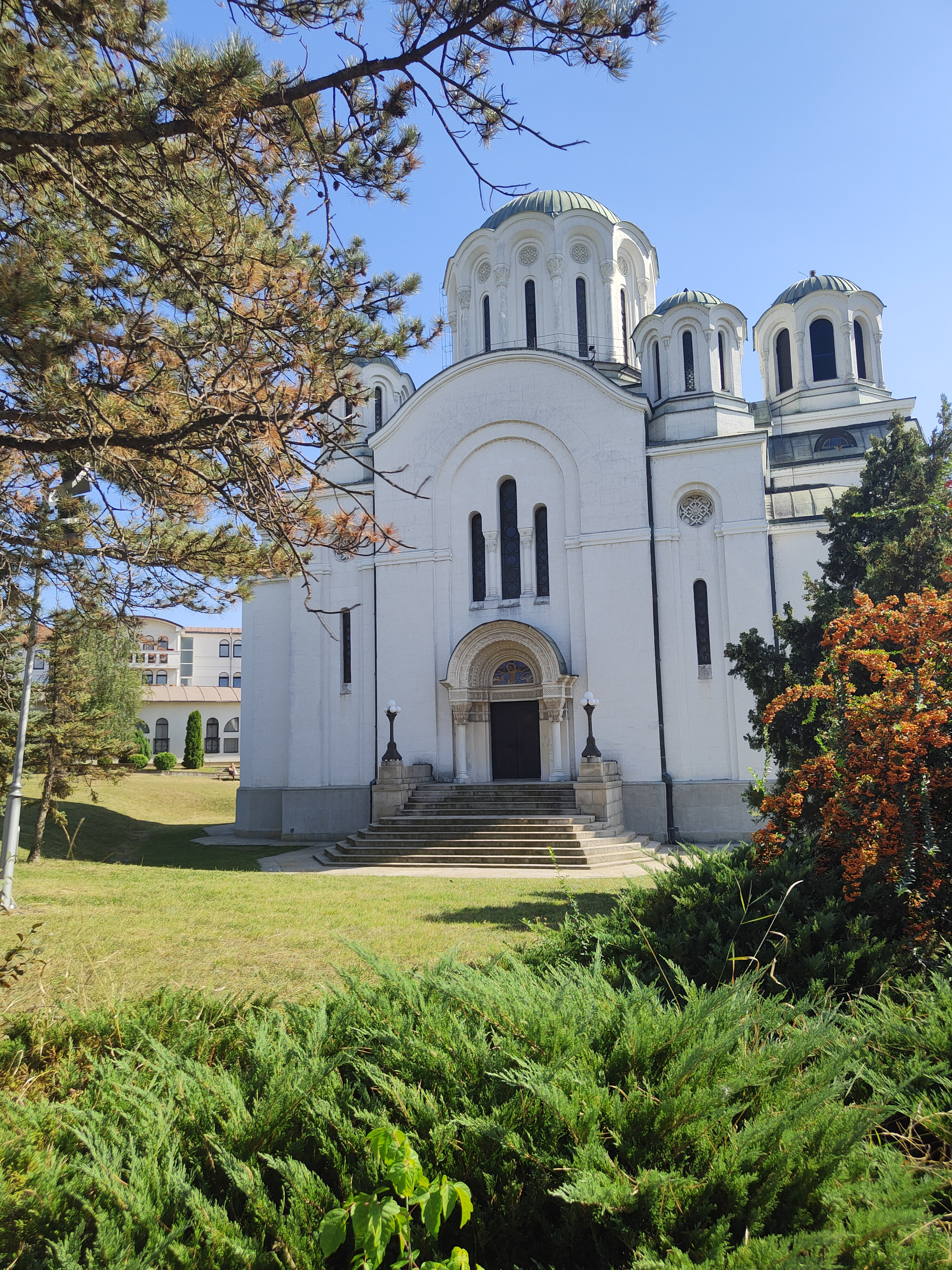

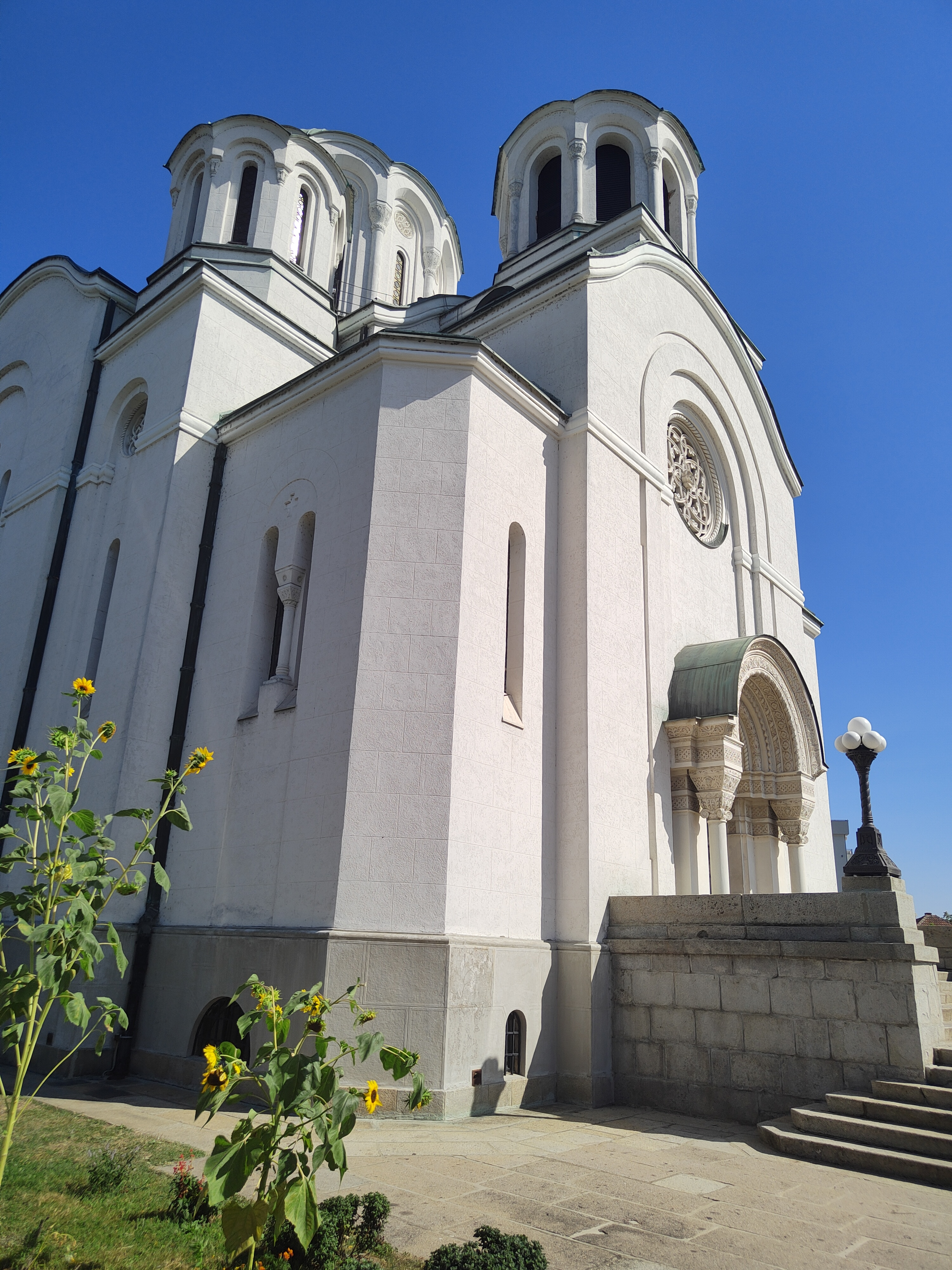

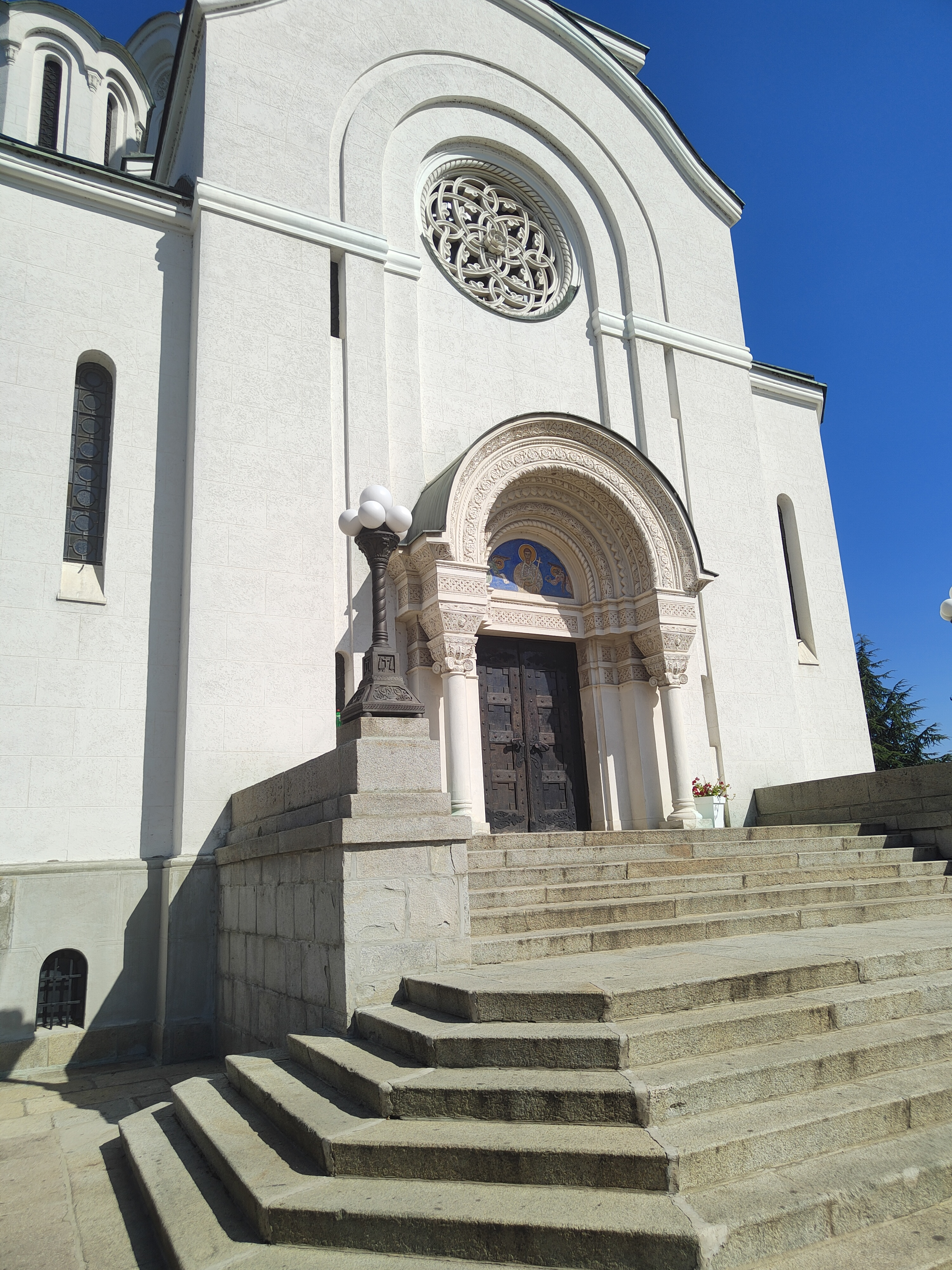

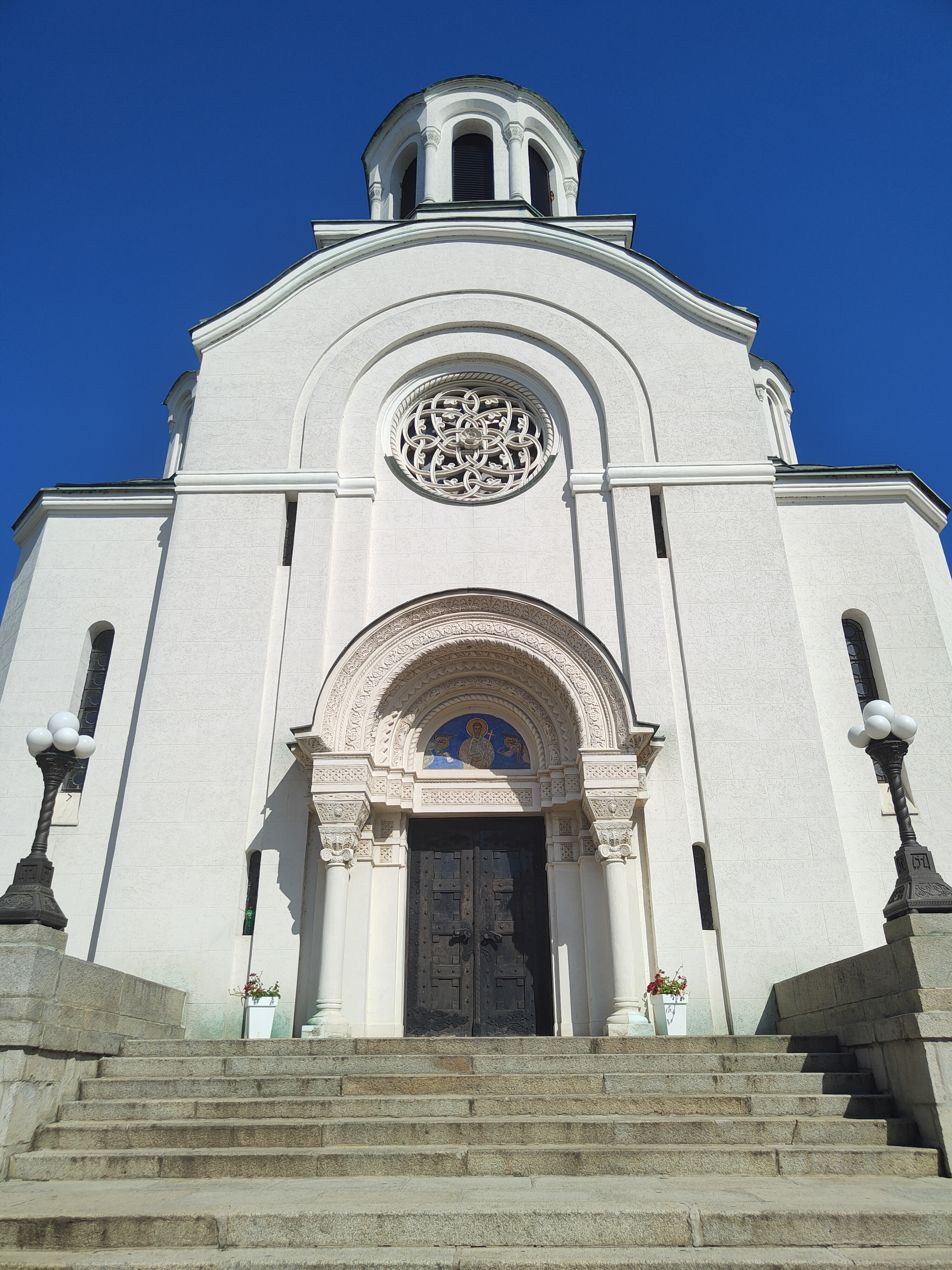

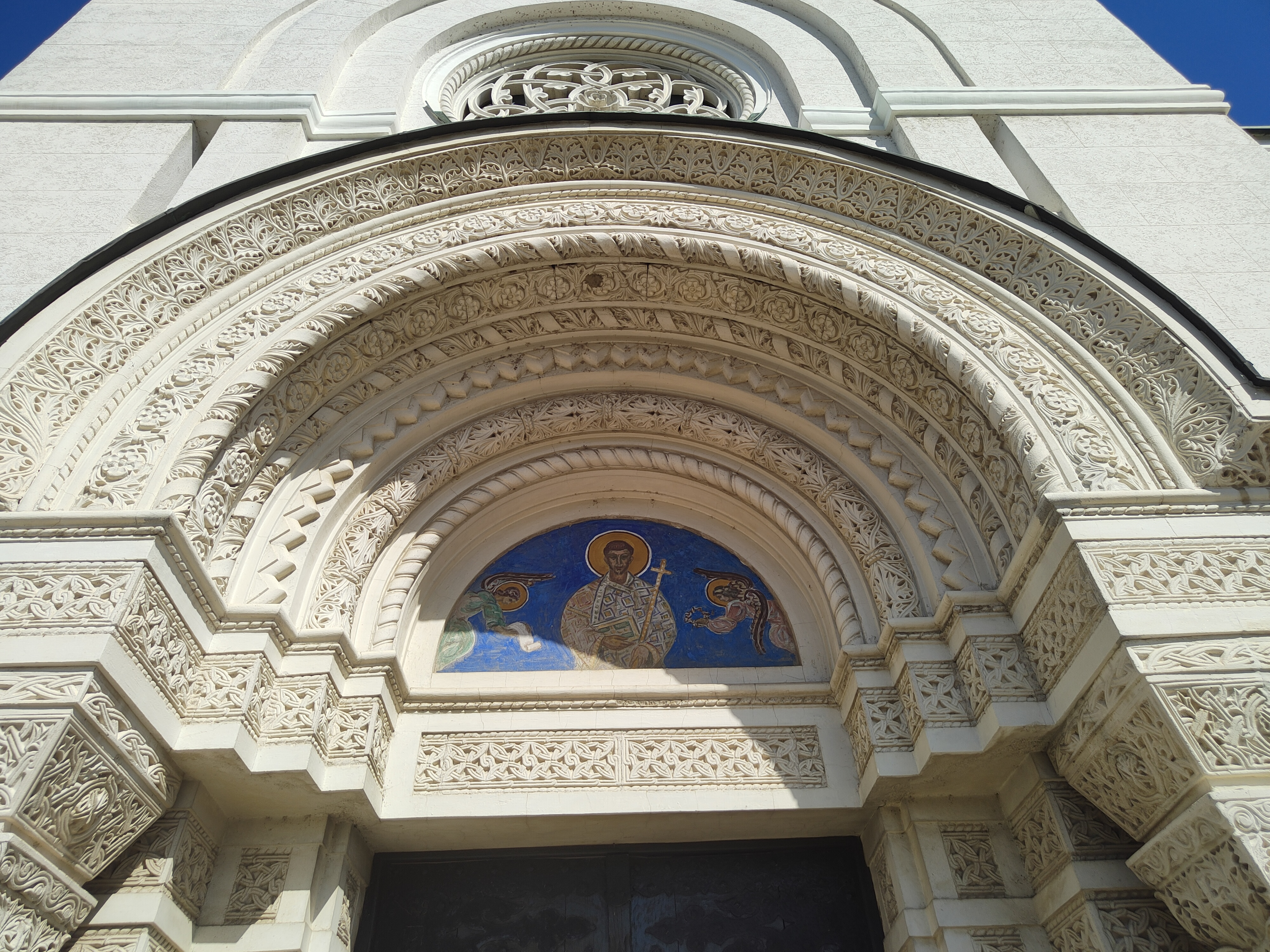

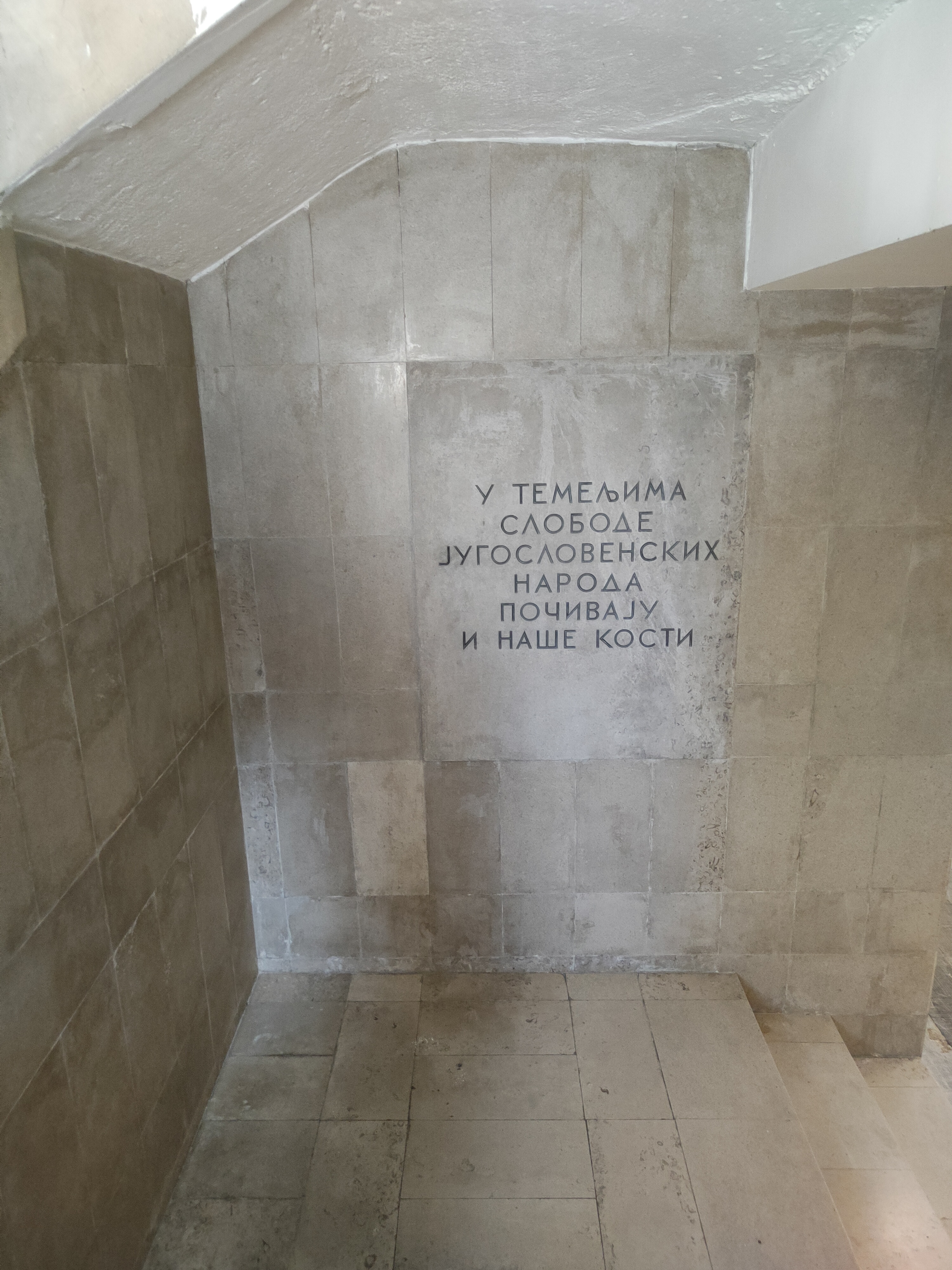

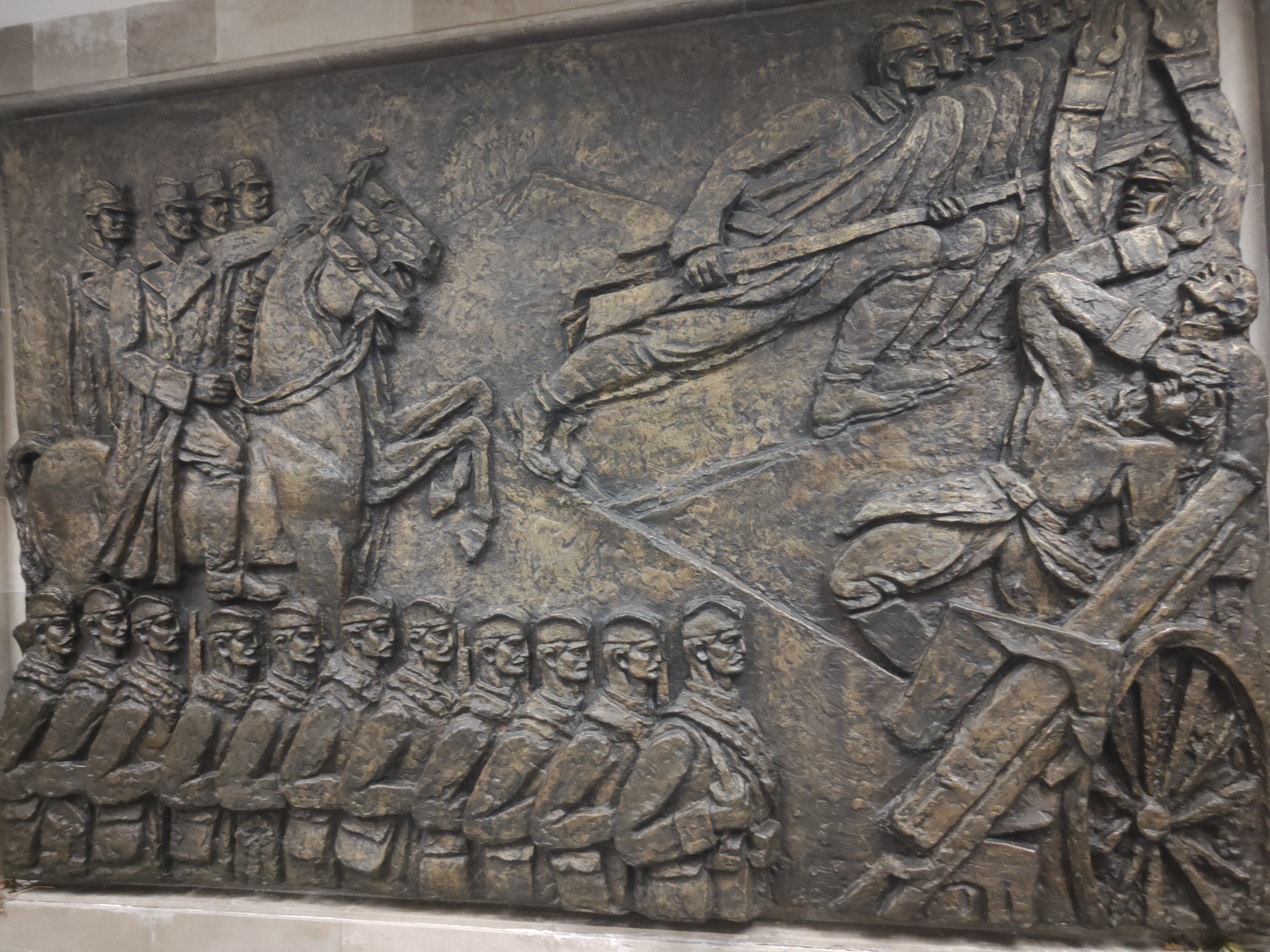

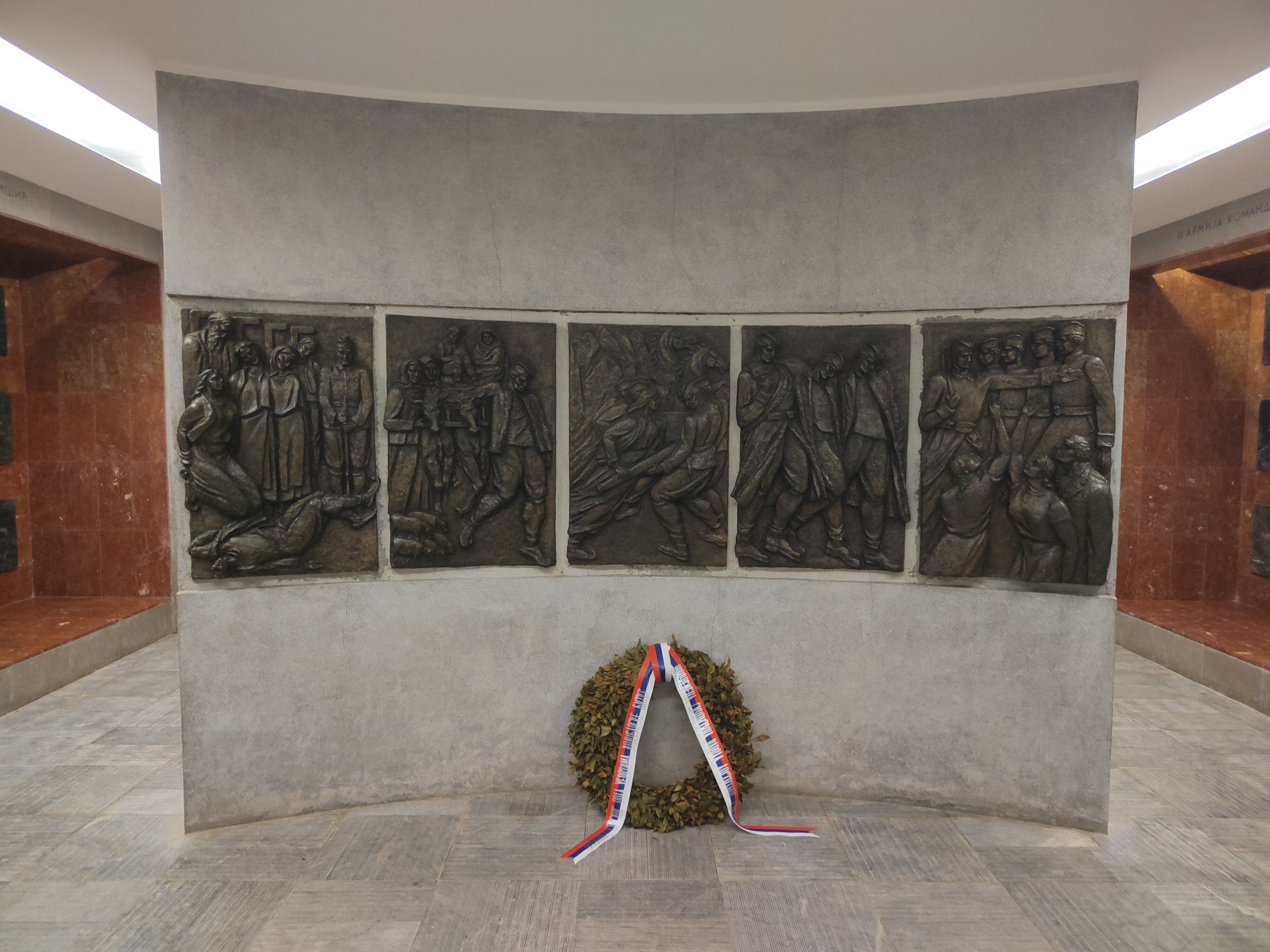

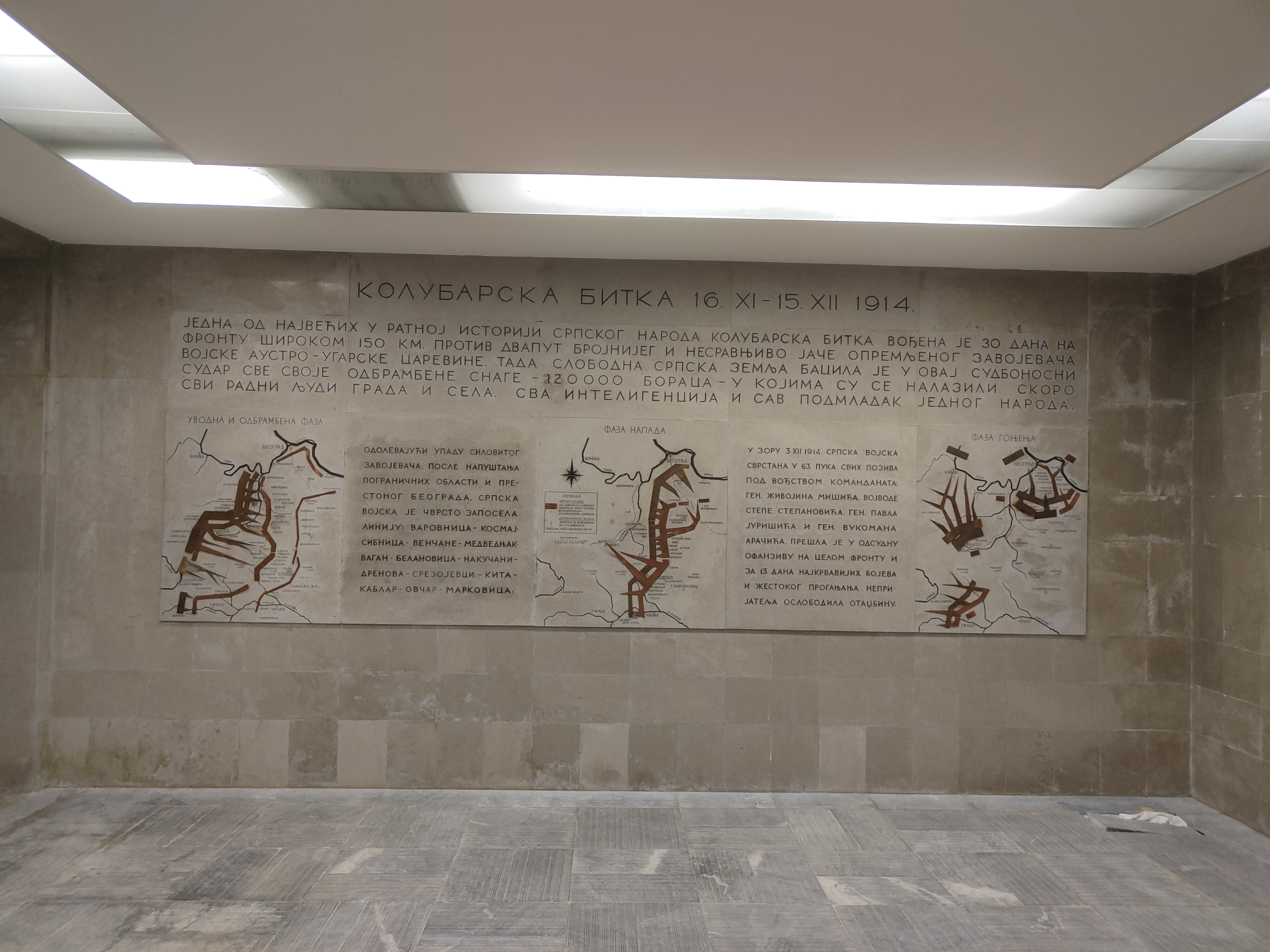
