= Brajkovac, Lazarevac =

Coordinates: 44°17′46″N 20°19′44″E

Brajkovac Брајковац
- Village
- Interactive map of Brajkovac
- Country: Serbia
- City: Belgrade
- Municipality: Lazarevac
- Time zone: UTC+1 (CET)
  - Summer (DST): UTC+2 (CEST)

Brajkovac, formerly Smrdljikovac, is a village situated in Lazarevac municipality in Serbia.

The village was active in the Serbian Revolution, being organized into the knežina (administrative unit) of Kačer during the First Serbian Uprising (1804–13). The bimbaša (captain) Uzun-Mirko (1782–1868) was from Smrdljikovac.
