= Arapovac, Serbia =

Arapovac
- Village
- Interactive map of Arapovac
- Coordinates: 44.4550°N 20.3881°E
- Country: Serbia
- Municipality: Lazarevac

Area
  - Total: 11.71 km^{2} (4.52 sq mi)
- Elevation: 207 m (679 ft)

Population (2011)
  - Total: 644
  - Density: 55.0/km^{2} (142/sq mi)
- Time zone: UTC+1 (CET)
  - Summer (DST): UTC+2 (CEST)

Arapovac (Serbian: Араповац) is a village situated in Lazarevac municipality in Serbia.

== History ==
Arapovac is located northeast of Lazarevac. Lazarevac is mentioned in the Arakan lists; in 1818 it had 30 houses and belonged to the Principality of Katić and formed one municipality with Junkovac and Sakulja and according to the 1921 census it had 124 houses with 902 inhabitants. Today's families are descendants of younger settlers.

According to tradition, Milan Čurukpara was the first to settle here. It is not known where he came from. He wandered and stayed here with his wife and children. He built a hut and settled down. One day, just before evening, an Arab came from somewhere, came in front of Milan's hut and stopped to spend the night at his place. Milan allows him and kills him overnight. It soon became known about this murder, and because an Arab was killed here, according to legend, the village was also called Arapovac. Another family that settled after Milan were some Gypsies Resetari, so called because they made grates. There are very many descendants of this family, and there are several other immigrant families whose origins are unknown. (data at the end of 1921).

The Church of the Ascension of the Lord in Arapovac is located here.
