= Baljevac =

Baljevac Баљевац
- Village
- Interactive map of Baljevac
- Coordinates: 44°34′06″N 20°16′12″E
- Country: Serbia
- Municipality: Obrenovac

Area
  - Total: 6.16 km^{2} (2.38 sq mi)
- Elevation: 106 m (348 ft)

Population (2011)
  - Total: 507
  - Density: 82.3/km^{2} (213/sq mi)
- Time zone: UTC+1 (CET)
  - Summer (DST): UTC+2 (CEST)

Baljevac (Serbian Cyrillic: Баљевац) is a village located in the municipality of Obrenovac, Belgrade, Serbia. As of 2011 census, it has a population of 507 inhabitants.
