= Vrbovno =

Coordinates: 44.5367°N 20.2825°E

- Village
- Interactive map of Vrbovno
- Country: Serbia
- Municipality: Lazarevac

Area
  - Total: 9.95 km^{2} (3.84 sq mi)
- Elevation: 145 m (476 ft)

Population (2011)
  - Total: 1,042
  - Density: 105/km^{2} (271/sq mi)
- Time zone: UTC+1 (CET)
  - Summer (DST): UTC+2 (CEST)

Vrbovno is a village situated in Lazarevac municipality in Serbia.
