= Cvetovac =

- Village
- Location within Serbia
- Coordinates: 44°29′N 20°16′E
- Country: Serbia
- Municipality: Lazarevac

Area
  - Total: 9.37 km^{2} (3.62 sq mi)
- Elevation: 84 m (276 ft)

Population (2011)
  - Total: 139
  - Density: 14.8/km^{2} (38.4/sq mi)
- Time zone: UTC+1 (CET)
  - Summer (DST): UTC+2 (CEST)

Cvetovac (Serbian: Цветовац) is a village situated in Lazarevac municipality in Serbia.
