= Dudovica =

Dudovica Дудовица
- Village
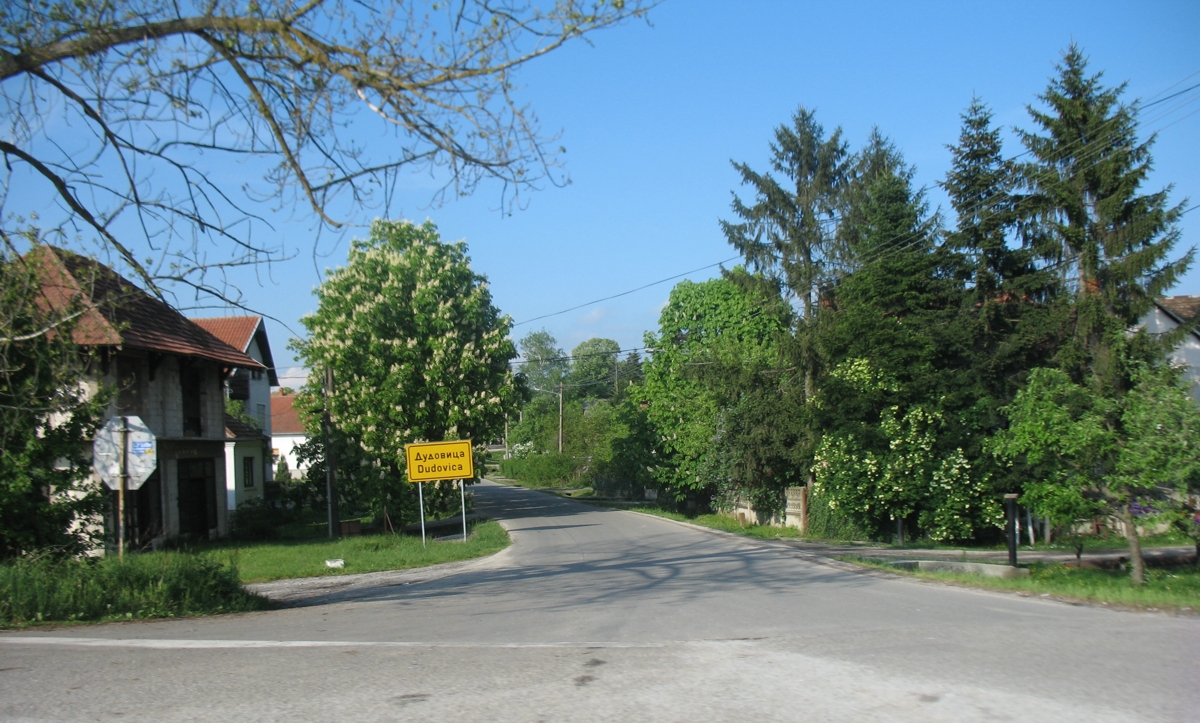
- Entrance to Dudovica

- Location in Serbia
- Coordinates: 44°17′51″N 20°15′50″E
- Country: Serbia
- Region: Šumadija
- District: Belgrade District
- Municipality: Lazarevac

Area
  - Total: 9.47 km^{2} (3.66 sq mi)
- Elevation: 146 m (479 ft)

Population (2011)
  - Total: 701
  - Density: 74.0/km^{2} (192/sq mi)
- Postal code: 11561
- Area code: 011

Dudovica (Serbian: Дудовица) is a small town in the Lazarevac municipality in the Belgrade District of Serbia. It was seat of a municipality abolished in the 1960s and added to the municipality of Lazarevac.

== Demographics ==
Historical population
Year	Pop.	±% p.a.
1948	854	—
1953	922	+1.54%
1961	923	+0.01%
1971	895	−0.31%
1981	818	−0.90%
1991	828	+0.12%
2002	777	−0.58%
2011	701	−1.14%

According to the 2011 census results, the village has 701 inhabitants.

=== Ethnic groups ===
The ethnic composition of the village (as of 2002 census):

- Serbs: 769 - 98,97%
- Yugoslavs: 4 - 0,51%
- Montenegrins: 3 - 0,38%
- Romanians: 1 - 0,12%
- Unknown: 0 - 0,0%

== Economy ==
Dudovica is known as the breeding area of the mangalica pigs.

== History ==
19 people from Dudovica were killed in the Jasenovac Camp in the World War II. All were ethnic Serbs.
