= Kruševica (Lazarevac) =

Kruševica Крушевица
- Village
- Location within Serbia
- Coordinates: 44°20′N 20°24′E
- Country: Serbia
- Municipality: Lazarevac
- Time zone: UTC+1 (CET)
  - Summer (DST): UTC+2 (CEST)

Kruševica (Serbian: Крушевица) is a village situated in Lazarevac municipality in Serbia.
