= Veliki Crljeni =

Veliki Crljeni Велики Црљени
- Village
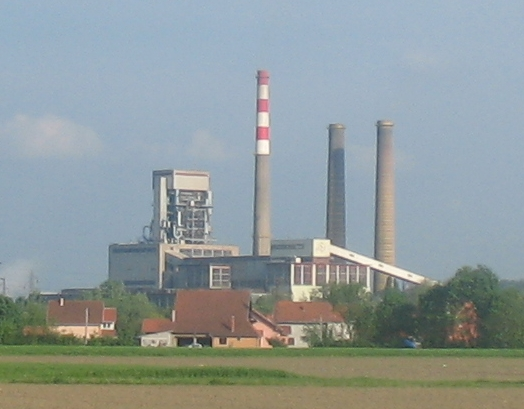
- TPP Kolubara near the village

- Location in Serbia
- Coordinates: 44°28′2″N 20°17′2″E
- Country: Serbia
- District: Belgrade District
- Municipality: Lazarevac

Area
  - Total: 17.39 km^{2} (6.71 sq mi)
- Elevation: 134 m (440 ft)

Population (2011)
  - Total: 4,318
  - Density: 248.3/km^{2} (643.1/sq mi)
- Time zone: UTC+1 (CET)
  - Summer (DST): UTC+2 (CEST)
- Postal code: 11563
- Area code: 011

Veliki Crljeni (Serbian Cyrillic: Велики Црљени) is a village in the Lazarevac municipality of Belgrade, the capital of Serbia. The population of the settlement is 4,318 people (2011 census). Near the village, there is a TPP Kolubara thermal power plant, and a nearby coal field, which provides most of the employment for the settlement's citizens.
