= Prkosava =

Coordinates: 44.3939°N 20.4253°E

- Village
- Interactive map of Prkosava
- Country: Serbia
- Municipality: Lazarevac
- Time zone: UTC+1 (CET)
  - Summer (DST): UTC+2 (CEST)

Prkosava is a village situated in Lazarevac municipality in Serbia.
