= Sokolovo (Lazarevac) =

Coordinates: 44.4867°N 20.3367°E

- Village
- Interactive map of Sokolovo
- Country: Serbia
- Municipality: Lazarevac

Area
  - Total: 6.34 km^{2} (2.45 sq mi)
- Elevation: 140 m (460 ft)

Population (2011)
  - Total: 562
  - Density: 88.6/km^{2} (230/sq mi)
- Time zone: UTC+1 (CET)
  - Summer (DST): UTC+2 (CEST)

Sokolovo is a village situated in Lazarevac municipality in Serbia.
