= Mirosaljci (Lazarevac) =

Coordinates: 44.4369°N 20.4153°E

- Village
- Interactive map of Mirosaljci
- Country: Serbia
- Municipality: Lazarevac
- Time zone: UTC+1 (CET)
  - Summer (DST): UTC+2 (CEST)

Mirosaljci (Serbian: Миросаљци) is a village situated in Lazarevac municipality in Serbia.
