= Barzilovica =

- Village
- Interactive map of Barzilovica
- Coordinates: 44.3317°N 20.3033°E
- Country: Serbia
- Municipality: Lazarevac

Area
  - Total: 17.46 km^{2} (6.74 sq mi)
- Elevation: 268 m (879 ft)

Population (2011)
  - Total: 844
  - Density: 48.3/km^{2} (125/sq mi)
- Time zone: UTC+1 (CET)
  - Summer (DST): UTC+2 (CEST)

Barzilovica (Serbian: Барзиловица) is a village situated in Lazarevac municipality in Serbia.
