= Bistrica (Lazarevac) =

Coordinates: 44°22′03″N 20°20′31″E

Bistrica Бистрица
- Village
- Interactive map of Bistrica
- Country: Serbia
- Municipality: Lazarevac

Area
  - Total: 9.54 km^{2} (3.68 sq mi)
- Elevation: 240 m (790 ft)

Population (2011)
  - Total: 441
  - Density: 46.2/km^{2} (120/sq mi)
- Time zone: UTC+1 (CET)
  - Summer (DST): UTC+2 (CEST)

Bistrica (Serbian: Бистрица) is a village situated in Lazarevac municipality in Serbia.
