= Dren (Lazarevac) =

Coordinates: 44.3808°N 20.3031°E

Dren Дрен
- Village
- Interactive map of Dren
- Country: Serbia
- Municipality: Lazarevac

Area
  - Total: 5.82 km^{2} (2.25 sq mi)
- Elevation: 274 m (899 ft)

Population (2011)
  - Total: 436
  - Density: 74.9/km^{2} (194/sq mi)
- Time zone: UTC+1 (CET)
  - Summer (DST): UTC+2 (CEST)

Dren (Serbian: Дрен) is a village situated in Lazarevac municipality in Serbia.
