= Stubica (Lazarevac) =

Coordinates: 44°21′26″N 20°16′43″E

Stubica Стубица
- Village
- Interactive map of Stubica
- Country: Serbia
- Municipality: Lazarevac
- Time zone: UTC+1 (CET)
  - Summer (DST): UTC+2 (CEST)

Stubica is a village situated in Lazarevac municipality in Serbia.
