= Strmovo (Bajina Bašta) =

- Village (Selo)
- Location within Serbia
- Coordinates: 44°05′N 19°33′E
- Country: Serbia
- District: Šumadija
- Municipality: Bajina Bašta

Population (2002)
  - Total: 582
- Time zone: UTC+1 (CET)
  - Summer (DST): UTC+2 (CEST)

Strmovo (Serbian Cyrillic: Стрмово) is a village in the municipality of Bajina Bašta, Serbia. According to the 2002 census, the village has a population of 582 people.
