= Šušnjar =

Coordinates: 44°21′48″N 20°14′42″E

Šušnjar Шушњар
- Village
- Interactive map of Šušnjar
- Country: Serbia
- Municipality: Lazarevac

Area
  - Total: 2.96 km^{2} (1.14 sq mi)
- Elevation: 182 m (597 ft)

Population (2011)
  - Total: 439
  - Density: 148/km^{2} (384/sq mi)
- Time zone: UTC+1 (CET)
  - Summer (DST): UTC+2 (CEST)

Šušnjar is a village situated in Lazarevac municipality in Serbia.
