= Čibutkovica =

Coordinates: 44.3189°N 20.2408°E

- Village
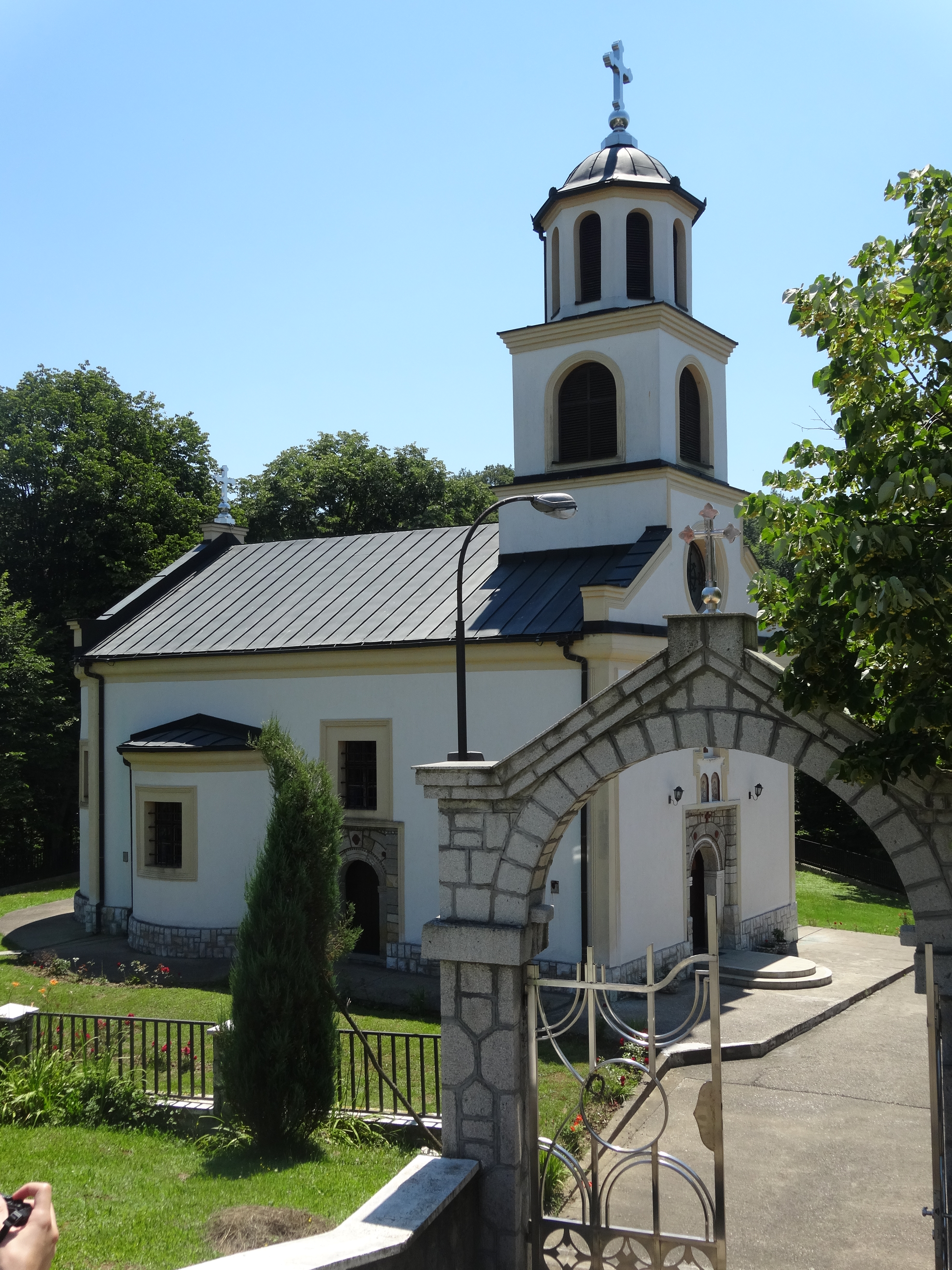
- Church of Saint George in Čibutkovica
- Interactive map of Čibutkovica
- Country: Serbia
- Municipality: Lazarevac

Area
  - Total: 19.39 km^{2} (7.49 sq mi)
- Elevation: 162 m (531 ft)

Population (2011)
  - Total: 1,175
  - Density: 60.60/km^{2} (156.9/sq mi)
- Time zone: UTC+1 (CET)
  - Summer (DST): UTC+2 (CEST)

Čibutkovica is a village situated in Lazarevac municipality in Serbia.
