= Strmovo (Lazarevac) =

Coordinates: 44°24′26″N 20°24′39″E

Strmovo Стрмово
- Village
- Interactive map of Strmovo
- Country: Serbia
- Time zone: UTC+1 (CET)
  - Summer (DST): UTC+2 (CEST)

Strmovo (Serbian Cyrillic: Стрмово) is a village situated in the Lazarevac municipality of Serbia.
