= Mali Crljeni =

- Village
- Location within Serbia
- Coordinates: 44°23′N 20°23′E
- Country: Serbia
- Municipality: Lazarevac
- Time zone: UTC+1 (CET)
  - Summer (DST): UTC+2 (CEST)

Mali Crljeni is a village situated in Lazarevac municipality in Serbia.
