= Burovo =

- Village
- Interactive map of Burovo
- Coordinates: 44.4011°N 20.2878°E
- Country: Serbia
- Municipality: Lazarevac

Area
  - Total: 3.35 km^{2} (1.29 sq mi)
- Elevation: 193 m (633 ft)

Population (2011)
  - Total: 448
  - Density: 134/km^{2} (346/sq mi)
- Time zone: UTC+1 (CET)
  - Summer (DST): UTC+2 (CEST)

Burovo is a village situated in Lazarevac municipality in Serbia.
