= Vreoci =

- Village
- Location within Serbia
- Coordinates: 44°27′N 20°17′E
- Country: Serbia

Area
  - Total: 17.11 km^{2} (6.61 sq mi)
- Elevation: 137 m (449 ft)

Population (2011)
  - Total: 2,559
  - Density: 149.6/km^{2} (387.4/sq mi)
- Time zone: UTC+1 (CET)
  - Summer (DST): UTC+2 (CEST)

Vreoci (Serbian Cyrillic: Вреоци) is a suburban neighborhood in Belgrade, Serbia. It is located in Belgrade's municipality of Lazarevac.
