= Lazarevac =

Lazarevac Лазаревац (Serbian)
- Municipality
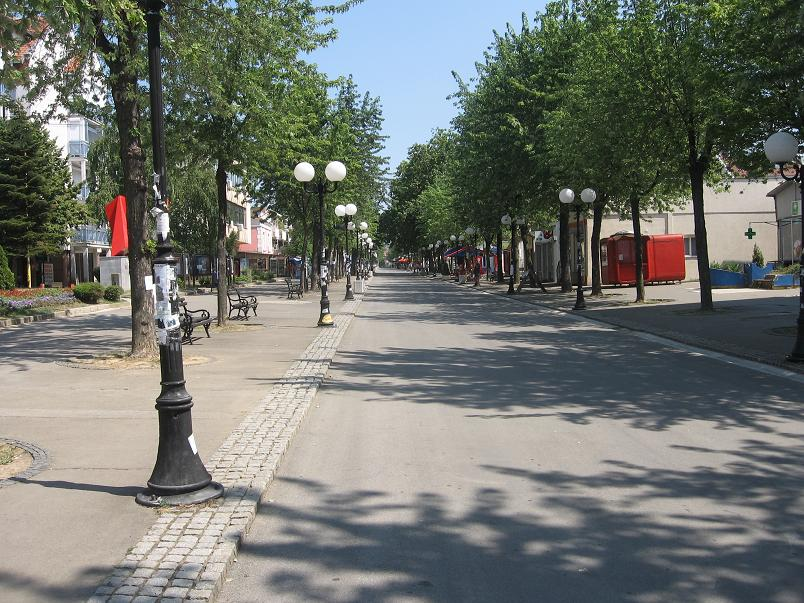
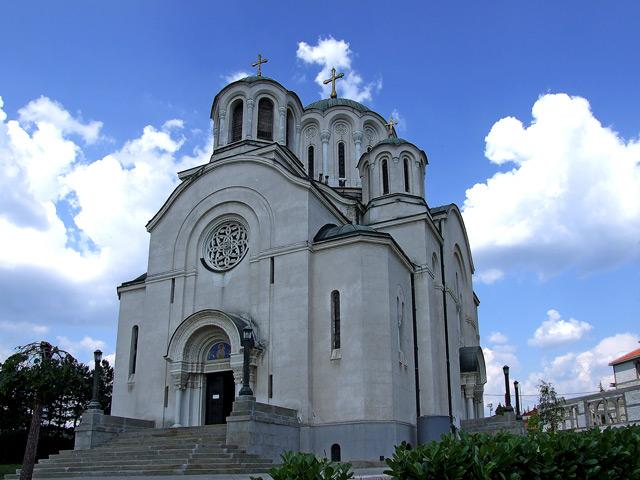
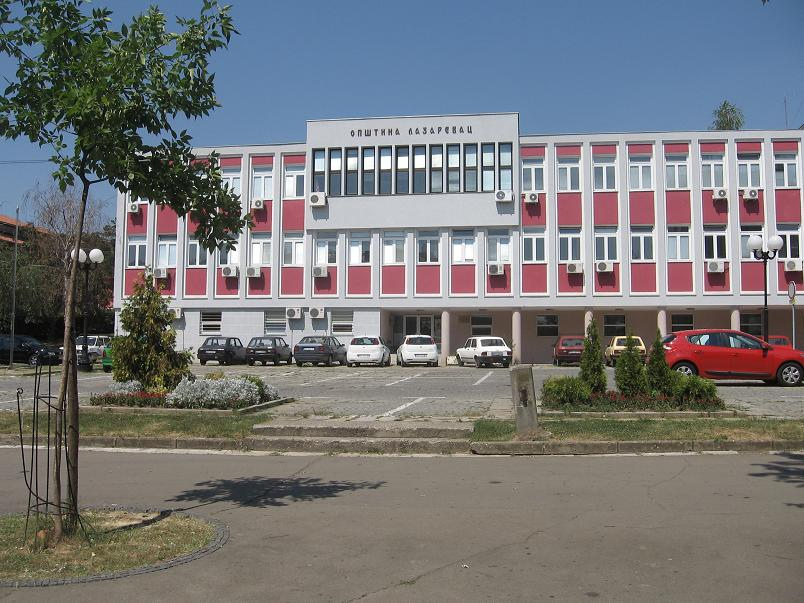
- From top: Town center promenade, Memorial Church of St. Demetrius, Municipal Building

- Coat of arms

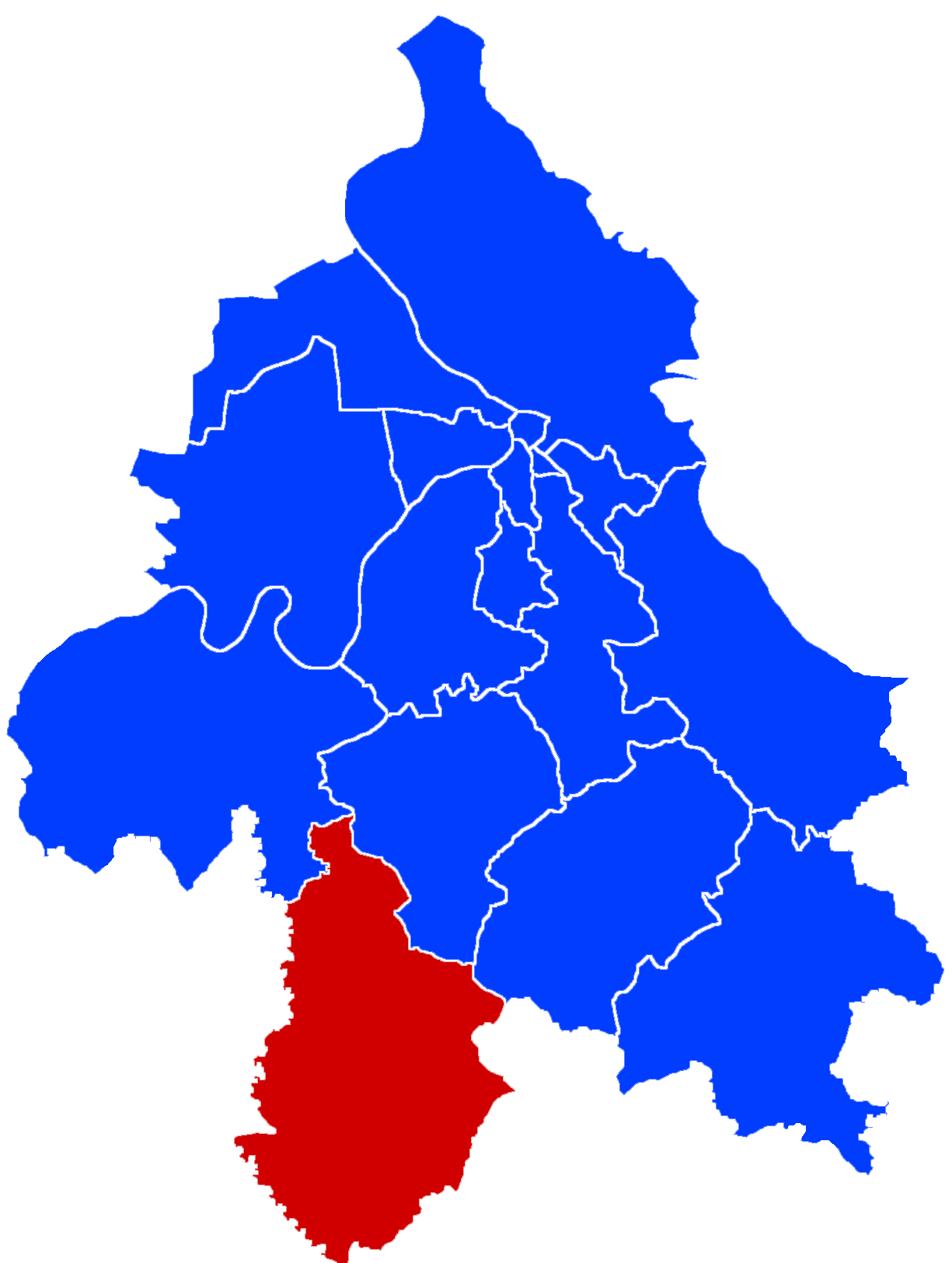
- Location of Lazarevac within the city of Belgrade
- Coordinates: 44°22′N 20°15′E
- Country: Serbia
- City: Belgrade
- Settlements: 34

Government
  - Mayor: Tomislav Rikanović (SNS)

Area
  - Urban: 17.87 km^{2} (6.90 sq mi)
  - Municipality: 382.77 km^{2} (147.79 sq mi)
- Elevation: 161 m (528 ft)

Population (2022 census)
  - Urban: 27,635
  - Urban density: 1,546/km^{2} (4,005/sq mi)
  - Municipality: 55,146
  - Municipality density: 144.07/km^{2} (373.14/sq mi)
- Time zone: UTC+1 (CET)
  - Summer (DST): UTC+2 (CEST)
- Postal code: 11550
- Area code: +381(0)11
- ISO 3166 code: SRB
- Car plates: BG
- Website: www.lazarevac.rs

Lazarevac (Serbian Cyrillic: Лазаревац, pronounced [lazareʋat͡s]) is a municipality of the city of Belgrade. As of 2022, the town has a total population of 27,635 inhabitants, while the municipal area has a total of 55,146 inhabitants.

Its name stems from the name of medieval Serbian ruler Prince Lazar Hrebeljanović.

== History ==
During the Interbellum, there was an auxiliary military airfield in Lazarevac, part of the air defense of the state capital, Belgrade.

On 7 April 1941, during the German bombing of Belgrade, air force unit "Arad", employing 60 Štuka airplanes bombed the airfield in an effort to destroy as many Yugoslav planes as possible. A majority of planes, used for training flights, were either destroyed or demolished; a total of nine airmen were killed in action. The Memorial Church of St.Demetrius, with ossuary, was also damaged in the attack.

The area of the former airfield is today occupied by the health center "Dr Đorđe Kovačević" and the Special Hospital for the endemic nephropathy, but neither the location nor the graves are marked in memory of the 1941 events. In 1984 one of the town streets was named after the killed airmen, albeit erroneously: instead of "Nine airmen", the street was named "Six airmen". In January 2018, dedication of the memorial plaque on the location of the former airfield was announced.

In 1971, the municipality of Lazarevac, along with Mladenovac, was annexed to the city of Belgrade.

== Settlements ==
Aside from the town of Lazarevac, the municipality comprises the following settlements:

- Arapovac
- Barzilovica
- Baroševac
- Bistrica
- Brajkovac
- Burovo
- Cvetovac
- Čibutkovica
- Dren
- Dudovica
- Kruševica
- Junkovac
- Leskovac
- Lukavica
- Mali Crljeni
- Medoševac
- Mirosaljci
- Petka
- Prkosava
- Rudovci
- Sokolovo
- Stepojevac
- Strmovo
- Stubica
- Šopić
- Šušnjar
- Trbušnica
- Veliki Crljeni
- Vrbovno
- Vreoci
- Zeoke
- Županjac

The village of Sakulja was resettled in 1984. It was officially abolished in October 2019 and its territory was annexed to the neighboring Junkovac.

== Demographics ==
Historical population
Year	Pop.	±%
1948	3,614	—
1953	3,970	+9.9%
1961	5,905	+48.7%
1971	7,994	+35.4%
1981	13,184	+64.9%
1991	21,978	+66.7%
2002	22,732	+3.4%
2011	26,006	+14.4%
2022	27,635	+6.3%

As of the 2022 census, the municipality of Lazarevac has a total population of 55,146, while the settlement has a population of 27,635.

=== Ethnic groups ===
The ethnic composition of the municipality (as of 2022):

Ethnic group	Population
Serbs	51,582
Romani	668
Yugoslavs	83
Macedonians	55
Montenegrins	52
Russians	29
Croats	28
Muslims	19
Romanians	16
Others	141
Undeclared/Unknown	2,473
Total	55,146

== Economy ==
Lazarevac is the home to the Serbian largest coal mining and smelting complex Kolubara, and TPP Kolubara.

The following table gives a preview of total number of registered people employed in legal entities per their core activity (as of 2022):

Activity	Total
Agriculture, forestry and fishing	30
Mining and quarrying	8,187
Manufacturing	2,636
Electricity, gas, steam and air conditioning supply	742
Water supply; sewerage, waste management and remediation activities	574
Construction	615
Wholesale and retail trade, repair of motor vehicles and motorcycles	2,068
Transportation and storage	599
Accommodation and food services	676
Information and communication	107
Financial and insurance activities	171
Real estate activities	8
Professional, scientific and technical activities	398
Administrative and support service activities	1,945
Public administration and defense; compulsory social security	538
Education	1,259
Human health and social work activities	650
Arts, entertainment and recreation	214
Other service activities	181
Individual agricultural workers	54
Total	21,651

== Education ==
The town has 3 elementary schools, OŠ Vojislav Voka Savić, OŠ Dule Karaklajić, and OŠ Knez Lazar, which together have about 3000 students. There are also 2 high schools, Kolubara Technical School and the Lazarevac Gymnasium.

== Sports ==
FK Kolubara is the local football club, they played the 2021–22 and 22-23 seasons in the Serbian top tier, the SuperLiga.

== Attractions ==
One of the main attractions in Lazarevac is the Church of St. Demetrius. It is essentially a mausoleum, a main memorial room, built in the memory of Serbian and Austro-Hungarian army soldiers that were killed at the Battle of Kolubara. 40,000 killed soldiers, both Serbian and Austro-Hungarian, were buried in the memorial ossuary of the church's crypt. It is the largest World War I necropolis in Serbia. "The Committee to raise a memorial church and crypt in Lazarevac" was established in order the build the church. In the 1937 Committee was disbanded and "The Society for raising a memorial church with crypt in Lazarevac" was formed instead, led by a priest Borivoje Đorđević. Finally, the temple was built by the Russian émigré architect Ivan Afanasjevič Rik between 1938 and 1941. In the architectural and urban environment of Lazarevac, the temple stands as a significant achievement of interwar Serbian church architecture.

There is also a Modern gallery in the town, with the rich collection of paintings, graphics and sculptures, the "Kamengrad" ("Stoneville"), a park enriched with the stone sculptures chiseled by Bogosav Živković, and a Cultural Center. Outside of the town there are three wooden churches from the 18th century, a spring of natural mineral water and several archaeological finds. Other touristic features in the vicinity of Lazarevac include the Ćelije monastery and the Vrače hill, where Dimitrije Tucović, Serbian socialist theorist, was killed in November 1914 during the Battle of Kolubara.

In Baroševac grow a grove of giant sequoia trees which were brought from California as a part of a program to find species for re-foresting the barren bottom of the coal mines' emptied parts. The trees had only reached a height of 30m as of 2011, and are continuing to be studied as they develop in this manufactured habitat.

There is a game hunting ground "Kolubara" in the municipality.

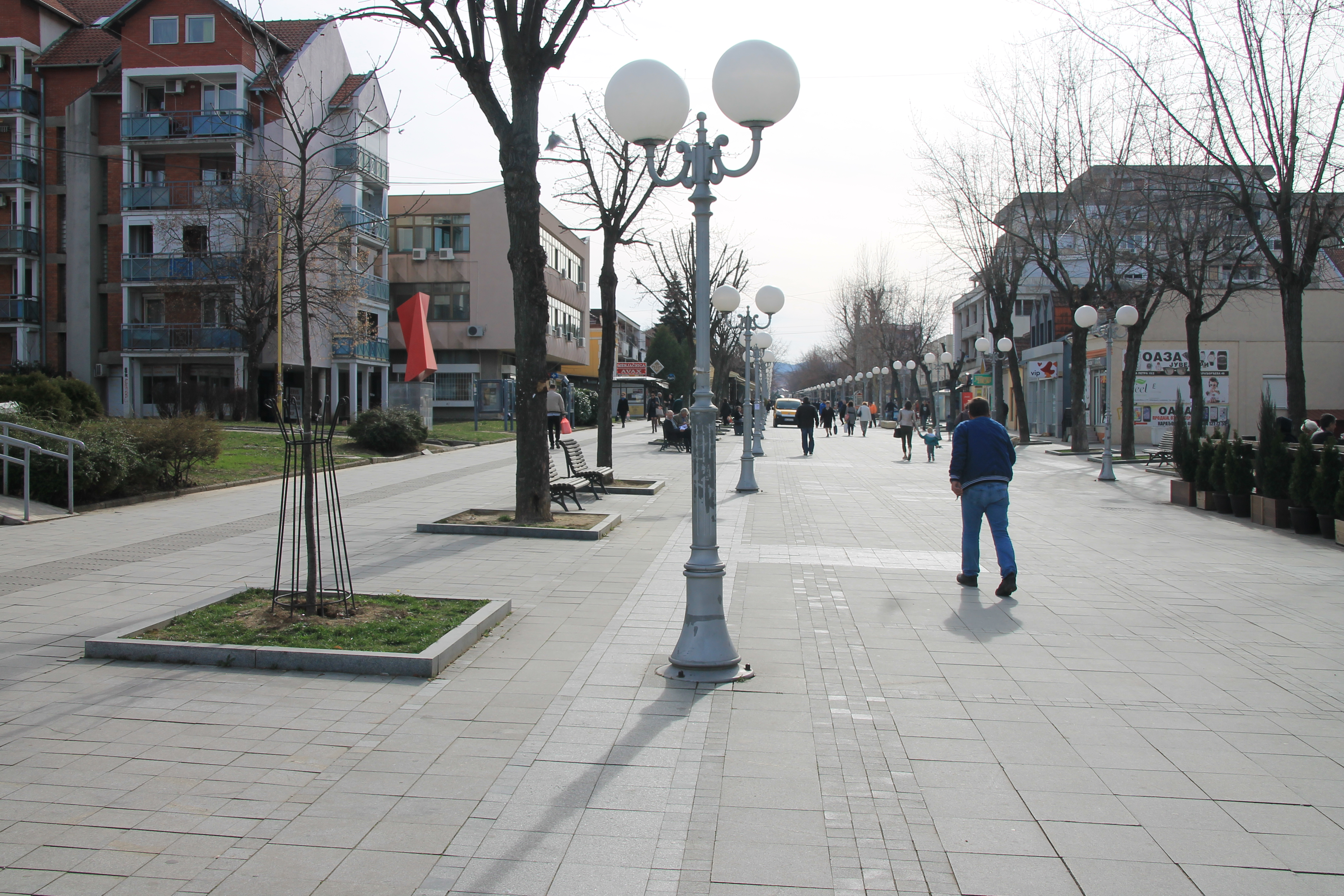
Town center street promenade

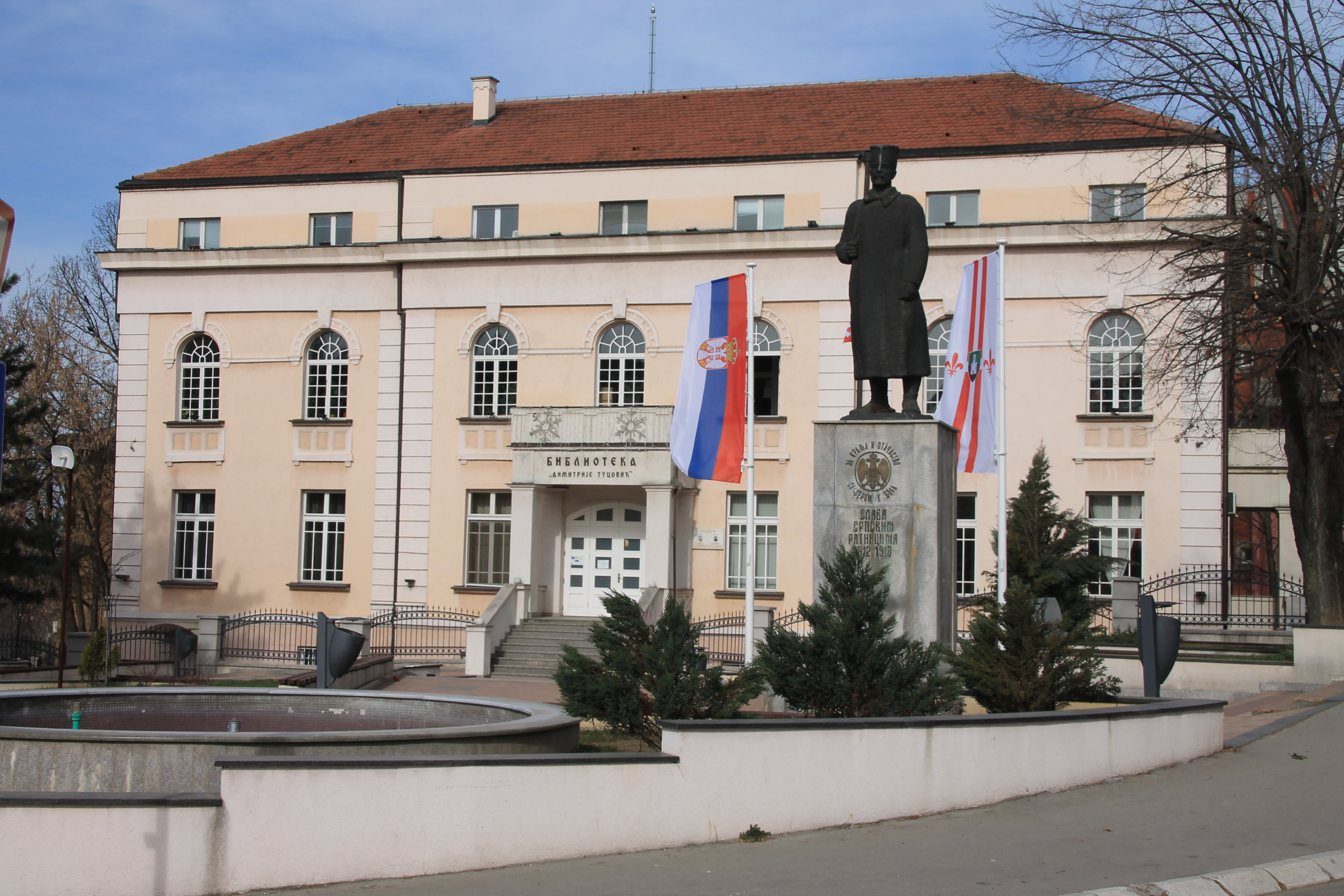
Dimitrije Tucović Library

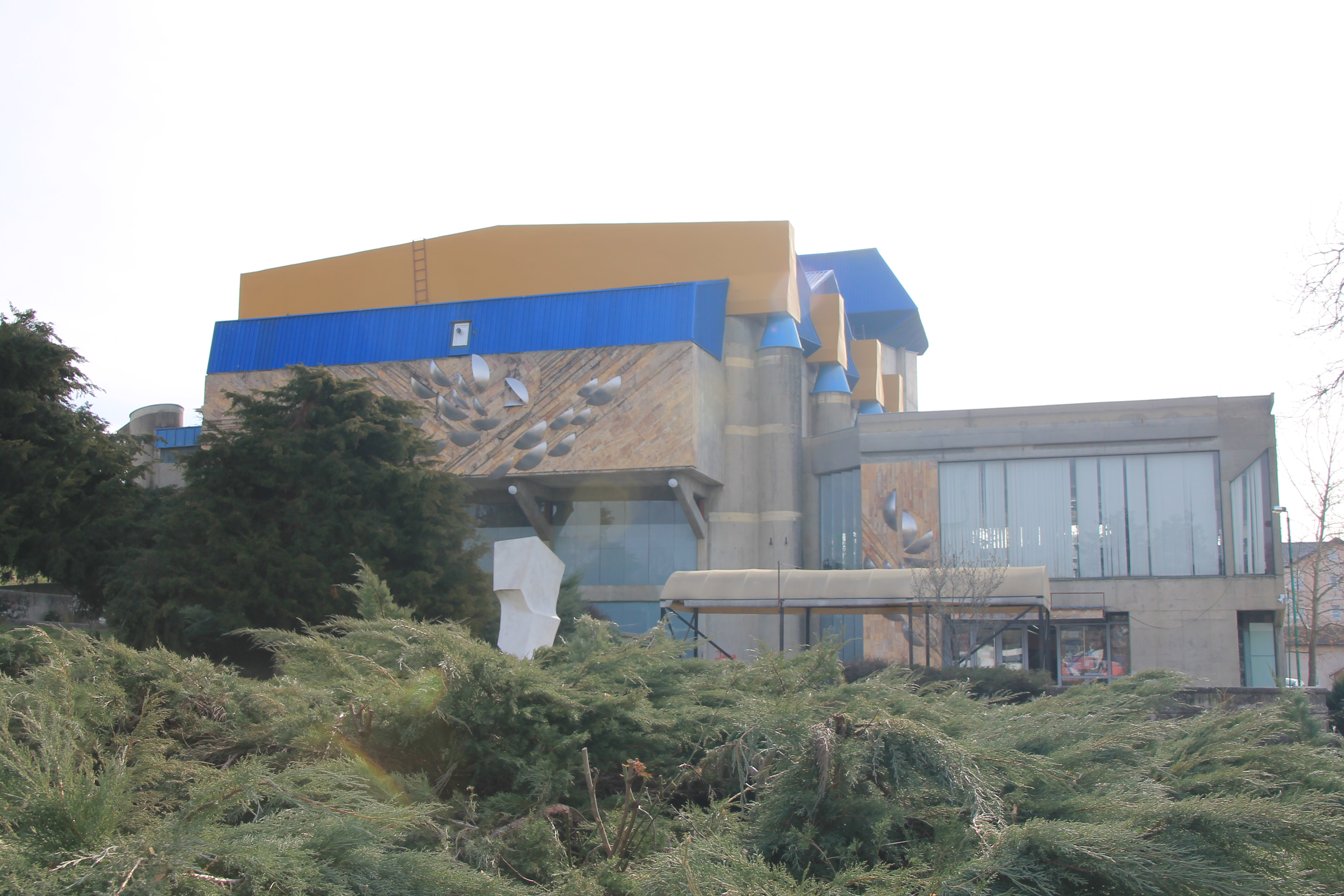
Culture center

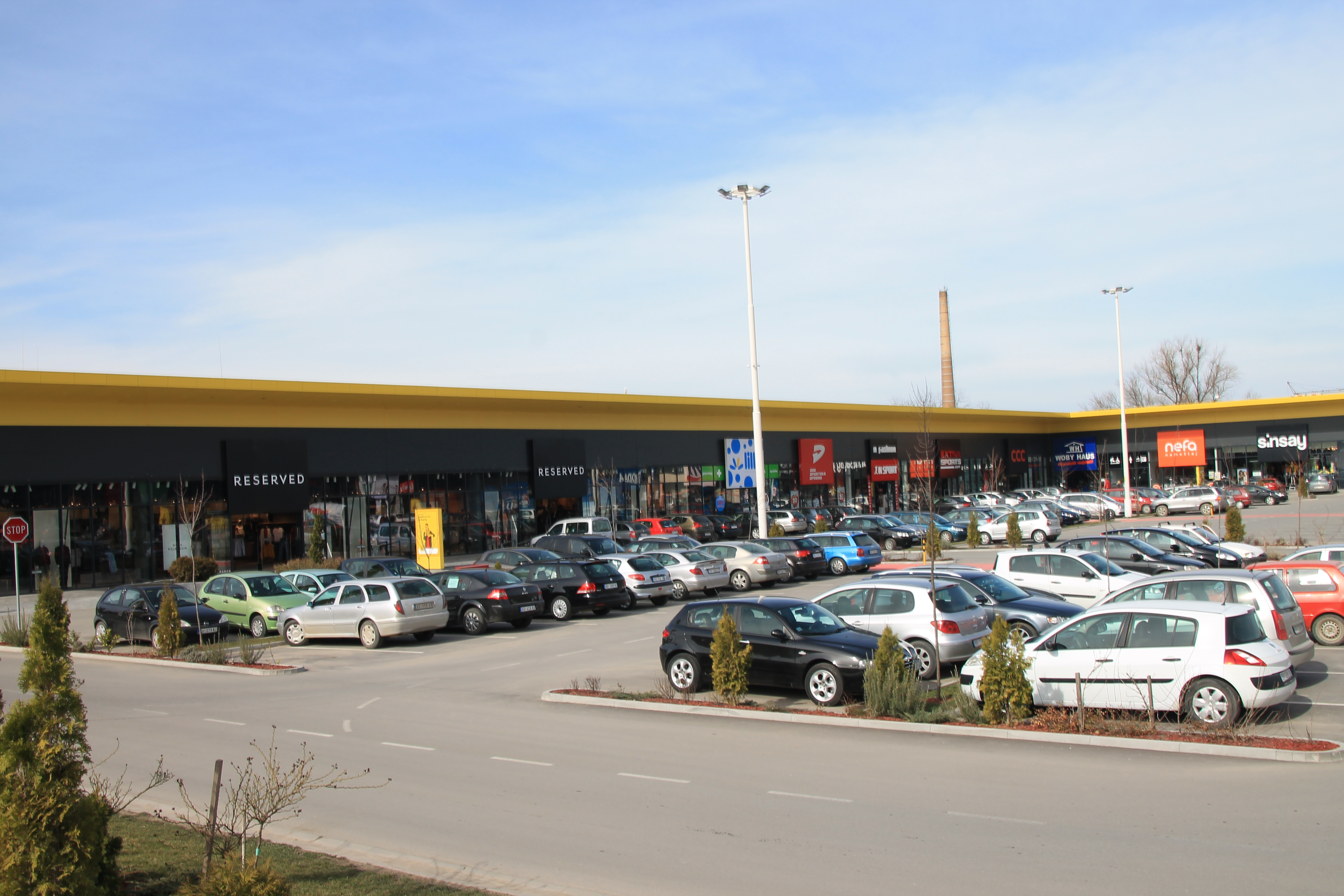
Retail park

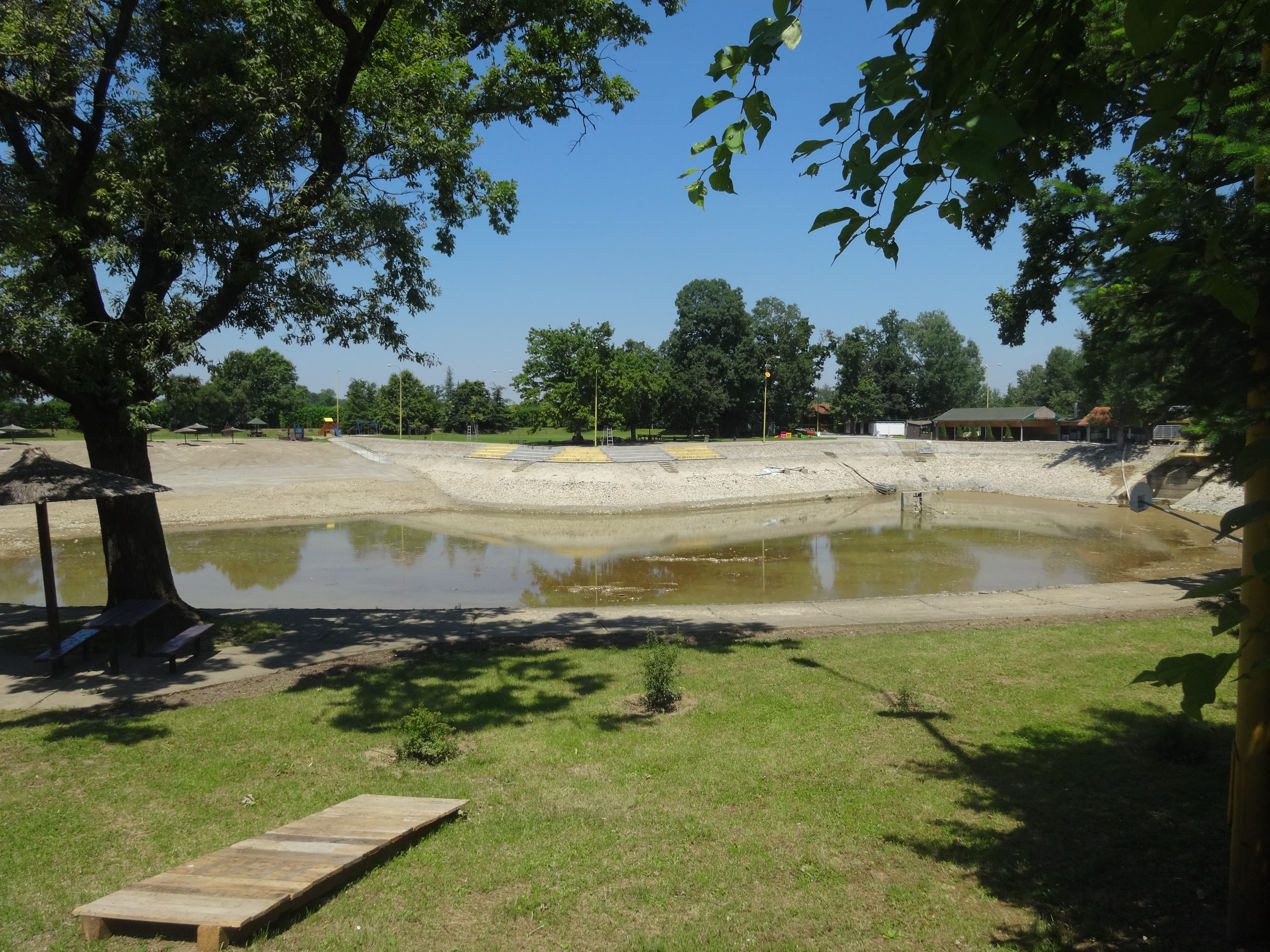
Lake Očaga

== See also ==
- Subdivisions of Belgrade
- List of Belgrade neighbourhoods and suburbs
