= Trbušnica (Lazarevac) =

Coordinates: 44°21′13″N 20°21′20″E

- Village
- Interactive map of Trbušnica
- Country: Serbia
- Municipality: Lazarevac
- Time zone: UTC+1 (CET)
  - Summer (DST): UTC+2 (CEST)

Trbušnica (Serbian: Трбушница) is a village situated in Lazarevac municipality in Serbia.
