= Baroševac =

Coordinates: 44.3986°N 20.3689°E

- Village
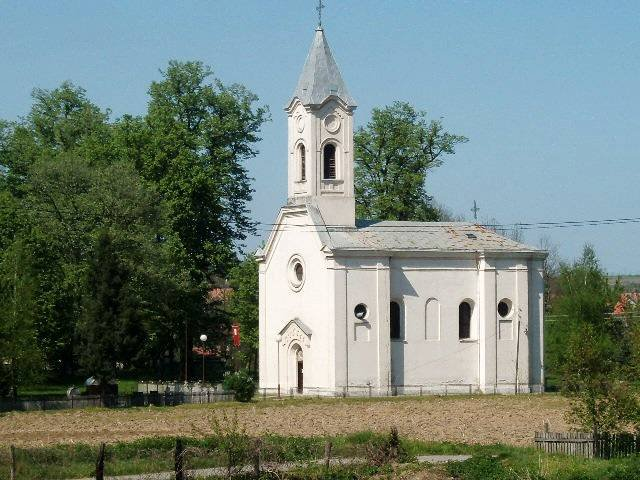
- Crkva Barosevac
- Interactive map of Baroševac
- Country: Serbia
- Municipality: Lazarevac

Area
  - Total: 12.88 km^{2} (4.97 sq mi)
- Elevation: 138 m (453 ft)

Population (2011)
  - Total: 1,054
  - Density: 81.83/km^{2} (211.9/sq mi)
- Time zone: UTC+1 (CET)
  - Summer (DST): UTC+2 (CEST)

Baroševac (Serbian: Барошевац) is a village situated in Lazarevac municipality in Serbia.
