= Županjac =

Županjac Жупањац
- Village
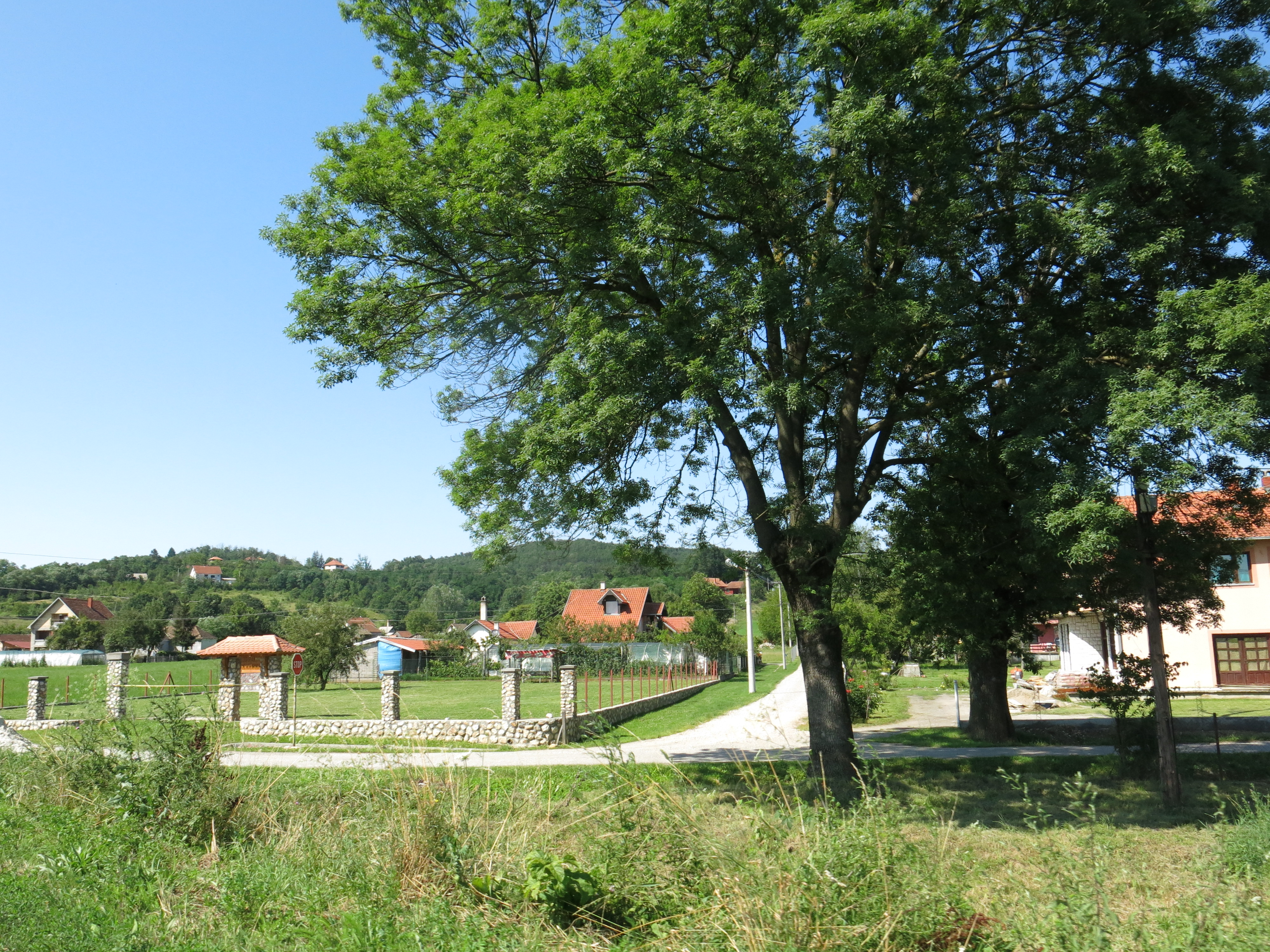

- Location in Serbia
- Coordinates: 44°20′09″N 20°12′25″E
- Country: Serbia
- Region: Šumadija
- District: City of Belgrade
- Municipality: Lazarevac

Area
  - Total: 8.23 km^{2} (3.18 sq mi)
- Elevation: 166 m (545 ft)

Population (2011)
  - Total: 508
  - Density: 61.7/km^{2} (160/sq mi)
- Area code: 011

Županjac (Serbian Cyrillic: Жупањац) is a village in the municipality of Lazarevac, Serbia. According to the 2002 census, the village has a population of 582 people.
