= Zeoke (Lazarevac) =

Coordinates: 44.4097°N 20.3267°E

Zeoke Зеоке
- Village
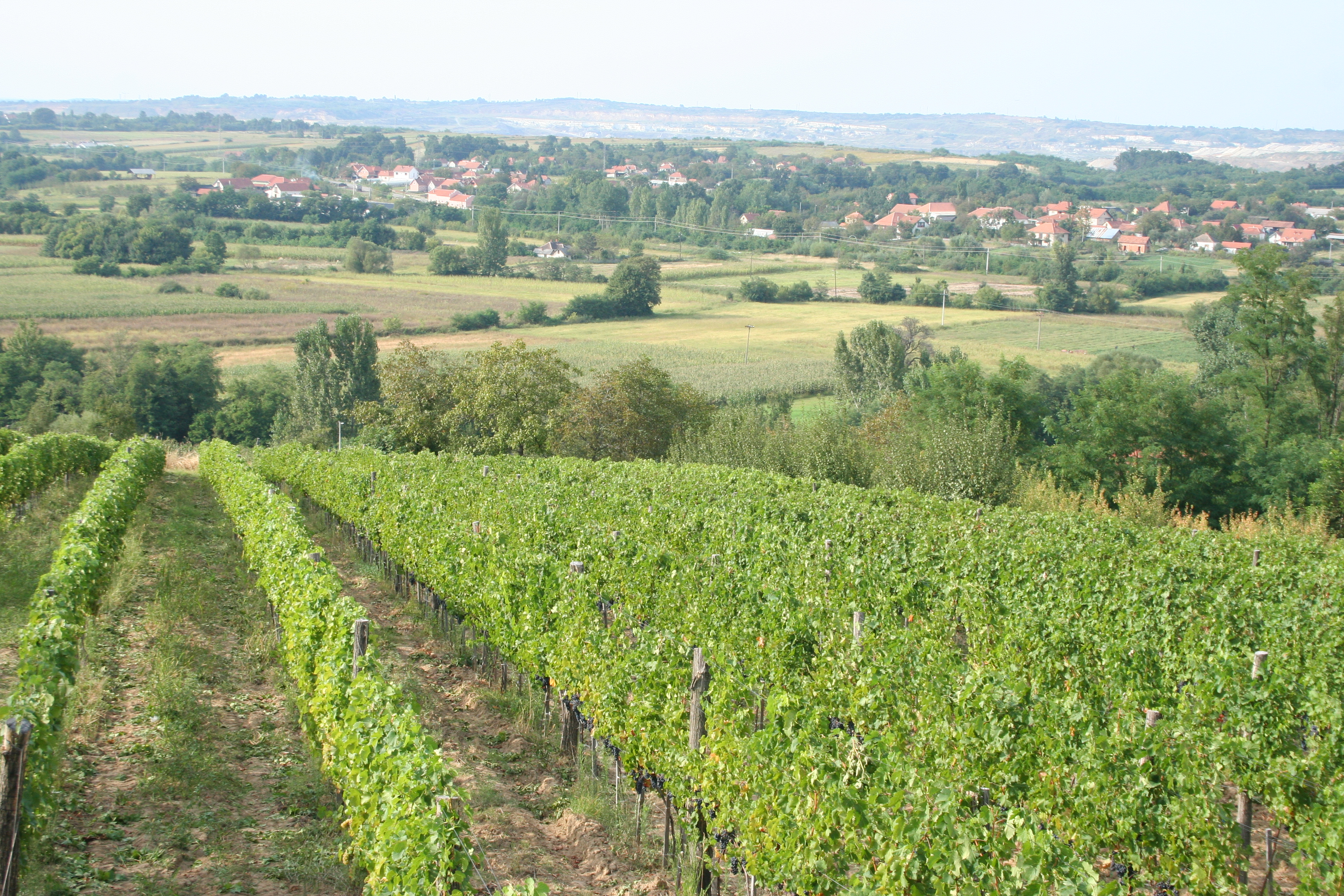
- Interactive map of Zeoke
- Country: Serbia
- Municipality: Lazarevac

Area
  - Total: 10.24 km^{2} (3.95 sq mi)
- Elevation: 134 m (440 ft)

Population (2011)
  - Total: 722
  - Density: 70.5/km^{2} (183/sq mi)
- Time zone: UTC+1 (CET)
  - Summer (DST): UTC+2 (CEST)

Zeoke is a village situated in Lazarevac municipality in Serbia. It is considered a part of the Belgrade-Metropolitan area.
