= Rudovci =

Rudovci Рудовци
- Village
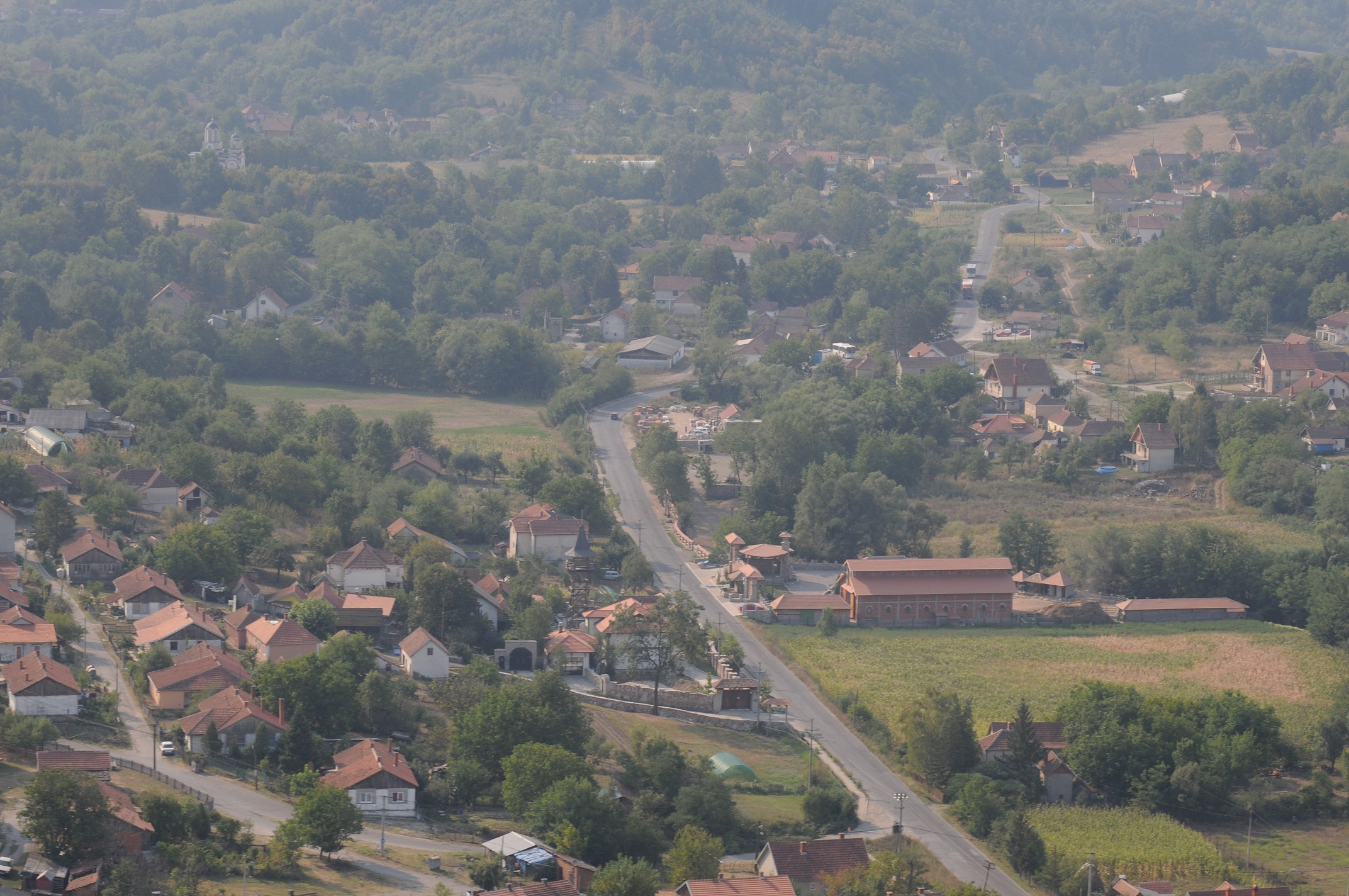

- Location within Serbia
- Coordinates: 44°22′N 20°25′E
- Country: Serbia
- District: Belgrade
- Municipality: Lazarevac

Population (2011)
  - Total: 1,620
- Time zone: UTC+1 (CET)
  - Summer (DST): UTC+2 (CEST)
- Postal code: 11566
- Area code: 011
- Vehicle registration: BG

Rudovci (Serbian Cyrillic: Рудовци) is a suburban settlement of Belgrade, the capital of Serbia. It is situated in the Lazarevac municipality. The population of the settlement is 1,620 people (2011 census).
