= Medoševac (Lazarevac) =

Coordinates: 44.4253°N 20.3047°E

Medoševac Медошевац
- Village
- Interactive map of Medoševac
- Country: Serbia
- Municipality: Lazarevac

Area
  - Total: 10.34 km^{2} (3.99 sq mi)
- Elevation: 158 m (518 ft)

Population (2011)
  - Total: 642
  - Density: 62.1/km^{2} (161/sq mi)
- Time zone: UTC+1 (CET)
  - Summer (DST): UTC+2 (CEST)

Medoševac (Serbian: Медошевац) is a village situated in Lazarevac municipality in Serbia.
