= Junkovac (Lazarevac) =

Junkovac Јунковац
- Village
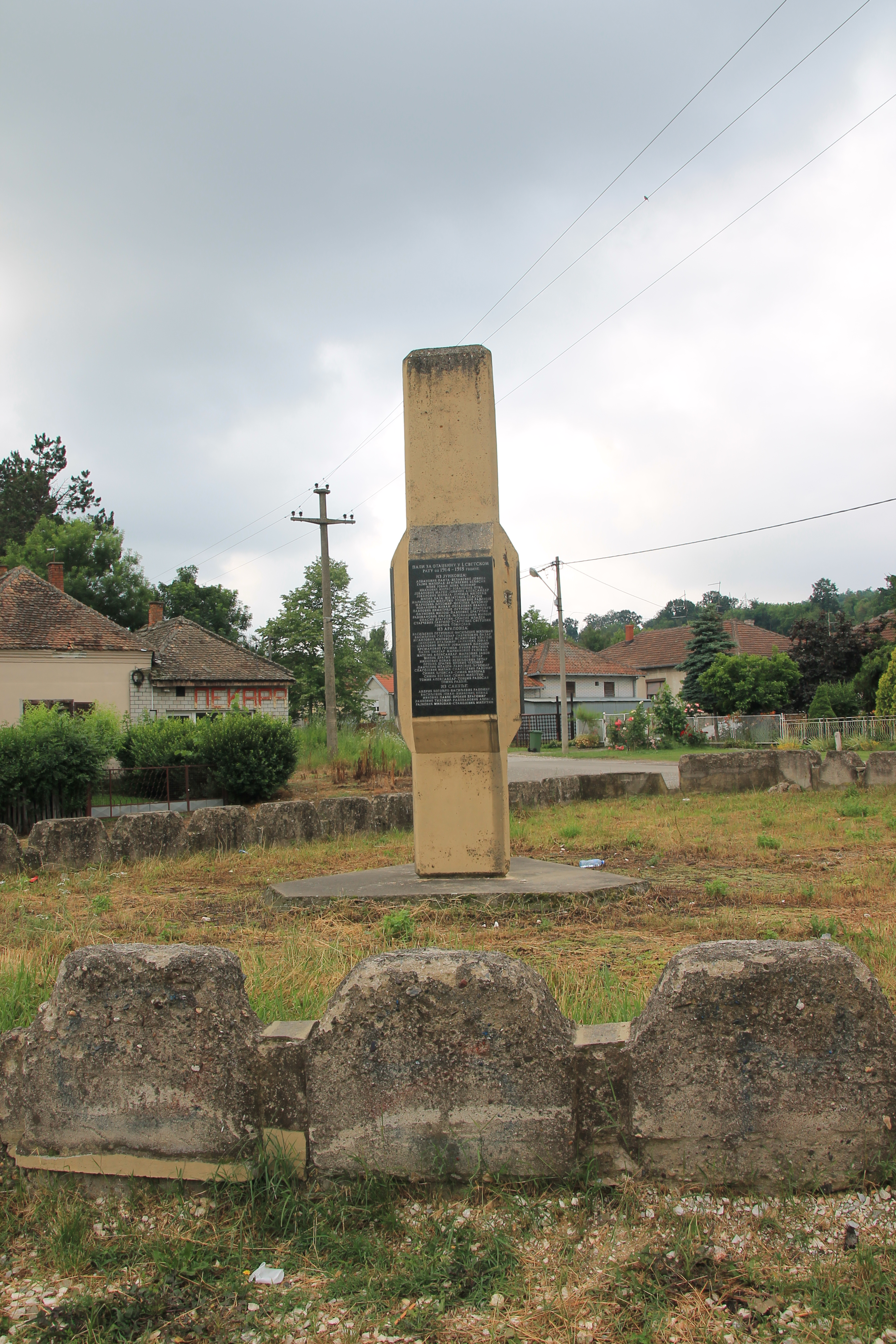
- Monument in Junkovac
- Interactive map of Junkovac
- Coordinates: 44°26′51″N 20°21′07″E
- Country: Serbia
- District: Belgrade
- Municipality: Lazarevac
- Elevation: 122 m (400 ft)

Population (2011)
  - Total: 834
- Time zone: UTC+1 (CET)
  - Summer (DST): UTC+2 (CEST)
- Postal code: 11562

Junkovac (Serbian: Јунковац) is a village located in the municipality of Lazarevac, Belgrade, Serbia. As of 2011 census, it has a population of 834 inhabitants.

== History ==
In October 2019, he village of Sakulja (which was resettled in 1984) was officially abolished in October 2019 and its territory was annexed to the neighboring Junkovac.
