= Aleksandar Zega =

Serbian chemist (1860–1928)

Aleksandar Zega (29 May 1860 – 29 March 1928) was a Serbian chemist. He held professional positions in the Government, Municipal and Customs Laboratories, and made a number of applied and theoretical contributions. He dealt with analytical and organic chemistry, specifically the analysis of mineral waters and foodstuffs. He studied and worked in Switzerland, however he wrote and published most of his works during his work and stay in Serbia. He was a contemporary of Milorad Z. Jovičić (1868–1937) and Wladimir Brunetti.

== Biography ==
Zega was born on 29 May 1860 in Novo Selo to landowners Jelena and Kosta Zega. He finished primary school in his hometown and attended high school in Pančevo. He attended universities in Vienna and Zürich, graduating from the latter in 1879. He was awarded a canton of Zürich scholarship, which enabled him to continue his chemistry studies at the ETHZ and the University of Zurich along with other chemists Viktor Meyer and Georg Lunge. After passing the graduation exam, he became an assistant in the chemical laboratory at the University of Zurich, where he studied and worked for the next four years. In 1885, he defended his doctoral dissertation, entitled Über die Einwirkung des para-Toluidins auf Resorcin und Hydrochinon - über die Einwirkungdes Anilins auf Orcin (transl. About the action of para-toluidine on resorcinol and hydroquinone – about the action of aniline on orcin). From 1885 to 1886, he worked as an assistant to the town chemist Otto Kriper in Wuppertal.

In early 1887, he went to Belgrade and applied to the Minister of Education for a job at the high school. In February 1887, the Education Council concluded that Alexander was sufficiently qualified to teach the natural sciences, especially chemistry and chemical technology, in which areas he had received a doctorate.

In the meantime, he returned to Switzerland, where he got a job as an assistant in a chemical agricultural station, turning down an invitation to work at the high school in Pirot. In early 1888, he again sought a job as a high school teacher, without success, which is why he continued to work in Switzerland until 1891. In the same year, he returned to Belgrade at the municipality's invitation to establish a chemical laboratory. Due to material reasons, the Belgrade municipality could not establish a laboratory, so Zega worked as a municipal chemist in the State Chemical Laboratory from 1891 to 1906. In 1894, Zega applied for the position of professor of chemistry and chemical technology at the Velika škola but Marko Leko was chosen instead. He worked as a part-time manager of the chemical laboratory of the Customs House on the Sava from 1906 to 1909. At the beginning of 1909, the Belgrade municipality opened its laboratory in which Zega studied the effects of aniline on orcinol at the beginning of World War I.

During the war, he analyzed food and well water. He stayed in Ćuprija for a short time as a refugee, but returned to Belgrade at the beginning of 1916, where, with the permission of the occupiers, he managed to equip a chemical laboratory for testing food. During the construction of the Belgrade water supply system, he spent days with experts and workers and helped with the correction of all chemical and technical deficiencies. He also took samples from wells and filters and then performed chemical and bacteriological analyses. He tried to regularly perform bacteriological and hygienic analyses of water samples from Makiš, but also well water. After his release, he worked in the Municipal Chemical Laboratory until 1922, and then transferred to the Customs Laboratory, where he worked until 1925. In November 1926, he retired but was also transferred to the civil service as the head of the chemical laboratory within the Sava Customs House. In March 1927, he became seriously ill and retired. He died on 29 March 1928, in Belgrade at the age of 68.

Zega published about thirty scientific and professional papers in foreign and domestic journals. The papers were based on areas such as analytical and organic chemistry as well as water and food analysis. He perfected and simplified many of the methods used in such research.

Zega was one of the founders of the Serbian Chemical Society (1897); from 1907 to 1912 he was vice-president, and from 1912 to 1927 he was the president of the society.

He was an active athlete and the founder of various sports clubs such as riding, skating, cycling, wrestling, etc. He was noted as an excellent shooter, swimmer, gymnast, and swordsman. He was a member of the patriotic Društvo "Dušan Silni", "Dušan the Mighty" Society.

== Works ==
Zega's papers can be divided into four groups: analytical chemistry, organic chemistry, food analysis, and mineral water analysis.

He published 38 papers during his work at the State Chemical Laboratory.

=== Papers in the field of analytical chemistry ===
During his research, Zega strived to find methods to test foodstuffs that could be performed with simpler equipment while obtaining results that would meet strict European standards. He found a much simpler method for determining the fatty acids of tallow, butter, margarine, and lard dissolved in water with sulfuric acid. In this way, he gave a micro method that avoids the use of a refractometer.

During the Austrian occupation of his county, in an improvised laboratory, he and his daughter developed a simpler method for determining the fat in milk, which excluded the use of a centrifuge. He also described methods for colorimetric determination of iron, determination of viscosity in mineral oils, determination of consumption of potassium permanganate in drinking water, and methods to test brandy.

He showed that the iodine number in fats and oils decreases with standing and thus criticized the iodine number.

=== Papers in the field of organic chemistry ===
Zega worked in this field as a student at the Cantonal University in Zurich. In the laboratory of V. Merc, he prepared his doctoral thesis which consisted of two partsː Über die Einwirkung des p-Toluidins auf Resorcin and Hydrochinon and Über die Einwirkung des Anilins auf Orcin. The work is of a synthetic nature, and on that occasion, Zega obtained several aromatic amine compounds from p-toluidine with resorcinol or toluidine, from which he later found various derivatives.

=== Food analyses ===
As a municipal chemist, Zega performed analyses of foodstuffs in Serbia that were unknown in Europe at the time. There was no standard for these foods, therefore, it was up to Zega to publish the results of his research and findings in German scientific journals. Significant works include studies of dairy products, most of which were not known in Central Europe, such as Serbian fasting cheese, Serbian cheese, manur, kajmak and cheese. Examinations of bread, corn, vegetables such as beans, eggplant, peas, bamnja, various mushrooms, etc. were also recorded.

=== Mineral water analyses ===
He analysed mineral water alone or in collaboration with Marko B. Nikolić. Twenty-two analyses were published in 1902. Some of the analyses include mineral waters in Mladenovac (1900), which he analyzed himself. Together with Marko B. Nikolić, he analyzed the waters in places such as Ribarska Banja (1899), Vrnjačka Banja (1900), Aleksandrovac (1904), Brđani (1904), Ivanjica (1904), Gornja Trepča Banja (1904), Buci (1905), Lukovo (1905), Žarevo (1905), Velika Vrbnica (1905), and Đaka (1905).

=== Other works ===
In addition to chemical analyses, Zega also performed bacteriological analyses and published two papers in this field: "On a chromogenic bacterium" and a paper on a constructed apparatus for taking water samples for later bacteriological analysis.

== Awards and decorations ==
He was awarded the ribbon "For Honor and Loyalty", the "Dušan the Mighty" silver monument, and "The Best Knight" gold medal. In 1921, at the celebration of the thirtieth anniversary of his work, he was awarded the Order of Saint Sava, 3rd degree by the Ministry of Education, Science and Technology Development.

== Bibliography ==
- Сарић, Милоје (1998). Живот и дело српских научника (PDF) (in Serbian). Vol. 3. Belgrade: САНУ. ISBN 86-7025-271-6. Archived from the original (PDF) on February 4, 2019.
