= Bolečica =

Bolečica (Болечица)
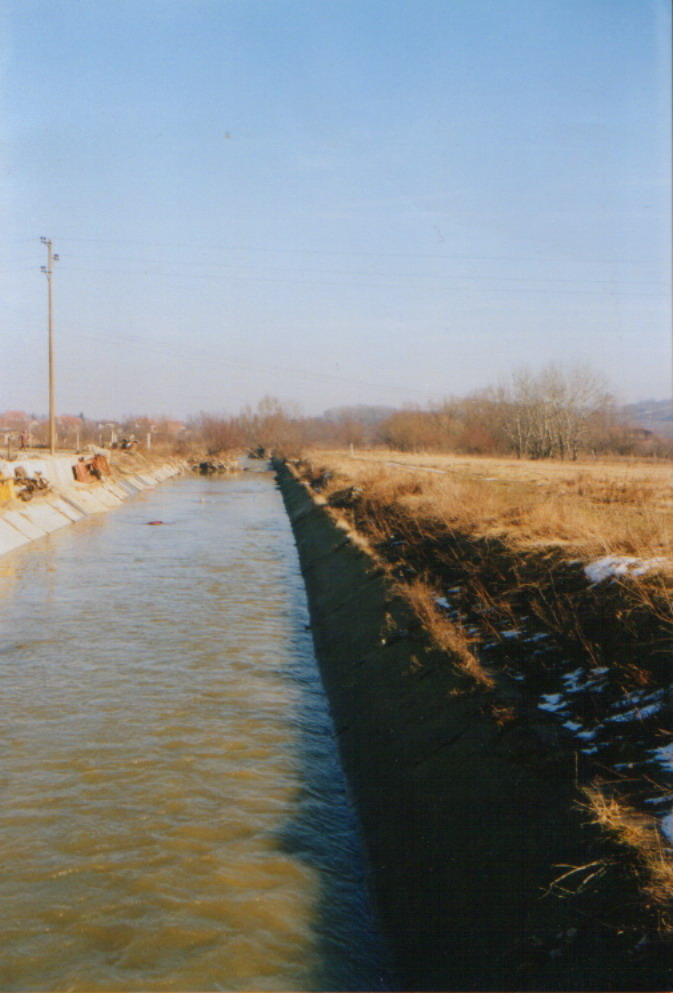
- Bolečica in the early 2000s, before the expansion of the Leštane industrial zone

Location
- Country: Serbia

Physical characteristics
- Source
  - location: south of Vrčin, Serbia
  - elevation: 105 m (344 ft)
- Mouth
  - location: Danube, at Vinča, Serbia
  - coordinates: 44.7579°N 20.6264°E
- Length: 12 km (7.5 mi)

Basin features
- Progression: Danube→ Black Sea

The Bolečica (Serbian Cyrillic: Болечица) is a short river in north-central Serbia, a 12 km-long right tributary to the Danube. During its entire flow it runs through the suburban section of Belgrade and despite being short it flows through the three Belgrade's municipalities, next to the half dozen of suburbs of Belgrade (giving its name to one of them) with a total population of 35,000 and is a route to important roads.

== Course ==
Bolečica originates in the northern, low Šumadija region, between two "Belgrade mountains", Avala and Kosmaj, on the slopes of the Begaljica Hill, at an altitude of 105 meters. Originally, it flows to the north along the eastern slopes of the Avala, crossing between the municipalities of Grocka and Voždovac, next to the villages of Vrčin and Zuce, where it receives the Vranovac creek from the right and enters the valley of Bubanj Potok where it marks the eastern border of the woods of Stepin Lug, turns to the north-east through the southernmost tip of the municipality of Zvezdara (for some 300 meters) and receives two more creeks from the left, Bubanj Potok and Zavojnička reka. Bolečica continues through the southern section of Leštane, where it receives the creek of Kaluđerički potok from the left and forms the border between the four suburbs area: Leštane, Boleč, Ritopek and Vinča (where it receives the creek of Makački potok from the left), where it empties into the Danube by a small estuary at an altitude of 68 meters, just east of Belo Brdo, the archeological find of the Vinča culture.

== Characteristics ==
The majority of the Bolečica's flow has been channeled, mostly in the Bubanj Potok-Leštane section. For that purpose, the river bed has been concreted and moved to the west, so the river is now further away from Boleč, which was named after the river. It enabled for a usually minor water flow to conduct abundantly larger quantities of water during heavy rains and floods. However, the final 3 kilometers of the river, through Vinča, has not been channeled, so with the growth of the Danube's level, the water overflows the estuary preventing the waters drained by Bolečica to flow into the Danube (inverse flow). As a result, during high levels, Bolečica overspills itself, sometimes causing the traffic breach on a major roads that cross over the river, like Kružni put and Smederevski put.

Due to the much larger impact the river has on Leštane than it has on Boleč, through which it basically doesn't flow, some of the geographers tend to call the river Leštanska reka (Cyrillic: Лештанска река, lit. 'Leštane river') but the name has not been accepted officially neither among the local population.

A short valley of Bolečica, which can be divided in two sections, Vrčin-Bubanj Potok and Bubanj Potok- Leštane-Vinča is a natural route for several important transportation lines:

- the Belgrade-Požarevac railway
- the Kružni put, major road in the southern outskirts of Belgrade which begins almost 30 kilometers to the west, at Ostružnica
- the section of Smederevski put, the major road which connects Belgrade and Smederevo
- the section of the Belgrade-Niš highway, at Bubanj Potok

Bolečica is bridged by the Kružni put in Leštane and by the Smederevski put, near the crossroad with Kružni put. Works on building additional 3 kilometers of the road from that point to the river's mouth into the Danube are halted in 2006. However, this section of the Bolečica's valley is projected route of the future modern highway which should begin at the Bubanj Potok highway crossroad and continue through the projected bridge Vinča-Omoljica into the province of Vojvodina. Despite frequent discussion by the city government on this subject, no projects have been accepted so far.

The name of the river means literally "(the water) that cures the illness" (Serbian: bol, ilneess, pain and lečiti, to heal, to cure). Today however, the river is highly polluted, becoming merely an open sewage canal. Dumping of the sewage begins already at Vrčin, and the sewages of all the adjoining settlements, even much larger and distant Kaluđerica. As of March 2007, the projected sewage collector is still not finished. In addition, Bolečica flows through two emerging industrial zones, those of Bubanj Potok and Leštane. The dumping of industrial waste contributed to the demise of the wildlife in the river, which until the late 1990s was clear brook with small fishes and frogs, but today is dead, murky and full of waste deposits and not suitable even for the industrial use anymore.

In March 2019, the environmentalists described the Bolečica as "less of a watercourse, more of a sewage watershed".
