= Janko Gagić =

- Born: Ribnica near Ribarska Banja, Ottoman Empire
- Died: 4 February 1804; Boleč, Ottoman Empire
- Cause of death: Assassination
- Known for: First Serbian Uprising; Slaughter of the Dukes
- Title: Buljubaša (Small military unit leader)

Janko Gagić (Serbian Cyrillic: Јанко Гагић; died 4 February 1804) was a Serbian hajduk leader (buljubaša). He was killed during the Slaughter of the Knezes, a campaign by the Janissaries who had revolted against the Ottoman Sultan Mahmud II. The killings sparked the Serbian Revolution, ultimately leading to Serbia's liberation from the Ottoman Empire.

Gagić was born in village of Ribnica in the Ribarska Banja region near Kruševac. After several Turks abducted his sister Teodora, Janko, a young and courageous man, with several comrades chased them down and killed them. As it was unsafe for him to remain in his home region, he moved to the village of Boleč between Belgrade and Grocka. He joined the Serbian Free Corps and participated in the Austro-Turkish War and Koča's frontier rebellion, where he gained military experience. Known for his bravery, he was chosen to be a knez (village chieftain) in Boleč during the Habsburg occupation of Serbia. After the war and return of Ottoman rule, the Janissaries began to empower themselves. In 1801, the Janissary leaders, known as Dahije, took over the Sanjak of Smederevo in defiance of the Sultan. Janko had by then become an influential freedom-fighter. Janko was unreluctant in attacking Dahije but controlled a road to Smederevo near Boleč along with his comrades. When the Dahije started to fear that the Sultan would make use of the Serbs to oust them, they decided to execute all notable Serbs to forestall this. As a notable hajduk commander, Janko was subject of fear among Turks, which is why he was targeted; the Turks abducted his son, forcing Janko to surrender. He was decapitated. His death was described in the Serbian epic folk poem Otac ("The Father").

Today, one of the major streets, and a public fountain in Boleč, are named after him. In February 2014, exactly 210 years after his assassination, his remains were moved into a Boleč churchyard tomb.
