= Radmilovac =

Radmilovac Радмиловац
- suburban settlement
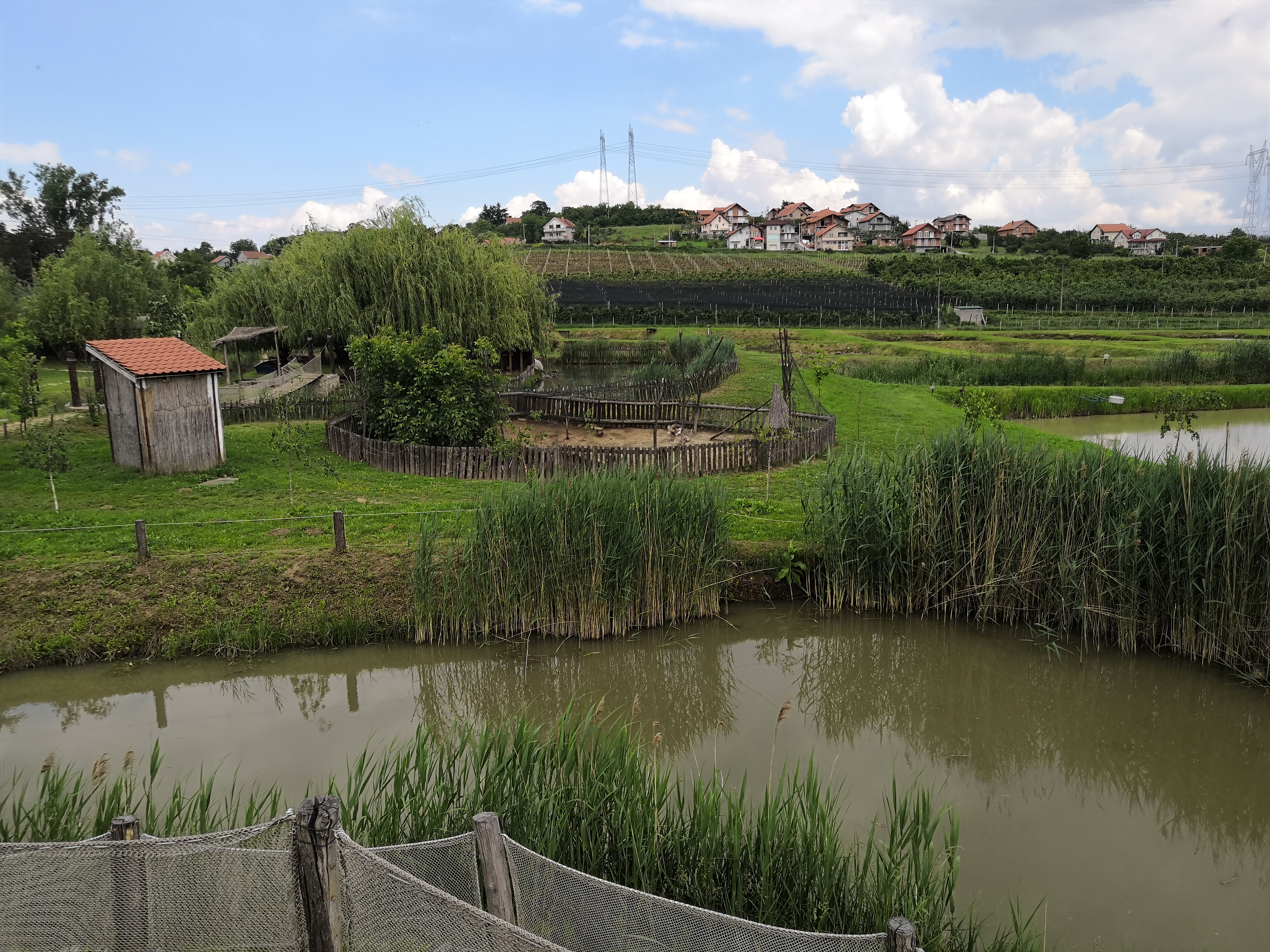
- Part of the experimental farm with the settlement behind it
- Interactive map of Radmilovac
- Coordinates: 44.753895°N 20.583604°E
- Country: Serbia

Population (2008)
  - Total: 500
- Time zone: UTC+1 (CET)
  - Summer (DST): UTC+2 (CEST)

Radmilovac (Serbian Cyrillic: Радмиловац) is a suburban settlement of Belgrade, the capital of Serbia, and an experimental farm of the University of Belgrade's Faculty of Agriculture. It is located in the Belgrade municipality of Grocka. It is also known for the hotel of the same name.

== Location ==
Radmilovac is actually a westernmost extension of the Belgrade's suburb of Vinča (to which it makes no urban connections), on the very border with the neighboring Leštane. It is located north of the road of Smederevski put which connects Belgrade and the town of Smederevo. It is located 14 kilometers north-east of downtown Belgrade, between Vinča and Kaluđerica with Leštane being located right across the Smederevski put. Right behind the settlement is the Vinča Nuclear Institute.

== Farm ==
=== History ===
The experimental agricultural farm of Radmilovac, a section of the Faculty of Agriculture in Belgrade is the original core of the neighborhood. Farm originated from the lands bequested to the Faculty by the industrialist, deputy and judge Milan Vukićević in 1941, when he died. Vukićević left the farm estate for the practical education in all types of agriculture. He originally purchased 39 ha (96 acres) from the municipalities of Vinča and Kaluđerica. The estate already had several buildings. In one section of the administrative building there is a museum "Radmilovac", dedicated to Vukićević.

Milan's wife Radmila Vukićević was the first manager of the farm from 1941 to 1945 when she died, too. In 1947 the farm was named Radmilovac in her honor (Serbian for “Radmila’s place”). It was also in 1947 when the faculty took over the farm, due to the World War II and post-war developments in the state. After World War II the land was nationalized, returned to the Faculty in the 1960s, taken by the state again and given to the PKB company, main agricultural supplier of the Belgrade market. In the late 1980s the farm was finally returned to the Faculty again. The reconstruction and expansion of the farm began in 2006, with new small fishponds and projected halls and covered areas.

=== Characteristics ===
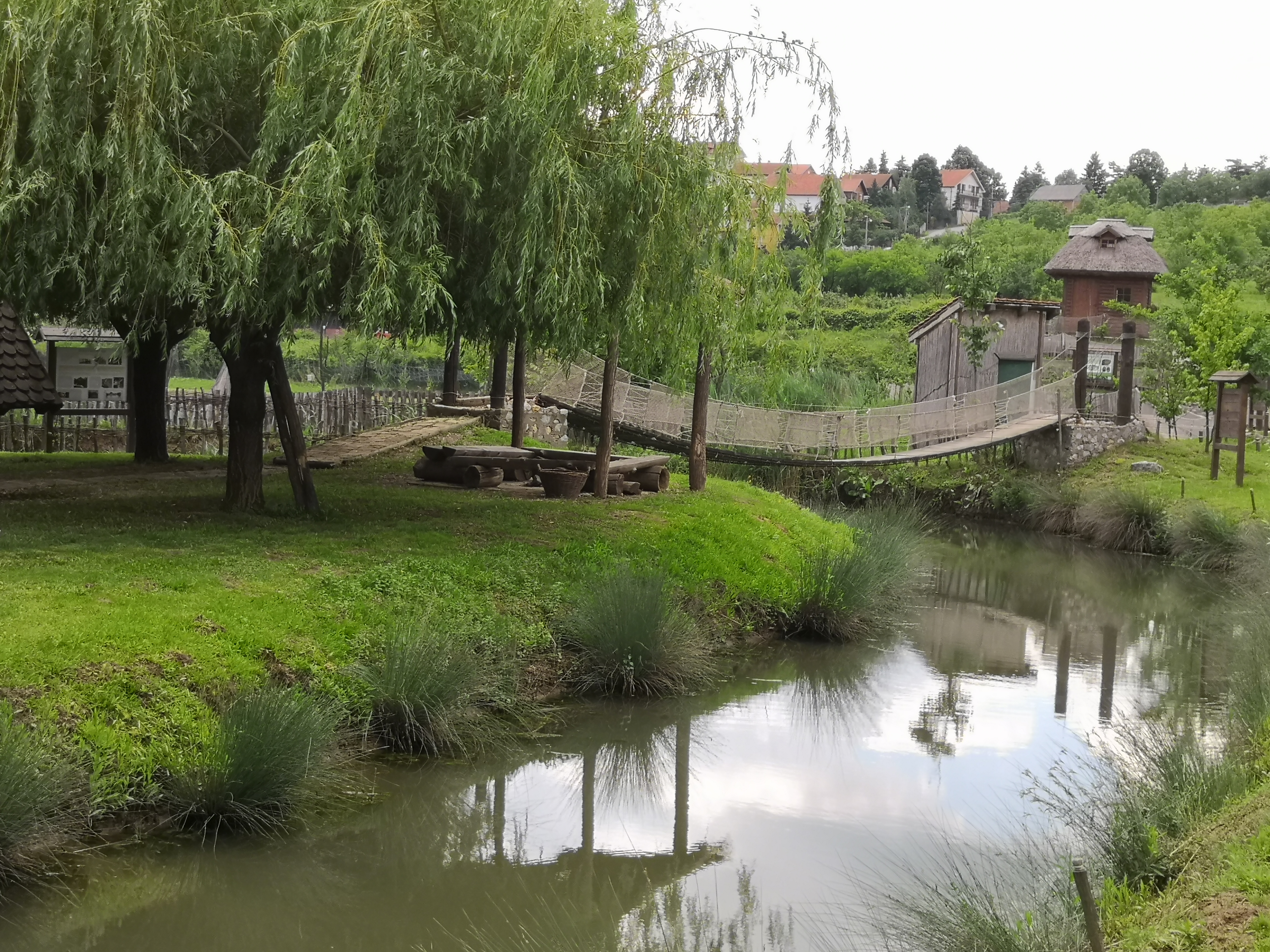
Section of the Little Danube complex

Today the farm, mainly known for its orchards, covers an area of 86 hectares. It is the largest agricultural gene bank in eastern and southeastern Europe.

==== Agriculture ====
Arable land covers 10 hectares and includes several large greenhouses. Products of Radmilovac can be bought on the farm. They include wines, brandies, seedlings, but also some unusual products like a tomato jam.

==== Beer ====
A ceramic container with small hole-like marks on the inside, was discovered in a Neolithic house at the nearby Vinča archaeological site. Discovered in the late 2010s, it was dated to 5,000 BC, and the marks were consistent with the ones made by the alcoholic fermentation. Inside the same house, abundant quantity of grains was discovered, too. Archaeologists from the site, and archaeobotanists from the University of Massachusetts Boston, conducted an experiment in Radmilovac. They planted ancient varieties of wheat and barley, and then used the grains to produce mildly alcoholic "Neolithic beer", resembling boza.

==== Fruits ====
Orchards cover 15 hectares and are populated by apples, plums, peaches and pears, including one peach cultivar created here. Trees are planted differently from the usual way, with lesser space between them, only one meter apart (up to 3.000 seedlings per hectare). Anti-hail net is placed between the trees and a drip irrigation system is introduced. One section is reserved for the old local and new worldwide cultivars, including hundreds of unique fruit brands. Internationally known type of brandies are being produced here.

==== Vineyards ====
Vineyards spread over 13 hectares. Farm developed 23 new grape cultivars, 15 table and 8 wine varieties. Yield varies from 35 to 60 tons per year, with 20 tons internationally recognized brands of wines made of it.

A house and the adjoining grapevine in 4 Gospodska street in a distant neighborhood of Zemun are protected by the law. The vine was planted c1910. It is of the red grape variety, specifically the Rosette (Seibel 1000), or, as it is called in Serbia, the "Frenchman". Popularly nicknamed "Zemunka" ("Zemun girl"), the vine is still vital, spreading and bearing fruit. Faculty of Agriculture examined its grapes. The French hybrid originated from after 1860. The French cultivars were grafted on the American cultivars after the massive Phylloxera epidemic caused the Great French Wine Blight, which actually destroyed vineyards in entire Europe. The "Seibel 1000" cultivar reached Serbia in 1903. Some 30 vines were transplanted in Radmilovac. Grapes from there are being mixed with that from Zemun and experimental wines have been produced. The grafts of the "Zemunka" have been transplanted to several other vineyards in Serbia, including the ones at Oplenac.

==== Beekeeping ====
The farm also contains bees gene bank and 40 beehives. They produce several different types of honey: black locust, floral, sunflower, multifloral (“meadow”). Curiosity is honey produced from sophora (“Japanese acacia”).

==== Fishpond ====
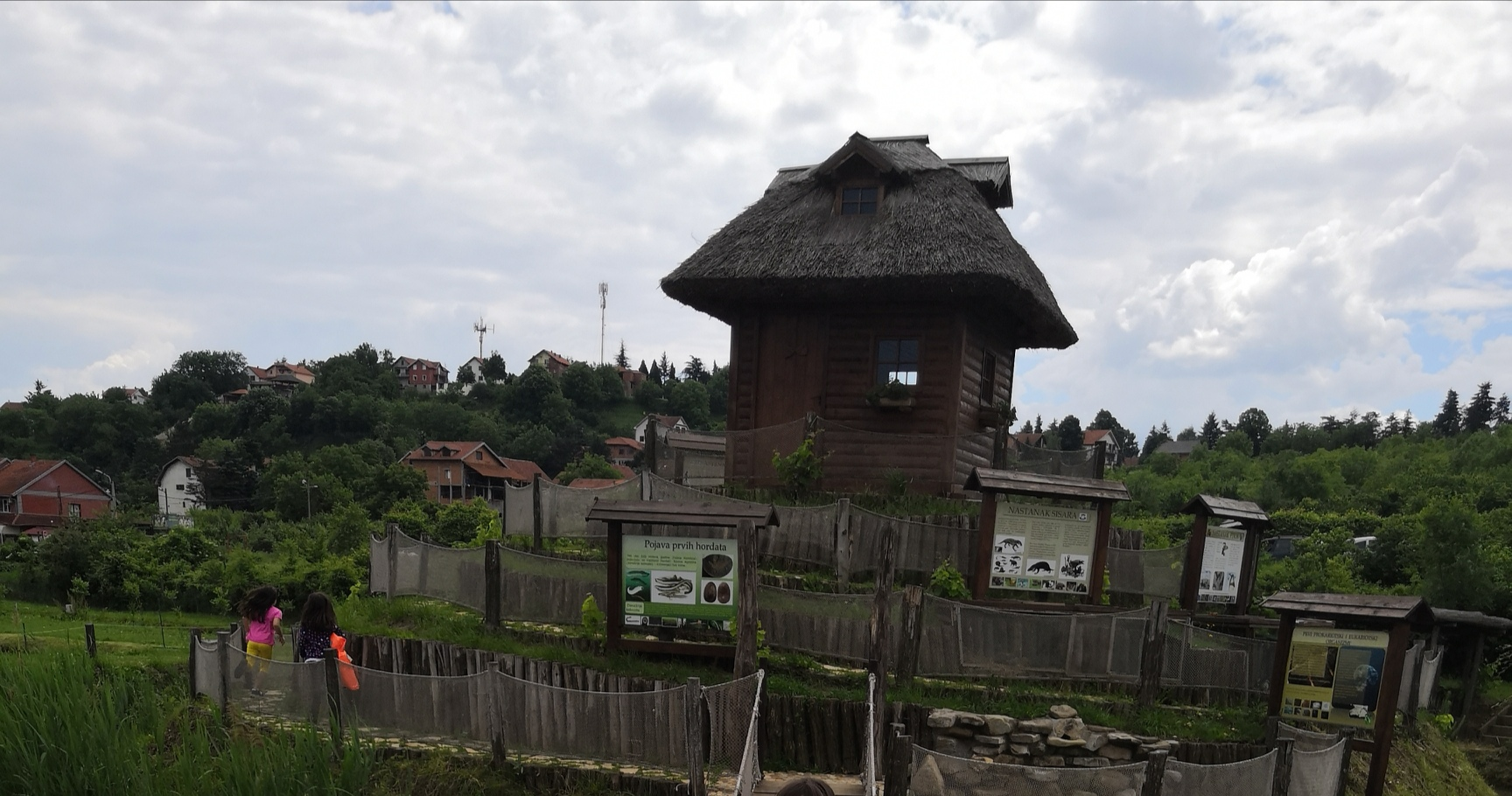
Replica of the old-style fishermen's house

Center for fishery and applied hydrobiology occupies 5 hectares. Formerly, a stream Ševarice flowed through the farm. It received wastewater from the neighboring settlements and was so polluted that it was named Šugavac (Scabies stream). It was conducted underground into the sewage system and instead an artificial short clean stream, named "Little Danube". The water wells were dug and the wetland around the stream was recreated. It is 1.5 kilometers long and is a miniature representation of the entire Danube's flow, from the Black Forest to the Black Sea, including islands, peninsulas, hills, mountains and plains. Little Danube is populated with 40 fish species and plants were planted along its banks, both fishes and plants being characteristic for the "Big" Danube, which flows on the other side of the hill behind the farm.

A series of fish ponds were created. Main species include common carp and trout. Inside the Center, there are 40 aquariums with numerous types of fish: common barbel, huchen, brook trout, common minnow, eel, goldfish, European mudminnow, common roach, common bream, Wels catfish, zander and Northern pike, but also the genetically mixed fish population. The aquariums are ornamented with the replicas of the Lepenski Vir sculptures. The fishing of carp and catfish is allowed. One section is turned into the botanical water garden with 40 species of aquatic plants, and 30 species of birds (15 species of ducks, 5 species of geese, ruddy shelducks, swans, black swans and peacocks) roaming between the ponds. In one pond a small artificial island ("miniature Great War Island") is constructed and a fisherman's house built on it that can be reached by walking over the short hanging bridge. In the house, the old tools used by the fishermen are exhibited, so as the model of tikvara, old type of the fishing boat.

On 21 September 2019, within the "Little Danube" complex, a replica of the prehistoric fishermen settlement was opened. It consists of 5 segments: Paleolithic (cave, to 10,000 BC); Mesolithic (first permanent settlements, 10,000-6,000 BC); Neolithic 1 (Starčevo culture dugouts, 6,200-5,300 BC); Neolithic 2 (Vinča culture houses, 5,300-4,300 BC); fishermen houses from 4,300 BC till today. The project was designed by the group of archaeologists, fishery professors, architects and craftsmen.

== Hotel ==
Hotel "Radmilovac" was opened on 9 October 1989. As a major venue of its kind in the area between Belgrade and Smederevo, it soon developed into the popular place, especially because of its restaurant. Though not a large venue, in time it was often visited by Dobrica Ćosić, Momo Kapor, Vladimir Cvetković, Dragan Kićanović, Dragan Džajić, Nemanja Vidić, Zdravko Čolić, but also hosted Armand Assante, Bernie Ecclestone, and others. Because of the legal problems with defection of the Romanian-Serbian footballer Miodrag Belodedici to Belgrade and the Red Star Belgrade, the team organized his stay in "Radmilovac", due to the hotel's location outside of the city. Also, on its way to winning the Intercontinental Cup in 1991, team members of Red Star Belgrade stayed in the hotel between the matches. After returning to Serbia, Prince Tomislav of Yugoslavia lived for a while in "Radmilovac". In total, five princes from the former royal family spent some time in the hotel, including Prince Vladimir Karađorđević.

Numerous symposiums, either political, sport or professional, were organized in the hotel. For a while, it was fashionable to organize weddings in the "Radmilovac", including ones organized by the Serbian prime minister Dragutin Zelenović for his daughter, and the wedding of Claudio Del Monaco and Dragana Jugović del Monaco. For years, the venue hosted an artistic colony and as a result it exhibits 120 works of Raša Trkulja, Danica Basta, Moma Antonović, Vasa Dolovački, Dragan Stojkov (painter), and others.

== Settlement ==
Radmilovac is a small, exclusively residential settlement of few dozen houses located around the hotel. It developed on the hill above the farm, beginning in the late 1970s, and today has an estimated population of 500.
