= Zuce =

Coordinates: 44°41′58″N 20°33′20″E

Zuce Зуце
- suburban settlement
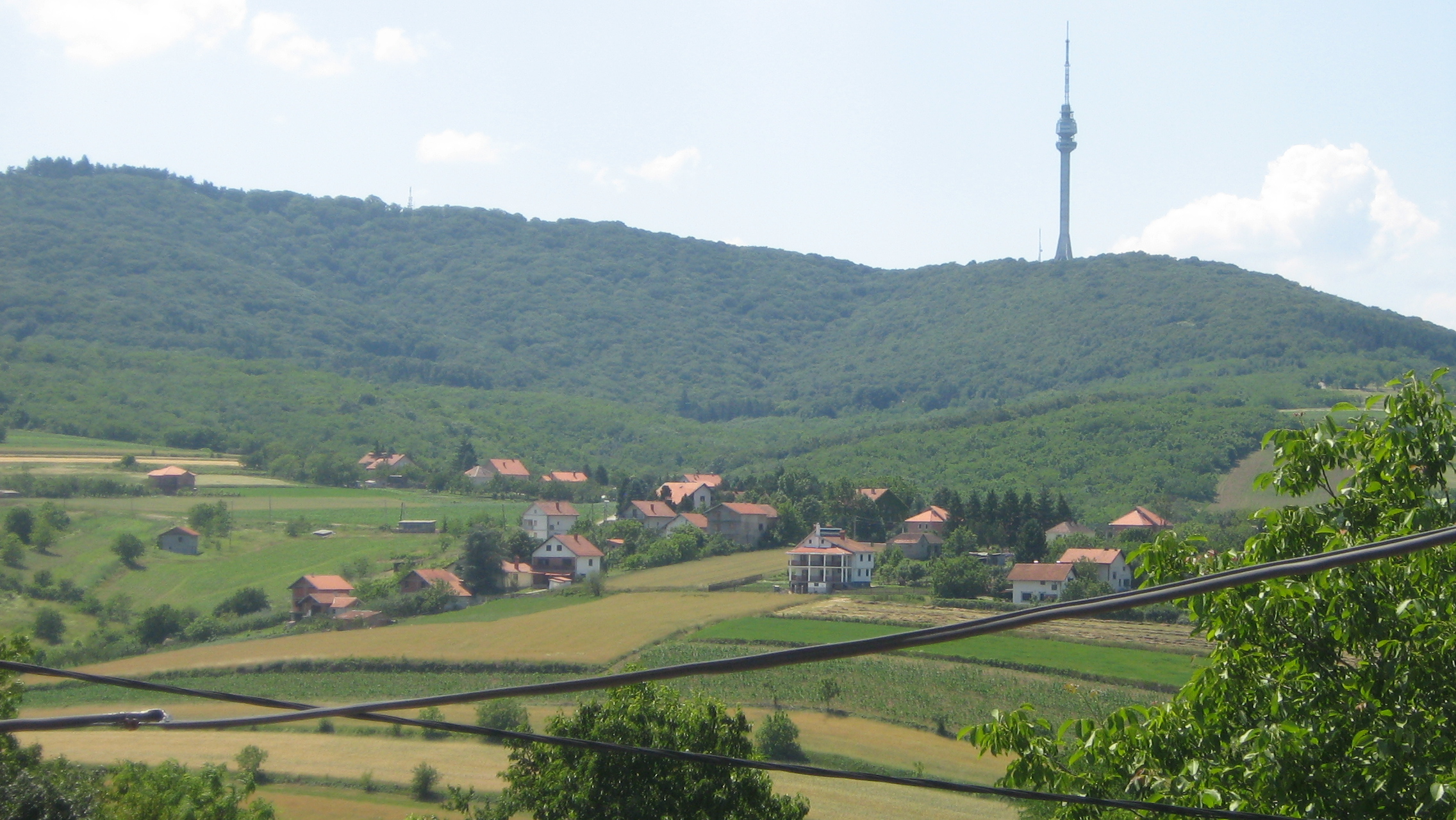
- View on Avala from Zuce
- Interactive map of Zuce
- Country: Serbia
- City: Belgrade

Area
  - Total: 11.95 km^{2} (4.61 sq mi)

Population (2011)
  - Total: 2,001
  - Density: 167.4/km^{2} (433.7/sq mi)
- Time zone: UTC+1 (CET)
  - Summer (DST): UTC+2 (CEST)

Historical population
Year	Pop.	±%
1948	1,279	—
1953	1,380	+7.9%
1961	1,517	+9.9%
1971	1,526	+0.6%
1981	1,771	+16.1%
1991	1,967	+11.1%
2002	2,024	+2.9%
2011	2,001	−1.1%

Zuce (Serbian Cyrillic: Зуце) is a suburban settlement of Belgrade, Serbia. It is located in Belgrade's municipality of Voždovac.

== Location and geography ==
Zuce is the easternmost settlement in the municipality, located in the low Šumadija region, on the eastern slopes of the Avala mountain in the valley of the Vranovac creek, a tributary to the Bolečica river. Zuce is located south-east of downtown Belgrade, next to both the railway and highway Belgrade-Niš. It generally spreads to the north (in the direction of the neighborhood of Bubanj Potok) and to the south (in the direction of Vrčin).

The area is known for several water springs, including the "Točak" (wheel) spring. In June 2008, a geothermal water spring (22 Celsius) was found in the alluvial valley of the Zavojnička river, on the depth of 150 meters. Water is currently being tested by the Geology Institute of Serbia, which initially reported that the water, though not hot, might be used for heating via heating pumps which would warm it up.

== Population ==
Zuce is statistically classified as a rural settlement (village). According to the official census of population it had 2,001 inhabitants in 2011. In 2002, Serbs made 96.89% and Goranci 0.84% of the population.

== Economy ==
Zuce is an agricultural settlement. Major products are corn, wheat and, until 2010s, a quality cabbage. Many of the cabbage fields were sold in 2008 due to the construction of the Belgrade bypass. The village is also known for its young brined cheese ("mladi zučki sir"), from which the cream can not be skimmed.

The 1st Air Defense Missile Battalion, one of the "Neva" battalions of the 250th Air Defense Missile Brigade, is located in the village.
