= Rodoljub Džamić =

Serbian politician (born 1951)

Rodoljub Džamić (Serbian Cyrillic: Родољуб Џамић; born 31 May 1951) is a Serbian politician. He was a member of the National Assembly of Serbia for two terms between 1991 and 1997 and has served as the mayor of Vrnjačka Banja on three occasions. For most of his political career, Džamić has been a member of the Socialist Party of Serbia (Socijalistička partija Srbije, SPS).

== Early life and private career ==
Džamić was born in the village of Velika Vrbnica in the municipality of Aleksandrovac, in what was then the People's Republic of Serbia in the Federal People's Republic of Yugoslavia. He attended secondary school in nearby Trstenik, graduated from the University of Niš Faculty of Law, and later passed the bar exam in Belgrade. He worked with PPT Trstenik from 1969 to 1971 and with the republic and Kraljevo SUP from 1972 to 1981.

He was president of the IS of the municipal assembly of Vrnjačka Banja from 1982 to 1986, and from 1987 to 1999 he was director of the JP Bell Izvor.

== Politician ==
=== In socialist Yugoslavia ===
Džamić became politically active when Serbia was still a one-party socialist state. He was elected to the Vrnjačka Banja municipal assembly in the 1989 municipal elections and was afterward chosen as its president, a position that was at the time equivalent to mayor. He served in this role for the next two years. In 1990, he presided over a major event in which the television program Jeux sans frontières held competitions in the municipality.

=== Socialist Party of Serbia ===
Serbia became a multi-party democracy in 1990, and Džamić joined the SPS on its formation. He was elected to the national assembly for the Vrnjačka Banja division in the 1990 Serbian parliamentary election and took his seat when the new parliament convened in 1991. The SPS won a majority government in the election, and Džamić served as a supporter of the administration.

Serbia introduced a system of proportional representation for parliamentary elections in 1992. Džamić received the eighteenth position on the SPS's list in the Kragujevac division and was not chosen for a mandate when the list won eleven seats. (From 1992 to 2000, Serbia's electoral law stipulated that one-third of parliamentary mandates would be assigned to candidates on successful lists in numerical order, while the remaining two-thirds would be distributed amongst other candidates at the discretion of the sponsoring parties or coalitions. Džamić's could have been awarded a mandate despite his low position on the list, but he was not.)

He was promoted to the tenth position on Socialist Party's list for Kragujevac in the 1993 Serbian parliamentary election and was this time awarded a mandate when the list won twelve seats. The SPS formed a coalition government with New Democracy (Nova demokratija, ND) after the election, and Džamić again served as a government supporter. He was a member of the assembly committee for trade and tourism and the committee for environmental protection.

Džamić was re-elected to the Vrnjačka Banja assembly in the 1996 Serbian local elections; the SPS won a narrow majority in the municipality, and he was chosen afterward for another term as mayor. He later appeared in the eighth position (out of eight) on the SPS's list for the smaller, redistributed Kraljevo division in the 1997 Serbian parliamentary election and was not chosen for a new national assembly mandate when the list won two seats.

Džamić was the mayor of Vrnjačka Banja during the Kosovo War and the NATO bombing of Yugoslavia in early 1999; during this time, the municipality lost much of its regular tourist revenue and became a refugee centre for people fleeing bombardment in other communities. Later in the year, the opposition Alliance for Change group led a series of protests throughout Serbia against Slobodan Milošević's regime and the continued rule of the SPS. In some areas, the state apparatus responded with violence. Džamić did not take this approach in Vrnjačka Banja; it was noted that he voluntarily agreed to "sit in the dock" and respond to citizens' questions. In early 2000, Džamić was temporarily placed on an international sanctions list and forbidden from travelling to European Union countries.

Milošević was defeated by Democratic Opposition of Serbia (Demokratska opozicija Srbije, DOS) candidate Vojislav Koštunica in the 2000 Yugoslavian presidential election, a watershed moment in Serbian and Yugoslavian politics. The DOS also defeated the SPS in Vrnjačka Banja in the concurrent 2000 Serbian local elections, and Džamić's second tenure as mayor came to an end. He was personally re-elected to the local assembly and led the SPS group in opposition.

Serbia's government fell after Milošević's defeat in the Yugoslavian election, and a a new Serbian parliamentary election was held in December 2000. Serbia's electoral system was reformed prior to the vote, such that the entire country became a single electoral division and all mandates were awarded to candidates on successful lists at the discretion of the sponsoring parties or coalitions, irrespective of numerical order. Džamić appeared in the 250th position (out of 250) on the SPS's list, which was largely alphabetical. The list won thirty-seven seats, and he was not chosen for a new mandate.

=== Out of the SPS ===
Džamić left the SPS in either 2003 or 2004 and formed a new local political party called Znamo kako ("We Know How").

For the 2004 local elections, Serbia introduced the direct election of mayors, separated the offices of mayor and assembly president, and introduced a system of proportional representation for municipal assemblies. Džamić was elected to a third term as mayor in Vrnjačka Banja; his party also won a narrow victory in the local assembly election, and he formed a coalition government afterward with several other parties. The direct election of mayors proved to be a short-lived experiment and was withdrawn in the next local electoral cycle four years later.

In 2006, Džamić oversaw the return of a statue of Alexander I of Yugoslavia to Vrnjačka Park in the municipality. The statue had first been consecrated in 1936 and was removed by Yugoslavian authorities after World War II.

Džamić brought his local party into an alliance with New Serbia (Nova Srbija, NS) in late 2006 and appeared in the 206th position on a coalition electoral list led by New Serbia and the Democratic Party of Serbia (Demokratska stranka Srbije, DSS) in the 2007 Serbian parliamentary election. The list won forty-seven seats, and he was not given a new parliamentary mandate.

He again appeared on a combined DSS–NS list in the 2008 Serbian parliamentary election and was not given a mandate when the list fell to thirty seats. He also led New Serbia's list for Vrnjačka Banja in the concurrent 2008 local elections and took a mandate after the list finished in third place with five seats.

Vrnjačka Banja was unable to form a new municipal government within the designated time after the 2008 election, and the Serbian government dissolved the local assembly in August 2008 and called new elections for November. Džamić was appointed to a provisional authority that governed the municipality pending the repeat vote. New Serbia fell to three seats in the November election. Džamić once again led the party's list, took a mandate in the assembly, and served for the term that followed.

=== Return to the Socialist Party ===
Džamić rejoined the Socialist Party at some point between 2008 and 2012.

Serbia's electoral system was again reformed in 2011, such that all mandates were awarded to candidates on successful lists in numerical order. Džamić appeared in the ninetieth position on the SPS's list for the 2012 parliamentary election and was not elected when the list won forty-four seats. He led the SPS's list in Vrnjačka Banja in the concurrent 2012 local elections and was re-elected when the list won four seats, finishing third against a coalition list led by the Serbian Progressive Party (Srpska napredna stranka, SNS).

He was chosen for a new term as municipal assembly president under unusual circumstances in July 2012. The SNS formed a coalition government that held sixteen out of thirty-one seats in the local assembly after the 2012 election, and the SPS was initially in opposition. In a secret ballot held among delegates to elect a new assembly president, Džamić was supported by the SPS, the Democratic Party (Demokratska stranka, DS), and the "Banja Is the Law" citizens' group, which collectively held the other fifteen seats. One member of the SNS-led coalition also broke ranks to support his candidacy, giving him an unexpected victory. He stood down in August 2012 to, as he put it, contribute to overcoming the misunderstandings that had arisen. The SPS was included afterward in a new coalition government led by the SNS. Under the new governing arrangement, Džamić was again chosen as assembly president in September 2012 and remained in this role for the remainder of the term.

Džamić again led the SPS list in Vrnjačka Banja for the 2016 local elections and was re-elected when the list won two seats. He stood down as assembly president after the election and served as a delegate for the term that followed.

He received the 141st position on the SPS's electoral list in the 2020 Serbian parliamentary election. Election from this position was not a realistic prospect, and he was not elected when the list won thirty-two seats. He also appeared in the second position on a combined SPS–United Serbia (Jedinstvena Srbija, JS) list in Vrnjačka Banja in the 2020 local elections, following local JS leader Vojislav Vujić, and was re-elected when the list won six seats. He remains a member of the assembly as of 2022.

== Electoral record ==
=== Local (Vrnjačka Banja) ===
2004 Municipality of Vrnjačka Banja local election: Mayor of Vrnjačka Banja
Candidate	Party	Votes	%
Rodoljub Džamić	Citizens' Group: We Know How	6,935	61.82
Mateja Mijatović (incumbent)	Democratic Party	4,283	38.18
Radoslav Erdoglić	Serbian Radical Party		
Total		11,218	100.00

=== National Assembly of Serbia ===
1990 Serbian parliamentary election: Vrnjačka Banja
Candidate	Party
Vladimir Dimitrijević	Citizens' Group
Dušan Dunjić	Citizens' Group
Radojica Đurđević	Serbian Renewal Movement
Milorad Župac	People's Radical Party
Slobodan Jeftić	Citizens' Group
Nikola Marjanović	Citizens' Group
Zoran Paunović	Citizens' Group
Ljubodrag Popčić	Citizens' Group
Boško Stanojčić	Citizens' Group
Bratislav Čeperković	Citizens' Group
Rodoljub Džamić (***WINNER***)	Socialist Party of Serbia
Total
