= Boleč =

Boleč Болеч
- Suburban settlement
- Location within Belgrade
- Coordinates: 44°43′N 20°36′E
- Country: Serbia
- Region: Belgrade
- Municipality: Grocka

Area
  - Total: 12.43 km^{2} (4.80 sq mi)
- Time zone: UTC+1 (CET)
  - Summer (DST): UTC+2 (CEST)
- Area code: +381(0)11
- Car plates: BG

Boleč (Serbian Cyrillic: Болеч) is a suburban settlement of Belgrade, Serbia. It is located in the municipality of Grocka.

== Location ==
Boleč is located 17 km east of the Belgrade, near the road of Smederevski put which connects Belgrade and Smederevo. One of the branches of the Bolečica river flows through the settlement and gives its name to it (its derived from Serbian words for bol (pain) and leči(ti) (to cure), so it means the water that heals the pain).

== History ==
Well preserved bust of the Roman emperor Macrinus (ruled 217-218) was found in Boleč. The locality was situated halfway between the ancient Singidunum, predecessor of modern Belgrade, and the modern village of Brestovik, which was also settled by the Romans. It was also close to the Tricornium fort, in modern Ritopek.

== Population ==
For decades the population of Boleč was growing. Since the mid-1970s however, the settlement (classified as the rural one, the village) is experiencing accelerated growth which continues until today, with large number of refugees from Bosnia, Croatia and Kosovo settling in this area. Originally south of the Smederevski put, as the settlement was growing it reached the road and connected to other surrounding villages (Ritopek, Vinča, Leštane), so today it makes one built-up area all the way to Belgrade. Population of Boleč:

- 1921 - 890
- 1953 - 1,213
- 1971 - 1,476
- 1981 - 3,360
- 1991 - 4,659
- 2002 - 5,750

== Notable people ==
- Janko Gagić, notable Serbian soldier and folk leader assassinated during the Slaughter of the Dukes
- Igor Krmar, professional football player
- Đorđe Crnomarković, professional football player

== Economy ==
Until the late 1970s and early 1980s the economy of Boleč was based on agriculture, especially on fruit growing as the one of major Serbian fruit regions begins here and stretches to Smederevo, 35 km to the east. Since then, a boom in privately owned small companies boosted the economy and attracted new population to migrate in the settlement. The only large company is the branch of PKB, agricultural company, with fruit plantations and huge refrigerators (PKB - Voćarske plantaže).

== Sports and culture ==
Boleč is the home for the FK Boleč football club that competes in lower ranks of Belgrade football.

The locally well known folk dance ensemble "KUD Boleč" (Cultural-artistic society Boleč) (Serbian: Kulturno-umetničko društvo Boleč) comes from this settlement.

== Sources ==
- Jovan Đ. Marković (1990): Enciklopedijski geografski leksikon Jugoslavije; Svjetlost-Sarajevo; ISBN 86-01-02651-6
