= Vrčin =

Vrčin Врчин
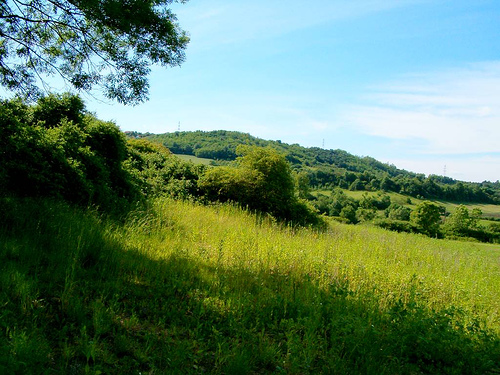
- Only 20 km from the capital center, Vrčin is a peaceful village with a stunning countryside
- Interactive map of Vrčin
- Coordinates: 44°40′N 20°36′E
- Country: Serbia
- Subdivision: Belgrade
- Municipality: Grocka

Population (2022)
  - Total: 8,601
- Postal code: 11224
- Area code: +381(0)11

Vrčin (Serbian Cyrillic: Врчин) is a suburban settlement of Belgrade, Serbia. It is located in Belgrade's municipality of Grocka.

== Name ==
Historians Dušan J. Popović and Vladimir Ćorović traced the name of the locality back to the Roman period and the nearby temple of Norcinium. It was dedicated to the Etruscan-Roman goddess of destiny, Nortia. After Slavic settlement, Roman names ending with -cin[ium] were mostly contracted to čin, while the suffix -dunum became din. Norcinium was thus shortened to Norčin and then modified to Vrčin.

== Politics ==
Vrčin was once the seat of its own municipality, which was disbanded and incorporated into the municipality of Grocka.

== Population ==
Vrčin is statistically classified as a rural settlement (village) and officially is the second most populous settlement in the municipality (Census 2002; after Kaluđerica but ahead of the municipal seat of Grocka). However, unofficial estimates that include refugees (not counted in the official census reports) also put Leštane before Vrčin.

Vrčin extends on both sides of the highway (originally developed from the western side). The eastern extension is colloquially known as Tranšped (Cyrillic: Траншпед). This area forms a continuous build-up area with Zaklopača. Vrčin has experienced a steady growth of population:

- 1921 – 3,470
- 1948 – 5,040
- 1953 – 5,342
- 1961 – 6,042
- 1971 – 6,263
- 1981 – 7,327
- 1991 – 7,589 (de facto)
- 1991 – 8,034 (de jure)
- 2002 – 8,667 (de facto)
- 2002 – 9,328 (de jure)
- 2011 – 9,088
- 2022 – 8,601
