= Vinča-Belo Brdo =

Archaeological site near Belgrade, Serbia

- Винча-Бело брдо (Serbian)
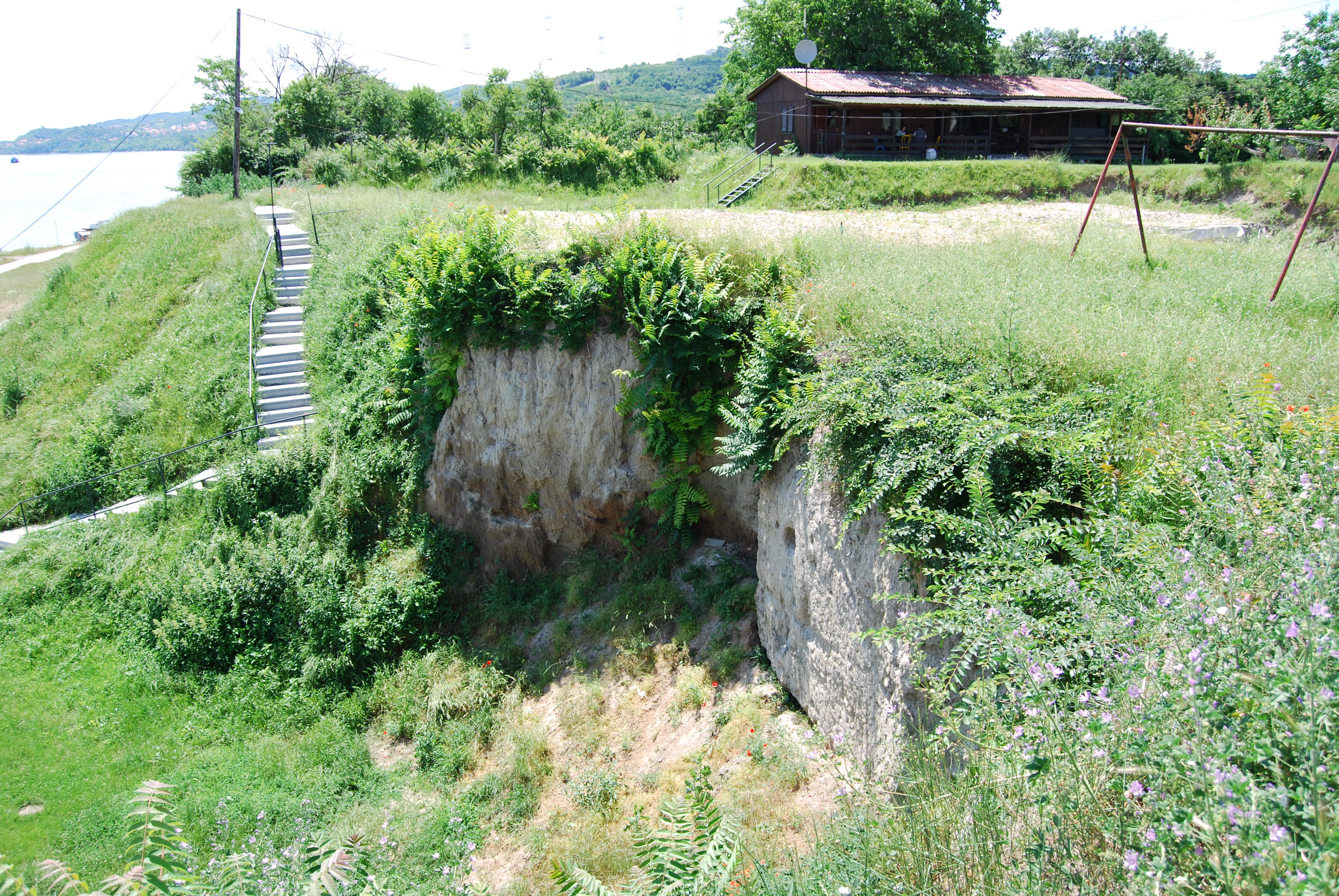
- Vinča-Belo Brdo tell site

- Location within Belgrade
- 44°45′43″N 20°37′23″E
- Type: Settlement
- Periods: Neolithic, Copper Age, Bronze Age, Iron Age, Medieval
- Cultures: Starčevo, Vinča, Bodrogkeresztúr, Baden, Kostolac, Vatin, Celtic
- Location: Vinča, Serbia

History
- Built: Approximately 5700 BCE

Site notes
- Area: 10 ha (25 acres)
- Archaeologists: Miloje Vasić, Nikola Tasić, Gordana Vujović, Dragoslav Srejović

Cultural Heritage of Serbia
- Type: Archaeological Site of Exceptional Importance
- Designated: 1950/1965
- Reference no.: АН 5

Vinča-Belo Brdo (Serbian: Винча-Бело брдо) is an archaeological site in Vinča, a near Belgrade, Serbia. The tell of Belo Brdo ('White Hill') is almost entirely made up of the remains of human settlement, and was occupied several times from the Early Neolithic (c. 5700 BCE) through to the Middle Ages. The most substantial archaeological deposits are from the Neolithic-Chalcolithic Vinča culture, of which Vinča-Belo Brdo is the type site.

== Geography ==
Vinča is situated on the right bank of the Danube, 14 km downstream from Belgrade, on a high loess terrace. This location was attractive to its Neolithic settlers: the Danube on one side provided water and fishing while on the other the valley of the river Bolečica connected it to a hinterland rich in minerals, ores, hunting grounds and fertile agricultural soils. Belo Brdo is one of the largest tell sites in the Balkans, covering 10 hectares of land with 9 metres of cultural deposits and a total height of 10.5 metres.

== Excavations ==
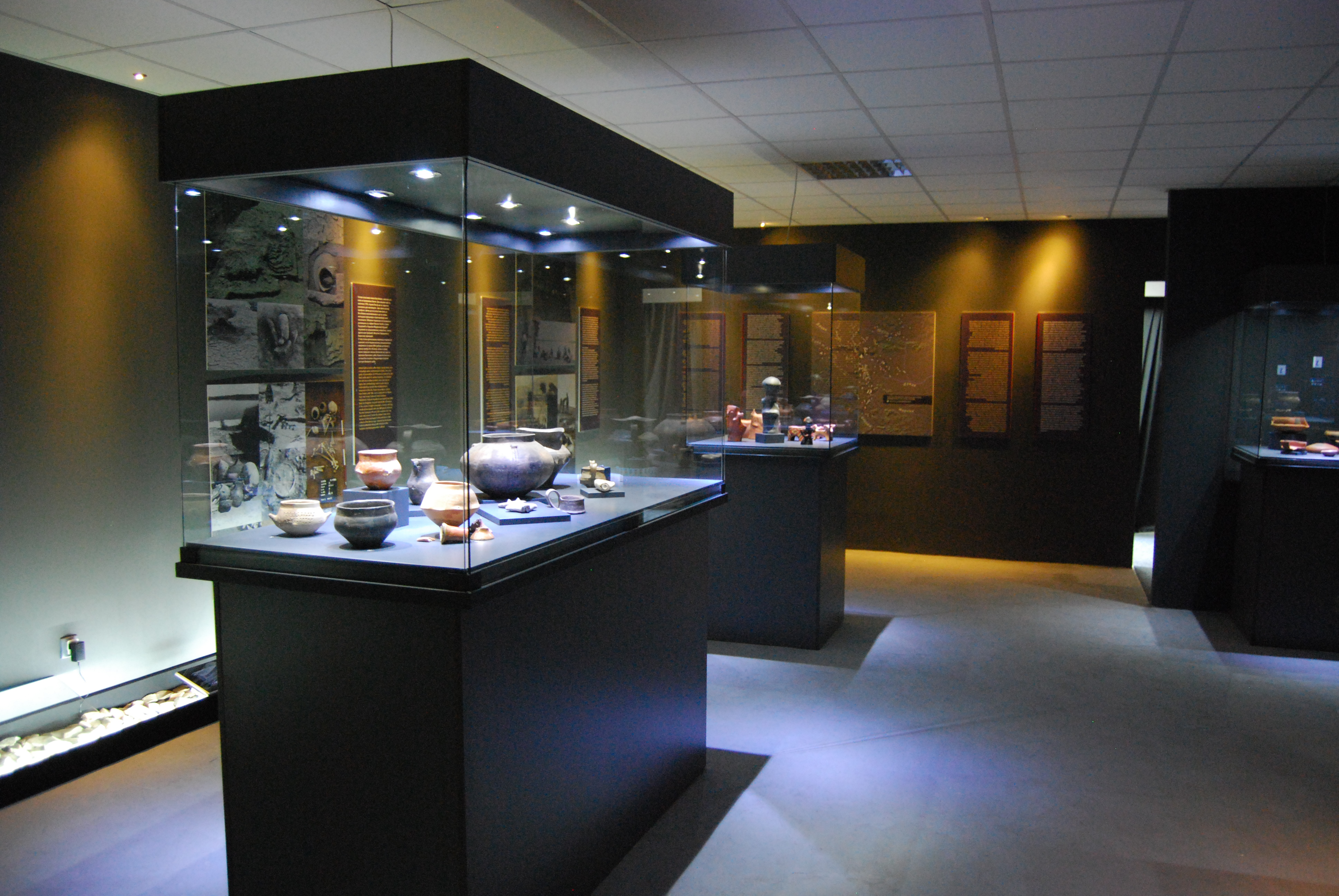
Museum display at Vinča-Belo Brdo.

The first archaeological excavations at Vinča were carried out by prominent Serbian archaeologist Miloje Vasić starting in 1908. This rescue excavation was prompted by the settlement being eroded by the Danube river. Some finds from the site had been taken to the National Museum a few years earlier. The excavations were interrupted by the outbreak of World War I and, apart from a brief season in 1924, Vasić was unable to obtain the necessary funding to continue working on the site from the impoverished postwar Yugoslav government. However, with the financial backing of British businessman and archaeologist Sir Charles Hyde, Vasić was able to resume excavations, on a much larger scale, between 1929 and 1931. These piqued the interest of the British press and the site was subsequently visited by several prominent intellectuals of the time, including Hyde, John Myres, Veselin Čajkanović, Walter Abel Heurtley and Bogdan Popović. Finds from these excavations are now in several UK museums including the Ashmolean Museum and the British Museum.

Following campaigns at the site of Vinča started in 1978 under the auspices of the Serbian Academy of Sciences and Arts. From 1978 to 1982 the project focused on the Bronze Age and later layers, under the direction of Nikola Tasić and Gordana Vujović. Between 1982 and 1986 excavations, led by Dragoslav Srejović were carried out on the more prominent Neolithic occupation.

Since 1998 an interdisciplinary team of experts led by Nenad Tasić, of the Belgrade University, has been excavating Vinča implementing various new techniques and methodologies to get answers to wide range of questions. This research has resulted in fine interpretation of individual cultural layers at Vinča .

In the 47 years between Vasić's and the present research the site suffered considerable damage from unauthorized excavations and looting.

== Occupation ==
=== Starčevo period, c. 5700–5300 BCE ===
The earliest deposits at Belo Brdo date to around 5700 BCE and belong to the Early Neolithic Starčevo culture. Evidence for this phase of occupation is scant owing to the disruption of the later Vinča settlement, and consists mainly of one large grave containing the remains of eleven males. This collective burial is unusual for Starčevo sites, where individual inhumations are the norm. Otherwise the Starčevo finds at Belo Brdo are unremarkable, and it is only one of several contemporary Starčevo settlements in the vicinity of modern Belgrade.

=== Vinča period, c. 5200–4500 BCE ===
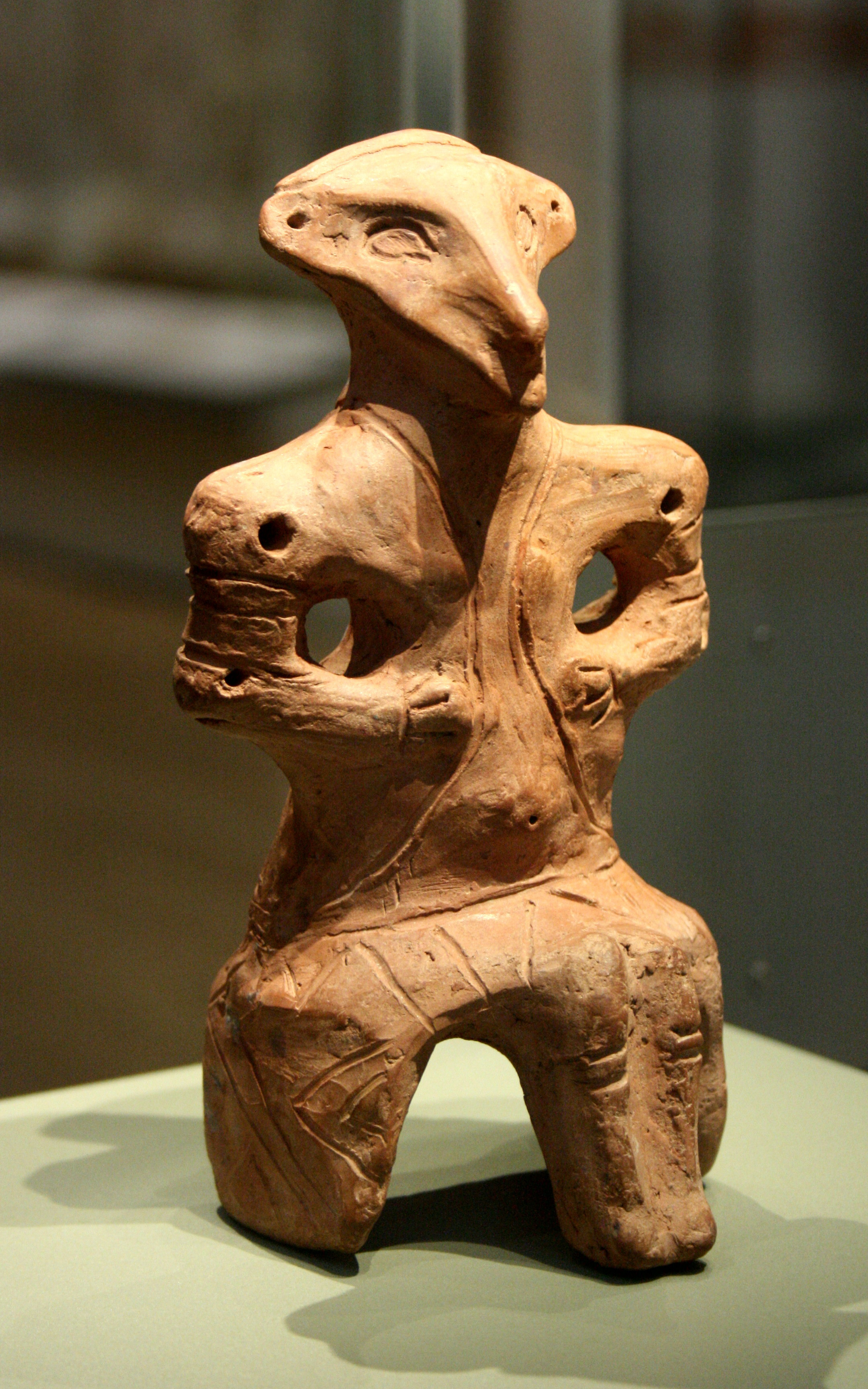
A clay figurine from Vinča-Belo Brdo on display at the British Museum.

A century after the abandonment of the Starčevo settlement Belo Brdo was occupied by people of the Vinča culture. A total of thirteen building horizons from this period make up the majority of the tell's stratigraphy, as new buildings were constructed on the debris left by periodic fires. Belo Brdo was a major Vinča centre and, at its peak, one of the largest settlements in Neolithic Europe. However, it was abandoned by 4900 BCE, some five centuries before the wider collapse of the Vinča culture.

As in the earlier Starčevo occupation, the Vinča houses at Belo Brdo were constructed primarily from wood and clay, but they also made use of levelled foundations, insulation and decoration with paint and wall coverings. In later phases large (40 x 60 m^{2}) rectangular buildings with internal divisions and fixed furniture (benches, braziers, waterwheels, tables, etc.) appeared alongside the predominant one-roomed dwellings. The Vinča settlement was arranged on straight streets, fenced and considerably larger than that of the Starčevo period. The inhabitants' subsisted based both on the cultivation of grains (einkorn, emmer and barley) and husbandry of domesticated animals (primarily cattle, but also goats, sheep and pigs). These agricultural practices probably continued to be supplemented by hunting and fishing in the surrounding environs.

In the Early Vinča phase Belo Brdo seems to have developed into a ritual centre for the entire region. The manufacture of various types of cult objects, including 'mushroom amulet' and 'animal head' jewellery made from semi-precious stones, first appeared there and then spread to other Vinča sites. The raw material for these objects often had to be imported from considerable distance, indicating also that from its earliest phase the site was part of large-scale exchange networks. It is therefore thought that Belo Brdo was a key place in a wider Vinča prestige economy, and an abundance of ritual paraphernalia, especially anthropomorphic figurines, is characteristic of the site. Another ritual innovation of Early Vinča phase Belo Brdo was the bucranium cult, where the painted skulls of cattle were fixed to the interior of houses. It is speculated that this practice may be linked to the wealth of individual households as measured in cattle. Later, however, Belo Brdo was to some degree eclipsed by the nearby site of Vršac, which became the centre of the much more widespread exchange of ornaments made from Spondylus shells. Subsequently, in the Late Vinča phase figurines became less widely circulated, and at the same time more standardised in form (in contrast to the many idiosyncratic styles of the Early Vinča phase). They also began to be inscribed with Vinča symbols, which perhaps indicates that competition and conflict was arising between different groups within Belo Brdo trying to assert control over the flow of ritual goods.

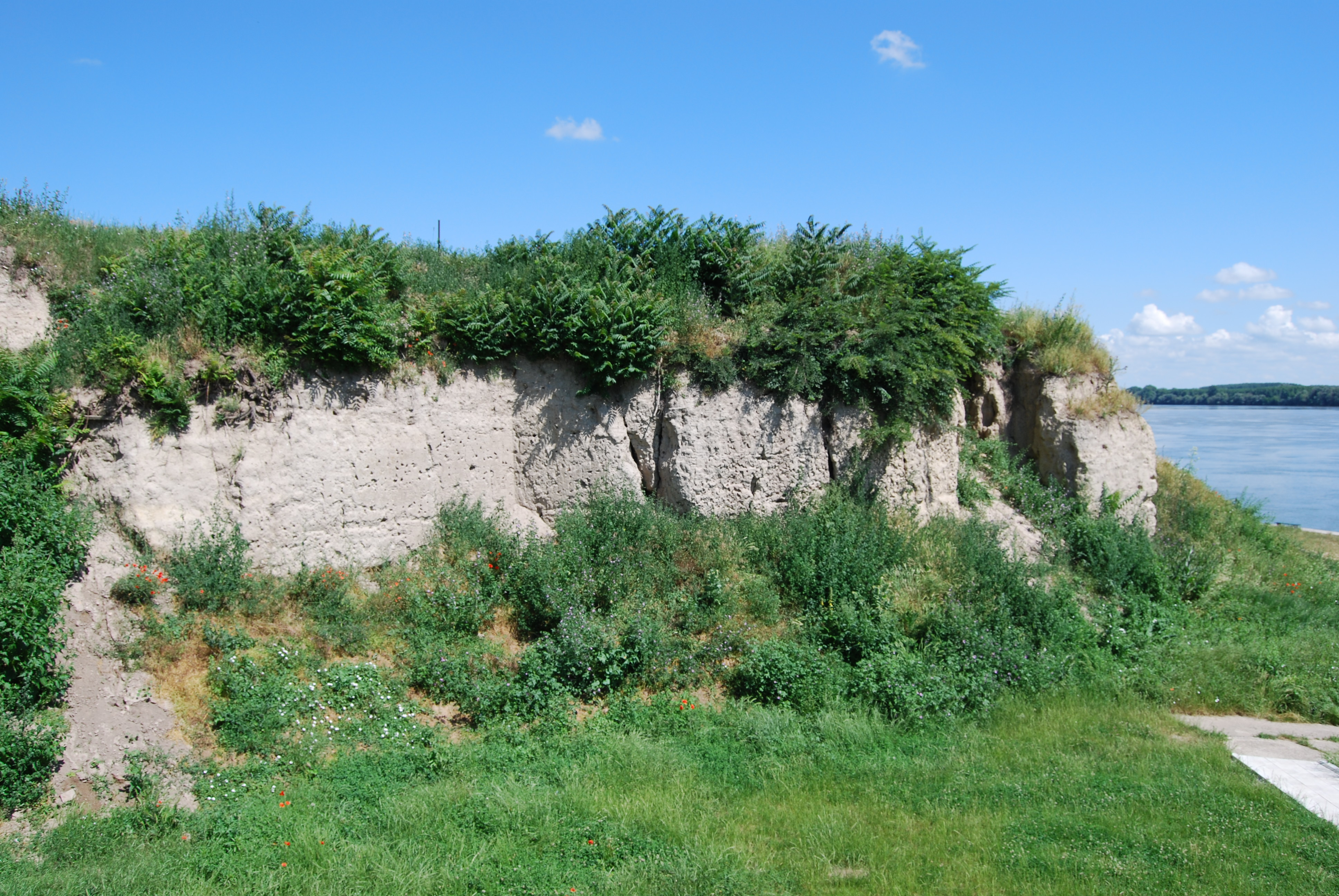
Vinča-Belo Brdo excavated tell site

=== Post-Vinča occupations ===
Belo Brdo has been occupied several times since the abandonment of the Vinča settlement, but not on the same scale. From the Copper Age there are four graves belonging to the Bodrogkeresztúr culture, a very small Baden culture settlement and some evidence of visits by people of the Kostolac culture. There was a large but short-lived Bronze Age settlement belonging to the Vatin culture. In the Iron Age the size of the tell made it an attractive location for a significant Celtic hill fort complete with defensive earthworks. The most recent historical use of the site was a substantial Old Serbian necropolis.

== Tourism ==
Vinča-Belo Brdo is classified as an Archaeological Site of Exceptional Importance by the Serbian government, entitling it to the highest level of state protection. Artefacts from the site are on display in exhibitions at the archaeological park, the National Museum of Belgrade, the Belgrade City Museum and the University of Belgrade Faculty of Philosophy.

Vinča archeological site is open for tourists.

== See also ==
- Lady of Vinča
