= Vinča =

Vinča Винча
- Suburban settlement
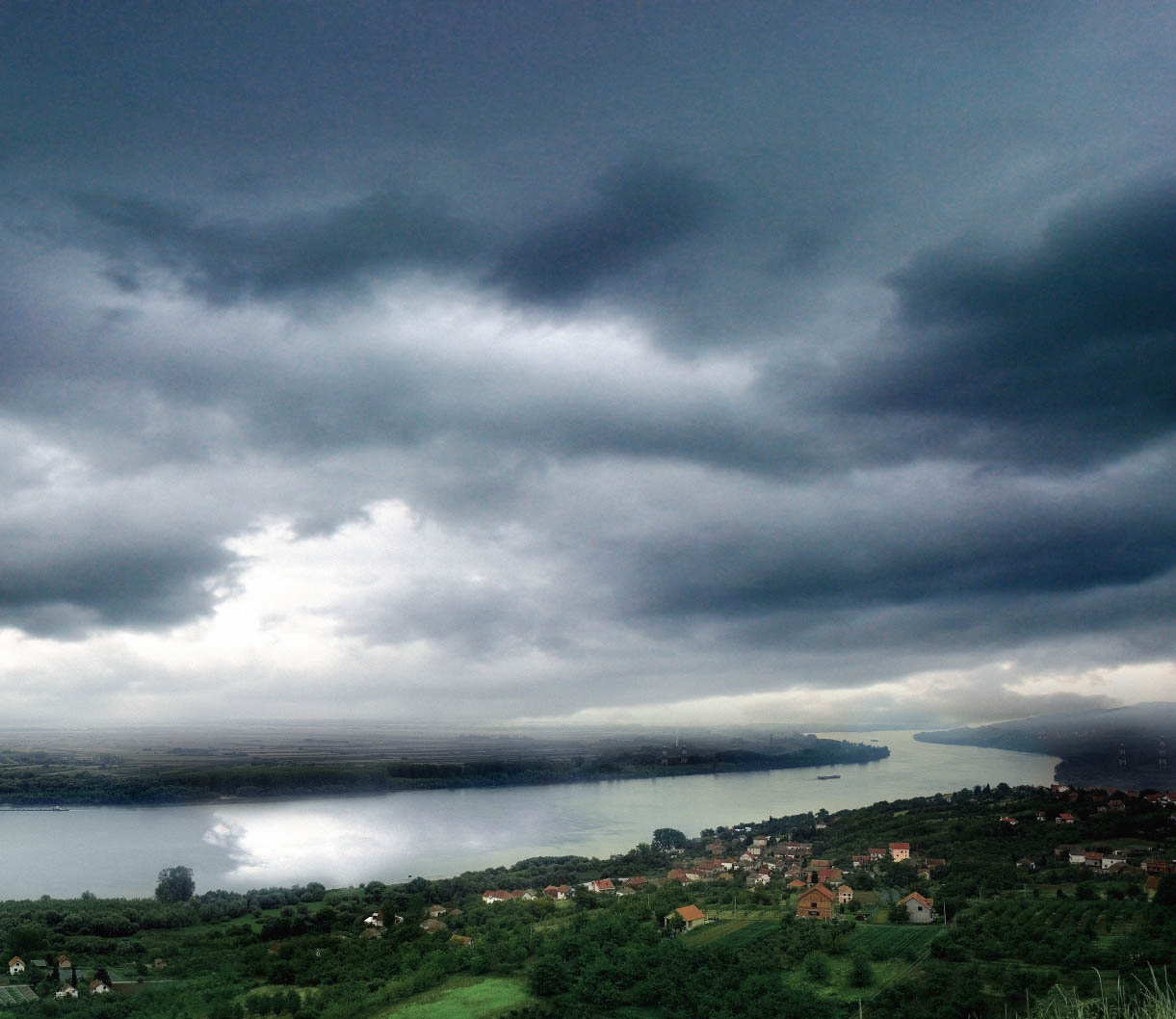
- Aerial view on Vinča and the Danube

- Location within Belgrade
- Coordinates: 44°45′20″N 20°36′47″E
- Country: Serbia
- Region: Belgrade
- Municipality: Grocka

Area
  - Total: 18.95 km^{2} (7.32 sq mi)

Population (2011)
  - Total: 6,779
  - Density: 357.7/km^{2} (926.5/sq mi)
- Time zone: UTC+1 (CET)
  - Summer (DST): UTC+2 (CEST)
- Postal code: 11351
- Area code: +381(0)11
- Car plates: BG

Vinča (Serbian Cyrillic: Винча, pronounced [ʋîːntʃa]) is a suburban settlement of Belgrade, Serbia. It is part of the municipality of Grocka. Vinča-Belo Brdo, an important archaeological site that gives its name to the Neolithic Vinča culture, is located in the village.

== Location ==
Vinča is located on the confluence of the Bolečica river into the Danube, on the Danube's right bank, 13 km (8.1 mi) east of Belgrade and 15 km (9.3 mi) west of its own municipal seat of Grocka. It is situated along the stream of Makački potok, which empties into the Bolečica.

== Population ==
Historical population
Year	Pop.	±%
1921	1,425	—
1948	1,767	+24.0%
1953	2,047	+15.8%
1961	2,247	+9.8%
1971	2,280	+1.5%
1981	3,653	+60.2%
1991	5,067	+38.7%
2002	5,819	+14.8%
2011	6,779	+16.5%

Vinča is statistically classified as a rural settlement (village). Originally it was situated 3 km from the road of Smederevski put, but as the settlement expanded, it now stretches from the Danube to the Smederevski put, making urbanistic connections to the surrounding settlements of Ritopek, Boleč, Leštane and Kaluđerica, though making one continuous built-up area with Belgrade itself. Like the surrounding settlements, Vinča is an immigrant settlement with steady population growth, and the total population number was 6,779 as of the 2011 census.

A small bridge across the Bolečica on the Smederevski put marks a place where boundaries of four settlements meet (Vinča, Ritopek, Leštane and Boleč). Together they would make a settlement with a population of 22,345 in 2002 and 26,275 in 2011.

== Economy ==
Vinča's economy is mostly based on agriculture, but it also experiences the most diversity of all the municipal settlements.

The experimental farm of Radmilovac, a section of the Agricultural Faculty of the Belgrade University, is located to the east. In 2006, reconstruction and expansion of the farm began, with new pools and projected covered areas that is intended to turn Radmilovac into an experimental ground for future agricultural production.

The area along the Smederevski put turns into a commercial zone as gas pumps, restaurants, workshops and supermarkets are built. Vinča is on the route of the projected highway in the Bolečica river valley (separating from the Belgrade-Niš highway at Bubanj Potok) and a new bridge over the Danube (Vinča-Omoljica bridge) but a construction date is not yet given.

Tourism is mostly centered on the archeological site of Belo brdo (Serbian for white hill) and the museum of the Vinča culture, with boat trips down the Danube from downtown Belgrade to the small Vinča dock, right below the find, with several fish restaurants on the bank. In order to strengthen the slope below the site, an embankment was built in the early 1980s, which is today a quay along the Danube.

Hotel 'Radmilovac' on the Smederevski put is the major such facility from Belgrade to Smederevo.

== Vinča Nuclear Institute ==
The Vinča Nuclear Institute was officially established on 21 January 1948 by the Serbian top physicist Pavle Savić as the Institute for Physics, though construction of the site began in 1947. On 15 October 1958, the institute was the site of a fatal criticality excursion in its heavy water-moderated research reactor. One researcher was killed and four others injured. The institute operated two research reactors. The larger 6.5 MW reactor achieved criticality in 1959 and was shut down in 1984. Another very low power reactor achieved criticality in 1958 and as of 2002 was operational. The institute was named the Institute for Physical Sciences 'Boris Kidrič' in 1953 and has its present name since 1 January 1992.

In the 1970s, a modern urban settlement with small residential buildings was constructed for the employees of the institute. In 2003, in an effort to secure the radioactive materials from the institute, the U.S. government aided Serbia in the removal of the material. In 2010, large convoys moved the remaining 2.5 tonnes of nuclear fuel to a reprocessing facility in Mayak in Russia.

== Landfill Vinča ==
Belgrade's city landfill (deponija) is located in Vinča. Official city landfill from 1960 used to be Ada Huja. When the new General Urban Plan (GUP) was adopted in the early 1970s, the projected location of the new landfill was the marsh around Veliko Selo in the municipality of Palilula. The municipality of Grocka endorsed the GUP, but in 1973 the idea of placing the landfill in Vinča was announced by the city. Grocka rejected the proposal and refused to endorse the new decision but the city administration bypassed the local authorities and the new landfill was opened in Vinča in 1977. The location was chosen specifically because of the clay bedrock, which will prevent the draining of the waste water deeper into the ground. However, the drainage system for both the water and the gas was never built, and the depositing of the water and gas at the bottom caused numerous problems since then.

As of 2017, the landfill covers an area of 68 ha (170 acres) and receives some 2,700 t (2,700 long tons; 3,000 short tons) of garbage daily, which includes not only the domestic waste but also earth and rubble. Out of 17 city municipalities, 13 use this landfill. The government decided in 2007 to remediate the landfill, but they soon stopped searching for the partner in the project. The landfill raised many ecological questions for years as only in the 2000s some of the major problems concerning waste managing began to solve. However, despite some recent improvements, the landfill is still far from the European standards of environmental management, like leachate collection and treatment system. It is, as of 2014, not only the Europe's biggest landfill, with between 6,650,000 and 9,500,000 tons of waste deposited in it, but also largest untreated landfill on the continent. Since the city's plan on the waste management for the 2011-202 period, authorities try to make a deal with investors, in the form of the strategic partnership to manage the landfill. With layers of untreated garbage that reach 70 m (230 ft), the landfill is considered to be the most problematic ecological spot in Europe.

In August 2021, city officials estimated that the landfill, after 44 years of existence, contains 20 million tonnes (20,000,000 long tons; 22,000,000 short tons) of garbage, annually receives additional 0.5 million tonnes (490,000 long tons; 550,000 short tons) and, in total, released over 4 billion cubic metres (140×10^{9} cu ft) of methane in the atmosphere. The largest deposits are estimated to be 100 metres (330 ft) deep.

=== Fires ===
==== 2017 ====
The devastating 2014 Southeast Europe floods triggered a mass wasting in one part of the landfill. As a result of the mass wasting which continued, and of the fact that the waste is not being treated, just piled on the top, a pockets of methane formed deep under the garbage layers. On 18 May 2017 several of these pockets, on different locations and at the depths of 10 to 15 m (33 to 49 ft), bursted into flames. Being covered with dirt and earth, fire above the ground was extinguished quickly, but the smoldering in the deep continued. Wide section of Belgrade was covered in smoke and bad smell, sometimes completely, forcing citizens to use masks. Smoggy neighborhoods included Lešće, Višnjica, Višnjička Banja, Krnjača, Kotež, Borča, Rospi Ćuprija, Karaburma, Slanci and Veliko Selo. By 23 May 2017, the smoke reached downtown Belgrade. As the methane fire can not be extinguished with water, it has to be covered with earthy materials which are to isolate methane from oxygen, all trucks bringing earth to the landfill were rerouted to cover the burning section. However, as that area is located on the mass wasting ground, it went slow, preventing the quick damping of the fire. As the winds changed, the smoke turned from spreading upstream the Danube to Belgrade, to downstream, in the direction of Smederevo. In order to extinguish the fire completely, for the first time was used a concentrated solution of the brown algae. The preparation acts like the fermentor, organically decomposing the matter, binding methane, ammonia, and oxygen thus preventing the spreading of the fire.

In June smoky haze and bad smell continued to cover parts of Belgrade, especially in the mornings and evenings, and to spread even further, reaching the hilly Dedinje, and more distant Mostar interchange and Vidikovac. City Institute for Public Health continuously issued statements that the levels of the basic pollutants in the air are not above the allowed levels, but also admitted that the actions to extinguish the fire are not solving the problem and that "sensitive groups" should "reduce time spent outdoors in the case of smoky haze". Among the substances checked by the Institute are carbon monoxide, nitrogen oxides, sulfur dioxide, ground level ozone, suspended particulate matter below 10 μm (PM 10) and phenols. However, dean of the University of Belgrade's Faculty of Chemistry, Ivan Gržetić, stated that the smoke is not that harmless, since Vinča is not a managed landfill but rather a plain, unregulated dump. He said that the fire probably started years ago at the much deeper level, 20 to 40 m (66 to 131 ft), and that it is highly likely that the fumes contain polychlorinated dibenzofurans and dibenzodioxins, but that Serbia has no special measuring devices to check their levels. He asserted that those compounds are cancerogenic but a good thing is that the smoke is partially dispersed by wind before it reaches the city. He added that Vinča is probably going to burn for years and suggested the piling of the porous pipes which would conduct the methane into the atmosphere.

Only then, after almost a month, city administration addressed the issue. Mayor Siniša Mali stated that there is a problem, but not that much of a problem as it is presented, and that "such things happen". In order to prove him that burning garbage is a problem, a group of activists brought two metal barrels under the windows of the City Hall and burned rubbish in them. Commenting on the performance, titled "Greetings from Vinča", Mali said that it is "irresponsible that some five people come to me in front of the City Hall, light fires and scare my people". Acting ombudsman of Serbia, Miloš Janković asked from all involved institutions to make public, not only the results, but also to disclose all information about the way they measure the fumes and a detailed list of all substances covered by those measurements. He was supported by Rodoljub Šabić, state Commissioner for the information of public importance, but the city administration called their initiative "utterly pointless, unjustified and malicious" and that the intended purpose of their action is to "scare the citizens and to raise panic". On 26 June 2017 the city garbage managing company, "Gradska čistoća", announced that after filling of the burning section of the landfill with over 65,000 m^{3} (2,300,000 cu ft) of earth, the fire was extinguished. Only then, the information that at one point the exploding methane burned on an area of 20 ha (49 acres) (or 30% of the landfill) was disclosed. Still, authorities stated that they can not be sure if the fire was really extinguished in the deep.

==== 2019 ====
In October 2019, smog began to engulf the city. Several specialized foreign pollution and air quality sites reported Belgrade as one of the most polluted cities in the world in this period, ahead of traditionally most polluted Asian cities like Beijing, Jakarta and Delhi. Reasons were various: warm above average autumn and high difference between daily and night temperatures, high atmospheric pressure, lack of rain and wind, massive stubble burning around the city and traffic pollution, but experts claimed there is no need for panicking. Still, health recommendations were issued for both the healthy and ill citizens, including to spend more time indoors as the city was covered in dirty fog.

Citizens then began to report fire and smoke on the landfill, claiming it's one of the sources of the smog, but this was denied by the authorities. Even after photos and videos of the fires were posted, denials continued. When reporters and several groups of activists wanted to visit the landfill and check the situation, the police blocked access to the facility. Authorities then admitted that there are fires, but not open ones, while minister Trivan added this is "not a rare occurrence" and that "soon, everything will be under control". Ombudsman Zoran Pašalić began proceedings regarding the way public was notified on the Vinča fire by the administration.

==== 2020 ====
In January 2020, citizens again reported smoke from the landfill, which coincided with one of the worst periods of pollution and smog in Belgrade's history. Authorities this time admitted immediately that the smoke, but not the fire, is a normal appearance in such type of landfills. As the mass wasting is now constantly active, during each landslide the cracks open which release methane, which in turn produces fumes and smoke. It was stated that the mobile units on the non-stop watch are organized to deal with the problem when it appears. As media reported of new fires in February, the authorities threatened that this is fake news and spreading of panic, saying again it is normal for the landfill to smother all the time. They also stated that the dam, which cost €2 million, was built in 2018 to prevent the draining of the polluted water into the Danube, though no one mentioned this dam before nor reported its construction. Few weeks later it was said that the dam was finished in March 2019.

Company administration threatened to sue anyone who continue to claim that the landfill is burning. In March 2020, despite the massive reduction of traffic in Belgrade due to the Coronavirus outbreak, pollution in Belgrade skyrocketed, followed again with smell and haze, despite the strong košava wind. Head of one of the trade unions in the company "Gradska čistoća" which manages the landfill, Željko Veselinović, named the latest fire in Vinča as one of the sources of the pollution. Being accused of spreading fear and panic with false information, head of the company announced criminal complaint against Veselinović, repeating that "all landfill processes are results of natural occurrences". In November 2020, private investors behind the massive reconstruction of the landfill admitted that the fires are "frequent and constant".

=== Future ===
On 1 April 2015, city manager Goran Vesić announced that the private strategic partner will be chosen to clean, upgrade, modernize and operate the landfill. He said that by June or July 2015 the invitation for tender will be opened and that the partner will be known by the end of the year. June 2016 was announced as the date when the contract should be signed while January 2020 was set as the date when the new waste-to-energy plant should open. 11 companies applied but in the later phases, that number fell down to 4 or 5, and the city officials (Vesić, mayor Mali, deputy mayor Andreja Mladenović) also couldn't agree on the amount of the investment (ranging from 250 to 400 million) or the duration of the deal (16, 20 or 25 years). In February 2017 Vesić stated that the selection of the bidders is in the finishing phase and that in the first half of 2017 the strategic partner will be selected. On 11 June 2017, during the fire, mayor Mali said that the Vinča problem will be solved on 6 July, when the bids from the "largest world companies" will be opened. The date was moved to 13 July and the deadline for selecting the partner to August. When the bids were opened on 13 July 2017 it turned out there is only one, French-Japanese consortium of Suez-Itochu. If accepted, even in the best case scenario, no work will begin before the second half of 2018. The "Ne davimo Beograd" movement, which opposes the politics of the city administration and continuously organizes the protests and performances, stated that the strategy partnerships for the landfills, in long terms, proves inefficient and unprofitable, citing Barcelona as an example. The city accepted the offer and the contract was signed on 29 September 2017.

Mayor Mali stated that the project as a good investment and that contract is transparent. Political opposition claimed that the contract may be "even more scandalous than the one on Belgrade Waterfront" and openly accused the administration that the entire project is just a scheme to drain money from the city. Partial documentation, though not the full contract, have been handed to the city deputies and was posted online by the Transparency Serbia. The analysis of the City defender's office, needed for the city to adopt the contract, wasn't positive. City defender stated: "Translation of the contract has not been done in accordance with the rules of Serbian language and in case of different interpretations of the Serbian and English versions, precedence has the English version, per Article 71, section 9a of the contract. The English version was not analyzed by the defender's office and the majority of the contract is not susceptible to changes. We are also noting that (one) contractual part is also (functioning as) an arbitration and that text of the contract uses legal terms which are not provided by the positive law, therefore we are not in a position to confirm, with certainty, whether they are in accordance with the positive law."

The deal includes the construction of an incineration plant. According to "Ne davimo Beograd" and environmentalist Vladimir Radojičić, the incineration will cost citizens obligatory €1.15 billion in the next 30 years, or €38 million per year, which is the amount paid to Suez-Itochu by the contract. Instead of making much lesser investments in promotion and expansion of recycling and construction of smaller recycle units which would employ hundreds of the poorest citizens, city administration decided to pour huge amount of money to private investor. Also, city is denouncing a valuable resource of recycled garbage this way and is additionally polluting the air. Strategic documents on the garbage management never envisioned the incineration plant, quite the opposite. According to the reports, the garbage will not be sorted prior to incineration, so everything from the paints, batteries, PVC, etc. will be burned.

Despite constant claims by the opponents of the project that city, at the expense of its citizens, will pay to the investor, now a deputy mayor Goran Vesić, stated that the project won't cost citizens a dime. But already in 2017, manager of the "Suez" in Serbia, Philippe Thiel, stated that "payments from the City of Belgrade to the newly formed company, owned by the "Suez" and the "Itochu", will be significantly financed from the new, special tax for waste management" and on 1 October 2019, a new item on the communal bill was added, regarding the "management of the waste". Also, the city will now collect communal bills from all 17 city municipalities, instead of only central 10, as until that date.

On 6 October 2019, Vesić announced that the works on the landfill makeover began. The existing landfill will be sanitized, re-cultivated and closed as concurrently the new landfill will be built. The combined waste treatment (incineration) plant will be built, which would also produce electricity and heat from the waste. The planned power capacity is 103 kW with treatment of 43 tons of waste per hour. The energy will be available for the Belgraders, but the city will have to pay higher prices than the average. Capacity is planned to 340.000 tons yearly. Another plant will treat the construction waste and rubble, with the capacity of 100.000 tons per year. Treatment products will be reused in building, road construction, etc. There are plans for third and fourth treatment plants: for water treatment (which will then be used as technical water) and for collecting landfill gases, which will be used for energy production. Biogas will be primarily used for energy production needed for the facilities on the landfill, and the surplus will be distributed to the city. Construction of the heat pipeline from Vinča to the heating plant in Belgrade's neighborhood of Konjarnik also began. It is planned for the gas produced by the secondary waste separation process from the incineration plant, which will be used for heating.

In October 2019, European Investment Bank (EIB) announced it refused to fund the incineration plant. After the internal evaluation, the EIB decided to concur with the negative findings of the European Commission and to withdraw from the project. The bank stated the project is going to affect both the citizens of Belgrade (as the health risk) and all citizens of Serbia (as the project is not in accordance with the European Union negotiations chapter No. 27, which would prevent Serbia to join the EU). Minister of Environmental Protection Goran Trivan said this was not true, that the plant will be built by the "highest European standards", but that EIB withdrew because of the politics. EU delegation in Serbia then explained that incineration should be allowed only for the small part of the waste, which can not be recycled or treated in any other way, while by this project much larger quantities of waste will be burnt and that government should "adjust" the project. Private investors said they will continue the funding.

Investors rebutted the claims on bad technology claiming the process, when finished, will provide much cleaner air in Belgrade. The waste burning technology is the same as in Europe (450 facilities in European Union) and Japan (23 in Tokyo). The reverse acting grate Martin, used for incineration, is used in 90% of waste-to-energy facilities. The smoke will be filtered by the Selective non-catalytic reduction system, and emitted into the atmosphere from the 60.5 m (198 ft) tall chimneys. The air will be constantly monitored. Several kilometers long pipeline and canals grid is built which will drain and collect both atmospheric precipitation and wastewater, channeling it to the foothills of old landfill. There, it will be treated by the reverse osmosis process, and, as the clear water, conducted via the creek of Ošljanski Potok into the Danube.

In February 2020, the schedule of the works was announced: waste treatment facility will be finished by mid-April; construction of the power plant on waste energy will start in the mid-2020; finishing of the wastewater treatment facility is set for the end of 2020; the entire project will be finished by the end of 2022.

The new sanitation landfill should be opened in early 2021 when the recovery of the old one will start. 42 ha (100 acres) will be covered with 1.2 m (3 ft 11 in) thick layer of mineral materials, but also by the geo-synthetic membrane which will prevent water to reach inside the landfill, but also to prevent carbon gases to spread out of it. The reclamation should be finished in 2024, after several stages in 30 months. Opening of the sanitation landfill was again postponed (from 30 September 2020, to 31 January 2021, then to March). The main issue is the landslide of the old landfill, especially a massive one in December 2020, when part of the road was also destroyed. In 2021 landslide occurred in the section of the new, still unfinished landfill. This caused changes in the project and additional works, so the opening was postponed for the "second quarter" of the year. Old landfill was officially declared closed in August 2021. It was announced in November 2021 that 20 metres (66 ft) wide and 6 kilometres (3.7 mi) long green belt will be formed around the landfill.

Deadlines were moved again, and it was stated that the power plant will be operational, in the beginning at a lower level, in January 2023, but the "final testing" was then announced for February. If successful, the energy production will start in April, while the heating will start during the 2023/2024 heating season. New management then announced that further enhancement of the entire project will be needed, as they misjudged the waste quantity almost by a quarter. Instead of 510,000 tons yearly, 625,000 tons are produced by the residents. As the power plant is still not treating the waste, from August 2021 when the new landfill became operational, to January 2023, entire capacity for the storage was filled, so the new storage area was finished by the end of 2022. The management stated that "Belgraders, obviously produce more communal waste faster and faster", while the "extraction of the reusable waste components progresses slowly". Even when the power plant becomes optimally operational, it will treat 340,000 tons yearly, which would leave 285,000 tons of untreated waste, instead of the previously planned 170,000 tons. Works on the stabilization of the old landfill are planned for the second quarter of 2023.

== Politics ==
A recent motion, as a result of big economic and demographic discrepancy between the western and eastern parts of the municipality, mentions Vinča of the possible seat of the future municipality formed from the western part of the municipality of Grocka, comprising Kaluđerica, Boleč, Leštane, and Ritopek.

== Bibliography ==
- Mala Prosvetina Enciklopedija, Third edition (1985); Prosveta; ISBN 86-07-00001-2
- Jovan Đ. Marković (1990): Enciklopedijski geografski leksikon Jugoslavije; Svjetlost-Sarajevo; ISBN 86-01-02651-6
- Srpska porodična enciklopedija, Vol. V (2006); Narodna knjiga and Politika NM; ISBN 86-331-2734-2 (NK)
