= Bučí =

- Municipality
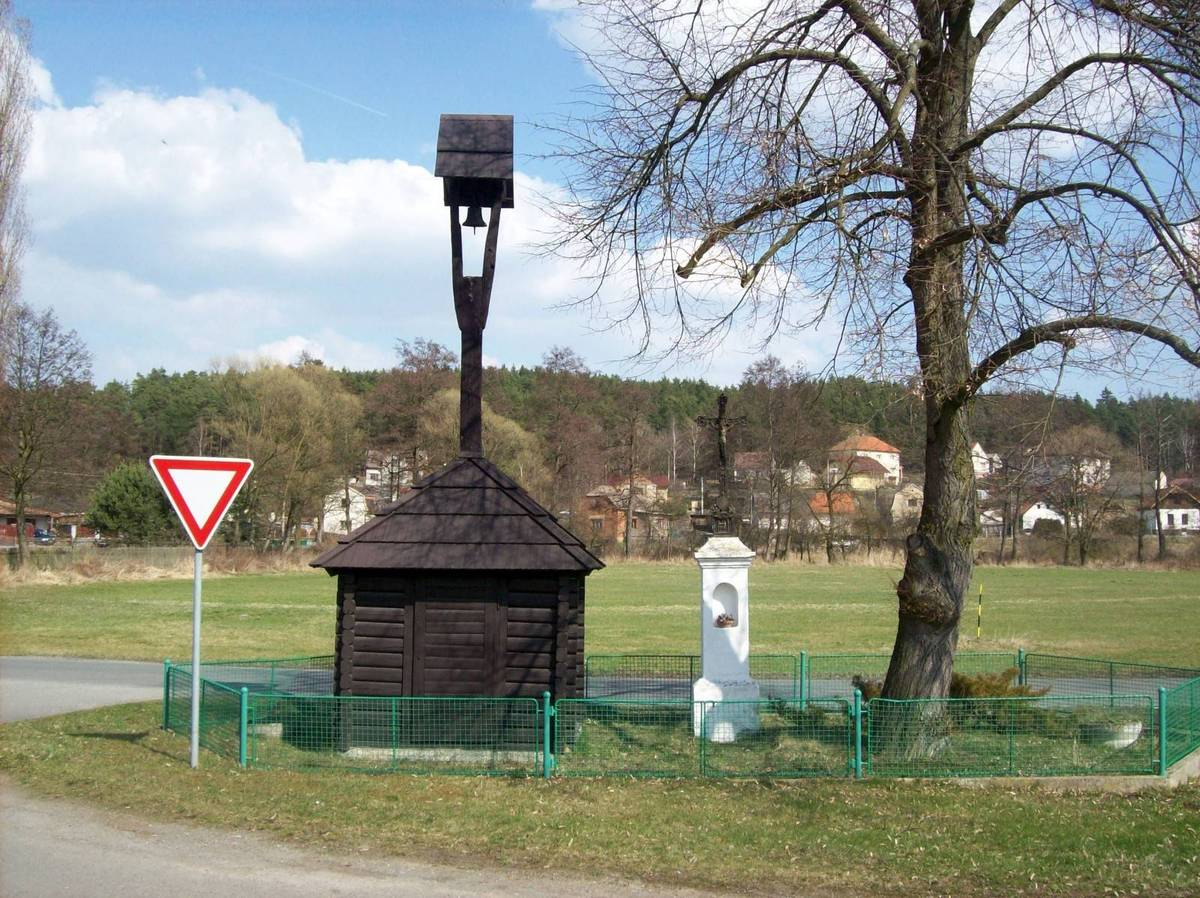
- Belfry

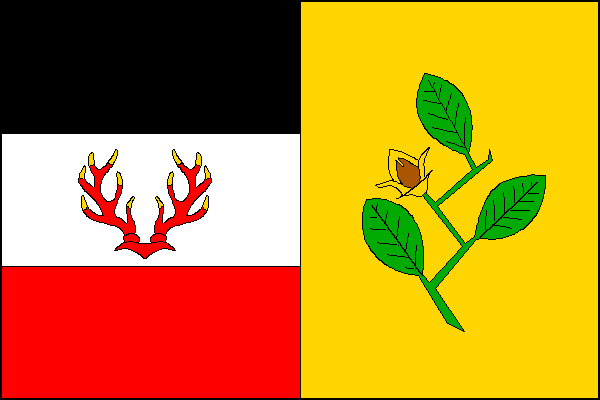
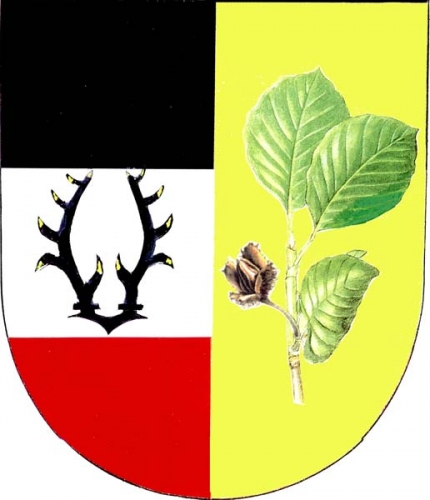
- Flag Coat of arms

- Location in the Czech Republic
- Coordinates: 49°53′7″N 13°18′10″E
- Country: Czech Republic
- Region: Plzeň
- District: Plzeň-North
- First mentioned: 1240

Area
  - Total: 2.39 km^{2} (0.92 sq mi)
- Elevation: 425 m (1,394 ft)

Population (2026-01-01)
  - Total: 183
  - Density: 76.6/km^{2} (198/sq mi)
- Time zone: UTC+1 (CET)
  - Summer (DST): UTC+2 (CEST)
- Postal code: 331 52
- Website: www.buci.cz

Bučí is a municipality and village in Plzeň-North District in the Plzeň Region of the Czech Republic. It has about 200 inhabitants.

== Demographics ==
Historical population
Year	Pop.	±%
1869	167	—
1880	173	+3.6%
1890	149	−13.9%
1900	155	+4.0%
1910	168	+8.4%
1921	172	+2.4%
1930	192	+11.6%
1950	155	−19.3%
1961	178	+14.8%
1970	169	−5.1%
1980	168	−0.6%
1991	137	−18.5%
2001	137	+0.0%
2011	143	+4.4%
2021	162	+13.3%
Source: Censuses
