= Bubanj Potok =

Bubanj Potok Бубањ Поток
- Suburban settlement
- Location of Bubanj Potok within Belgrade
- Coordinates: 44°43′13″N 20°32′29″E
- Country: Serbia
- Region: Belgrade
- Municipality: Voždovac
- Time zone: UTC+1 (CET)
  - Summer (DST): UTC+2 (CEST)
- Area code: +381(0)11
- Car plates: BG

Bubanj Potok (Serbian Cyrillic: Бубањ Поток) is a non-residential suburban settlement of Belgrade, the capital of Serbia. It is located in Belgrade's municipality of Voždovac.

== Location ==
Bubanj Potok is located on the highway Belgrade–Niš, in the valley of the same name, a section of the valley of the Bolečica river, where many smaller creeks, some of them intermittent, flow into the Bolečica: Bubanj Potok, Zavojnička reka, Vranovac, Kamena voda, Gleđevac, etc. East of the valley is Leštane, municipality of Grocka, while Beli Potok on the west, mountain Avala on the southwest and Zuce on the south, are in the municipality of Voždovac. The southernmost tip of Zvezdara municipality is just north of it.

== Characteristics ==
Bubanj Potok is named after the creek of the same name and means "drum creek" in Serbian. It is a non-residential settlement which spawns around the crossroads of the highway and the Kružni put, the major road connecting the settlements on the southern outskirts of Belgrade. Major facilities in the settlement include:

- Belgrade's largest open car market Bubanj Potok.
- Restaurant Bubanj Potok with a large truck parking.
- Several cement plants and some other building facilities in the process of construction at the moment.
- Major interchange on the highway-Kružni put crossroads will be widened when the Belgrade beltway will be finished and this would be the switchpoint from the highway and beltway to the projected Vinča–Omoljica bridge.

=== Military complex ===
Vast complex of the military barracks and the training shooting ground "Bubanj Potok" was heavily bombed and largely destroyed in the 1999 NATO bombing of Serbia. Construction of the complex originally began in 1966, during the Youth work action "Bubanj Potok 66", but was expanded in later years. Some 5,000 youth workers participated in the construction.

=== IKEA store ===
Major changes, including the displacement of the toll houses which were synonymous for Bubanj Potok for decades, started in April 2016 when the construction of an IKEA store began. Over 2,300 piles were drilled deep into the ground, over 300.000 m^{3} (10,594.4 cu ft) of material was poured to fill the construction site, old roads have been displaced and the new access roads have been constructed, power lines were elevated to a higher level and 2.2 km (1.4 mi) of the Zavojnička reka (upper section of the Bolečica river) have been regulated. The building, which should cover an area of 36,000 m^{2} (390,000 sq ft), will use the green technologies: geothermal springs, solar panels, LED lights, electric cars' chargers and the work of art systems for the disposal of garbage and waste water purification. A special bus will connect the city with the store and the talks are in progress between IKEA and the Belgrade's city transportation company, GSP Belgrade, for the new public bus line (currently, bus line 306 which goes to Leštane, only intermittently drives to Bubanj Potok). It will be the first IKEA store in Serbia and one of the largest in the region. As the store and the adjoining parking, with the 1,375 parking spots, will cover a lot of 12 ha (30 acres), while IKEA bought a neighboring lot of 19 ha (47 acres), too, future expansion is probable.

The store was opened on 10 August 2017. It was announced that it will sell 9,500 products, of which only 2 will be actually made in Serbia: wooden cutting boards and rolling pins and the prices will correspond to those "in the region", though the average salaries in Serbia are lower. Ceremonial opening was attended by the President of Serbia Aleksandar Vučić, government ministers and the mayor of Belgrade Siniša Mali. A new public transportation bus line No. 70 was formed just for the store, as it is located outside of the urban area of Belgrade.

=== Toll booths Bubanj Potok ===
Built in the 1970s, the toll booths Bubanj Potok, for decades marked the entrance into the Belgrade from the Niš direction. On 13 April 2017 toll booth became defunct as the new one, Vrčin, further down toward Niš was open for traffic. The toll booths were completely demolished in August 2017.

== Transportation ==
Bubanj Potok is known for its traffic importance. Apart from the existing large interchange on the highway, crossroad with the Kružni put and former toll booths, it is projected as the future crossroad of the Belgrade bypass and accompanying railroad, both of which would proceed directly from here to the future Vinča-Omoljica Bridge across the Danube, to Pančevo. As for the bypass itself, Bubanj Potok is the marking point between its two projected sections, Ostružnica-Bubanj Potok and Bubanj Potok-Vinča. The section from Ostružnica will be 19.5 km (12.1 mi) long and the Minister for transportation, Zorana Mihajlović announced that works will begin in August 2018, with a deadline in 2020. The final section, to Vinča, still has no set dates. A planned, 1.3-kilometre-long (4,265 ft) "Bubanj Potok" tunnel is part of the project.

The highway section through the area is known for the accidents. The section is built as the narrowing curve on the downhill slope, with both ascending and descending angles being 7%, which is deemed too much for highway. The curve has a radius of 300 metres (980 ft) which makes it the largest bend between Belgrade and Niš. Several solutions were proposed to fix the problem. They include reducing the allowed speed in this section to 80 kilometres per hour (50 mph), reconstruction of the curve which would enlarge the cross-section inclination, and relocation of the narrowing (from three lanes into two lanes and one shoulder) further away from the curve. The best proposed fix, however, is a tunnel, which would be less than a kilometre long. When the highway was planned in the early 1970s, the engineers were aware of the problem and proposed the tunnel, but the idea was dropped.
