= Georg Lunge =

German chemist (1839–1923)

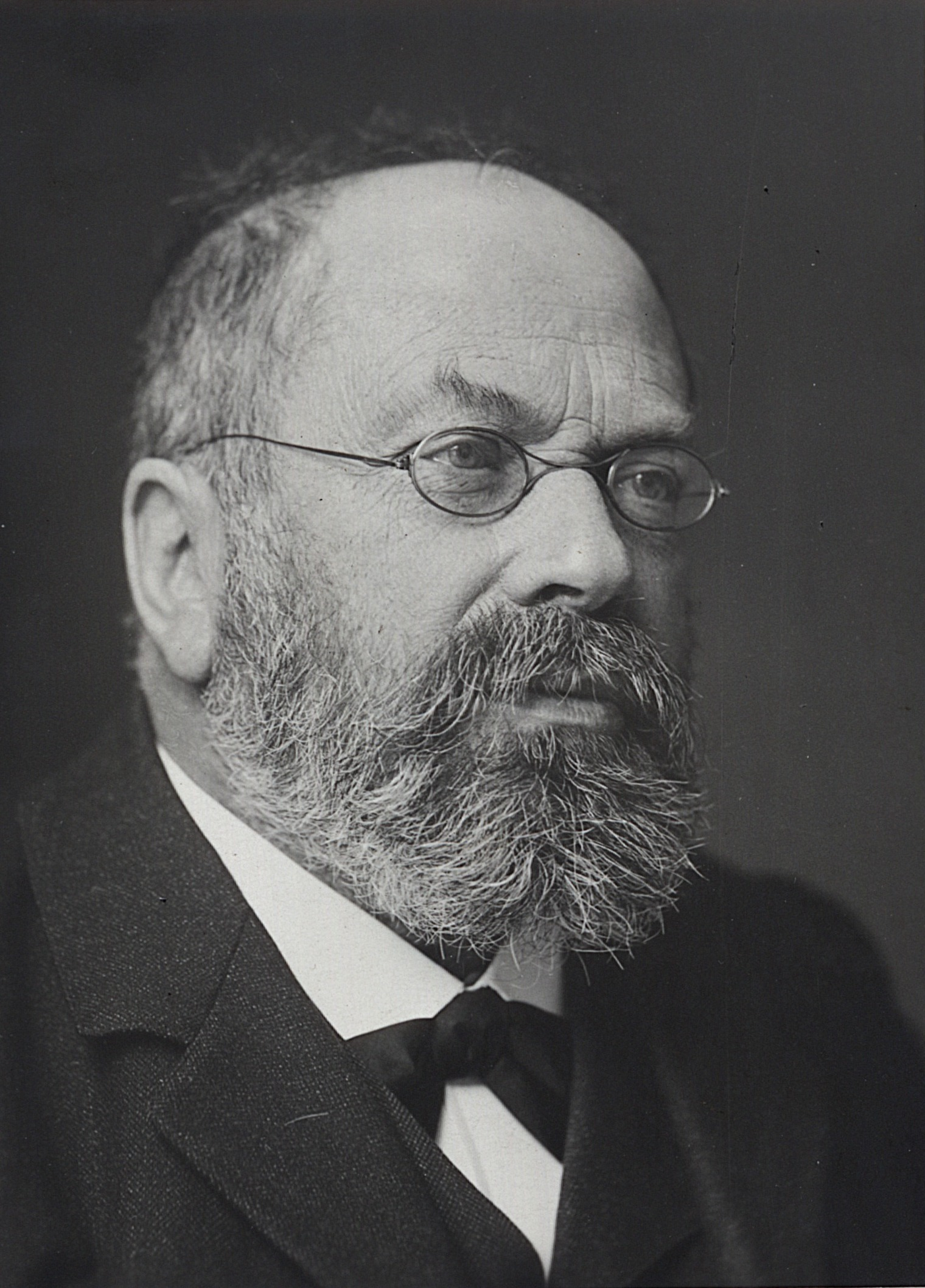
- Georg Lunge
- Born: 15 September 1839; Breslau, Kingdom of Prussia
- Died: 3 January 1923 (aged 83); Zürich, Switzerland
- Education: University of Heidelberg, University of Breslau
- Known for: Lunge reagent
- Scientific career
- Fields: organic chemistry
- Workplaces: ETH Zurich.
- Doctoral advisor: Ferdinand Cohn

Georg Lunge (15 September 1839 – 3 January 1923) was a German chemist.

== Biography ==
Lunge was born in Breslau on 15 September 1839. He studied at Heidelberg (under Robert Bunsen) and Breslau, graduating at the latter university in 1859, to work with Ferdinand Cohn. Turning his attention to technical chemistry, he became chemist at several works both in Germany and England, and in 1876 he was appointed professor of technical chemistry at ETH Zurich.

Lunge's original contributions cover a very wide field, dealing both with technical processes and analysis. In addition, he was a voluminous writer, enriching scientific literature with many standard works. His treatises Coal Tar and Ammonia, Destillation des Steinkohlentheers and Sulphuric Acid and Alkali, established his position as the highest authority on these subjects, while the Chemische-technische Untersuchungs-Methoden, to which he contributed, testified to his researches in technical analysis.

His jubilee was celebrated in Zürich on 15 September 1909 and he died in Zürich on 3 January 1923.
