= Leštane =

Leštane Лештане
- Suburban settlement
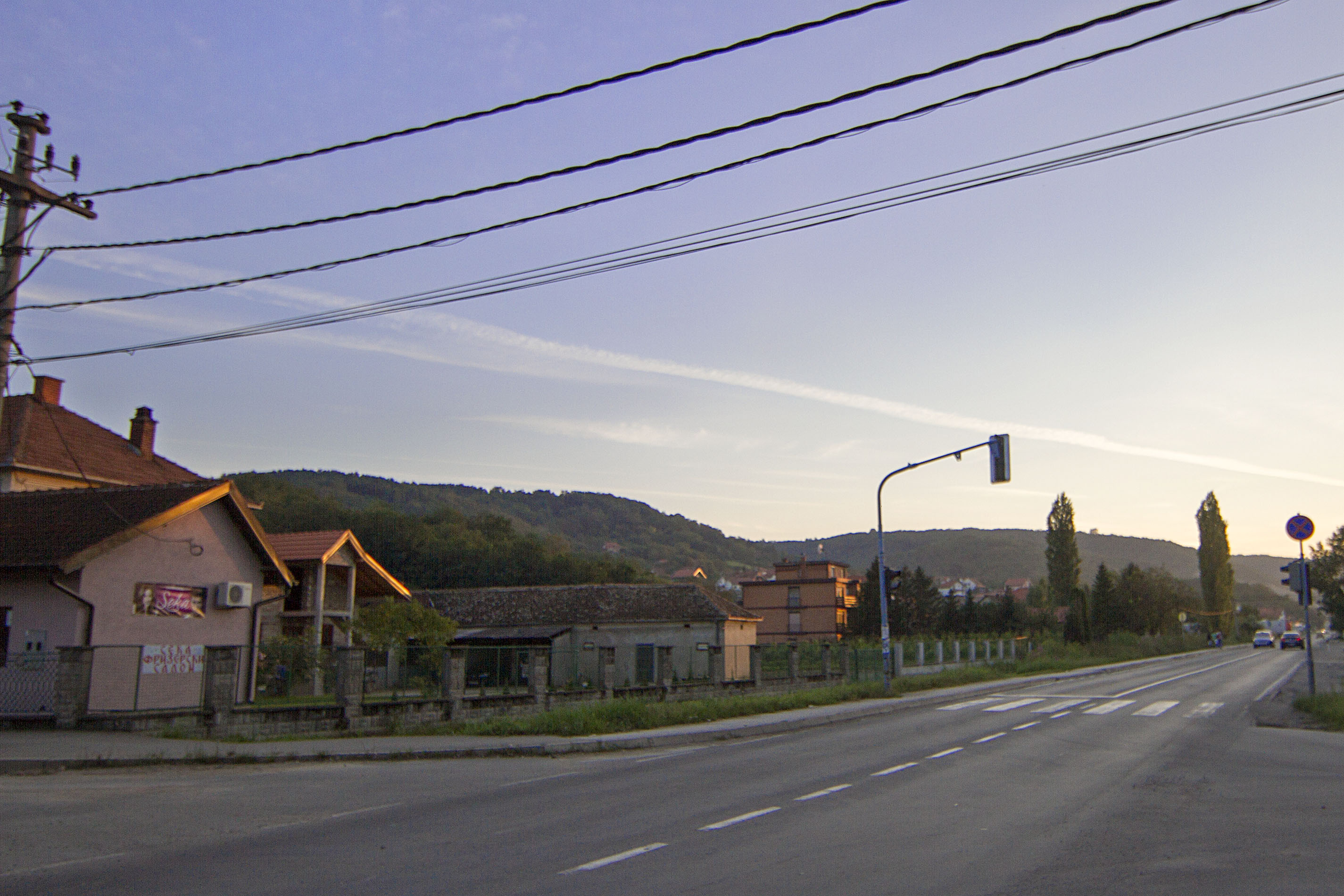

- Location within Belgrade
- Coordinates: 44°43′50″N 20°34′33″E
- Country: Serbia
- Region: Belgrade
- Municipality: Grocka

Area
  - Total: 9.34 km^{2} (3.61 sq mi)
- Time zone: UTC+1 (CET)
  - Summer (DST): UTC+2 (CEST)
- Area code: +381(0)11
- Car plates: BG

Leštane (Serbian Cyrillic: Лештане) is a suburban settlement in Belgrade, Serbia. It is located in the municipality of Grocka.

== Location ==
Leštane is located 15 km east of Belgrade, originally further away from the major roads. As the settlement expanded, it reached both major Smederevski put and Kružni put roads and, in the last decade, expanded even further.

It is located at the mouth of the Kaluđerički Potok into the Bolečica river. The name of the settlement is one of the variants for hazel grove in the Serbian language.

== Population ==
Leštane is one of the fastest growing suburbs of Belgrade, especially since the mid-1970s, experiencing an annual growth of over 10% in the 1971-1981 period. It is still classified as a rural settlement (village), though agriculture is no longer an essential branch of the economy. Population of Leštane:

- 1971 - 1,484
- 1981 - 4,019
- 1991 - 6,681
- 2002 - 8,492

Leštane is more crowded than its municipal seat, Grocka. Thousands of people migrated to the settlement from southern Serbia and especially Kosovo and Metohija in the 1970s, and after the exodus of Serbs from Kosovo and Goranci in 1999, new thousands settled in Leštane, so it is estimated it might have reached up to 15,000 inhabitants today.

== Living conditions and economy ==
Like most suburbs of Belgrade, Leštane has been expanding uncontrolled and without any urbanistic plans. This causes communal problems that the settlement is experiencing. Such as: the sewage system, waterworks and transportation, curved streets, without any order and, in many cases, without pavement. All of this brings problems in settlements during rain.

Until the late 1970s and early 1980s, the economy of Leštane was based mainly on agriculture. Still, since then, a boom in privately owned small companies boosted the economy and attracted a new population to migrate to the settlement. Some significant economic facilities are a shoe factory, an outpost of the National Customs Service, construction company Geosonda and a power relay station, a major one for the eastern parts of Belgrade, which was severely damaged during the NATO bombing of Yugoslavia in 1999.

In the 2000s, the area from the crossroad of Smederevski put and Kružni put, along the Bolečica River, was designed as an industrial zone (Industrijska zona Leštane). So far, several hangars, construction and transportation companies, a parquetry factory, and a few smaller facilities (medicine factory, etc.) have been established, while some significant areas are still in the process of construction.

A small open farmer's market developed in the 1980s along the Smederevski put, next to the Vinča community health center. It expanded a bit in time, but the communal situation surrounding the market worsened. In February 2019, it was announced that a new market would be built. It will be a fully closed, energy-efficient, one-storey building with a total floor area of 1,670 m2 (18,000 sq ft).

== Novo Naselje ==
Novo Naselje (Cyrillic: Ново Насеље; Serbian for new settlement) is the eastern extension of Leštane, located on both the Smederevski put and Kružni put roads. As its name says, it is a new settlement, having been mainly developing since the 1990s, with many small workshops, groceries, and residential houses. It connects, in an urban sense, Leštane with Kaluđerica (and thus with Belgrade), Vinča and Boleč. In the 2000s, Leštane began expanding to the west, opposite Novo Naselje, in the direction of Bubanj Potok.

== Sources ==
- Jovan Đ. Marković (1990): Enciklopedijski geografski leksikon Jugoslavije; Svjetlost-Sarajevo; ISBN 86-01-02651-6
