= Ritopek =

Ritopek Ритопек
- Suburban settlement
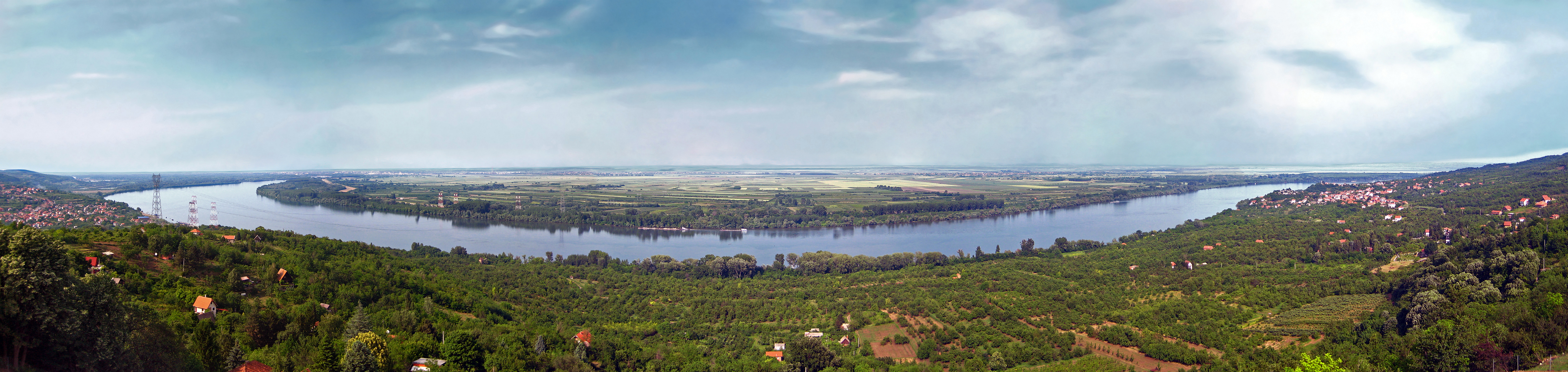
- A panorama of the Danube at Ritopek

- Location within Serbia
- Country: Serbia
- First evidence of settlement: ~500 BC

Population (2011)
  - Total: 2,613
- Time zone: UTC+1 (CET)
  - Summer (DST): UTC+2 (CEST)
- Serbian postal code: 11353; 11307
- Area code: 11

Ritopek (Serbian Cyrillic: Ритопек, pronounced [ri:topek]) is a suburban settlement of Belgrade, Serbia. It is located in the municipality of Grocka, 20 km east of Belgrade and 19 km west of the municipal seat, on the right bank of the Danube, across from the village of Ivanovo in Banat region of the Vojvodina province.

== History ==
Pre-Roman artifacts from the Late Iron Age, have been discovered in Ritopek. The most representative is the Scythian styled pendant from the 5th century BC, a representation of a stylized griffin's head with tentacles. The remains belonging to the Scordisci, a Celtic tribe which founded Singidunum, the predecessor of Belgrade, were also found in Ritopek.

In Roman times, the fortress of Tricornium (Latin for "three-horned fortification") existed at the site of Ritopek. It contained an important military camp Castra Tricornia. The name originated from three distinctive hills dominating the landscape, one of which was later washed away into the Danube river. The settlement gave name to the Romanized Thracio-Celtic tribe of the Tricornenses. A ceremonial breast plate with stylistic illustrations belonging to Legio VII Claudia soldier Aurelius Herculanus and dating from 258 AD has been found, as have many other artifacts of the Roman period such as silver coins that were washed ashore once the dam of the Iron Gate I Hydroelectric Power Station was constructed.

Tricornium was one of the forts built to protect the Via Militaris road. Other known forts include Mutatio ad Sextum Militare, in Grocka, and Mutatio ad Sextum, in Mali Mokri Lug. Well preserved bust of the Roman emperor Macrinus (ruled 217–218) was found in the nearby Boleč.

The elementary school in Ritopek was one of the first schools in Serbia, established in 1838. Together with the school, the villagers built the first church which was completed in 1868 and is dedicated to the Holy Trinity.

Ritopek is frequently damaged by flooding of the Danube (such as in the floods in April 2006 and those of May 2014).

In 2020, beavers were spotted in Ritopek. Number of beavers began to decline in the second half of the 19th century, almost disappearing by the 1870s. Last specimens in the area were spotted in 1900 in Pančevo and in 1902 in Belgrade. Reappearance after 120 years is a result of the successful reintroduction project conducted since 2004 in the Zasavica reserve, 90 km (56 mi) west of Belgrade. Since then, they spread all through the northern and western Serbia, including the Belgrade surroundings (Ritopek, Obrenovac, Krnjača).

== Economy ==
Ritopek's economy is almost entirely based on agriculture, especially intensive fruit growing. Vast orchards surround the village. The villagers live off growing cherries, apricots, and apples, and vineyards were farmed in the past. A summer festival, Dani trešnje (Days of [the] cherry) is held in the village. As the village is stretched almost 5 km along the road, new section on the road of Smederevski put is modern, commercially oriented (gas stations, restaurants, workshops, parking lots, etc.), and connects the built-up area of Ritopek with Boleč and Vinča, thus making Ritopek the easternmost part of the continuous built-up area of Belgrade.

== Population ==
Ritopek is statistically classified as a rural settlement (village). Historical population of Ritopek according to the official censuses:

- 1921 - 1,540
- 1948 - 1,892
- 1953 - 1,980
- 1961 - 1,956
- 1971 - 1,886
- 1981 - 2,002
- 1991 - 2,163 (de jure)
- 1991 - 2,045 (de facto)
- 2002 - 2,349 (de jure)
- 2002 - 2,284 (de facto)
- 2011 - 2,613

== Culture ==
Starting in 2002, artist Dragan Ilić created an artistic complex called ITS-Z1 (International test site). It is located under the uphill Orlovsko Gnezdo ("eagle's nest"). The complex covers 1,800 m^{2} (19,000 sq ft) and consists of five, successively built sections: house with studio and scenic viewpoint; exhibition gallery; three smaller capsules for guest artists; land across the Danube with artistic installations, visible from the viewpoint by the spyglass; a large studio with KUKA KR 210 creativity robot. ITS-31 has been described as "unique and rare experiment in Serbian architecture" and "architecture without architects".

== Notable people ==
- Branislav Lečić, Serbian actor, director and politician.
- Bojana Maljević, Serbian actress.
- Branko Milićević, Serbian actor.
- Petar M. Todorović, Serbian and Yugoslav military officer.
- Sava Aćin, Serbian TV and film set designer.
- Veljko Belivuk, leader of the Principi group.
