= Ribarska Banja =

Ribarska Banja Рибарска Бања
- Village
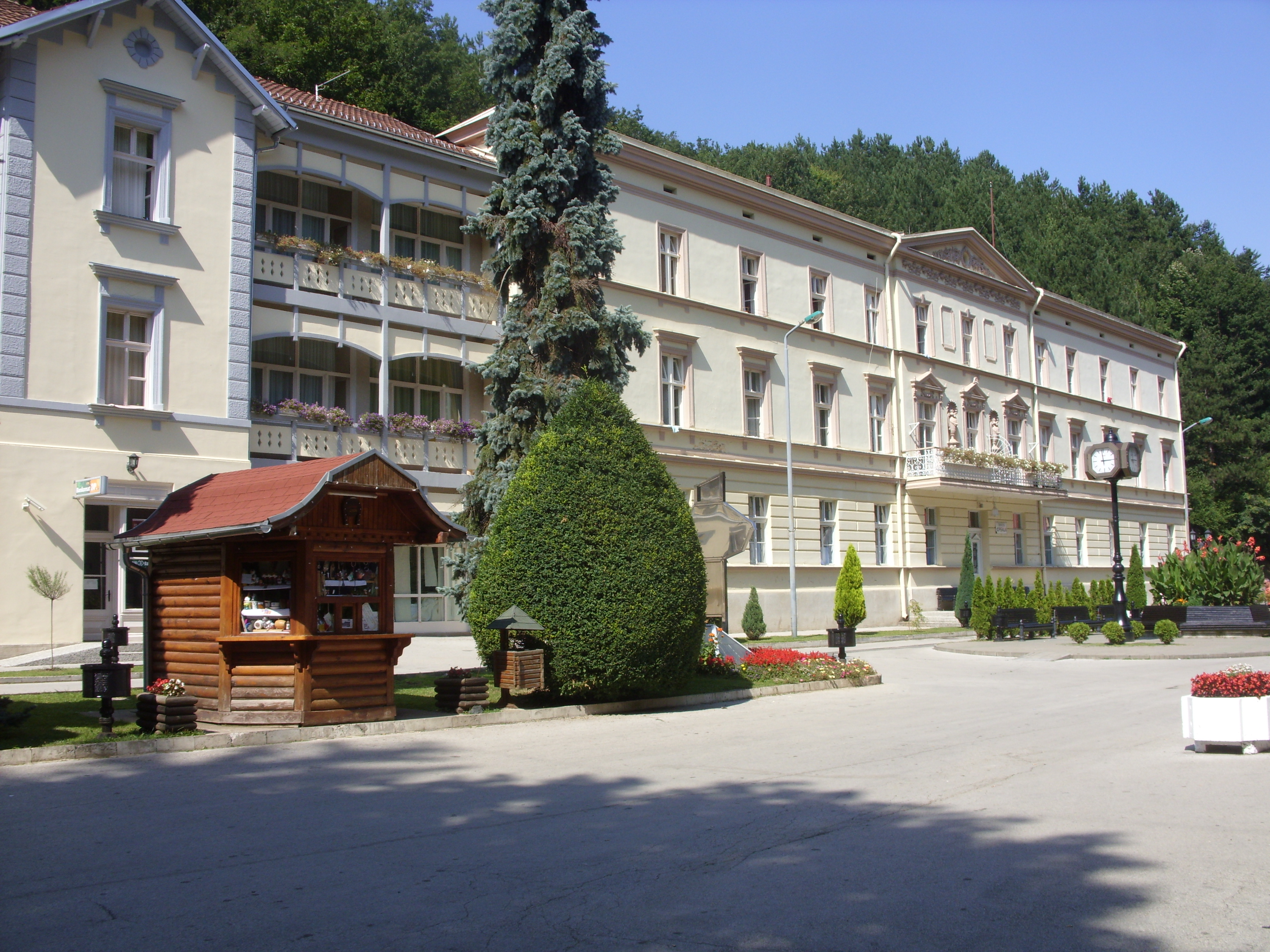
- Ribarska Banja

- Location within Serbia
- Coordinates: 43°25′31″N 21°30′25″E
- Country: Serbia
- District: Rasina District
- Municipality: Kruševac

Area
  - Total: 1.05 km^{2} (0.41 sq mi)

Population (2011)
  - Total: 189
  - Density: 180/km^{2} (466/sq mi)
- Time zone: UTC+1 (CET)
  - Summer (DST): UTC+2 (CEST)

Ribarska Banja (Serbian Cyrillic: Рибарска Бања) is a village and spa located in the municipality of Kruševac, Serbia. As of the 2011 census, it has a population of 189 inhabitants.

== See also ==
- List of spa towns in Serbia
