= Kaluđerica =

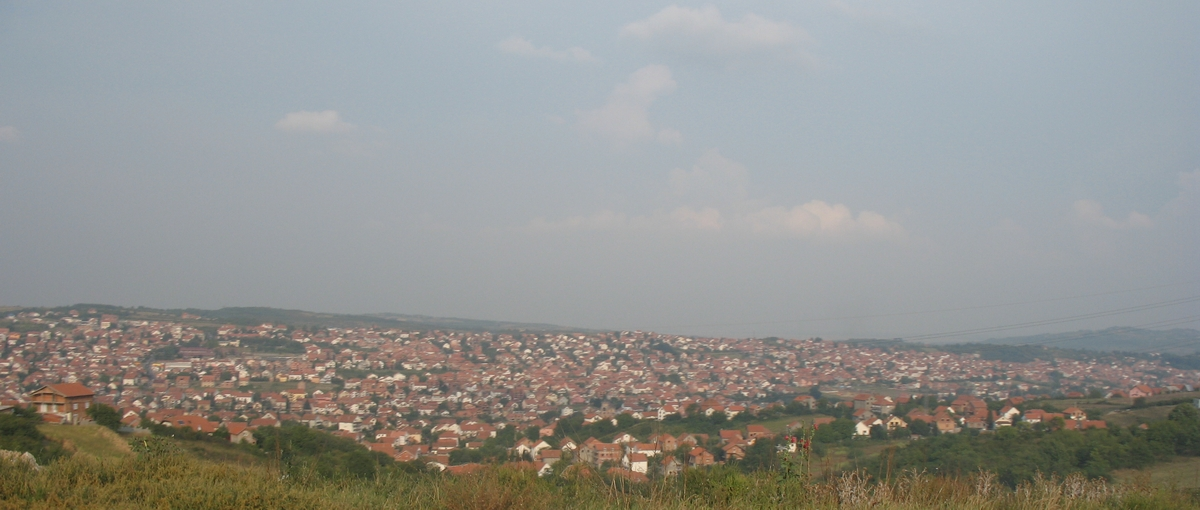

- Location within Serbia
- Coordinates: 44°45′N 20°33′E
- Country: Serbia

Population (2011)
  - Total: 26,904
- Time zone: UTC+1 (CET)
  - Summer (DST): UTC+2 (CEST)

Historical population
Year	Pop.	±%
1921	650	—
1948	934	+43.7%
1953	1,011	+8.2%
1961	1,066	+5.4%
1971	1,909	+79.1%
1981	12,435	+551.4%
1991	17,580	+41.4%
2002	22,248	+26.6%
2011	26,904	+20.9%

Kaluđerica (Serbian Cyrillic: Калуђерица, pronounced [kalud͜ʑěrit͜sa]) is an urban neighborhood of Belgrade, the capital of Serbia. It is located in the municipality of Grocka.

== Location ==
Kaluđerica is the westernmost settlement in the municipality of Grocka. It is located 6 kilometers east of central Belgrade and stretches in two fork-like urban formations between the road of Smederevski put to the north and the Belgrade-Niš highway to the south. The settlement is built in the hollow (micro valley of the Kaluđerički potok creek), with a specific microclimate, so out of all parts of Belgrade Kaluđerica is often the foggiest and the first one to have snow in winter.

== History ==
Kaluđerica originated during the Ottoman rule of Serbia. A group of refugees who fled the Turks, settled at the bottom of the valley between two major roads. They cleared the thick woods around the creek and up to the 1950s, the settlement was predominantly agrarian, with most of the inhabitants working in agriculture and cattle breeding.

There was a spring of mineral water in the village. It was a spring of warm, sulfur water, up to 25 °C (77 °F). The spring was recorded in the 1892 papers published by the state government.

== Name ==
Nearby Bubanj Potok was the location of a monastery which owned land in the present Kaluđerica, so the name was derived from the word kaluđer which means a monk (kaluđerica - a monk's place), though in modern Serbian, word kaluđerica means a nun. Monastery was demolished in fire after the World War II.

== Characteristics ==
As the significant part of the settlement is built without permits and plans, none of the communal problems are even remotely solved. Kaluđerica is notorious for its lack of sewage, which during strong rains spills over in the streets, and smells during the summer.

Situation is not better with the waterworks and electricity (which are, by the largest number, illegally conducted from the public lines) or transportation (short and bending streets, with only one straight street in the settlement, and only one daily bus line of the public transportation, 309). Kaluđerica probably has some of the worst conditions of any other neighborhoods in the City of Belgrade territory, excluding the informal settlements. With a total lack of control in the settlements expansion, in few cases it even happened that people would build houses in the middle of the street, disconnecting it.

Kaluđerica, in urban sense, grew with Belgrade’s most eastern part Mali Mokri Lug on the north, along the Smederevski put, and Veliki Mokri Lug to the south, divided from Kaluđerica (that is, from Kaluđerica's section of Klenak) by the highway.

Architects and urbanists describe Kaluđerica as an “undefined conglomerate of residential objects built against the law” or as an “example of deurbanisation which went beyond hope”.

== Population ==
For several decades Kaluđerica was among the fastest growing settlements in Serbia. According to the latest census of the population, Kaluđerica had a population of 26,904 in 2011. It is three times more populous than its municipal seat, Grocka (population of 8,441 in 2011). However, most of the houses are built without the necessary building permits, so population is presumably much higher, especially after the wars in former Yugoslavia and the influx of the refugees from Bosnia and Hercegovina, Croatia and Kosovo and Metohija (journalists often nickname Kaluđerica the largest illegal settlement in Europe). Belgrade's City Public Transportation Company (GSP), Telekom Srbija and police, based on the number of people using their services, estimate the population between 45,000 and 50,000.

== Neighborhoods ==
As Kaluđerica rapidly developed, several distinct sub-neighborhoods within the settlement were formed. Those to the north, along the Smederevski put, are mostly named after the kafanas which had been the only features on the road before the settlement expanded.

- Čardak; easternmost extension of Kaluđerica, which extends from the neighborhood Tri Tiganja to the west and continues into the settlement of Leštane to the east and Radmilovac, across the road. Along and above the Smederevski put, it was named after kafana of the same name (Turkish: çardak, meaning "summerhouse").
- Klenak; western extension. It is the highest part of the settlement, on the hill above, with a beautiful view on the rest of Kaluđerica. Klenak extends from Stara Kaluđerica, settlements old core to the east and stretches along the highway, with its western part in Zvezdara municipality, as the extension of Mali Mokri Lug. A bridge over the highway connects Klenak and Mali Mokri Lug with Veliki Mokri Lug, which expanded on the other side of the highway.
- Moravac; north-west extension, the closest part to Belgrade. Northern sections of the neighborhood, along the Smederevski put, are administratively part of the municipality of Zvezdara. It extends into the neighborhood of Mali Mokri Lug to the west, Novo Naselje to the east and Stara Kaluđerica to the south. Named after kafana of the same name (meaning "man from Morava").
- Novo Naselje; as the name suggests ("new settlement") is a new, rapidly developing and mostly commercial zone along the Smederevski put. It is located between the neighborhoods of Moravac (to the west), Tri Tiganja (to the east) and Stara Kaluđerica (to the south).
- Stara Kaluđerica (old Kaluđerica), the oldest core of the settlement, further to the south from the main road. Mostly located along the Vojvode Stepe Stepanovića street.
- Tri Tiganja; north-central section. It is an area where road which leads to the Belgrade city dump and the Nuclear Institute "Vinča" separates from the Smederevski put. There is a developing commercial zone along the road and the crossroads. It was named after kafana of the same name (meaning "three frying pans").
- Donja Kaluđerica; largest part of Kaluđerica. It has two elementary schools, IDEA and Maxi shops, modern community health center, kindergarten and police station.

== Notable people ==
Folk singers Mira Škorić and Sandra Afrika grew up in Kaluđerica.

== Sources ==
- Jovan Đ. Marković (1990): Enciklopedijski geografski leksikon Jugoslavije; Svjetlost-Sarajevo; ISBN 86-01-02651-6
