= Đorđe Jovanović (writer) =

Serbian writer, poet and literary critic (1909-1943)

Đorđe Jovanović Ђорђе Јовановић
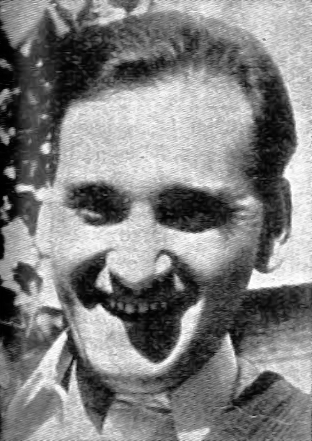
- Born: 27 October 1909; Belgrade, Kingdom of Serbia
- Died: 23 July 1943 (aged 33); Slatina, German occupied Serbia
- Other names: Đoka, Jarac
- Occupations: Poet; literary critic; novelist
- Writing career
- Pen name: Đorđe Daničić; Danilo Dragić
- Period: Interwar period
- Movements: Surrealism; New realism

Đorđe Jovanović (Serbian Cyrillic: Ђорђе Јовановић; 27 October 1909 – 23 July 1943) was a Serbian writer and literary critic, and a surrealist poet, active in Yugoslavia during the interwar period. Along with his two high school classmates, Oskar Davičo and Đorđe Kostić, he represented the younger generation of the Yugoslav surrealist movement. Jovanović was often referred to by his childhood nickname and later nom de guerre Jarac (lit. billy goat).

In the late 1920s and early 1930s, Jovanović helped shape Belgrade surrealism through small-circulation magazines and group publications, and he became a central participant in its internal debates about the group's aims and politics. He served as editor-in-chief of the review Nadrealizam danas i ovde (NDIO; 1931–1932), and contributed to the group's programmatic statements as it moved from avant-garde experimentation toward more explicit Marxist commitments.

After leaving poetry, Jovanović devoted himself mainly to polemical and programmatic criticism. Following imprisonment for communist activity in the mid-1930s, he emerged as a prominent Popular Front-era critic associated with "new realism", a local variant of socialist realism, writing essays and literary-historical interpretations that recast Serbian literature through Marxist and sociological approaches. His critical method in this period was shaped especially by György Lukács and Louis Aragon, and later commentators have sometimes dubbed him a "Marxist Skerlić", for his Marxist reinterpretation of Serbian literary history in dialogue with Jovan Skerlić's critical project.

During World War II he joined the Yugoslav Partisans and served as political commissar of the Kosmaj Partisan Detachment. Between periods of field service he lived illegally in occupied Belgrade, writing for the underground paper Glas Narodnooslobodilačkog fronta Srbije. In his 1943 article "Štuka kultura" (Stuka culture), Jovanović denounced occupation-era cultural life as propagandistic collaboration. He was killed near Kosmaj on 23 July 1943, and a novel and several collections of his essays were published posthumously.

== Early life ==
Đorđe Jovanović was born on 27 October 1909 in Belgrade. He was the son of Jovan ("Kalča") Jovanović and Danica ("Danka") Jovanović. His father was a colonel connected with the Salonika Trial. Jovanović's father Kalča left the family, and Jovanović was raised by his mother and aunt. He became very close to his aunt Draga ("Nuna") Stanišić, and sometimes referred to her as his "second mother".

Through his paternal grandmother, Jovanović descended from the Nenadović family, a 19th-century political dynasty. His uncle Buki Jovanović was a conspirator in the 1903 May Coup.

Jovanović became friends with his classmate and future co-author Đorđe Kostić around 1920, when they discussed the expulsion of a mutual classmate for spreading communist literature during Filip Filipović's mayoral campaign. The two initially bonded over their shared admiration for Miroslav Krleža and August Cesarec. They first became captivated by poetry after reading the poem Stražilovo by Miloš Crnjanski.

== Pre-surrealist activities ==
Along with another classmate, Oskar Davičo, Kostić and Jovanović would go on to represent the younger generation of the Yugoslav surrealist movement. Before joining the core of the local movement in 1930, the group would publish several literary magazines during their high school years. The group's first foray into publishing was the single-issue magazine Okna (Panes), published in 1925 and edited by Jovanović. Okna featured the first published prose of Oskar Davičo. Its first issue published François Fénelon's famous admonitory letter to Louis XIV.

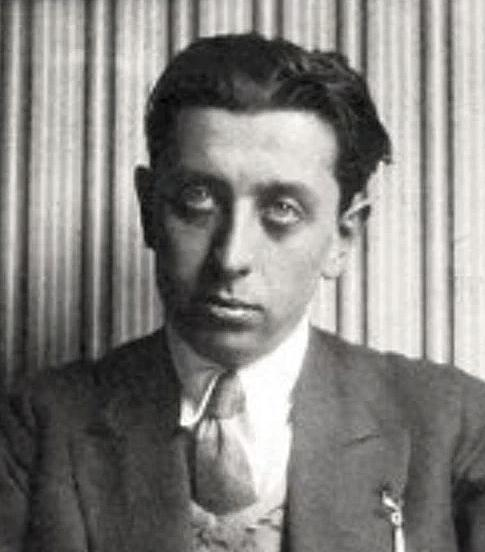
Jovanović's early poetry was inspired by the writings of Robert Desnos.

In 1926, Jovanović and Kostić, alongside Filip Vasić and Božidar Z. Marković, published the magazine Stišavanja (Becalmings). The magazine was inspired by the writings of Robert Desnos, and included a translation of his poetry. It also featured Jovanović's critical essays on Ljubomir Micić, Stanislav Vinaver, Aleksandar Vučo, Rade Drainac and others, as well as an innovative short story by Jovanović titled "A Castle neither in the Sky nor on Earth (Composed According to the Words of the Vagabond Njegovan)". Filip Vasić provided the illustrations for Stišavanja. The title of the magazine was a reference to Kostić and Jovanović's belief that after the cessation of avant-garde magazines Svedočanstva and Putevi, the movement had entered a phase of stagnation.

Around this time, Jovanović was expelled from the First Belgrade Gymnasium for refusing to obey the dress code. Jovanović transferred to the Fourth Belgrade Gymnasium in 1925, where he participated in the literary society "Jovan Skerlić". At his new school, Jovanović first met Dušan Matić, one of his teachers at the time. According to Đorđe Kostić, it was during this time that Jovanović struggled with alcoholism, started abusing ether and developed a personal ethic of vitality (Serbian: životnost), eschewing nonconformism and adopting a hedonistic attitude. Because of all this, the two drifted apart for a short while. They reconnected in the autumn of 1927, when Jovanović introduced his former classmate to Matić. Soon after, Jovanović enrolled at the University of Belgrade to study philosophy. In 1928, Jovanović introduced Matić to Oskar Davičo, who took an instant liking to him after discussing their shared disdain for mainstream poets like Jovan Dučić and Milan Rakić, as well as the literary critic Bogdan Popović.

Between 1928 and 1929, Jovanović and Kostić, together with Davičo, published three issues of the literary magazine Tragovi (Traces). The magazine was intentionally limited to an exceptionally small circulation, namely only eight copies of each issue were printed. The readers were mostly known in advance and belonged to the surrealist group, to whom Tragovi would serve as a short anthology presenting the styles of the three collaborators. The trio would go on to produce three issues of the magazine in which they implemented elements of surrealist automatism. Jovanović's poems were less inspired by surrealism, and displayed an attitude of anarchic individualism and revolt. While working on Tragovi, Jovanović spoke admiringly of Jules Bonnot and regarded every excess as a symbol of the liberation of the human personality from the constraints imposed upon it. In his op-ed "Marginalije" (Marginalia) in Letopis Matice Srpske, Marko Ristić praised the magazine for its innovation and aesthetic appeal. However, he also critiqued the group for somewhat rigidly adhering to the principle of "art for art's sake," cautioning that this approach could lead to potential misunderstandings, especially with poems lacking contextual explanation. Jovanović was dissatisfied with his critique, which he expressed to Ristić in a disheartened letter.

== Surrealism ==
=== Formation and Četiri strane ===
Following the publication of the final issue of Tragovi, Jovanović, Kostić and Davičo wanted to expand their circle. They envisioned launching a new series of Tragovi which would include their teacher Dušan Matić, and potentially Aleksandar Vučo and Milan Dedinac. Their plans took shape when Jovanović first met Marko Ristić at the theater, where he discussed the idea with Ristić and Matić. Matić suggested extending the invitation to Ristić, citing his prior collaboration with Vučo, Dedinac and himself on Svedočanstva. His students agreed and the nucleus of the surrealist group convened for the first time in the summer of 1929.

On 30 November 1929, the group convened for their second meeting at Aleksandar Vučo's apartment. Organized by Vučo and Ristić, this gathering brought together members from both the Tragovi and Svedočanstva circles, as well as contributors from the magazine 50 u Evropi (50 in Europe) and the literary critic Velibor Gligorić. During the meeting, tensions escalated between Jovanović and Gligorić, leading to a confrontation that resulted in Jovanović, with the assistance of Oskar Davičo, forcibly removing Gligorić from the premises due to his status as an employee of the state. Following the meeting, Jovanović reached out to Dušan Matić in December with the idea of establishing a new magazine. The attendees of the November meeting responded to a formal questionnaire over joining the new surrealist group in January 1930.

In early 1930, Jovanović, Kostić and Davičo published their final independent project as a trio, the single-issue placard magazine Četiri strane – Onanizam smrti – I tako dalje (Four pages – onanism of death – and so on). Literary theorist Biljana Andonovska argues that the publication challenges conventional forms of reading and print, emphasizing its experimental typographic design and its combination of features associated with the brochure, book and magazine. Marko Ristić welcomed its publication in his op-ed in Politika.

=== Nemoguće ===
In May 1930, the first surrealist almanac the group authored was published under the title Nemoguće (The impossible). The publication opened with the surrealists' answers to the earlier questionnaire compiled by Marko Ristić and titled "Čeljust dijalektike" (The jaw of the dialectic), and closed with a short history of the group titled "Uzgred budi rečeno" (By the way) and written by Ristić and Matić.

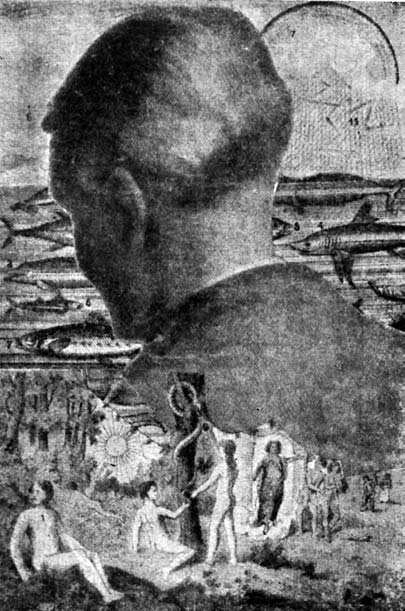
Jovanović's self-portrait from Nemoguće-L'Impossible, 1930

At the time, Jovanović was drawn to individualist anarchism. In "Čeljust dijalektike", he was the sole member of the group to proclaim his embrace of the existence of evil, arguing that good could not exist without it, in the spirit of Comte de Lautréamont. Jovanović sardonically described his participation in the group as a betrayal of his individualism. On the question of his relation to French surrealism, Jovanović opined that he accepted the essence of Breton's first Manifesto, as well as Louis Aragon's Preface to a Modern Mythology from Le Paysan de Paris. He identified Bitka oko zida by Dušan Matić and Bez mere by Marko Ristić as important influences from Belgrade surrealism, while advocating work parallel to French surrealism rather than its imitation. Jovanović considered both French and Belgrade surrealism to be influential sources in the realization of his "integral revolt".

In "Čeljust dijalektike", the younger Tragovi group tended to favor shorter, ironic and subversive answers. The trio distinguished themselves from the rest of the group proclaiming their disbelief in miracles. However, divisions arose between them on the questions of "mythologization" and "constant suicide", both of which they had already discussed during the production of Četiri strane – Onanizam smrti – I tako dalje. The questionnaire "Čeljust dijalektike" contained a question on each of the two topics. In his response to the question of "mythologization", Jovanović sharply criticized the position of Kostić and Davičo, dismissing their suicidal ideation as childish, labeling it "one-sided psychological mythologism" and declaring the two "onanists of death". Consequently, a disagreement emerged between Ristić and Jovanović, where Matić tried to mediate between the two by writing an automatic text in which he tried to explore common ground between them. According to Kostić, regarding "mythologization", Jovanović alone treated the elevation of one's personality into myth as a justifiable reaction to mortality and viewed it as the ultimate imposition of oneself on their environment. Another question in "Čeljust dijalektike", concerned with "constant suicide" and framed through Jacques Rigaut, featured a sharp split within the Tragovi group. Kostić and Davičo answered in terms close to the rhetoric of suicide and death associated with the group's earlier text Onanizam smrti, while Jovanović flatly rejected their position. In a separate essay in Nemoguće titled "Disanje ili nema revolucija" (Breathing, or the mute revolution), Jovanović treats the act of living and breathing as a mute but constant revolution and a possible source of hope for inner liberation.

In October, the surrealist group got into several physical confrontations with Rade Drainac after the publishing of his openly disdainful and derogatory article on the group in the magazine Pravda. According to Drainac, he was beaten by the entire group. However, according to Đorđe Kostić, Drainac got into a short scuffle with Jovanović and himself, during which Jovanović grabbed Drainac by the coat and Kostić blocked his arm when he swung at them with a walking stick. Kostić claimed that Radojica Živanović Noe beat Drainac only later that night in a one-on-one fight near Hotel Moskva. Several members of the group signed an announcement outlining a similar story in late October.

Soon after the publication of Nemoguće, Jovanović left poetry and devoted himself to literary criticism. He would meet daily at Hotel Moskva with Kostić, Davičo and Noe. They were often joined by two girls, Šana Lukić and Vera Matić, as well as Dušan Matić.

=== Self-critique ===
During the summer and fall of 1930, Jovanović often met with Kostić, Davičo and Noe at Aleksandar Vučo's vineyard in Topčidersko Brdo. Disappointed with Marko Ristić who had recently started writing for the magazine Vreme and inspired by the worsening effects of the Great Depression, Davičo, Jovanović and Kostić proposed the writing of a new declaration to Dušan Matić. The declaration, titled "Pozicija nadrealizma" (The position of surrealism), was signed on 23 December 1930 by eleven of the thirteen signatories of Nemoguće, including Jovanović. It was more explicitly Marxist than their previous publications and advocated for a violent revolt. The declaration was published in January 1931 and was swiftly banned. It would later appear in the third issue of Breton's Le Surrealisme au service de la revolution.

In June 1931, the group launched the publication Nadrealizam danas i ovde (Surrealism here and now; often styled NDIO). The review listed all eleven signatories of Pozicija nadrealizma as editors, with Jovanović serving as editor-in-chief. It would continue until June 1932, publishing a total of three issues.

The first issue of NDIO was predominantly the initiative of the informal faction forming around Dušan Matić, which included his former students, as well as Koča Popović and Radojica Živanović Noe. This faction advocated for more active political participation, seeking to transcend the contemplative nature of surrealism and align the group more explicitly with the Communist Party of Yugoslavia. Jovanović contributed to the publication with a literary overview titled "Sada i ovde" (Here and now), in which he delivered a scathing critique of Milan Bogdanović, Rastko Petrović, Todor Manojlović, and Charlie Chaplin. His critique of Chaplin was a response to Louis Aragon's 1927 defense of Chaplin, "Hands of Love", which Jovanović argued had lost all meaning after Chaplin's recent ideological evolution and subsequent advocacy for individual acts of charity. In a dialogue in the first issue of NDIO, Jovanović argued that the individual remains singular and preoccupied with its own aspirations, although it draws the conflicts and pressures of life from society and reshapes them into its own recognitions and refusals. Matić associated this position with Max Stirner and Friedrich Nietzsche. For surrealists, Jovanović located the individual's significance in revolt against the immediate environment, expressed through destruction, subversion, or at least provocation of the "here and now", and viewed political action as a means of transforming society so as to make the individual's full realization possible. Đorđe Kostić later characterized this conjunction as Freudo-Marxism.

In contrast to Matić's faction, a separate informal faction grouped around Marko Ristić, advocating for the surrealist group's evolution into a surrealist movement which would remain a fellow traveller of the Communist Party without fully aligning with it. The faction would come to include Aleksandar Vučo, Milan Dedinac and Vane Bor. However, during the group's work on NDIO, Jovanović and Bor briefly formed a separate alignment, for which they tried to win over Davičo as well. Matić's faction opposed publishing these debates openly and advocated for the surrealist group to remain a group. Jovanović and Bor, as well as Ristić, considered the group's evolution into a movement necessary. However, unlike Ristić, they saw this movement as part of a broader movement based on the principles of historical materialism.

Trying to find common ground with the socialist realist publication Stožer, Jovanović and Bor contributed to the second issue of NDIO from January 1932 with an article titled "Nadrealizam danas, uvod u jednu generalnu analizu nadrealizma" (Surrealism today: an introduction to a general analysis of surrealism), in which they argued that surrealism must be interpreted on the basis of dialectical materialism. Criticizing the first Surrealist Manifesto, as well as Ristić's Bez mere, they sought to correct the idealist elements of earlier surrealism. They rejected the "miracle" but retained the established surrealist category of "the marvellous", which they argued did not conflict with the dialectical principle of causality, and defended Breton's notion of the "occultation" of surrealism as a question of surrealist politics. They held that surrealism, understood as a movement, was compatible with historical materialism and could enrich it. They especially emphasized "critical activity", drawing on Aragon's earlier classification of surrealist activity into critical activity, surrealist experimentation, and manifestation. Their article drew a scathing response from Marko Ristić, while Aleksandar Vučo attempted to formulate a compromise in the same issue, tacitly supporting Ristić's position.

In the second issue of NDIO, Jovanović also contributed with a poem, participated in the experiment with simulation via surrealist automatism, as well as in the questionnaire on humor, where he posited that the utilization of humor might be moral or amoral solely based on intent. Literary critic Dubravka Đurić characterizes "Pokušaji simulacije" (Attempts at simulation), a multidisciplinary theoretical and literary text by Noe, Bor, Jovanović, and Vučo, as an early post-avant-garde and postmodernist work that uses text to simulate particular states, identities, desires, and powers of the subject, including bourgeois optimism, superstition, and a special kind of imagination, and to set the reality of uncertainty in motion through phantasm, association, and imagination. In the overview column "Sada i ovde", Jovanović wrote a sarcastic critique of Jovan Dučić who he presents as an aging reactionary and a leftover of outdated Belle Époque French literature. In the third and final issue of NDIO in June 1932, Jovanović contributed with his prose poem "Snebapaurebra" (lit. Outoftheblue) and again in the column "Sada i ovde", where he decisively broke with individualism and pessimism, proclaiming the group's position as a "collective revolutionary optimism". In the same essay, Jovanović critiqued the group's former collaborator Tin Ujević for his "passive Christian meditation" and lauded Miroslav Krleža. The publication of NDIO ceased after this issue following an ultimatum by the Communist Party of Yugoslavia which the "Aragonist" faction had recently joined, a move spearheaded by Matić, Davičo and Kostić and supported by Jovanović and Koča Popović.

Soon after the final issue of NDIO, the surrealist group was arrested en masse on several occasions during 1932, starting with Oskar Davičo's arrest in Bihać.

== Arrest and departure from surrealism ==
Dissatisfied with the inactivity of the mainline Communist Party of Yugoslavia, Jovanović came into contact with expelled former party leader Sima Marković. Along with a group of young communists, Jovanović concluded that the party, unlike Marković at the time, was incapable of either helping them reproduce leaflets or connecting them with workers. Marković's group was ultimately arrested in late 1932. The group's arrest came as a result of their printing of a leaflet advocating against the hanging of the national flag on Unification Day, 1 December, and for a communist revolution. In the leaflet, the flag was described as a "symbol of slavery of all Yugoslav peoples". Jovanović was arrested during the night between 30 November and 1 December 1932 along with Sima Marković and fellow surrealist Koča Popović. Their arrest preceded the sentencing of Oskar Davičo to five years of prison by several days.

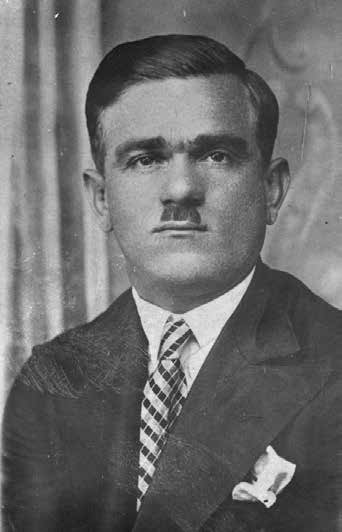
In prison, Jovanović joined the leftist faction led by Petko Miletić.

Already in the first half of 1933, still in pre-trial detention, Marković's group turned against him and came under the wing of Petko Miletić. Their split with Marković came as a result of his perceived petit bourgeois manners and habits, and revealed a divergence between younger party members and his more moderate approach. After a five-day trial, on 17 June 1933 Jovanović was sentenced to three years of rigorous imprisonment by the National Court for the Protection of the State, set up during the 6 January Dictatorship. Đorđe served most of his sentence at the Sremska Mitrovica Prison. His co-conspirators from Marković's former group received lesser prison sentences and Koča Popović was acquitted.

In June 1934, Đorđe Jovanović was part of a group of communist prisoners transferred to the Lepoglava prison. Shortly upon arrival, Jovanović, along with Petko Miletić, Milovan Đilas and another communist, was sentenced to two weeks of solitary confinement after protesting the abuse of two mentally ill inmates by the prison guards. At Lepoglava, Jovanović was cellmates with Đilas and Žarko Zrenjanin, both members of the "leftist" faction centered around Miletić, as well as Đuro Pucar, a member of the opposing faction.

During his time in prison, Jovanović drifted from surrealism, later making the transition to socialist realism or "social literature". He expanded on this evolution in a letter addressed to Marko Ristić on 27 July 1935, in which he criticized André Breton, as well as Ristić's recent essays in Danas. Jovanović claimed that, amid the rise of fascism in Europe, surrealism amounted to "one form of the disorientation of aestheticizing or grumbling petty-bourgeois intellectuals" whose concerns were alien to the proletariat. However, he said that he felt no shame in having participated in surrealism, as it led him away from potentially becoming a fascist himself and praised Louis Aragon's novel The Bells of Basel.

On 20 August 1935, a large group of communist inmates in Lepoglava were transferred to other prisons, with the majority being transferred to Sremska Mitrovica. On the day of their transfer, the inmates were brutally beaten by the prison guards at Lepoglava. Jovanović was part of a group which was led into the prison yard after the initial round of violence, where they received a second beating while handcuffed.

== Literary criticism ==
Immediately after his release from prison in early 1936, Jovanović joined in the activities of the Freedom Front, a cultural institution of the Yugoslav Popular Front. He wrote extensively in the following period, publishing literary criticism and polemics in magazines such as Književni savremenik, Savremeni pogledi, Pregled and Naša stvarnost, in accordance with the Popular Front policy of re-evaluating "bourgeois cultural and artistic values". Jovanović contributed to Naša stvarnost (Our reality), a Popular Front literary magazine edited by Aleksandar Vučo, since its inception in September 1936. Some of Jovanović's essays from this period were published under the pseudonym Đorđe Daničić.

=== New realism ===
In May 1936, Jovanović wrote an article on Sigmund Freud. In this article, he distinguishes psychoanalysis as a scientific method from Freud's metapsychology, treating the latter as an ideological, speculative superstructure he terms "Freudianism". Jovanović first encountered Valentin Voloshinov's book Freudianism: A Marxist Critique through the radical publisher Lazar Vukičević. Literary critic Radojica Tautović reads this separation of the "revolutionary" psychologist from the politically backward philosopher as an application of Jovanović's dialectical account of "bourgeois decadence", stressing his view that scientific advances are revolutionary in their own domain regardless of their authors' broader commitments.

Literary historian Stanko Lasić situates Jovanović's July 1936 essay "Književnost i novi realizam" (Literature and new realism) among the programmatic texts that marked the mid-1930s rebranding of Yugoslav "social literature" as "new realism", crystallizing around journals such as Književni savremenik. Lasić reads the essay as converging with Marko Ristić's dialectical realist programme, but also as symptomatic of a tendency to make literature serve an already systematized worldview, an orientation he links to the drift of new realism into didacticism and schematism. He adds that, alongside programmatic pieces by Ognjen Prica and Milovan Đilas, it helped define one of the key fronts of the emerging new realism in the second half of 1936, beginning with a polemic against l'art pour l'art and what Jovanović derided as "artistic and literary fiddling".

In 1937, Jovanović joined the newly formed editorial board of Naša stvarnost, which also included Aleksandar Vučo, Radovan Zogović, Dušan Matić, Marko Ristić and Milovan Đilas. According to historian James M. Robertson, Zogović, Đilas and Jovanović belonged to a cohort of young communists whose literary theories were decisively shaped by György Lukács. Literary critic Eli Finci, however, sees Jovanović's conception of realism as shaped by the evident influence of Louis Aragon, and argues that Jovanović tended to treat "realism" as the core criterion of artistic value, thereby underplaying questions of form, method and style. Literary historian Predrag Palavestra casts Jovanović's critical essays as largely doctrinaire interventions shaped by Communist Party expectations and the criteria of Soviet socialist realism, arguing that his polemics were often instrumental and sometimes unjust as he tried to prove political reliability after being branded a factionalist in 1937.

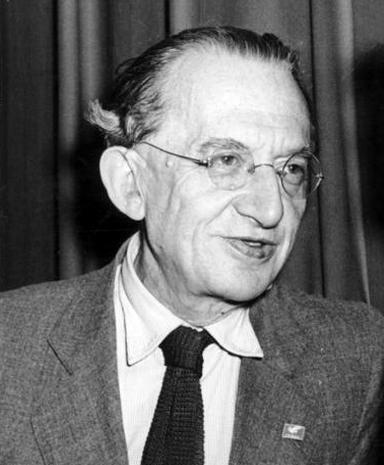
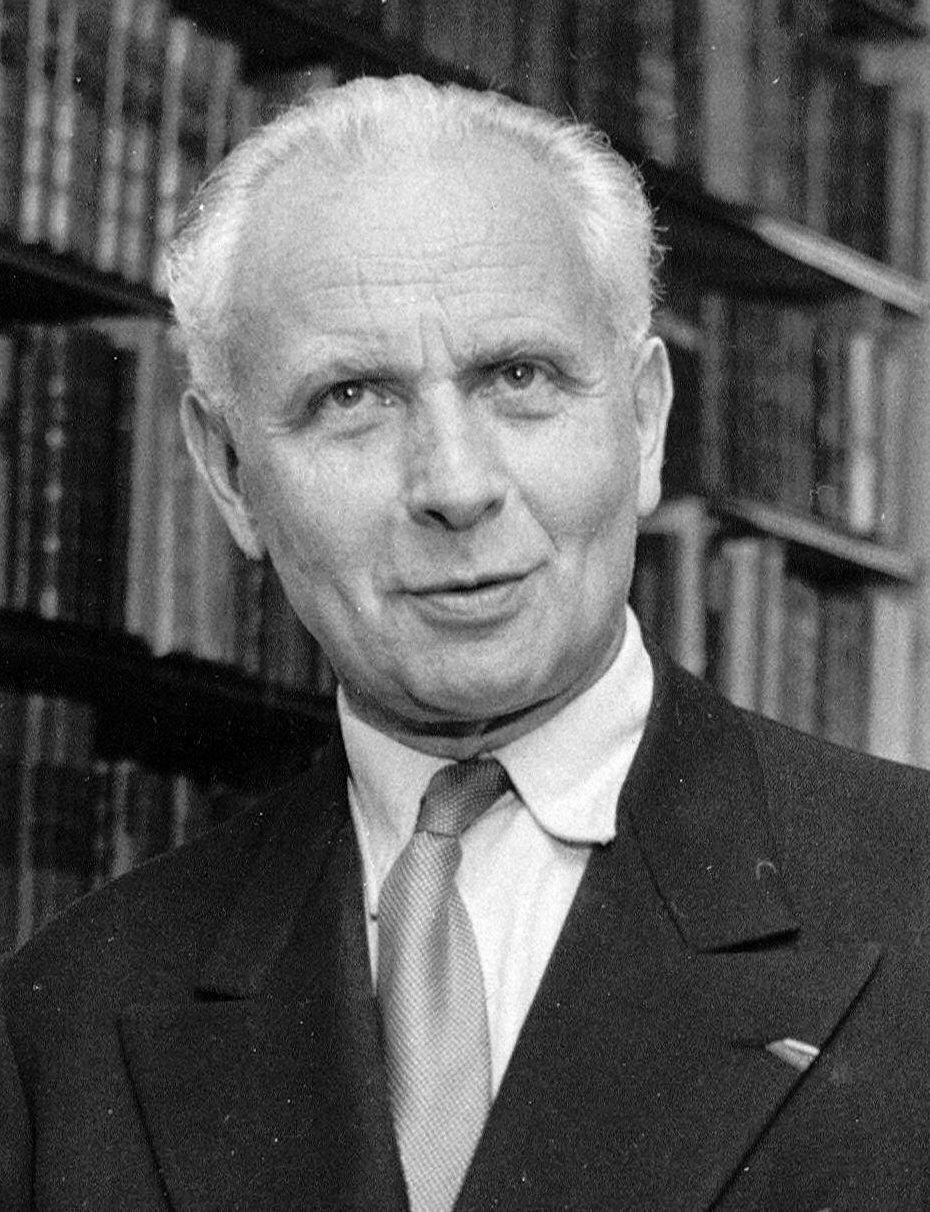
Jovanović's Popular Front-era new realism drew primarily from György Lukács and Louis Aragon.

During 1937, Jovanović served as secretary of Belgrade's semi-illegal Cultural and Educational Committee within the communist underground, around which he gathered a small party cell that included painter Đorđe Andrejević Kun, writer Jovan Popović, sculptor Vladeta Piperski, and painter Mirko Kujačić. Outside clandestine work, he spent time with friends in the "Red Danube Flotilla", an informal rowing circle from the Dorćol riverside whose members included Vladimir Živančević, the Baruh brothers (Isa, Bora, and Joži), Duško Simović, Jovan Popović and Dida de Majo, most of whom did not survive World War II.

Responding to Safet Krupić's essay on André Gide published in the magazine ARS 37, Jovanović published a polemical review in the February 1938 edition of Naša stvarnost, portraying Gide as a glorifier of immorality, reaction, and anti-humanism. The piece was printed in Naša stvarnost under the title "Tri obmane dekadentne poezije" (Three deceptions of decadent poetry) and later reprinted as a booklet in 1940. Literary critic Miroslav Egerić notes that it was written in the immediate wake of Gide's Soviet travel books (Retour de l’URSS and its sequel) and reflects the shock and disappointment these texts produced in parts of the Yugoslav left. According to Egerić, like many left-wing intellectuals at the time, Jovanović considered Gide's accounts of the USSR politically significant because they could weaken its standing as a moral reference point and undermine working-class cohesion. In his essay, Jovanović portrayed Gide as a preacher of escape, immoralism and motiveless action. Jovanović criticized Gide's advocacy for revolution in the abstract paired with his dismissal of both revolutionary discipline and Soviet reality, which Gide considered plagued with conformism, as "anti-conformism for anti-conformism's sake". He attacked "Gideism" as an especially refined form of "decadent individualism". Egerić judges Jovanović's essay as marked by a pamphleteering tone and a piling up of invective, casting Gide as a symptom of a "crisis of conscience" within the "decadent European intelligentsia", and argues that the resulting portrait is one-sided, revealing more about Jovanović's Popular Front criteria and "combative optimism" than about Gide's literary thought, which would have required a more delicate and flexible measure, especially in light of later, better-documented knowledge of the Soviet context at issue. Tautović, however, argued that Jovanović treated Gide as exemplary of the internal contradictions of "bourgeois decadence", reading "decadent fermentations" in his work as simultaneously signs of deformation within the ruling class and attempts to resist that deformation, and therefore separating a moral-political condemnation of Gide from a more differentiated literary assessment of his writing.

In November 1938, Jovanović published his most mature formulation of his theory of realism in his text "Realizam kao umetnička istina" (Realism as artistic truth), drawing on Lukács' 1935 essay "Friedrich Engels als Literaturtheoretiker und Literaturkritiker" (Friedrich Engels as literary theorist and literary critic). In his analysis of the text, Egerić argues that Jovanović's account of realism was an eclectic synthesis, drawn in part from Lukács and Aragon and in part formulated independently, centered on what he calls the "hypostatization of the epistemic function of art", treating art as a reflection of objective reality. Expanding on Finci, Egerić further argues that, in a move he compares to Aragon's post-surrealist writings, Jovanović tended to blur the distinction between the "real" and the "realistic", stretching "realism" so broadly that it risks becoming a near-synonym for artistic value. By contrast, in critical engagement with both Finci and literary critic and aesthetician Zoran Gavrilović, Tautović attempts to reconstruct Jovanović's critical method under the name "modern realism". He argues that Jovanović defines realism as vitality (Serbian: životnost) or "life-elan", at the same time explicitly rejecting a Bergsonian or mystical sense of vitalism. Tautović reads Jovanović as using "realism" both as the essence of art and as a particular artistic method or style. He interprets this distinction through the dialectic of essence and appearance, arguing that the underlying realism of art could manifest even in works that were not realist in form. Tautović emphasizes that Jovanović's conception of "new realism" envisioned a transcendence of the realism of Maxim Gorky. He also cites Jovanović's favorable assessment of Bertolt Brecht's Threepenny Novel as an example of his openness to other literary methods. Tautović further argues that Jovanović conceptualizes "decadence" dialectically, as an "alloy" of art and anti-art that may still preserve progressive elements. He aligns this position more closely with Georgi Plekhanov than with Lukács.

In his polemical reviews of his contemporaries, Jovanović consistently applied his realist method, arguing the reading public's interest in "reality" rather than "nightmarish experience" or "subjective deformation". Accordingly, he tended to dismiss modernist stylization, mysticism, and psychological inwardness as ideological distortions. Applying this criterion across both prose and poetry, Egerić argues Jovanović was at times sharply reductive toward writers he saw as falsifying social truth, such as in his attack on Ivo Andrić's "apparent realism", while remaining demanding even toward left-leaning authors such as Čedomir Minderović and Milka Žicina when he judged their work to lapse into schematic pathos or "covert naturalism". Palavestra treats Jovanović's 1936 essay on Andrić as a characteristic party-aligned polemic, arguing that Jovanović rejected Andrić's prose as an untruthful picture of Bosnia on primarily ideological grounds.

In April 1939, amid the emerging controversy around the magazine Pečat, Jovanović intervened in Naša stvarnost with an article on Louis Aragon, portraying Aragon’s break with surrealism and turn to realism and revolutionary struggle as the condition of "true humanism", and implicitly targeting the surrealist legacy resurfacing at the time around Pečat. Finci cites this Aragon study as an exception to Jovanović's frequent tendency to make "realism" the decisive criterion of value, since here he foregrounds questions of method by distinguishing the "new realism" of his epoch, grounded in a "dialectics of narration", from the older realist tradition's "mechanics of description" and "chronicler's style". Egerić argues that Jovanović's Aragon study adopts a tone of near-unqualified affirmation, shaped not only by his perception of realist elements in Aragon's work but also by the congruence of their political commitments, and that it does so at the cost of minimizing Aragon's earlier development and questions of subjectivity, freedom, and the "integral" character of literary expression.

=== Od Dositeja do Disa ===
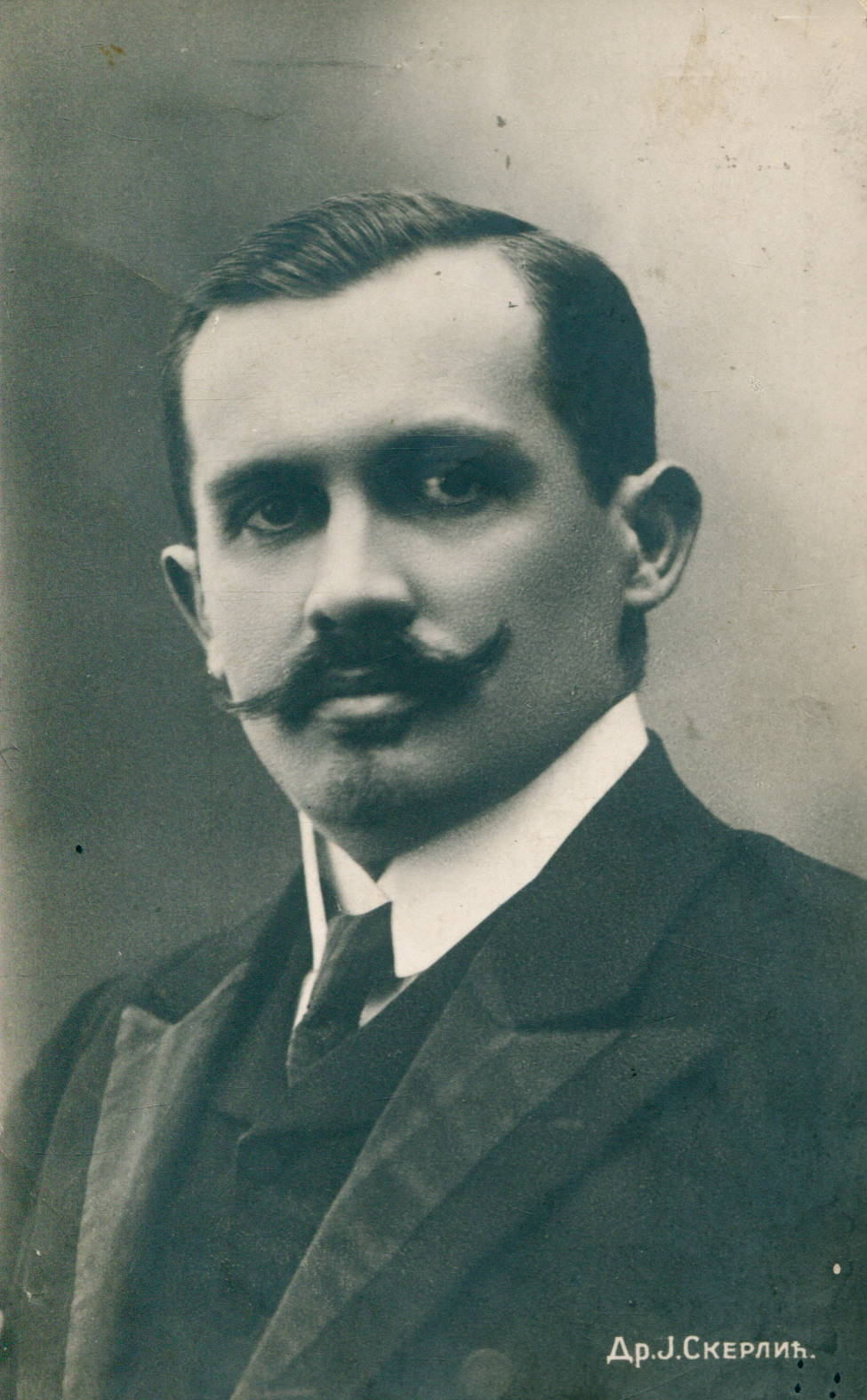
Later critics have dubbed Jovanović a "Marxist Skerlić" for his Marxist reading of Serbian literary history.

Between 1938 and 1940, Jovanović published a series of essays on Serbian literature, intended for a collection titled Od Dositeja do Disa (From Dositej to Dis). The series discussed Dositej Obradović, Prota Mateja Nenadović, Svetolik Ranković, Radoje Domanović, Branislav Nušić, Jovan Skerlić, Laza Lazarević, and Vladislav Petković Dis, and appeared in periodicals including Umetnost i kritika, Srpski književni glasnik, Letopis Matice srpske, Pregled, and Život i rad. Many of these essays revisited established assessments of Serbian writers through Marxist and sociological approaches, which Gavrilović characterized as "sociological-psychological" within Serbian literary studies. Egerić finds Jovanović's essay on Dositej largely dependent on Skerlić's Istorija nove srpske književnosti, especially its treatment of Dositej's Enlightenment rationalism, humanism, and democratic cultural mission. He places Jovanović's essay on Prota Mateja Nenadović's Memoirs among his finest work, praising its vivid style and its recognition of the literary importance of a work Skerlić had largely overlooked. Jovanović stressed the memoir's epic realism and the spirit of popular revolt and freedom. Egerić credits Jovanović with tracing Ranković's pessimism to the social conditions of late nineteenth-century Serbia and interpreting it as grief over suffering and frustrated hopes. He praises Jovanović's portrayal of Domanović as a democratic satirist opposed to autocratic rule, though he finds that its forceful judgments leave little room for detailed literary analysis.

Egerić regards Jovanović's 1939 essay "Skerlićeve istine i zablude" (Skerlić's truths and delusions) as his clearest effort to continue Jovan Skerlić's critical project. Jovanović explored Skerlić's writings through the social and political conflicts of his time, treating his critical achievements and limitations as historically shaped. He praised Skerlić's insistence on connecting literature with social life and giving criticism a public role, while tracing his political "delusions" to the limits of reformist liberalism and moral declarations that could "thunder" without effect. Egerić argues that Jovanović resisted reducing Skerlić's literary achievement to a party affiliation or political label. Palavestra argues that Jovanović portrays Skerlić primarily as an Independent Radical and a liberal public figure, classifying him according to his political and class affiliations while neglecting the full complexity of his literary-critical work. This continuation of Skerlić's critical project helps explain why Zoran Gavrilović, writing in 1957, described Jovanović as a "Marxist Skerlić".

In his article on Laza Lazarević, Jovanović builds on Skerlić's assessment, reexamining Lazarević by situating his fiction in the historical decline of patriarchal society and qualifying Skerlić's charge of conservative moralism. Egerić argues that Jovanović recognized the difference between the writer's convictions and the criticism of social conditions in Sve će to narod pozlatiti, but did not pursue it through the rest of his fiction. Jovanović traced Nušić's development from the relatively mild political satire of his early works, through his portrayals of petty-bourgeois society after 1903, to the bitter denunciation of hypocrisy and self-interest in Pokojnik. Egerić praises the historical and sociological precision of this account, but notes that Jovanović paid little attention to the nuances of Nušić's humour and its psychological foundations. In a 1940 essay on Dis, Jovanović revisited Skerlić's sharp dismissal of the poet, situating Dis's despair and escapism in the social and political climate of pre-Balkan Wars Serbia and the pressures of early capitalism. He resisted both mystical readings of Dis and efforts to cast him as a revolutionary poet, and criticized elements of nationalist kitsch in Mi čekamo cara. Egerić credits him with illuminating Dis's historical circumstances but argues that he missed much of the poetry's dream imagery, musicality, and imaginative originality. Palavestra argues that Jovanović's interpretation of Dis was governed by political expectations, treating the poet's despair and "anarchic individualism" as an inadequate response to his historical circumstances and his fate as a warning to younger poets against following the same path.

== Final years and death ==
=== Kosmaj Detachment and retreat ===
In April 1941, Đorđe Jovanović was mobilized as a soldier of the Royal Yugoslav Army and was captured during the April War. He quickly escaped from a German transit camp and returned to Belgrade. Under the occupation he lived illegally and in hiding, as he was known to the police from before the war, spending much of this period sheltered by Ljubiša Jocić and his family. Shortly before leaving to join the Yugoslav Partisans, he narrowly evaded arrest by Special Police agents by escaping during an escort, and soon afterwards left Belgrade, entrusting Daroslava Vijorović with the manuscript of his unfinished novel Plati pa nosi (Pay, then carry) and drafts of his three essay collections.

On 17 August 1941, Jovanović traveled from Belgrade to Kosmaj to join the Partisans. Soon, he took on his childhood nickname "Jarac" (lit. billy goat) as a nom de guerre. Assigned as an assistant machine-gunner in Pavle Ilić's company, Jovanović took part in early actions such as burning municipal archives, sabotaging communications, and disarming gendarmerie posts, while also speaking at village meetings where his culture, knowledge of national history, and humor quickly earned him local authority. Through late summer and autumn 1941, the Kosmaj Partisan Detachment, which had been formed in early July 1941 as one of the first detachments in Serbia, fought repeated engagements with German forces and collaborationist units in Kosmaj villages, carried out attacks on gendarmerie stations, including an unsuccessful assault on Sopot in late August, and organized sabotage actions, especially repeated diversions on the Belgrade–Niš railway and raids on railway installations. It also fought major clashes near Sopot in October, including at Venčane and Arnajevo, attacked trains on the Ralja area lines, and conducted operations in lower Posavina, fighting at Veliki Borak, Baćevac, and near Barajevo before returning to Kosmaj after running short of ammunition.

In mid-October 1941, during a reorganization of the detachment as German and collaborationist forces intensified their offensive against Partisan-held territory in western and central Serbia during Operation Užice, Jovanović, by then political commissar of the 2nd Company, was appointed political commissar of the Kosmaj detachment, with Draža Marković as the Party delegate. After running short of ammunition, the detachment returned to Kosmaj and dispatched its 4th Company toward Rudnik to obtain supplies. Jovanović went to the Rudnik area to secure ammunition, obtaining a limited quantity from reserves in Gornji Milanovac, and then traveled to liberated Užice to seek further supplies and discuss the detachment's reorganization. During this mission he was caught in the 21 November 1941 explosion in the underground arms works in Užice and was briefly knocked unconscious.

As the Partisans retreated from the shrinking free territory, Jovanović rejoined the detachment and, as political commissar, took part in organizing its withdrawal under frequent combat as units moved toward the Sandžak and Nova Varoš area. In early December, as the 1st Proletarian Brigade was formed at Rudo, the detachment continued its march in severe winter conditions, with Jovanović ill and exhausted but remaining with the leading elements of the column. After the fall of Gornji Milanovac he opposed proposals to disperse back to local terrain and supported implementing the directive to withdraw into the Sandžak.

Together with the 2nd Belgrade Battalion, the 1st Battalion of the 1st Šumadija Detachment, and the Ljubić Company, the detachment withdrew toward the Sandžak via Jelova gora, Kremna, and Zlatibor, reaching Radoinja on 6 December 1941, where it was reduced to about 120 fighters in two companies and armed with 10 light machine guns and one mortar. After a short rest near Radoinja it was reorganized in late December as the Kosmaj Battalion, with Jovanović retained as commissar, and was then sent to positions near Nova Varoš, where it saw further fighting before moving back toward central Serbia. During his stay in the Sandžak, Jovanović met with the writer and his longtime collaborator Jovan Popović in Nova Varoš.

In January 1942 the Kosmaj unit began its attempt to return from the Sandžak to central Serbia. After crossing the Uvac near Rudo on 7 January it came under heavy attack by Chetnik and SDK forces and fought its way forward through nearly continuous clashes, including engagements while trying to cross the Užice–Višegrad road and fighting around Šljivovica, Kadinjača and Jelova gora area in mid-January. The unit moved via Seča Reka and Povlen, linked up with the Kolubara Battalion, and reached Vujinovača on 18 January, where it entered the Valjevo grouping and was assigned for operations in the wider Šumadija region with an intended base around Kosmaj, Bukulja, and Venčac.

The unit did not immediately return to Kosmaj, but remained in the Valjevo area, deploying toward Sušica and Leskovice and later Debelo Brdo. On 20 and 22 January it repelled attacks by Chetnik and Serbian State Guard forces at Sušica and pursued them toward Valjevo, despite dozens of frostbitten fighters, and it then fought further engagements from positions between Povlen and Jablanik before returning to Leskovice. At a late January conference of the partisan command, Jovanović participated as commissar when it was decided to abandon the remaining free territory and shift from positional defense to dispersed guerrilla operations. Continuing as commissar through further reorganizations in February, he was present at the 14 February consultation on Veliki Maljen and remained in the detachment as it pushed back toward Šumadija. Operating between strong enemy garrisons and major rail lines, the unit fought its way through the Trudelj and Živkovci area, carrying out a series of further clashes while attempting to cross the Aranđelovac–Lazarevac road. In February 1942, the unit clashed with German and collaborationist forces at Drlupa and near Beljina, where it inflicted heavy losses and captured arms and ammunition, including around 4,000 rounds.

In late February, the detachment was encircled and defeated near Venčane and Tulež while attempting to operate again on Kosmaj, facing substantially larger German and collaborationist forces. During the breakout attempt, Jovanović moved between positions under fire, directing groups of fighters, and afterwards led one of the small groups that tried to regroup at Stojnik. The regrouping largely failed, and some survivors, including Jovanović, reached Belgrade and reported the detachment's fate to the provincial Party leadership, while the remaining remnants were destroyed in early March.

=== Underground work in Belgrade ===
After the Kosmaj detachment was temporarily disbanded in late February 1942, Jovanović returned to occupied Belgrade on party assignment and remained there until spring 1943, living illegally and moving between safe houses provided by friends and relatives, including Jocić, Vijorović and Đorđe's uncle, Buki Jovanović. Still ill and suffering from frostbite, he received clandestine medical treatment and had frostbitten tissue removed from his feet.

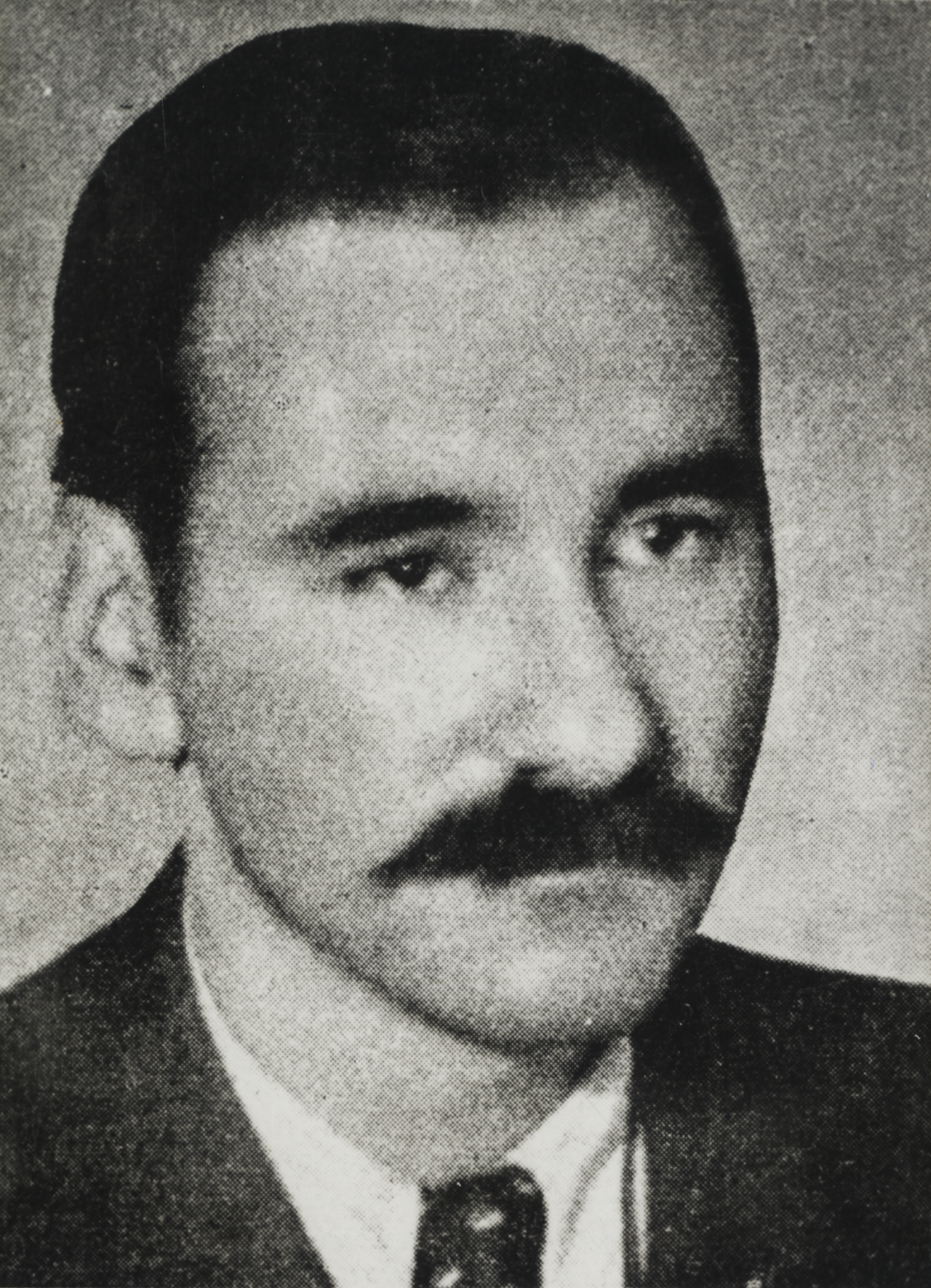
Đorđe Jovanović "Jarac" around 1940.

In Belgrade he reestablished contact with the Provincial Committee for Serbia, filed a report on the detachment's destruction and began writing for the underground paper Glas Narodnooslobodilačkog fronta Srbije under the pseudonym Danilo Dragić. In two known contributions, "Dva lica izdaje naroda" (Two faces of a betrayal of the people) in November 1942 and "Štuka kultura" (Stuka culture) in February 1943, he attacked collaborationist politics and occupation-era propaganda, and criticized cultural figures and institutions that, in his view, accommodated the occupiers by revising or suppressing elements of Serbian cultural and literary history, including through selective treatment of major canonical authors such as Dositej and Radoje Domanović, and the cultivation of officially acceptable substitutes, such as Milovan Vidaković and Čedomilj Mijatović. His article also criticized writers and other cultural workers linked to institutions such as the Serbian Literary Guild and the Kolarac Endowment who, during the occupation, cooperated with the collaborationist cultural apparatus. In its original version "Štuka kultura" explicitly named figures such as Dušan Matić and Aleksandar Vučo, but later postwar republications were subject to party editing, with their names omitted.

During his illegal stay in Belgrade, Jovanović completed the final revisions of Plati pa nosi, a work he described as a sotie but which was commonly treated by later critics as a novel. Published posthumously in 1948 with editorial interventions by Jovan Popović, the book is set in the United States and features a fantastical body-exchange operation. The industrialist John Bradley purchases the healthy body of Morton Laurens, a bank clerk facing severe punishment for embezzlement, and the resulting legal and media spectacle becomes a vehicle for a broader satire of commodification, private property, and moral rationalization under capitalism. Jovanović's inspiration came from contemporary reports of Soviet experiments on artificially sustaining severed animal heads by Sergei Chechulin and Sergei Brukhonenko. According to Popović, Jovanović at one point jokingly claimed to him that Thomas Mann had "stolen his idea", alluding to Mann's 1940 novella The Transposed Heads, though Popović emphasized that Jovanović developed the shared motif in a distinctively satirical and socio-political direction. Dedicated to H. G. Wells, the book was described in later editorial commentary as drawing on the Anglophone satirical and picaresque tradition, invoking Jonathan Swift, Daniel Defoe, and especially Henry Fielding, through episodic plotting and direct authorial address, and as using this inherited "fantastic" machinery polemically against what the editor characterized as Wells's bourgeois outlook.

Although the Main Staff for Serbia ordered him on 8 August 1942 to report as political commissar to the Jastrebac Detachment, Jovanović remained in Belgrade until his return to the Kosmaj area by late March 1943.

=== Return to Kosmaj and death ===
In spring 1943, preparations began to reestablish a separate Kosmaj Partisan Detachment on its home terrain, with Jovanović designated as political commissar in the planned command staff. The detachment was formally reconstituted on 6 May 1943 in the Makovica woods near Kovačevac, with representatives of the Main Staff for Serbia present. At the formation ceremony, Jovanović addressed the assembled fighters and local villagers.

In the first weeks after its reconstitution, Jovanović and deputy commander Milosav Vlajić issued operational orders that prioritized sabotage of rail infrastructure and ambushes against enemy movements. A headquarters report dated 27 May 1943 described a series of early actions by the detachment's companies, including attempted ambushes near the Šepšin-Dražanj and Resnik stations, a road ambush between Vrčin and Rušanj, and a prolonged clash in Vranić during an operation against local collaborationist forces.

In its internal reporting the detachment described morale and discipline as good and noted a gradual influx of new fighters and returning diversionists, alongside continued efforts to improve armament and ammunition stocks. The detachment clashed with German and collaborationist forces at Azanja on 30 May, as well as engaging in acts of sabotage against rail infrastructure, including the destruction of the Radinac station. The detachment's 1st Company fought at Tresije Monastery on 8 June. As the detachment expanded, the 2nd Company operated across the Mladenovac, Podunavlje and Jasenica districts and was soon divided into two companies.

In summer 1943, as commissar, Jovanović also pursued liaison work beyond Kosmaj. In a letter of 9 July 1943 addressed to higher command, he proposed establishing a regular courier link between the units and requested assistance, particularly in manpower, medical support for the wounded, training for nurses, explosives for rail sabotage, and propaganda material. The correspondence also envisaged direct talks, and Jovanović indicated he was prepared to cross into Srem for a meeting with Jovan Popović. Although the proposal was accepted and a rendezvous arranged, the meeting did not take place because Jovanović was killed later that month.

On the evening of 23 July 1943, after the unit had taken up positions in a forest overlooking Manić and Slatina, the company ran into a Chetnik group near the entrance to Slatina. Jovanović was killed in the initial exchange of fire. His body was later displayed in Sopot and then buried in an unknown location.

== Personal life ==
In the late 1920s, Jovanović was at one time romantically attached to the painter Šana Lukić, the sister of Vladeta Lukić ("Glavonja"), a member of his circle. He later became infatuated with Radmila Kupčević, an art history student known by the nickname "Mona Lisa" (Serbian: Đokonda). Đorđe Kostić recalls that Jovanović's early poems in Tragovi were written when he was simultaneously in love with Šana Lukić and an art history student whom he and Oskar Davičo nicknamed "Đokonda".

Around 1931 Jovanović married Katica ("Kaća") Jocić from Skopje, a half-Hungarian woman whose family owned property in close proximity to Jovanović's father. After Jovanović's arrest in 1932, her father ended the relationship. The relationship was also opposed by Jovanović's mother. Kostić recalls that Jovanović described the Skopje marriage as an arrangement initiated by his father and that the couple sought a divorce immediately after the ceremony, adding that Jovanović had a daughter from this brief marriage.

After his release from prison, Jovanović briefly dated Rašela ("Šeka") Almuli, the younger sister of Dida de Majo's wife Ela Almuli, in 1937. In the final years before his death, he was in a relationship with sculptor and Communist Party activist Daroslava Vijorović.

== Legacy ==
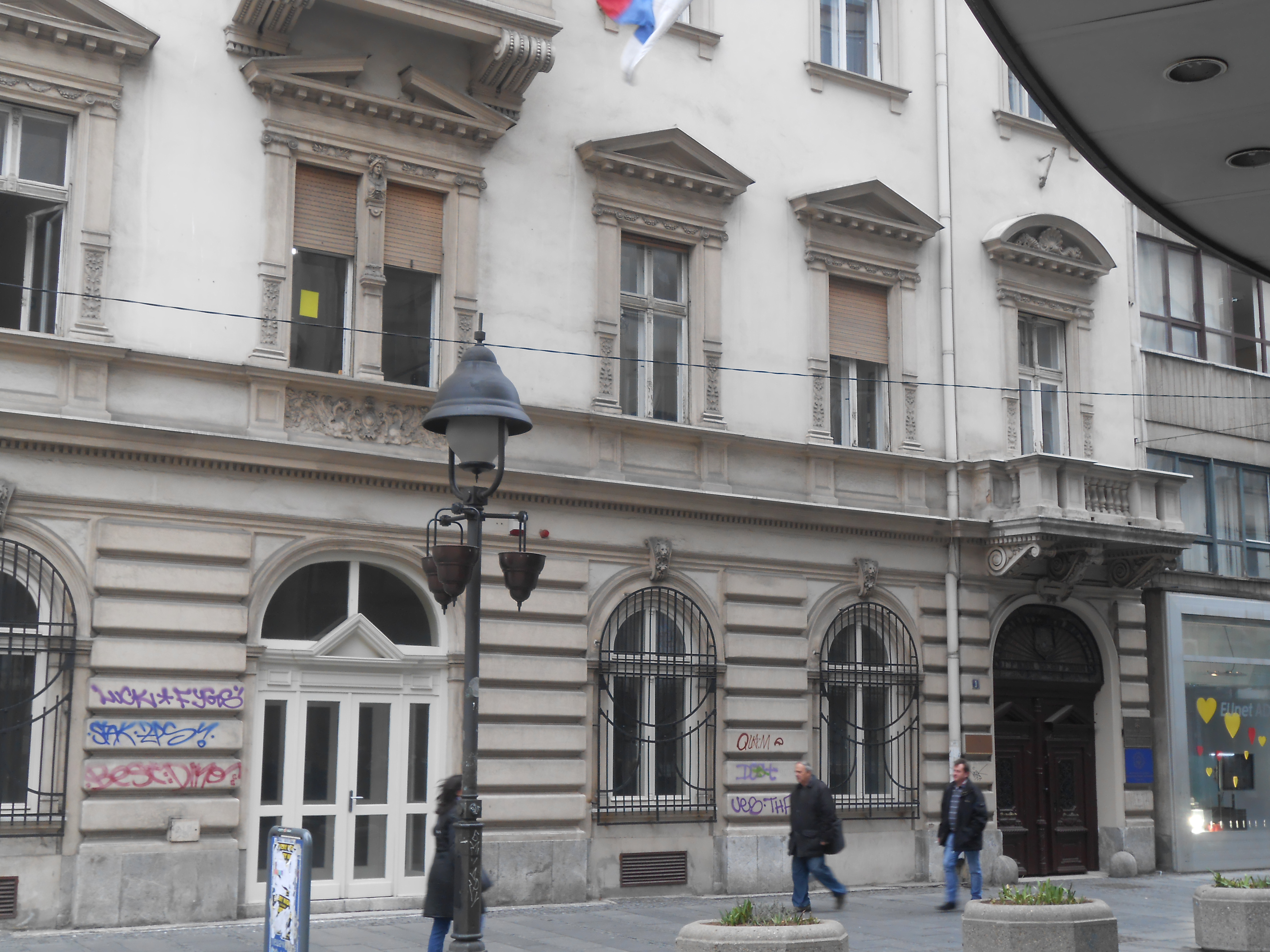
Belgrade City Library "Đorđe Jovanović" (Stari Grad branch), Belgrade

The Stari Grad department of the Belgrade City Library carries the name of Đorđe Jovanović. Starting in 1967, the municipal library awards the annual "Đorđe Jovanović Award" for best critical essay.

Jovanović's novel Plati pa nosi and several collections of his essays were published posthumously.

== Works ==
- (1948) Plati pa nosi (Pay, Then Carry), novel
- (1949) Studije i kritike (Studies and Critiques), essays
- (1951) Protiv obmana (Against Deceptions), essays
- (1979) Snebapaurebra (Outoftheblue), poetry
