= Marko Ristić (surrealist) =

Serbian artist and diplomat (1902–1984)

- Born: 20 June 1902; Belgrade, Kingdom of Serbia
- Died: 20 July 1984 (aged 82); Belgrade, SR Serbia, SFR Yugoslavia
- Occupations: Writer, diplomat
- Writing career
- Period: 20th century
- Genres: Poetry, essay, literary criticism
- Literary movement: Surrealism

Marko Ristić (Serbian Cyrillic: Марко Ристић; 20 June 1902 – 20 July 1984) was a Serbian surrealist poet, writer, publicist and ambassador.

== Early life ==
Marko Ristić was born on 20 June 1902 in Belgrade. He studied in Belgrade, Kruševac and Switzerland before graduating in Philosophy from the University of Belgrade Faculty of Philosophy.

In 1922, he started the literary magazine Putevi (Ways) with Milan Dedinac and Dušan Timotijević. His first literary text Praštanje (Forgiveness) was printed in the second issue. In the summer of 1924, Ristić collaborated with Miloš Crnjanski to publish three new issues of Putevi. The magazine featured Dušan Matić's articles on psychoanalysis, André Breton's proto-Surrealist essays and experimental poetry.

== Interwar period and Surrealism ==
In the early 1920s Dušan Matić was studying in Paris where he monitored Dadaist events. From there, he sent Ristić copies of the magazine Littérature published by Breton.

Ristić started corresponding with Breton in 1923, leading to the publication Breton's first Surrealist Manifesto in Svedočanstva (Testimonies), a new literary magazine Ristić had started in late November 1924 with Dušan Matić, Milan Dedinac, Aleksandar Vučo and Mladen Dimitrijević following his falling out with Putevi. In addition to a translation of the Surrealist Manifesto, the first issue of Svedočanstva included news about the founding of the Bureau of Surrealist Research, published in Belgrade ten days before being officially announced in the publication La Révolution surréaliste.

He visited Paris in 1926-1927 where he spent time with Breton and the Surrealist circle and got to see their works in Breton's flat. After spending several months in Paris, Ristić wrote Bez mere (Without a Measure). Written in Paris and Belgrade and published contemporaneously with Breton's Nadja, Ristić's novel was probably the product of an exchange of influences. However, Ristić dwells more thoroughly on the manifesto-like message of the novel, contemplating the ethics of "Surrealist revolution".

From 1928 to 1929, Ristić published literary criticism in Politika. In early 1930, he was a founder of the Belgrade Surrealist group and edited the Surrealist almanach Nemoguće- L'Impossible. He wrote the declaration Pozicija nadrealizma (The Position of Surrealism) with Dušan Matić, which was signed by eleven local Surrealists (Vane Bor, Aleksandar Vučo, Koča Popović, Milan Dedinac, Radojica Živanović Noe, Oskar Davičo, Đorđe Kostić, Risto Ratković, Mladen Dimitrijević, Đorđe Jovanović, Petar Popović) and was banned.

In the magazine Danas (Today), started by Miroslav Krleža and Milan Bogdanović in 1934, Ristić published several articles, including his essay Moralni i socijalni smisao Poezije (The Moral and Social Meaning of Poetry) where he outlines his view on the revolutionary and moral nature of true poetry. In 1938, he published the confiscated Turpituda, illustrated by Krsto Hegedušić. He started the literary magazine Pečat (Seal) in 1939 with Miroslav Krleža, Krsto Hegedušić, Vaso Bogdanov and Zvonimir Richtmann.

In 1939, Ristić was denounced by Josip Broz Tito as "intimate friend of the Paris Trotskyist and bourgeois degenerate person Breton" and for his goal of wanting to "enrich and complement" Marxism with Surrealism.

== World War II and aftermath ==
From the beginning of World War II, Ristić lived in Vrnjačka Banja. He was arrested by the Special Police in November 1942 and taken to Kruševac. During WWII, Ristić kept a diary which was later the basis for his memoir "at the margin of war", Hacer Tiempo, in 1964.

Immediately after the Belgrade Offensive, Ristić wrote several political articles, the first of which was Smrt fašizmu – sloboda narodu! (Death to fascism, freedom to the people) published on 3 November 1944 in Politika.

== Post-war period ==
In August 1945, Ristić became the Yugoslav ambassador to France, where he served for five and a half years.

After returning to Yugoslavia, Ristić was a major figure in the cultural scene. He participated in the reformed magazine Svedočanstva, as well as the Belgrade-based Delo (Labour). He became president of the Foreign Cultural Relations Commission, and later the Yugoslav National Commission to UNESCO. From April 1962, Ristić was a regular contributor to the Zagreb-based magazine Forum, where he published fragments of his WWII-era diary titled Na rubu rata (At the Margin of War) and the collection of essays Naknadni dnevnik 12C (Late Diary 12C), written in Paris.

== Death ==
Ristić died on 20 July 1984 in Belgrade.

== Works ==
- Od sreće i od sna, 1925. (Of Happiness and of Dream)
- Bez mere, 1928. (Without a Measure)
- Nacrt za jednu fenomenologiju iracionalnog, co-author with Koča Popović, 1931. (Outline for a Phenomenology of the Irrational)
- Pozicija nadrealizma, co-author with Aleksandar Vučo et al, 1931. (The Position of Surrealism)
- Anti-zid, co-author with Vane Bor, 1932. (Anti-Wall)
- Predgovor za nekoliko nenapisanih romana, 1936. (Foreword to Several Unwritten Novels)
- Turpituda, illustrated by Krsto Hegedušić, 1938. (Turpitude)
- Smrt fašizmu sloboda narodu, 1946. (Death to Fascism, Freedom to the People)
- Književna politika, 1952. (Literary Politics)
- Prostor-vreme, 1952. (Space-Time)
- Tri mrtva pjesnika, 1955. (Three Dead Poets)
- Istorija i poezija, 1962. (History and Poetry)
- Nox microcosmica, 1956.
- Ljudi u nevremenu, 1956. (People in Inconvenience)
- Od istog pisca, 1957. (From the Same Author)
- Politička književnost, 1958. (Political Literature)
- Na dnevnom redu, 1961. (On the Agenda)
- Objava poezije, 1964. (The Declaration of Poetry)
- Hacer tiempo, zapisi na marginama rata. Knj. 1 Nemir, 1964. (Hacer Tiempo, Writings at the Margin of War. Book 1 Unrest)
- Prisustva, 1966. (Presences)
- Svedok ili saučesnik, 1970. (A Witness or an Accomplice)
- Za svest, 1977. (For the Consciousness)
- Svedočanstva pod zvezdama, 1981. (Testimonies Under the Stars)
- Knjiga poezije, 1984. (A Book of Poetry)
- Uoči nadrealizma, 1985. (On the Eve of Surrealism)
- 12C, naknadni dnevnik, 1989. (Late Diary 12C)
- Diplomatski spisi, 1996. (Diplomatic Writings)
- Oko nadrealizma 1, 2003. (On Surrealism 1)
- Oko nadrealizma 2, 2007. (On Surrealism 2)

== See also ==
- Vane Bor
- Dušan Matić
- Aleksandar Vučo
- Koča Popović
- Milan Dedinac
- Radojica Živanović Noe
- Oskar Davičo
- Rastko Petrović
- Đorđe Jovanović (writer)
