= Milan Dedinac =

Serbian poet (1902–1966)

Milan Dedinac (Kragujevac, Kingdom of Serbia, 27 September 1902 – Opatija, Yugoslavia, 26 September 1966) was a Serbian poet, the most expressive lyricist among the Surrealists. Similar to Crnjanski, although in a different way, he was a follower of the creator of the Serbian lyric song Branko Radičević. He didn't write much. Almost all of his poetic work is collected in the book Od nemila do nedraga (1957). He also dealt with theatre criticism. He was one of the thirteen who signed the Beogradski nadrealizam (Belgrade Surrealist manifesto) in the Almanac Nemogučeg-L'Impossible in 1930.

== Biography ==
Milan Dedinac was born into a middle–class family in Serbia in 1902. As a high school student, he was evacuated with his older brother Dimitrije (born 1901) and other Serbian children to France after the Great Retreat from Serbia with the army. In 1916 he resumed his high school education in Villefranche and Cannes. After the war, he graduated from the Belgrade Gymnasium and then went back to Paris for a short period. With Marko Ristić and D. Timotijević he edited the journal Putevi (Trails). He published his poetry in the Hypnos magazine.

In 1924 and 1925 he was on the editorial board of Putevi (Trails) and Svedočanstvo (Testimonies) together with his friends, Rastko Petrović, Dušan Matić and Marko Ristić. He also published in 1926 his long poem Javna ptica (The Public Bird) with a series of photomontages. He graduated from the French Language Department of the Faculty of Philosophy at the University of Belgrade in French and comparative literature in 1927. From 1929 to 1930 he worked as a Paris correspondent for Politika. He supported the Surrealist manifesto published in the Almanac Nemoguče-L'Impossible, where his poems Plamen bez smisla (The Meaningless Flame) and Otvoreno pismo (An Open Letter) are published in 1930 and collectively with all the Surrealists a mission statement Pozicija nadrealizma in 1931.

From the next decade (1931–1941) he was employed as an editor and later editor-in-chief of Politika, the Belgrade daily. His book of poems Jedan covek na prozoru (A Man at the Window) was published in 1937. During World War II he was interned in a German POW camp. After the war (1947) he published his book of poetry titled Pesme iz dnevnika zarobljenika broj 60211 (Poems from the Diary of Prisoner No. 60211). The pre-war years became sensitive politically for all the Serbian writers and poets within the Kingdom of Yugoslavia who sought the best for their people but when the old monarchic order got usurped after the war by the Communist partisans, those who were loyal to "God, King and Country" suddenly found themselves enemies of the state.

From 1948 until 1953 he was Artistic Director of the Yugoslav Drama Theater. He was appointed culture attaché in the Yugoslav Embassy from 1953 to 1955, and from 1955 until 1965 he was the Director of the Yugoslav Drama Theater in Belgrade. In 1957 he published the book Od nemila do nedraga (From Pillar to Post).

== Works ==
- Pozorisne chronike (1950)
- Pesme iz Dnevnika Zarobljenika Broj 60211 (1964)
- Od nemila do nedraga (1957)
- Poziv na putovanje (1965)
- Sabrane pesme (1981)
- Noč duža od snova (1972)

Already after the first poems that Dedinac published, the critics pointed out lyricism, immediacy and musicality as its basic features. In his poetic development, he followed the opposite path from that of Crnjanski and other expressionists. The poet Stražilova, starting from very specific historical and erotic themes, strives for lyrical materialization (meaningless) of the subject. Dedinac, on the contrary, starts from fluid emotional states in order to later express quite specific existential and historical situations. His early poetic cycle Zar zora, već? - Zora! (Is It dawn, Yet? - Dawn! 1921-1922) and Zorilo i nočilo (Dawn and Night), 1922, etc. resemble non-figurative painting, in which there are no objects but only lines and colours, or, even more, music, which by its very nature is deprived of any concrete concreteness. The endpoint of that way of singing was reached in the antipoem Javna ptica (1926), considered to be one of the most important surrealist texts. The spontaneous lyricism of the first poems in it is suppressed by conscious searches and experimentation with expression and form.

The turn from the abstract lyricism of early poems to the poetry of reality begins with the poem "One Man at the Window" (1937). The basic situation is symbolic: the poet is at the window, more precisely behind a closed window, and he is watching a storm raging around the city. It is as if he is struggling to separate himself from the closed and safe world in which he lived until then, he turns to the world outside himself, immerses himself in external events, longs for meetings and giving. While in this poem the situation of a man observing a disaster is given, in the folk collection, "Poems from the Diary of a Prisoner No. 60211" (1947), we have the situation of a man in a storm, the drama of a man falling into reality. The collection is a mixture of poetic prose and verse, diary entries and poems. It is poetry about slavery and suffering, about the longing for freedom, the poetry of love for the homeland, one's loved ones and the homeland, created in the best traditions of Serbian libertarian poetry. Dedinac brought his refined lyrical sensibility into it; the lyric is in it in an extraordinary way connected with the material data, with the historical circumstances. There is nothing declarative, parochial, programmatic in his songs; although imbued with the gloomy reality of the era, they remained the purest lyrics.

A completely different orientation is revealed by the poems in the collection Od nemila do nedraga (1957) called "Poetic Essays from Travels in Montenegro". Some of these poems were written before the war, but as a whole, the cycle was shaped in the post-war period, so that they can be taken as the third, final stage in Dedince's poetic development. On poetic travels in Montenegro, poets are not attracted by the destinies of people or the history of the country, but by nature, stone, birds, sun, olives, sky. That poetry is filled with heavenly vistas, sun and light. The poet sees Montenegro as a country open to heaven. Climbing the mountain cliffs ends with immersion in the sky. All songs are permeated with a longing to merge with nature, to disappear into space. In it, man is a participant in the great pantheistic drama of the world and the cosmos. The Montenegrin cycle thus completes Dedince's poetic work. Created in silence and solitude, that work is, after all, based on the best traditions of Serbian poetry, lyrical, libertarian and cosmic, and imbued with the disturbed rhythm of the epoch.

He is one of the people to whom Dobrica Ćosić dedicated a chapter in his novel "Friends".

Milan Dedinac was buried in the Alley of the Greats at the Belgrade New Cemetery.

== Sources ==
- Milan Dedinac, "Collected Poems" in three volumes, Belgrade: publishing house "Filip Višnjić", 1983. p. 145—149.

== See also ==
- Vane Bor
- Dušan Matić
- Aleksandar Vučo
- Koča Popović
- Radojica Živanović Noe
- Oskar Davičo
- Djordje Kostić
- Djordje Jovanović (writer)
- Petar Popović
- Marko Ristić
- Mladen Dimitrijević, nom de plume of Dimitrije Dedinac
