= Dušan Matić =

Serbian poet (1898–1980)

Dušan Matić Душан Матић
- Born: 31 August 1898; Ćuprija, Kingdom of Serbia
- Died: 12 September 1980 (aged 82); Belgrade, SFR Yugoslavia
- Occupation: Writer
- Writing career
- Period: 20th century
- Genres: Poetry, essay, novel
- Literary movement: Surrealism; Socialist realism

Dušan Matić (Serbian Cyrillic: Душан Матић; 31 August 1898 – 12 September 1980) was a Serbian poet who was active as part of the Belgrade surrealist group.

== Biography ==
=== Early life ===
Dušan Matić was born on 31 August 1898 in Ćuprija. His father was a civil servant from Jagodina, and his mother was from Kruševac. Due to his father's occupation, the Matić family moved frequently, spending time in Pirot, Čačak, Niš and Šabac.

Just as he had started attending school in Šabac in 1912, the First Balkan War erupted. His family home was destroyed in the early days of World War I, after which the Matić family moved to Kruševac to stay with the family of Dušan's mother. At the age of 16, Matić published his first poetry in the Serbian Social Democratic Party aligned Radničke novine (The Workers' Journal) under the nom de plume Uroš Jovanović. In 1915, Matić followed his father in the Great Retreat, eventually departing from Durrës. Moving from Messina to Marseille, followed by Grenoble, Matić eventually continued his education in Nice, where he graduated from high school in July 1917.

=== Education ===
In October 1917, Matić enrolled at the Sorbonne in Paris, where he studied philosophy. There, he met and befriended Rastko Petrović, with whom he would attend meetings hosted by French avant-garde writers of the era. In 1919, Matić befriended Miloš Crnjanski, who was in Paris as an exchange student. From 1919 to 1921, Matić attended early psychology lectures by professor Georges Dumas.

Matić was the first of the Belgrade surrealist group to read André Breton's Les Champs magnétiques, which he brought to Belgrade during summer break in 1920. At this time, he collaborated with Ljubomir Micić, who published Matić's essay Bergson o predviđanju i novom (Bergson on Prediction and the New) in the May issue of Zenit (Zenith).

Matić discontinued his studies in March 1921 due to illness. In 1922, he moved from Paris to Belgrade, where he graduated with a degree in philosophy on 6 March 1922. In August 1922, Matić arrived in Dresden where he studied German Romanticist philosophy. During this time, he was critical toward the Belgrade-based avant-garde magazine Putevi (Roads). He elaborated on his criticism in a letter to Marko Ristić, which caused a rift between the two.

=== Surrealism ===
Matić started publishing his poetry in Putevi in October 1923. He also wrote on Freud's psychoanalysis. Matić's most influential essay published in Putevi was Bitka oko zida (A Struggle over the Wall).

After the disestablishment of Putevi in 1924, Marko Ristić started a new magazine titled Svedočanstva (Testimonies). In it, Matić published his essay Ujević detailing the group's view of Tin Ujević, as well as a segment on the creation of madness in the sixth issue and a large portion of the seventh issue titled Pakao (Hell) detailing the inner lives of the mentally ill, the blind, prisoners, sex workers and beggars. During this time, Matić was a substitute teacher at the Belgrade Realschule (Realka).

In 1925, Matić travelled to Paris where he associated with Breton's group Clarté, often visiting Café Cyrano where he signed the group's petition against the Rif War. Between October 1925 and June 1926, Matić left his position at the Realka to work in journalism. In June 1926, he became a substitute teacher at the Fourth Belgrade Gymnasium, where he taught the Serbian and French languages. In 1927, Matić published his essay Buđenje materije (The Awakening of Matter) in Zvezdan Vujadinović's magazine 50 u Evropi.

On 30 November 1929, in the apartment of Aleksandar Vučo, the Belgrade surrealist group was officially formed. Matić co-signed a letter on the formation sent to Politika and published on 14 April. In May, the first surrealist almanac the group authored was published under the name Nemoguće (The Impossible), with an introduction written by Ristić and Matić. Controversially, Matić got into a physical confrontation with Zvezdan Vujadinović in Hotel Moskva in May, while in October the group got into several physical confrontations with Rade Drainac after the publishing of his openly disdainful and derogatory article on the group in the magazine Pravda. According to Drainac, he was beaten by the entire group. However, according to Đorđe Kostić, Drainac got into a short scuffle with Đorđe Jovanović and himself, during which Jovanović grabbed Drainac by the coat and Kostić blocked his arm when he swung at them with a walking stick. Kostić claimed that Radojica Živanović Noe beat Drainac only later that night in a one-on-one fight near Hotel Moskva. Several members of the group signed an announcement outlining a similar story in late October.

In 1931, Matić and Ristić positioned themselves as the main theoreticians of the surrealist movement in Belgrade. They published a declaration titled Pozicija nadrealizma (The Position of Surrealism) in January. The declaration was later banned by the authorities because of the group's socialist sympathies, and was critiqued severely by Matica srpska. After several members left the group because of their disagreements with the declaration, the group published a new review titled Nadrealizam danas i ovde (Surrealism Here and Now) which would continue until June 1932. In late 1932, Matić published the book Položaj nadrealizma u društvenom procesu (The Position of Surrealism in the Social Process) in collaboration with Oskar Davičo and Đorđe Kostić. The book was openly critical of the limits of surrealism and caused a falling out between Ristić and Matić which would continue for several years.

During this period, Matić married Lela Ristić, the daughter of his superior, the principal of the Fourth Belgrade Gymnasium Miodrag Ristić. Lela was 12 years his junior, and her father disapproved of Matić continuing to work at the school following their marriage.

=== Socialist realism ===
In 1932, Matić was under investigation over his ties to Davičo, who was sentenced to 5 years in prison by the National Court for the Defense of the State. In 1934, Matić held two lectures at the People's University of the Academicians' Club, "Psychoanalysis and Freudianism" and "Fascism and Culture". In April 1935, Matić resided in Kragujevac with a group of writers including Aleksandar Vučo, Velibor Gligorić and Radovan Zogović. There, he presented his essay "Contemporary Criticism and Svetozar Marković". That same year, Matić published the poem "Marija Ručara" in collaboration with Aleksandar Vučo, which was later banned. He translated Ivan Pavlov's book on conditional reflexes and co-signed a protest letter with Marko Ristić and Milan Dedinac against Crnjanski's Antologija Ideja (Anthology of Ideje), which they published in NIN.

In April 1935, Matić transferred from the First Realschule to the Fourth Realschule. He was sent into early retirement on 9 May.

In 1936, Matić and Vučo published an excerpt from the novel they were working on, at that time titled Beograd (Belgrade), in the first double issue of Naša stvarnost (Our Reality). Marko Ristić was highly critical of the publication. Matić's friend, the architect Milan Minić, also collaborated on the magazine, designing the visual elements. In sharp contrast to the sentiments of most of his surrealist collaborators, Matić also invited Desanka Maksimović to work on the magazine. Despite Ristić's objections, Koča Popović would collaborate with Matić and Vučo on the next double issue.

In the 9-10 double issue of Naša stvarnost in 1937, dedicated to the defense of culture in Spain, Milan Dedinac published the poem Jedan čovek na prozoru (A Man on the Window), with an introduction by Matić and Koča. In 1938, Matić was one of the leading members of the Association of Scientists, Writers and Artists headed by Branislav Nušić and law professor Đorđe Tasić. Matić held a speech at Nušić's funeral in early 1938 in front of the writers' section. That same year, he was again dismissed from his new position of professor at the newly formed Girls' Gymnasium in Belgrade. He was again sent into early retirement, being found guilty of spreading communist propaganda.

In 1939, Matić translated Émile Zola's novels Germinal and Son Excellence Eugène Rougon. In 1940, Geca Kon published Matić and Vučo's finished novel, now titled Gluho doba (The Deaf Times). Its visual elements were provided by Matić's friend and later architect and owner of Belgrade's Hotel Majestic, Oliver Minić. The novel tried to portray everyday Serbian life during the 1903 May Coup. That same year, Matić and Eli Finci translated Roger Martin du Gard's first novel in his multi-volume The Thibaults, Le cahier gris (The Grey Notebook).

=== World War II ===
Matić fled from Belgrade following the April War to stay with his friends, the Minić family, in Prijepolje. He barely escaped the Ustaše attack on Prijepolje and made it to Belgrade before September 1941. He was arrested in December along with Aleksandar Vučo and interred at the Banjica concentration camp. Matić was released in February 1942, but remained under police surveillance until the 1944 Allied bombing of Belgrade when travel became easier. He left for Užice in April 1944, where he stayed at Zabučje, a nearby hill. He returned to Belgrade in August 1944, and was staying at Oliver Minić's Hotel Majestic during the Belgrade Offensive.

During the war, Matić tried to make contact with the Yugoslav Partisans in 1942, but was intercepted by Chetnik forces en route to the Lipovica forest.

=== Post-war career ===
Soon after the end of the war, Matić started working in Radio Belgrade in 1946. There, he edited the news about new plays, books and exhibitions. During that time, he translated Gustave Flaubert's Sentimental Education. On 1 January 1949, Matić became dean of the newly formed Academy of Performing Arts. There, he taught contemporary literature during the following decade. He mentored young writers such as Vasko Popa and Miodrag Pavlović, who he held in especially high regard. In 1950, he started publishing his essays in Književnost (Literature) and Književne novine (Literary News).

In 1951, Matić became an editor in Književnost and a member of the Council for Culture and Art of the city of Belgrade. In March of the following year, he participated in the publishing of a reformed Svedočanstva with most of his former surrealist collaborators. He was elected president of the Association of Writers of Serbia in 1952, after which he joined the League of Communists of Yugoslavia in late December. His application was supported by Aleksandar Vučo and Roksanda Njeguš. In 1953, Matić traveled to Geneva to attend a meeting of European intellectuals. There, he watched an early staging of Samuel Beckett's Waiting for Godot, which he brought back to Yugoslavia to be translated into Serbo-Croatian. It was staged the following year at Atelje 212, directed by Pavle Ugrinov. Matić attended the meeting in Geneva more than five times during the following years.

In 1956, Matić became co-editor of Književnost alongside Eli Finci, also contributing to Oskar Davičo's newly created modernist periodical Delo (Labor). The following year, he became president of the commission at the first Sterijino pozorje theater festival. That year, he published his collection of essays titled Anina balska haljina (Ana's Ball Gown) for which he received an award from the Association of Writers of Serbia in 1957. Also in 1957, he published his novel Kocka je bačena (The Die is Cast), a sequel of sorts to Gluho doba. Borislav Mihajlović Mihiz was highly critical of Matić's novel, publishing a scathing critique in Politika.

In 1958, Matić became co-editor of Književne novine (Literary News) alongside Čedomir Minderović. The following year, he published his book of poetry Buđenje materije (The Awakening of Matter) for which he was awarded the 7th of July Award. During this time, Matić began assembling a group of young poets who became his protégés. The group included Jovan Hristić and Draško Ređep.

In 1962, Matić published his novel Laža i paralaža noći (The Lie and Paralysis of Night). His book, written largely as a monologue, was adapted into a play and was put on in Atelje 212, directed by Boda Marković. The following year, Matić traveled to Paris where he stayed as a guest of André Malraux, at the time Minister of Cultural Affairs. He visited the Soviet Union that same year.

=== Final years ===
During the following decade, Matić was awarded several honors for his accomplishments. He became a corresponding member of the Serbian Academy of Sciences and Arts (SANU) in 1965, and a full member in 1970. He was awarded the Zmaj Award by Matica srpska in 1966 and the Order of People's Merit by Josip Broz Tito in 1968. In 1967, a documentary about Matić's life was produced by Vladimir Andrić. During this period, a collection of his essays, articles and interviews was published titled Proplanak i um (The Meadow and the Mind) in 1969, as well as a selection of his essays titled Bitka oko zida (A Struggle over the Wall) in 1971, selected by Jovan Hristić.

Matić traveled to Paris in 1975, where he fell ill. His sight was weak during his final years, and he continued to maintain correspondence primarily with Draško Ređep who was residing in Novi Sad. During this time, Bernard Noël published a study on Matić titled Treize cases du je (Thirteen Boxes of the Self) in 1975, while Gérard de Cortanze published a long form interview with Matić in Les Nouvelles littéraires recorded in Paris. In 1976, Matić published his memories about André Breton in Paris titled André Breton oblique (A Skewed André Breton). That same year, BIGZ published a selection of Matić's poems titled Tajni plamen (The Secret Flame), with a foreword by Ređep. Matić's book on Breton was translated and published in Yugoslavia in 1978.

=== Death ===
Matić died on 12 September 1980 at the Clinical Centre of Serbia in Belgrade. His remains were cremated on 15 September at the Belgrade New Cemetery. At his funeral service, speeches were given by Ivan V. Lalić and Peđa Milosavljević representing SANU, and Živorad Kovačević representing the City of Belgrade.

== Legacy ==
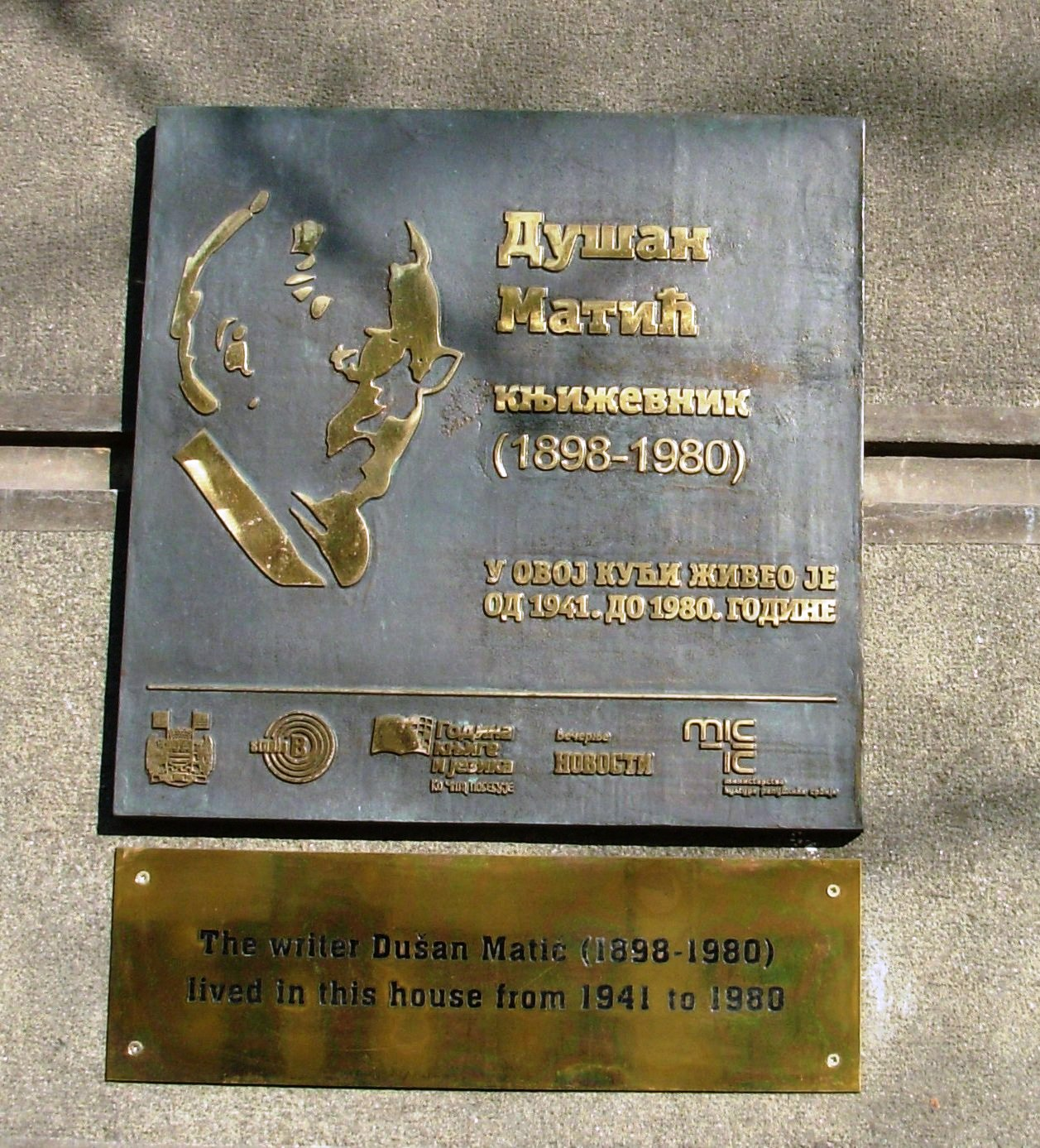
Plaque commemorating Dušan Matić in Belgrade

In 1980, the Belgian musical group TC Matic was named after Dušan Matić.

Starting in 1981, the Dušan Matić National Library in his hometown of Ćuprija organizes the Matić's Days festival in September. The festival presents the annual Matić's Scarf award to young poets and visual artists.

On 13 September 2010, a memorial plaque commemorating the writer was placed on his home in Vojvode Dobrnjca street in Belgrade. The event was attended by Draško Ređep and the president of Ćuprija municipality, Borivoje Kalaba.

== Works ==
- Položaj nadrealizma u društvenom procesu (1932), with Oskar Davičo and Đorđe Kostić
- Gluho doba (1940), with Aleksandar Vučo
- Jedan vid francuske književnosti (1952)
- Bagdala (1954)
- Anina balska haljina (1957)
- Buđenje materije (1959)
- Laža i paralaža noći (1962)
- Proplanak i um (1969)
- Bitka oko zida (1971)
- André Breton oblique (1976)
- Tajni plamen (1976)
- A number of essays, articles on philosophy, critiques and screenplays for radio shows
