= List of Yugoslav poets =

Poets who wrote their poetry in Yugoslavia.

- Ivo Andrić (1892–1975)
- Matej Bor (1913–1993)
- Miloš Crnjanski (1893–1977)
- Oskar Davičo (1909–1989)
- Karel Destovnik (1922–1944)
- Jure Kaštelan (1919–1990)
- Edvard Kocbek (1904–1981)
- Srečko Kosovel (1904–1926)
- Ivan Goran Kovačić (1913–1943)
- Gustav Krklec (1899–1977)
- Miroslav Krleža (1893–1981)
- Desanka Maksimović (1898–1993)
- Slavko Mihalić (1928–2007)
- Milan Milišić (1941–1991)
- Ivan Minatti (1924–2012)
- Vladimir Nazor (1876–1949)
- Vesna Parun (1922–2010)
- Anton Podbevšek (1898–1981)
- Vasko Popa (1922–1991)
- Marko Ristić (1902–1984)
- Antun Branko Šimić (1898–1925)
- Aco Šopov (1923–1982)
- Jože Udovič (1912–1986)
- Aleksandar Vučo (1897–1985)

== See also ==
- Yugoslav literature (disambiguation)
