= Svedočanstva =

The cover of the final issue of Svedočanstva from March 1925.

Svedočanstva (Testimonies) was a Yugoslav literary periodical published every ten days from 21 November 1924 to 1 March 1925. It was the first periodical based in Belgrade espousing surrealistic ideas in literature.

== Formation ==
Svedočanstva continued the trend of the monthly Putevi (Roads, 1922–1924), a modernist periodical. The differences among the various groups contributing to Putevi made it impossible to continue together, and the young and more radical group started Svedočanstva.

== Content ==
The first issue of Svedočanstva was heterogeneous in content and open to experimentation. Among the first few and important contributors were future surrealists Marko Ristić, Milan Dedinac, Dušan Matić, Rastko Petrović, Tin Ujević, Mladen Dimitrijević and Aleksandar Vučo. It contained the first mention of the term "surrealism" in Belgrade, and was published two months after André Breton's Manifeste du surréalisme. The first issue was dedicated to Tin Ujević, Croatian poet and bohemian. The editors announced that Svedočanstva would be a publication for experiments in literature, favoring poetic dream over concrete reality.

The first four issues were mainly dedicated to poetry. A part of the fifth issue indulged in the interpretations of dreams and prophecies, while the sixth issue, with a foreword by Dušan Matić, was dedicated to the confessions of mentally ill people.

The seventh issue was the culmination in the experiments by representing "Hell" by visionary testimonials of deaf and blind persons, criminals, suicidal people and executioners. The last issue took for its theme "Paradise", examining the roots and true meaning of the world, and reducing it to a dream world and lie.

Although Svedočanstva denied it was a surrealists' organ, and although it never published any manifestos by surrealists, and its contributors denied being surrealists, the content of Svedočanstva indicates that it was the first periodical in Belgrade espousing surrealistic ideas in literature.

== Legacy ==
Between the cessation of Svedočanstva and 1930, there was no periodical in Belgrade with a clear surrealistic orientation. Former contributors spread into various other periodicals, such as 50 u Evropi (50 in Europe, 1928), Tragovi (Trails, 1929) and Večnost (Infinity).

In 1930, the Belgrade surrealists came out with their first publication, the almanac Nemoguće (The Impossible). There, they presented themselves as a formal group and outlined their goals and activities. The group mentioned past publications to which its members contributed – Putevi, Svedočanstva and Tragovi, omitting 50 u Evropi since it had assumed a different orientation in 1930.

A second periodical named Svedočanstva was published biweekly in Belgrade during 1952 and was edited by Aleksandar Vučo. Besides literature, the new Svedočanstva dealt with art, science, politics and social issues. Contributors to the magazine included Miroslav Krleža, Ivo Andrić, Josip Vidmar, Milan Bogdanović, Isidora Sekulić, as well as earlier surrealists, Marko Ristić and Dušan Matić. The magazine was an example of the cultural liberalization of 1950's Yugoslavia.
