= Drlupa =

Drlupa may refer to:

- Drlupa (Kraljevo), a village in Kraljevo, Serbia
- Drlupa (Sopot), a village in Sopot, Serbia
