= Nadrealizam danas i ovde =

Serbian surrealist magazine

The cover of the first issue of Nadrealizam danas i ovde from June 1931.

Nadrealizam danas i ovde ('Surrealism Here and Now') was the official magazine of the Serbian surrealists from the 1930s. It was known as NDIO for short.

In 1929 the Serbian surrealists had published the almanac Nemoguće–L'Impossible and largely the same people were involved in the collaborative publication of NDIO. NDIO was a bilingual publication containing written and visual contributions from the Paris surrealist group. There were illustrations by international surrealists including Max Ernst, Yves Tanguy, Joan Miró, Salvador Dalí and Radojica Živanović Noe.

Three issues of the journal appeared, the first in June 1931, followed by the second in January 1932, and the third in June 1932. All three were republished in 2002 by the Museum of Applied Arts, Belgrade to accompany an exhibition entitled The Impossible, 1926–1936 Surrealist Art. The journal followed the trajectory outlined in André Breton's Second manifeste du surréalisme. The prominence of Dalí's work in the second and third issues bear witness to the high esteem in which he was held amongst surrealists in both Belgrade and Paris at this time.

== Contributors ==
- Vane Bor
- Koča Popović
- Dušan Matić
- Radojica Živanović Noe
- Oskar Davičo
