= Pero Popović =

Pero Popović may refer to:

- Pero Popović (painter) (1881–1941), Bosnian Serb artist
- Pero Popović Aga (1905–1930), Yugoslav communist youth

== See also ==
- Petar Popović (disambiguation)
