= Đorđe Kostić =

Serbian writer (1909–1995)

Đorđe Kostić (Serbian Cyrillic: Ђорђе Костић; 1909–1995) was a Serbian writer, poet and linguist. As a young man, Đorđe was part of the Yugoslav Surrealist group. However, later in his life he took up a career in linguistics and was the Research Director of the Institute for Experimental Phonetics for many years.

== Biography ==
=== Early life ===
Đorđe Kostić was born in Ruma in 1909 into a Serbian clerical family. In 1927 he graduated from the University of Belgrade Faculty of Philology and then spent a short period in Paris.

=== Surrealism ===
With Oskar Davičo and Đorđe Jovanović, Kostić published three volumes of the magazine Tragovi (Trails). He joined a group of like-minded friends, Oskar Davičo, Đorđe Jovanović, Aleksandar Vučo, Milan Dedinac, Mladen Dimitrijević, who participated in the Yugoslav Surrealist group led by Marko Ristić. In the early 1930s, he was one of the 13 key artists who signed the manifesto in the Almanac Nemoguće-L'Impossible, where a series of Kostić's drawings and Tri puta san (Three Times a Dream) was published (pages 32, 57, 104), including works of other colleagues.

In 1933, Kostić was arrested for his revolutionary activity and imprisoned for a while. The following year, he decided to leave Belgrade and move to London for several years. There at the Mayfair, he attended the opening of the International Surrealist Exhibition at the New Burlington Galleries from 11 June to 4 July 1936. That year he wrote a monodrama Dan bez noći (Day Without Night).

=== Linguistics ===
In London, Kostić co-authored with Dennis Butler Fry "A Serbo-Croat Phonetic Reader" in 1939.

From 1944 until 1949, Kostić was the Foreign Program Editor at Radio Belgrade. He was appointed Research Director of the Institute for Experimental Phonetics in Belgrade in 1949, a position he held until 1978. While at the institute, Kostić travelled to India doing linguistic research there. He also published numerous papers on comparative linguistics.

=== Final years and death ===
Kostić wrote a book about his recollections on Surrealism titled Do nemogućeg (To the Impossible) in 1972, and with Marko Ristić made a book of pastels and poems "Pass-T-Elle" (Calcutta). Four years later, he published a book U središtu nadrealizma, Čeljust dijalektike (At the Core of Surrealism, the Jaws of Dialectics) about the Surrealist survey from the Almanac Nemoguće-L'Impossible.

He died in Belgrade in 1995.

== Works (partial list) ==
- Operativna gramatika srpskohrvatskog jezika (1987)
- Rečenička melodija u srpskohrvatskom jeziku (1983)
- Linguistic Habilitation for Hearing Impaired (1977)
- A Short Outline of Telugu Phonetics (1977)
- A Short Outline of Bengali Phonetics (1972)
- Do nemogučeg (1972)
- Bengali Speech Sounds for Hearing-Ilmapired Children (1976)
- Under Your Sky (1972)
- Opismenjavanja odraslih (1964)
- Kvantitativni opis strukture srpskog jezika: srpski jezik od XII do XVIII veka - Domentijan
