= Petar Popović =

Petar Popović may refer to:

- Petar Popović (architect) (1873–1945), Serbian architect
- Petar Popović (basketball, born 1959), Croatian former basketball player, father of Marko Popović
- Petar Popović (basketball, born 1979), Serbian professional basketball player
- Petar Popović (basketball, born 1996), Montenegrin professional basketball player
- Petar Popović (chess player) (born 1959), Serbian chess Grandmaster
- Pecija (Petar Popović, 1826–1875), Serbian rebel leader from Bosanska Krajina
- Petar Popović (poet) (1904–1995), Serbian poet and Surrealist

== See also ==
- Pero Popović
