= Drlupa (Kraljevo) =

Drlupa Дрлупа (Serbian)
- Village (Selo)
- Location within Serbia
- Coordinates: 43°48′N 20°49′E
- Country: Serbia
- District: Raška District
- Municipality: Kraljevo

Population (2002)
  - Total: 143
- Time zone: UTC+1 (CET)
  - Summer (DST): UTC+2 (CEST)

Drlupa is a village in the municipality of Kraljevo, western-central Serbia. According to the 2002 census, the village has a population of 143 people.
