= Slatina (Sopot) =

Slatina Слатина
- Village
- Location within Serbia
- Coordinates: 44°30′N 20°26′E
- Country: Serbia
- District: Belgrade District
- Municipality: Sopot

Population (2022)
  - Total: ▼222
- Time zone: UTC+1 (CET)
  - Summer (DST): UTC+2 (CEST)

Slatina (Serbian: Слатина) is a village in the municipality of Sopot, Serbia. According to the 2022 census, the village has a population of 222 people.
