= Vane Bor =

Painter (1908–1993)

- Born: Stevan Živadinović; 20 November 1908; Bor, Kingdom of Serbia
- Died: 6 May 1993 (aged 84); Oxford, United Kingdom
- Style: Writer, painter, photographer
- Movement: Surrealism

Stevan Živadinović (20 November 1908 – 6 May 1993), known by his pen name Vane Bor, was a Serbian artist active in the Surrealist movement. He produced various collages, photograms and photographs, as well as theoretical texts and poems. He is best known for his books "Vane Bor i Marko Ristić" and "Anti-zid" which influenced many writers, including Aleksandar Vučo, Marko Ristić, Rastko Petrović, Oskar Davičo, and others.

He was born in the mining village of Bor, from which he took his pseudonym. His parents were Dragutin and Desanka Živadinović, both prominent doctors. His sister, Jelica, became better known as Ševa Ristić, also a surrealist artist and married to Marko Ristić.
