= Drlupa (Sopot) =

Drlupa Дрлупа
- Village
- Location within Serbia
- Coordinates: 44°27′N 20°30′E
- Country: Serbia
- District: Belgrade District
- Municipality: Sopot

Population (2022)
  - Total: ▼458
- Time zone: UTC+1 (CET)
  - Summer (DST): UTC+2 (CEST)

Drlupa (Serbian Cyrillic: Дрлупа) is a village in the municipality of Sopot, Serbia. According to the 2022 census, the village has a population of 458 people.

== History ==
Drlupa is located southwest of Sopot. We have the oldest written data about this village from the beginning of the 18th century. On the map from the time of Austrian rule (1718–1739), this village is recorded as a settlement under the name. The village used to be in Seliste, according to the legend, and "it was destroyed by the emperor". In 1721, the Austrian authorities ordered the villages to be looted. At that time, according to tradition, Prince Milovan, the ancestor of today's Matićs, was in Drlupa. The emperor ordered him to "squeeze the villages into shores." That is why he invited all the peasants to an agreement in Vrbica. But the gathered peasants did not agree and did not want to carry out the order. "That is why Caesar sent two katanas to the village," one of which killed the peasants. Now, the emperor himself went with his army to Drlupa and "displaced it." They say that the town was located north of the village, under Boblija.

After 1739, the displaced population began to return and new settlers arrived. The oldest families are considered to be: Sirkovići antiquity from Bihor, Ljubićići antiquity from Sjenica. Then Paunovići, Stamenići and Savići. etc.

The first major conflict between the Serbs and the Turks in the First Serbian Uprising was in Drlupa (Battle of Drlupa). The battle took place on February 25, 1804, in the middle of failed negotiations between Karađorđe and Aganlija, who was considered the most conciliatory among the Dahis. The wounded Aganlija withdrew to Belgrade the next day, which is why it is believed that the insurgents won in Drlupa. In the first decades of the 19th century, Drlupa became a part of Katić's principality and had 37 houses in 1818 and 44 houses in 1822. According to the year 1921, the village had 150 houses with 933 inhabitants.

Jovan Matić donated land with a house for the school that served at that period. (data from 1921).
