= Petar Popović (poet) =

Yugoslavian poet and surrealist

Petar Popović (Belgrade, 1904–1995) was a Yugoslav poet and Surrealist.

== Biography ==
Petar Petrović was born in 1904 in Belgrade into a middle-class family. He too was evacuated in 1915 in France, where for the next four years he continued his Gymnasium studies. Upon his return to Serbia after the war, he resumed his high school education in Belgrade and in 1923, graduated. Then, he enrolled at the University of Belgrade Faculty of Science's Department of Chemistry from where he graduated in 1928. With the creation of first group of Surrealists in 1930, he was one of the 13 signatories of their Manifesto in the Almanac Nemoguče-L'Impossible where two of his article were also featured.

In 1931, he issued a surrealist plaque with a photomontage of Neću, testera stvarnosti (I Don't Want, a tester of reality). He collaborated in the magazine Surrealism Today and Here in 1932. From 1932 until 1940, he worked as a professor and translator. After retirement, in 1969, Petar Petrović donated a legacy with books and other objects to the Museum of the City of Belgrade.

From 1969 until his death in 1995, he was an expert guide at the Museum of Paja Jovanović in Belgrade.

== Bibliography ==
- Crna Gora u doba Petra I i Petra II (Montenegro at a time of Peter I and Peter II), 1951;
- Francusko-srpski odnosi za vreme prvog srpskog ustanka: Napoleon i Karađorđe (French-Serbian relations at the time of the First Serbian Uprising: Napoleon and Karađorđe), 1933;
- Pozicija nadrealizma (Position of Surrealism), co-author, reprint: 2012;
- Nikanor Ivanović-Njegoš, 1959;
- Praistorija Vojvodine (Pre-History of Vojvodina), co-author, 1974;
- Jedan Vojvođanin u službi Crne Gore (A Vojvodinian in the service of Montenegro), 1957;
- Pitanje "organizovanje sile" u Crnoj Gori u doba Petra I (Question "orgnaizationof force" in Montenegro at the time of Peter I), 1958);
- O kulturno-prosvetnoj delatnosti u Crnoj Gori u doba Kenza Danila (About cultural work in Montenegro at the time of Prince Danilo), 1969.
