= Milan Bogdanović =

Serbian writer

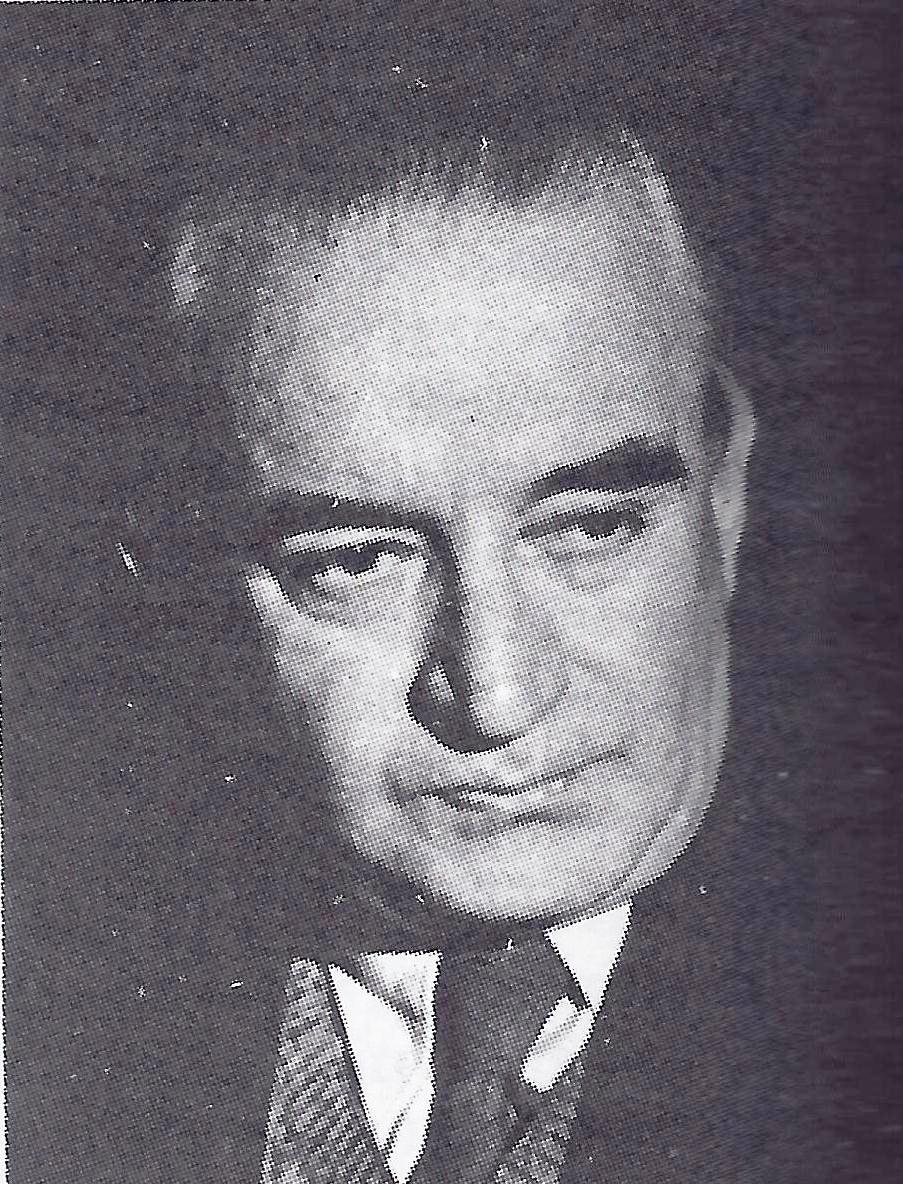
Milan Bogdanović

Milan Bogdanović (Belgrade, January 4, 1892 – Belgrade, February 28, 1964) was a Serbian writer and literary critic.

== Biography ==
He finished elementary school and gymnasium in Pozarevac where his father was the then administrator of the royal estate Ljubičevo (where the Ljubičevo Equestrian Games are now being held). He was a volunteer in Serbian Army during the Balkan Wars in 1912–1913. He was wounded during the First World War and he subsequently received the Medal of Miloš Obilić.

He was the editor of the "Republika" (1920–1930), the "Serbian Literary Messenger" (1928–1932), the newspaper "Danas" (1932, together with Miroslav Krleža) and "Književne novine" (1949–1950), as well as the theater manager in Novi Sad and Belgrade. He was a member of the Serbian Academy of Sciences and Arts.

His works were published in the multicultural book entitled "Old and New". In 1968, Milan Bogdanović Award for literary criticism was introduced.

Milan Bogdanović is buried in the Belgrade New Cemetery's Alley of the Greats.

== Personal life ==
In the marriage with Mileva Mihailović, he had two children. His son is an architect and former Mayor of Belgrade Bogdan Bogdanović, and daughter Ivana Bogdanović was a professor of the Faculty of Philology at the University of Belgrade and the mother of writer Ivan Đurić. In 1937, Bogdanović converted to Islam, taking a name Mefail.
