= Radojica Živanović Noe =

Serbian painter and graphic artist

Radojica Živanović Noe (Belgrade, 1903 – Belgrade, 1944) was a painter and graphic artist of the period of Surrealism and a writer. He left a small number of compositions, still lifes, landscapes and drawings. The most significant period of Živanović's artistic creation is his affiliation with the Surrealist movement (1930–33). He was one of the thirteen signatories of the Manifesto of Surrealism and the only professional painter in the group of artists who initiated the Belgrade Surrealist movement.

He published surrealist works in the Almanac Nemoguće-L'Impossible and magazine Surrealism today and here. He is the first and most consistent surrealist in Yugoslav painting. He replaced the surrealist phase by painting still lifes in the manner of Paul Cézanne, a landscape from Serbia under the influence of classical Impressionism and realistic portraits. As a member of the group known as the "Life art association," he advocated social art, more theoretically than practically. He led controversies and wrote art reviews. For some time he was an art critic at the newspaper Politika. His works can be found in National Museum in Belgrade, Museum of Contemporary Art, and the Art Gallery of Bosnia and Herzegovina in Sarajevo as well as private collections.

== Biography ==
Radojica Živanović Noe was born in Belgrade as an illegitimate child. His mother was a laundress, and his father's name is unknown. Among the Belgrade Surrealists, it was said that he was supposed to play the role of Heir to the Throne, a fake royal newborn, son Draga and Aleksandar Obrenović. After the war was interrupted by schooling, he graduated from the Trade Academy and then spent three years (until 1929) at the Royal Art School in Belgrade.

== Artwork ==
Radojica Živanović Noe was one of thirteen signatories Manifesto of Surrealism in the 1930 Almanac Nemoguće-L'Impossible. He was the only professional painter in the group of artists who started Belgrade Surrealism. From 1931 to 1932, he collaborated intensively in the magazine Nadrealista Danas i Ovde (Surrealism Today and Here), in which most of his works have been published. In 1934, with Mirko Kujačić, Đorđe Andrejević Kun, Đurđe Teodorović and other artists, he founded the group Život ("Life" Art Association). From 1935 to 1937, he wrote regular art reviews for the newspaper Politika, and sometimes published articles in the magazine Naša stvarnost (Our Reality).

=== Exhibitions ===
In 1932, he exhibited a cycle of surrealist paintings in Cvijeta Zuzorić Art Pavilion in Belgrade, and from 1936 to 1940 at several group art exhibitions.

=== The most important works ===
- A series of drawings published in 1930 in the almanac Impossible, the most famous of which are: "Suicide or Dreamer", "Pulse", "The Beginning of the Same Place", as well as the photo collage "Sleeping Golden Passion".
- Papers published in the magazine "Surrealism Today and Here", the most famous of which are: "Memory" and "Eye Tree".

== Death ==
He spent years during World War II on the outskirts of Belgrade. He died before the end of the war, in 1944, at Dorćol. When he heard that partisans and Russian tanks penetrated the street, he ran out of a shelter near Bajloni's greenmarket and entered the fray against the German units. Surprised by the liberation forces, he allegedly did not agree to disarm and lost his life owing to a tragic misunderstanding.

== See more ==
- List of Serbian painters
