= Rastko Petrović =

Serbian poet and writer (1898–1949)

Rastko Petrović Растко Петровић
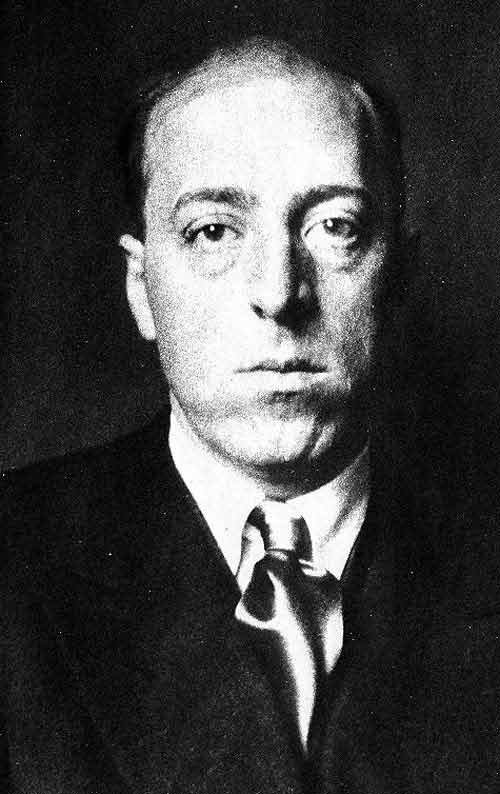
- Photo of Petrović in his 40s
- Born: 3 March 1898; Belgrade, Kingdom of Serbia
- Died: 15 August 1949 (aged 51); Washington, D.C., United States
- Occupations: Poet, novelist, short story writer

Rastko Petrović (1898–1949) was a Serbian poet and writer.

After serving in the Serbian Army in World War I, he studied law in Paris and became a diplomat. Based at the Yugoslav embassy in Washington, D.C. during World War II, he remained in the United States after the war and died there in 1949. In 1986, after official recognition, his remains were brought to Belgrade.

== Works ==
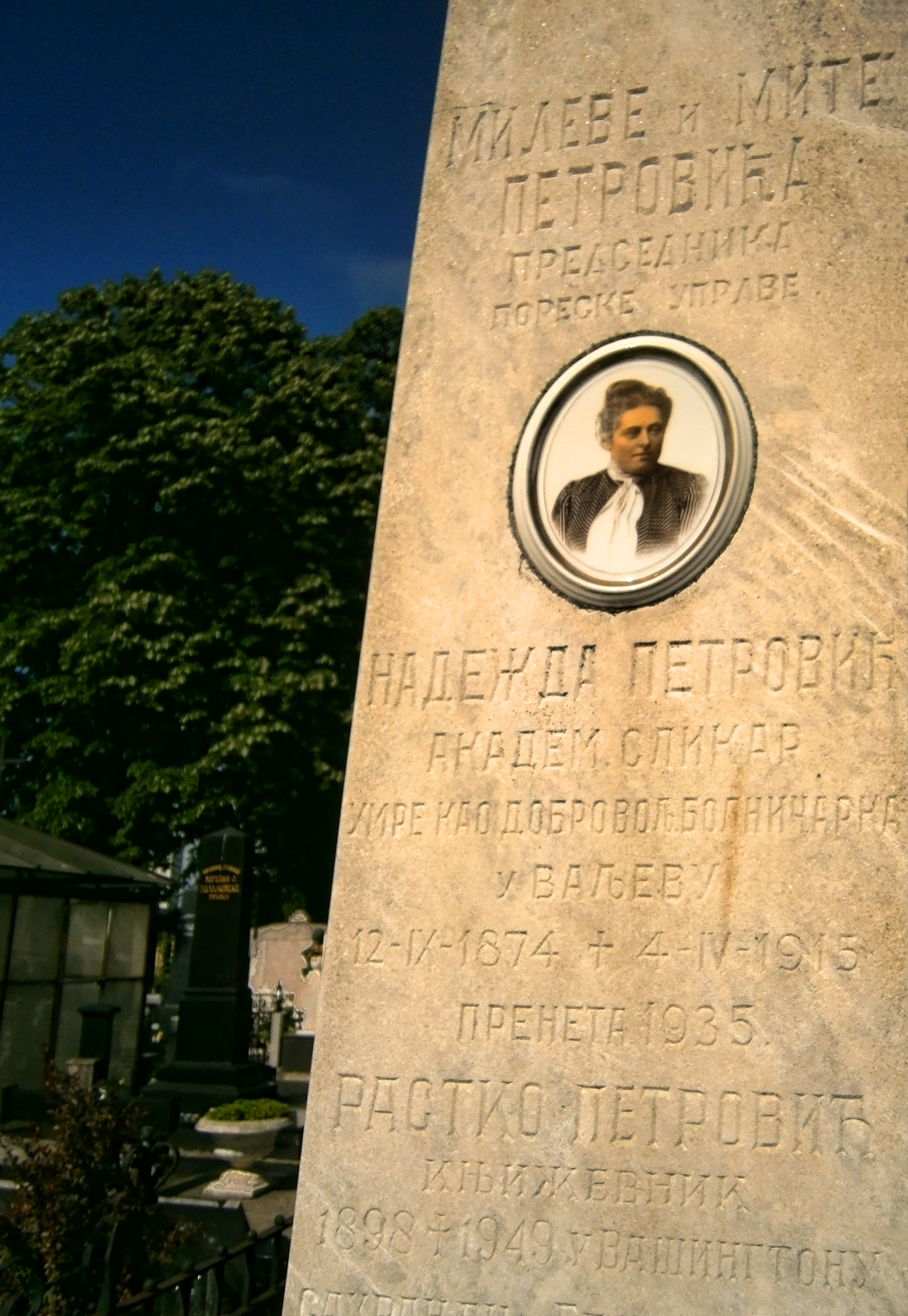
Grave of Rastko and Nadežda Petrović

- Burleska gospodina Peruna, boga groma (A burlesque of Lord Perun, god of thunder), 1921.
- Otkrovenje (Revelation), 1922.
- Afrika, 1930.
- Ljudi Govore (The people speak), 1931.
- Dan šesti (The sixth day), 1961.
