= Oskar Davičo =

Serbian and Yugoslavian novelist and poet

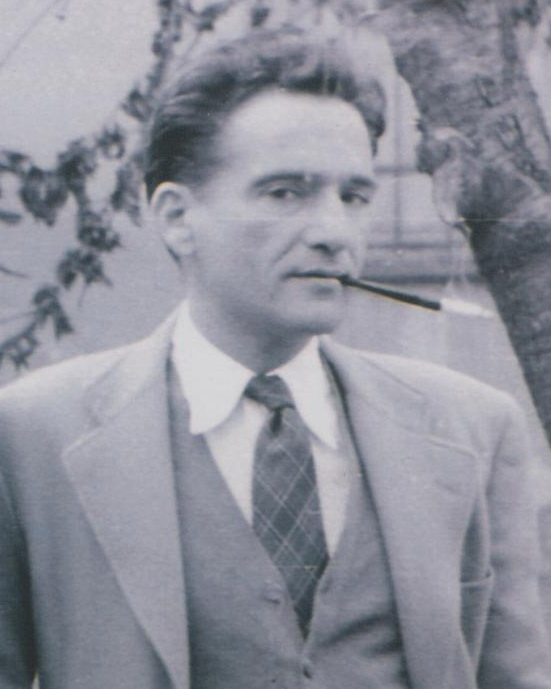
- Oskar Davičo in 1951
- Born: 18 January 1909; Šabac, Kingdom of Serbia
- Died: 30 September 1989 (aged 80); Belgrade, SR Serbia, SFR Yugoslavia
- Resting place: Belgrade New Cemetery
- Education: University of Belgrade Faculty of Philosophy
- Occupations: Novelist, poet
- Writing career
- Pen name: O. Davidović, S. Kovačić, S. Nikolić and Vlada Barbulović
- Language: Serbo-Croatian
- Notable awards: NIN Award; 1956 Beton i svici 1963 Gladi; 1964 Tajne

Oskar Davičo (Serbian Cyrillic: Оскар Давичо; 18 January 1909 – 30 September 1989) was a Serbian novelist and poet. A leading literary figure of his generation, he was one of the most acclaimed Serbian surrealist writers, but also a revolutionary socialist activist and a politician. Davičo was awarded prestigious literary NIN Award a record three times.

== Biography ==
=== Early life ===
Oskar Davičo was born on 18 January 1909 in Šabac to a Sephardic Jewish family. His father was an atheist Jewish accountant and a socialist. During World War I in Serbia, Šabac was the scene of heavy fighting, so the whole family moved temporarily to Negotin.

=== Interwar period ===
Davičo finished the elementary school and lower gymnasium Šabac, and then continued his education at the First Belgrade Gymnasium in Belgrade. Davičo started to write poetry while in gymnasium. He was expelled from the gymnasium in 6th grade for criticizing religion in a self-published magazine. He later graduated as a part-time student in 1926. After that, he left for Paris and enrolled at the University of Paris, studying romance studies. In Paris he worked as a waiter, courier, shoe maker, boxing trainer, and a paid companion of wealthy women. While in Paris, Davičo attended meetings of the Communist Party of France. He left the university without passing a single exam. After two years in France, he returned to Belgrade in 1928 and enrolled at the University of Belgrade Faculty of Philosophy studying French language and French literature. He graduated in 1930 cum laude. Soon after graduation, he found employment as a French language teacher in a high school in Šibenik. He was fired after only three months on the job, and then got a part-time job as a teacher at the First Belgrade Gymnasium, the same school he was expelled from in 1925. In 1931 Davičo got a full-time job as a high school teacher in Bihać. While in Bihać, he secretly founded the local committee of the Communist Party of Yugoslavia (CPY). Communist activity was illegal in the Kingdom of Yugoslavia after 1920. Davičo was arrested on 31 May 1932 after being betrayed by one of the members of the CPY, and the court sentenced him to five years in prison. He served his sentence at Lepoglava prison and Sremska Mitrovica prison. While incarcerated, he wrote a novel titled "Detinjstvo" (Childhood), but did not finish it. The manuscript was lost during his transfer from Lepoglava to Sremska Mitrovica in 1935. After his release, he lived in Belgrade and worked as a co-editor of a magazine called "Naša stvarnost" (Our Reality).

After a broad police action in Belgrade in 1938, Davičo was arrested again, but released soon after. He left Belgrade and moved to Kopaonik. While in Kopaonik, he wrote poem cycles "Hana" and "Srbija" and some other poems that were later published in a collection "Višnja za zidom" (A Cherry Tree behind a Wall). In 1939 he moved to Zagreb on orders of the leadership of the CPY. After he showed "Hana" to Miroslav Krleža and Vaso Bogdanov, they advised him to write a novel about his life in prison. Davičo finished the novel in March 1941, but the April War broke out soon after, and the novel was never printed.

=== World War II ===
Working illegally for the CPY, Davičo moved to Italian-occupied Split, where he was arrested in August 1941. To the Italian police, he gave a fake Jewish name Ostap Daburo, and they did not recognize him. He was taken to an Italian camp for Jews on the island of Korčula and then interned to Lombardy, Italy. During 1942, he tried to escape two times, but failed. He finally escaped in 1943, and moved back to Dalmatia via Monte Gargano. There, he joined the 1st Proletarian Brigade of the Yugoslav Partisans as a soldier. He saw fighting in Bosnia, Montenegro, Sandžak, Tara and Durmitor. He worked briefly in the press bureau of the Central Command on the island of Vis. Davičo rejoined the Brigade and participated in the Belgrade Offensive.

=== Post-World War II ===
After the liberation, Davičo stayed in Belgrade and worked for a month in the newly established Tanjug news agency. From there, he moved to Borba, and then to Glas newspaper. As a reporter, he reported from the Nuremberg Trials, from the Trieste during the Trieste crisis, and from the Greek Civil War, where he joined Markos Vafiadis and his Democratic Army of Greece. After publishing a travel novel about his experiences in Greece in 1947, Davičo left journalism and became a full-time writer and for a time the editor of the literary journal Delo (NoLit, Belgrade). He spent the rest of his life in Belgrade.

=== Death ===
Oskar Davičo died on 30 September 1989 in Belgrade. He is interred in the Alley of Distinguished Citizens in the Belgrade New Cemetery.

== Literary work ==
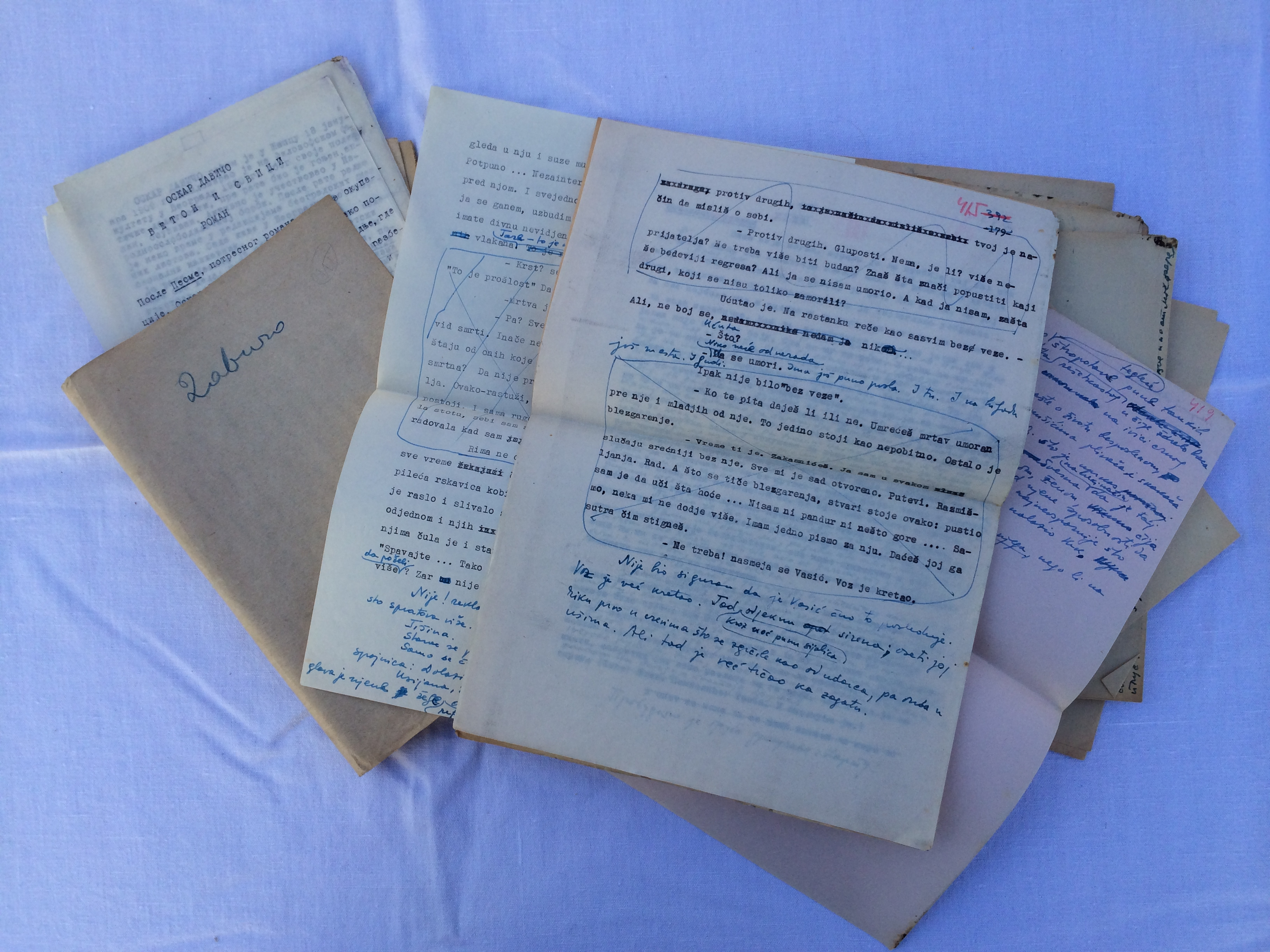
Handwritings of the novel "Beton i svici" by Davičo

Davičo's literary work belongs to the surrealist movement. He started writing poetry in 1925, while in gymnasium. His early poetry is experimental and strongly surrealist. In the late 1930s, he added social and leftist elements to his poetry. Although mainly social, his 1938 poetry book "Pesme" (Poems) also contains humor, word play, and eroticism. His next two poetry books, "Hana" (1939) and "Višnja za zidom" (1950) are thematically linked to "Pesme" and they form a poetic trilogy. The main theme of "Hana" is love, while the theme of "Višnja za zidom" is revolutionary. Similar theme is explored in the poem "Zrenjanin" (1949) about the life and death of Partisan leader Žarko Zrenjanin. The climax of Davičo's surrealist poetry is reached in the poem "Čovekov čovek" (1953). After "Čovekov čovek", Davičo published a dozen more poetry books, which were poorly received with both critic and readers.

Davičo started writing novels during and after the World War II. Novels are the most important part of his work after the poetry. In the novels "Ćutnje" (1963), "Gladi" (1963) "Tajne" (1964), and "Bekstva" (1966), he wrote about the prison life of Yugoslavian Communists in the interwar period. In "Pesma" (1952) and "Gospodar zaborava" (1981), he writes about the World War II in Yugoslavia and the people's liberation movement. Finally, in "Beton i svici" (1956) and "Radni naslov beskraja" (1958), Davičo writes about the post-war build-up of Yugoslavia. The main characters of his novels are usually young revolutionary communists.

For his literary work, Davičo received numerous awards. He was the only author to be awarded the NIN Award for the novel of the year three times: in 1956 for "Beton i svici", in 1963 for "Gladi", and in 1964 for "Tajne".

=== Novels ===
- "Pesma" (Poem), 1952
- "Beton i svici" (Concrete and Fireflies), 1955
- "Radni naslov beskraja" (Working Title of the Eternity), 1958
- "Generalbas", 1962
- "Ćutnje" (Silences), 1963
- "Gladi" (Hungers), 1963
- "Tajne" (Secrets), 1964
- "Bekstva" (The Escapes), 1966
- "Zavičaji" (Homelands), 1971
- "Gospodar zaborava" (The Master of Oblivion), 1980

=== Poetry ===
- "Anatomija" (Anatomy), 1930
- "Pesme" (Poems), 1938
- "Hana", 1939
- "Zrenjanin", 1949
- "Višnja za zidom" (A Cherry Tree Behind a Wall), 1950
- "Čovekov čovek" (A Man's Man), 1953
- "Nastanjene oči" (Occupied Eyes), 1954
- "Flora", 1955
- "Pesme" (Poems), 1958
- "Kairos", 1959
- "Tropi" (Tropics), 1959
- "Sunovrati" (Downfalls), 1963
- "Snimci" (Recordings), 1963
- "Pročitani jezik" (A Language Read), 1972
- "Telo telu" (Body to Body), 1975
- "Veverice-leptiri ili nadopis obojenog žbuna" (Squirrel-butterflies, or By-writing of the Colored Bush), 1976
- "Misterije dana" (Mysteries of a Day), 1979

=== Other ===
- "Među Markosovim partizanima" (Amongst Markos' Partisans), a travel novel, 1947
- "Poezija i otpori" (Poetry and Resistance), an essay, 1952
- "Pre podne" (Ante meridiem), an essay, 1960
- "Crno na belo" (Black on White), a reportage, 1962
- "Trg M" (M Square), a poem, 1968
- "Ritual umiranja jezika" (The Ritual of Language Dying), an essay, 1971
- "Reči na delu" (Words on Work), a poem, 1977
- "Pod-tekst" (Sub-text), essays and polemics, 1979

== Sources ==
- Đorđević, Bane (15 June 2013). "Oskar Davičo: Večito gladan beskraja" [Oskar Davičo: Always in Need of Eternity]. Večernje novosti.
- MAK (11 April 2012). "Oskar Davičo: Pesnik okovanog doba" [Oskar Davičo: Poet of Shackled Age]. Vecernje novosti.
- D. Bt. (11 April 2012). "Spomen-ploča Oskaru Daviču" [Memorial plaque to Oskar Davičo]. Vecernje novosti.
- V. N. (12 April 2012). "Spomen ploča Oskaru Daviču" [Memorial plaque to Oskar Davičo]. Vecernje novosti.
- Petrov Nogo, Rajko (10 May 2011). "Zadatak druga Daviča" [The task of Comrade Davičo]. Vecernje novosti.
- Vitezović, Milovan (4 November 2004). "Davičo čuva stražu" [Davičo Keeps Guard]. Vecernje novosti.
