= Subdivisions of Belgrade =

Administrative divisions of the City of Belgrade

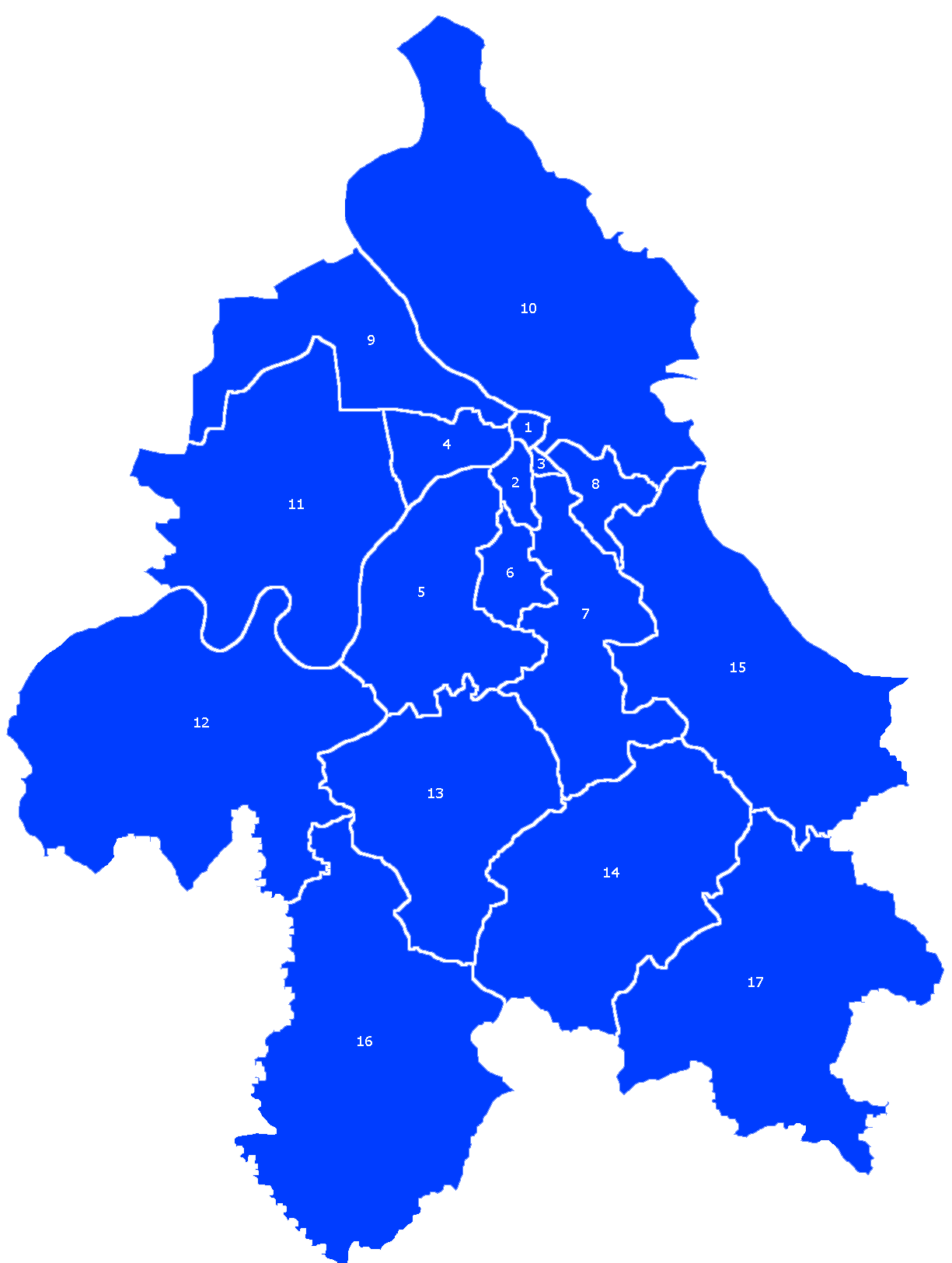

Serbia's capital city of Belgrade is divided into 17 municipalities.

Most of the municipalities are situated on the southern side of the Danube and Sava rivers, in the Šumadija region. Three municipalities (Zemun, Novi Beograd, and Surčin) are on the northern bank of the Sava, in the Syrmia region, and the municipality of Palilula, spanning the Danube, is in both the Šumadija and Banat regions.

== Municipalities ==
	Municipality	Area [km^{2}]	2022 census	2017 estimate
1.	Stari Grad	7	44,737	45,877
2.	Savski Venac	16	36,699	36,222
3.	Vračar	3	55,406	57,483
4.	Novi Beograd	41	209,763	213,985
5.	Čukarica	155	175,793	177,586
6.	Rakovica	29	104,456	108,477
7.	Voždovac	150	174,864	168,242
8.	Zvezdara	31	172,625	163,542
9.	Zemun	154	177,908	173,460
10.	Palilula	447	182,624	181,414
11.	Surčin	285	45,452	46,115
12.	Obrenovac	411	68,882	72,209
13.	Barajevo	213	26,431	26,964
14.	Sopot	271	19,126	19,870
15.	Grocka	289	82,810	86,391
16.	Lazarevac	384	55,146	57,136
17.	Mladenovac	339	56,389	52,159
Total		3,225	1,659,440	1,687,132

== Governmental structure ==
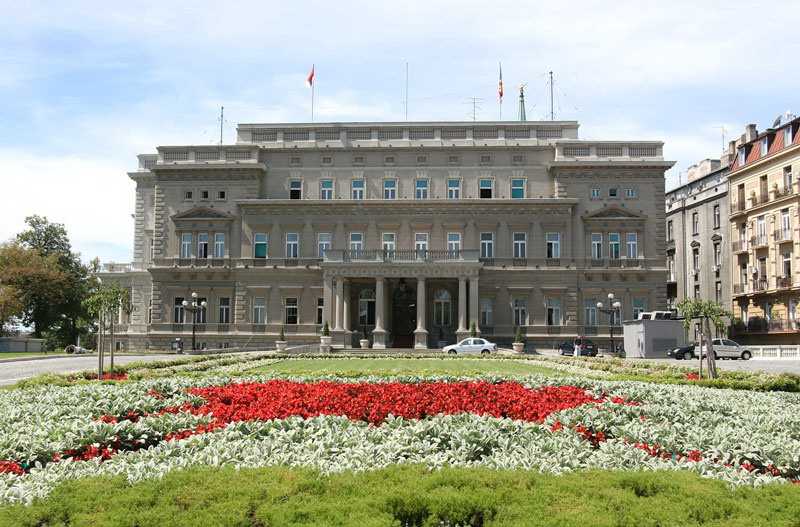
Belgrade City Hall

A municipality is a part of the territory of the City of Belgrade, in which certain operations of local self-government laid down by the City Charter are run. Pursuant to the Constitution, legislation, present Charter and bylaws of the municipality, the citizens participate in conducting operations of the municipality through the councilors elected to the municipal assembly, civil initiative, local citizens’ meeting and referendum.

The bodies of the municipality are:

- Municipal Assembly
- Municipal Council

The number of councilors in the Municipal Assembly ranges from 19 to 75 councilors.

The District Council Chairman presides over the Municipal Assembly and is a chairperson of the Municipal Council. The Municipal Assembly elects the District Council Chairman among the municipal councilors.

The Municipal Council is composed of the District Council Chairman, Deputy District Council Chairman and at the most 7 members. The Municipal Council members are elected by the Municipal Assembly among both councilors and citizens further to the proposal by the District Council Chairman.

== History ==
=== 18th century ===
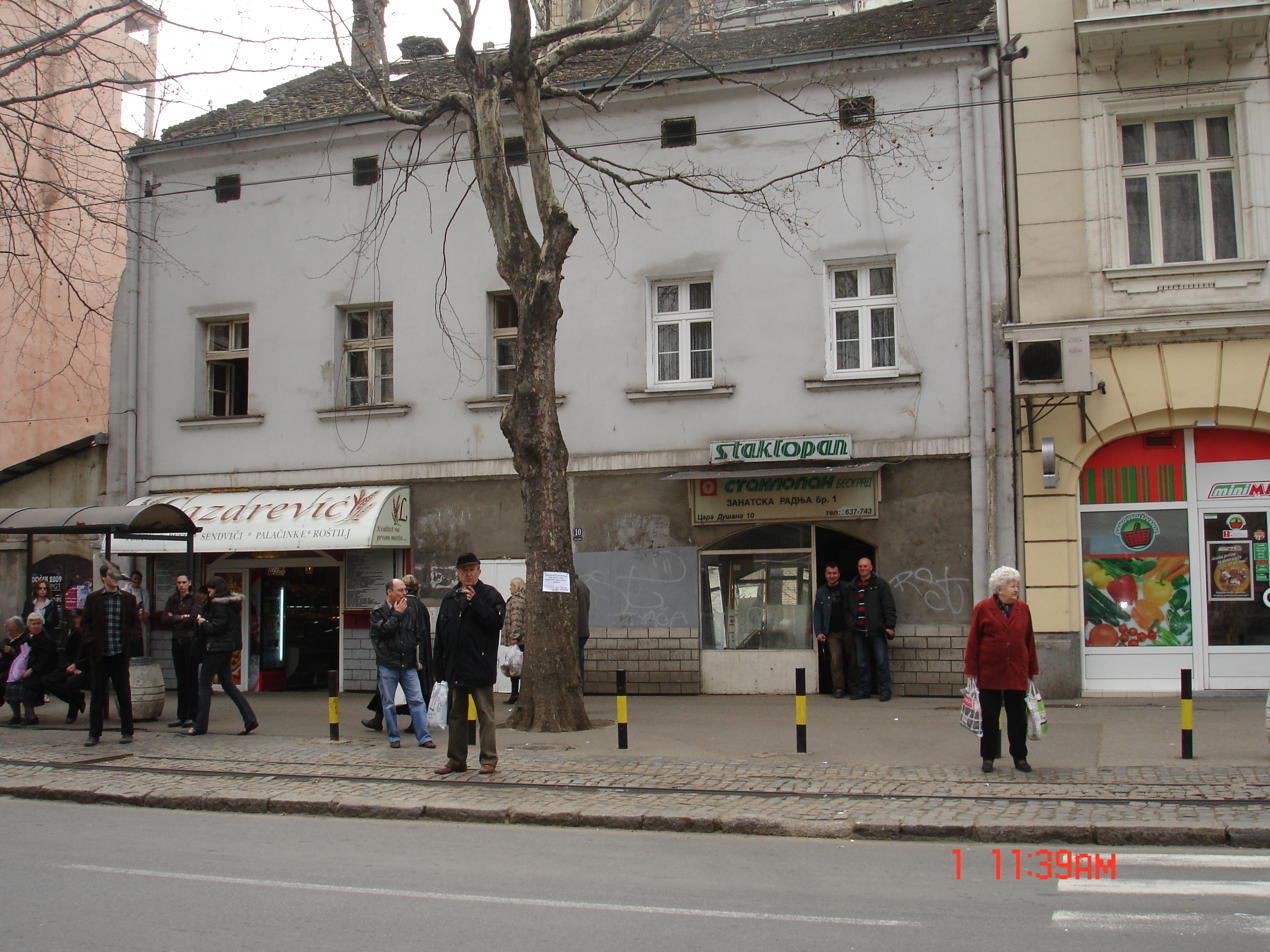
House at 10 Cara Dušana Street, the oldest house in Belgrade and the only surviving part of German Town, administrative neighborhood of Belgrade from the 1730s

During the Austrian occupation of northern Serbia 1718-1739, Belgrade was divided by the governing Austrian authorities into 6 districts: Fortress, Serbian town (modern Kosančićev Venac), German town (modern Dorćol), Lower Serbian town (Savamala), Karlstadt (Palilula) and the Great military hospital (Terazije-Tašmajdan).

=== 19th century ===
During the First Serbian Uprising, the Serbian Administrative Council divided the liberated territory in 12 nahiyah in 1807, confirming more or less the already existing division. One of them, Belgrade Nahiyah, covered mostly the present part of the Šumadija section of the territory of City of Belgrade. The existence of the Belgrade Nahiyah was retained after the Second Serbian Uprising in 1815. In order to replace the division inherited from the Ottoman period, the new, military-based division was introduced in 1834. Belgrade Nahiya was replaced with the Belgrade Okrug, which itself was part of the super-unit of Podunavlje Serdarstvo. Belgrade Okrug occupied territory much wider than the city itself, and was divided into the srez of Kolubara (seated in Šopić), Kosmaj (Sopot), Podunavlje (Grocka), Posavina (Ostružnica) and Turija (Darosava). Almost all villages became seats of the municipalities. In 1837, Kosmaj was annexed to Podunavlje. In 1838 the military administration was replaced with the civilian one.

After 1806, the rebellion leaders divided Belgrade into quarters, for practical purposes. The city had no officially named streets at the time, so the houses were numbered by the quarter to which they belonged. The administration of Belgrade City was established in 1839, according to the Law on the organization of municipalities. In 1841 the administration was made independent from the Ministry of the Interior, though the government still supervised the courts, police and administration. On 15 March 1847, the city administration asked from the Ministry of the Interior to do the numbering of the houses. The ministry suggested the division of the entire city into quarters and on 9 February 1848 proposed division into six quarters: Metropolitan, Zerek (Dorćol), Savamala, Terazije, Palilula and Vračar.

On 2 July 1856 the srez of Turija was abolished and divided between Kosmaj and Kolubara, and the new srez of Vračar was formed from the parts of Podunavlje (which was renamed to Grocka) and Posavina. The Vračar Srez covered the area directly surrounding the city itself, including the villages of Banjica, Beli Potok, Jajinci, Kaluđerica, Kumodraž, Leštane, Mali Mokri Lug, Mirijevo, Pinosava, Rakovica, Resnik, Rušanj, Slanci Veliki Mokri Lug, Vinča and Višnjica from Podunavlje and Kneževac, Žarkovo and Železnik from Posavina. Additions to Vračar included Ostružnica on 14 March 1861, Ripanj on 14 February 1886 and Zuce in 1890, while Topčider was transferred from Podunavlje directly under the Belgrade administration, becoming part of the city on 1 July 1863.

In December 1859, mayor of Belgrade, at that time called "city administrator", Nikola Hristić, again suggested the division of Belgrade into quarters, which would move the city further from the oriental way of administration and mark the beginning of the modern, European way of local governing. Ministry of interior forwarded his request to the State Council and to Prince of Serbia Miloš Obrenović. They accepted the proposition and on 5 September [O.S. 24 August] 1860, Prince Miloš signed ukaz by which Belgrade, with some 3,000 houses at the time, was divided into six quarters. The quarters were sub-areal organs of the municipal administration and had certain jurisdiction over political and public security, construction, administrative works, education, health care, social care, etc. By the 1883 census, the city had a population of 36,177, or by the quarters: Palilula 7,118, Terazije 6,333, Vračar 5,965, Dorćol 5,728, Savamala 5,547 and Varoš 4,519. Remaining 767 inhabitants lived in Topčider, which wasn't organized as a quarter. Additional quarter called Grad (Town), which occupied the fortress area while it was inhabited, existed between the censuses of 1890 and 1910, before being abolished on 24 August 1913.

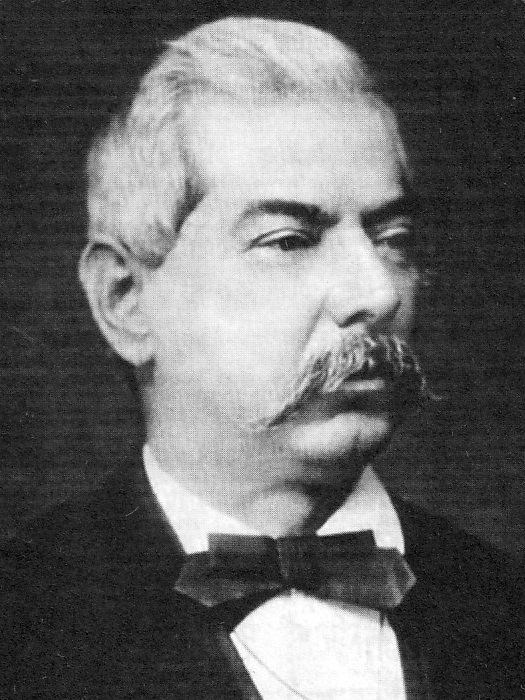
Nikola Hristić, mayor who divided Belgrade into quarters in the 1860s

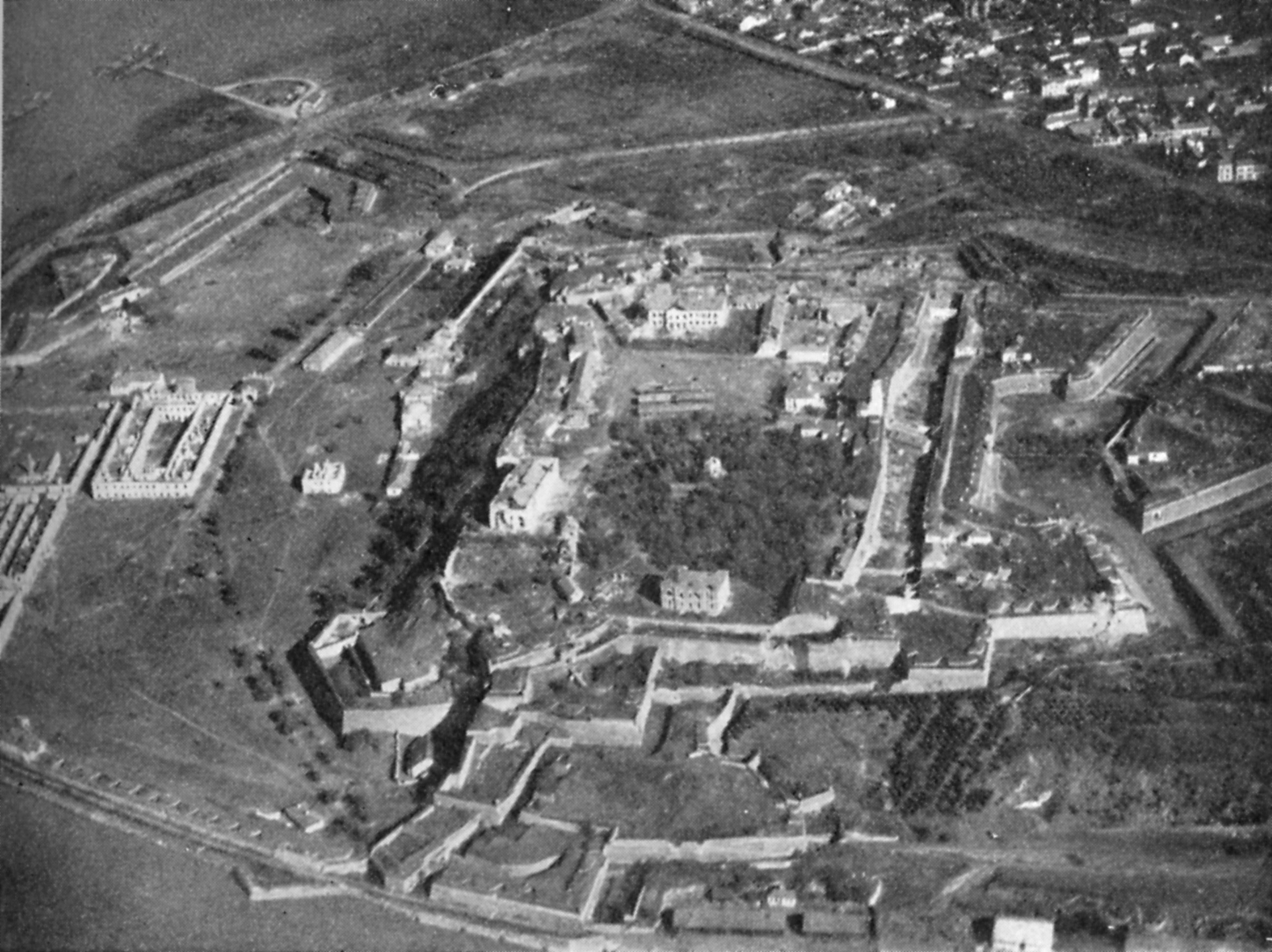
Belgrade Fortress in 1914, while it was still populated and made one of the city quarters

After the administrative reforms on 25 November 1889 (concerning municipalities) and 15 March 1890 (administrative division), Belgrade Okrug merged with Smedervo Okrug into Podunavlje Okrug while Vračar Srez consisted of 16 municipalities and 22 settlements in total, all of which were villages: Beli Potok (including Selo Rakovica), Kumodraž, Leštane (including Zuce), Mali Mokri Lug, Mirijevo, Pinosava, Resnik, Ripanj, Rušanj, Slanci, Veliki Mokri Lug, Veliko Selo, Vinča, Višnjica, Žarkovo and Železnik.

Quarters of Belgrade by the census:

Quarter	1883	1890	1895	1900	1905	1910	1921	1931
Dorćol	5,728	8,104	8,840	11,300	12,851	12,654	13,911	-
Grad	-	2,219	2,281	2,777	2,396	454	-	-
Palilula	7,318	10,651	11,442	13,149	14,667	18,513	26,235	-
Savamala	5,547	6,981	6,516	8,033	9,504	9,567	11,924	-
Terazije	6,333	5,273	6,074	6,494	6,260	9,049	7,038	-
Topčider(-Senjak)	767	1,675	2,815	2,818	3,534	3,540	8,476	-
Varoš	4,519	4,671	4,357	4,606	4,114	5,506	6,595	-
Vračar	5,965	15,189	17,465	19,304	23,909	23,215	37,560	-
City of Belgrade	-	-	-	-	-	-	-	238,775
City of Pančevo	-	-	-	-	-	-	-	22,089
City of Zemun	-	-	-	-	-	-	-	28,074
Total Belgrade	36,177	54,763	59,790	68,481	77,235	82,498	111,739	288,938

The surrounding Belgrade Okrug and its constituent srez:

Okrug/Srez	1890	1895	1900	1905	1910	1921	1931
Belgrade Okrug	104.462	113.357	127.353	141.235	157.220	138.920	151.196
Vračar Srez	20.159	21.615	25.176	28.059	32.608	30.562	34.996
Grocka Srez	17.422	18.675	20.711	22.852	25.049	22.433	27.108
Kolubara Srez	20.876	21.461	23.806	26.417	29.702	24.874	30.272
Kosmaj srez	25.021	28.532	32.359	35.607	38.519	33.518	24.397
Posavina Srez	20.984	23.074	25.301	28.300	31.342	27.533	34.423

=== 20th century ===
==== Before World War II ====
Belgrade Okrug was restored in its previous borders on 24 January 1900, with the division of Podunavlje. Čukarica was transferred from Vračar Srez to the Belgrade City administration on 8 July 1907. In 1913 Belgrade Okrug consisted of two srez: Vračar, in its previous borders, and Grocka. Grocka Srez included Begaljica, Boleč, Brestovik, Vrčin, Grocka, Dražanj, Zaklopača, Kamendol, Mala Ivanča, Mali Požarevac, Pudarci, Ritopek, Senaja, Umčari and Šepšin. The law on 24 August 1913 confirmed the division of Belgrade into 7 quarters.

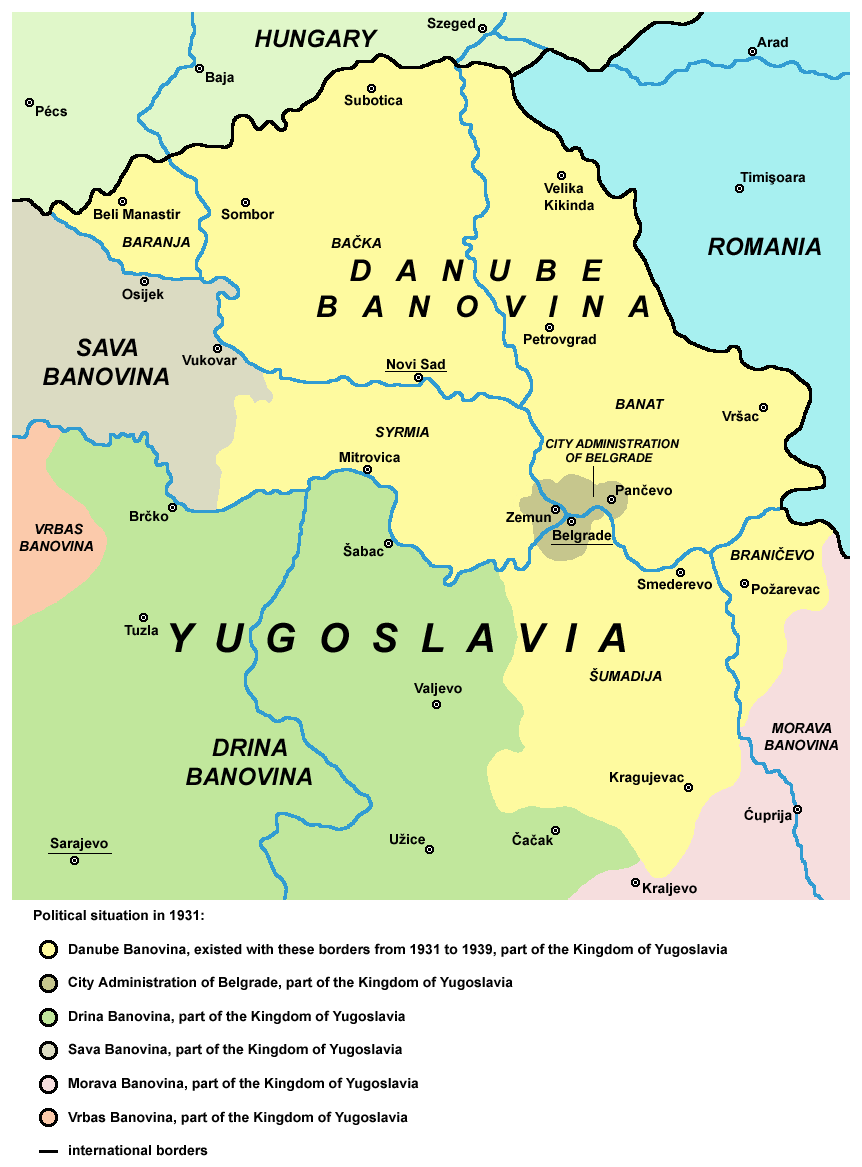
Regional map of the Yugoslav division into the banovinas, showing the area of the Administration of Belgrade City (1929-1941)

After the May Coup, a new law was adopted on 18 June [O.S. 5 June] 1903 which created a modern local self-governance. The city was administered by the cabinet of the president of the municipality, with offices for different aspects of city life, like modern secretariats. Two specific directories were the one for the trams and another for the social and health care. Still, the division on six quarters remained until the Austro-German occupation of the city in 1915, during World War I. After the liberation in 1918, city was administratively expanded to include its outer suburbs like Dušanovac and Voždovac.

In the 1918-1921 period, after the creation of the Kingdom of Serbs, Croats and Slovenes, the division was kept and the Belgrade Okrug was restored to its pre-1913 borders. In 1922 the new state was divided into oblasts. Belgrade Oblast included just the immediate southwest surroundings of Belgrade but on the north it spread all over to the Hungarian and Romanian border. The oblasts were abolished in 1929 and replaced with banovinas.

In 1922 a new statute envisioned a regular elections for the city assembly every 3 years. Winning party would de allocated two thirds of the seats, while the rest would be divided among the opposition parties, using the proportional system. After the 6 January Dictatorship was introduced by the king Alexander I of Yugoslavia in 1929, part of the 1922 statute was abolished and the opposition's third in the city assembly was allocated by the prerogative of the Minister of the Interior. Administratively, area of Belgrade was expanded. Towns of Zemun, across the Sava, and Pančevo, across the Danube, were annexed to the city territory on 4 October 1929, forming the Administration of Belgrade City, but remained separate settlements. Zemun lost its separate status and became part of the Belgrade settlement in 1934. The area of the city was divided into 14 quarters (including the original 6), for the purposes of the more effective administration, police and courts. In 1935 3 additional quarters were formed, lifting the total number to 17.

New law on municipalities in March 1933 stipulated for the creation of relatively large municipalities, with over 3,000 inhabitants. This caused a major regrouping of the municipalities in the state. Also, the self-administration of the municipalities was limited as they were heavily administered by the state administration which now became the supervising organs. In the 1921–1931, only one new municipality was formed in the Vračar Srez.

==== World War II ====
After occupation of Yugoslavia in April 1941, German occupational administration divided Occupied Serbia into 14 okrugs, one of them being Belgrade Okrug. They kept the division into srez and further into municipalities. The okrug in this period included 9 srez: Belgrade [Municipality], Grocka, Umka, Sopot, Lazarevac, Mladenovac, Smederevo, [Smederevska] Palanka and Veliko Orašje. Yugoslav Partisans in time formed their own administrative bodies, called people's liberation boards (NOO). At first temporary organs, after the German defeat in 1944-1945 they became the units of the new administrative division. Some of such local bodies on the present Belgrade territory included NOO Zemun (in 1943), NOO Mladenovac Srez, NOO Grocka Srez and NOO Kosmajski Srez (all in 1944).

==== After World War II ====
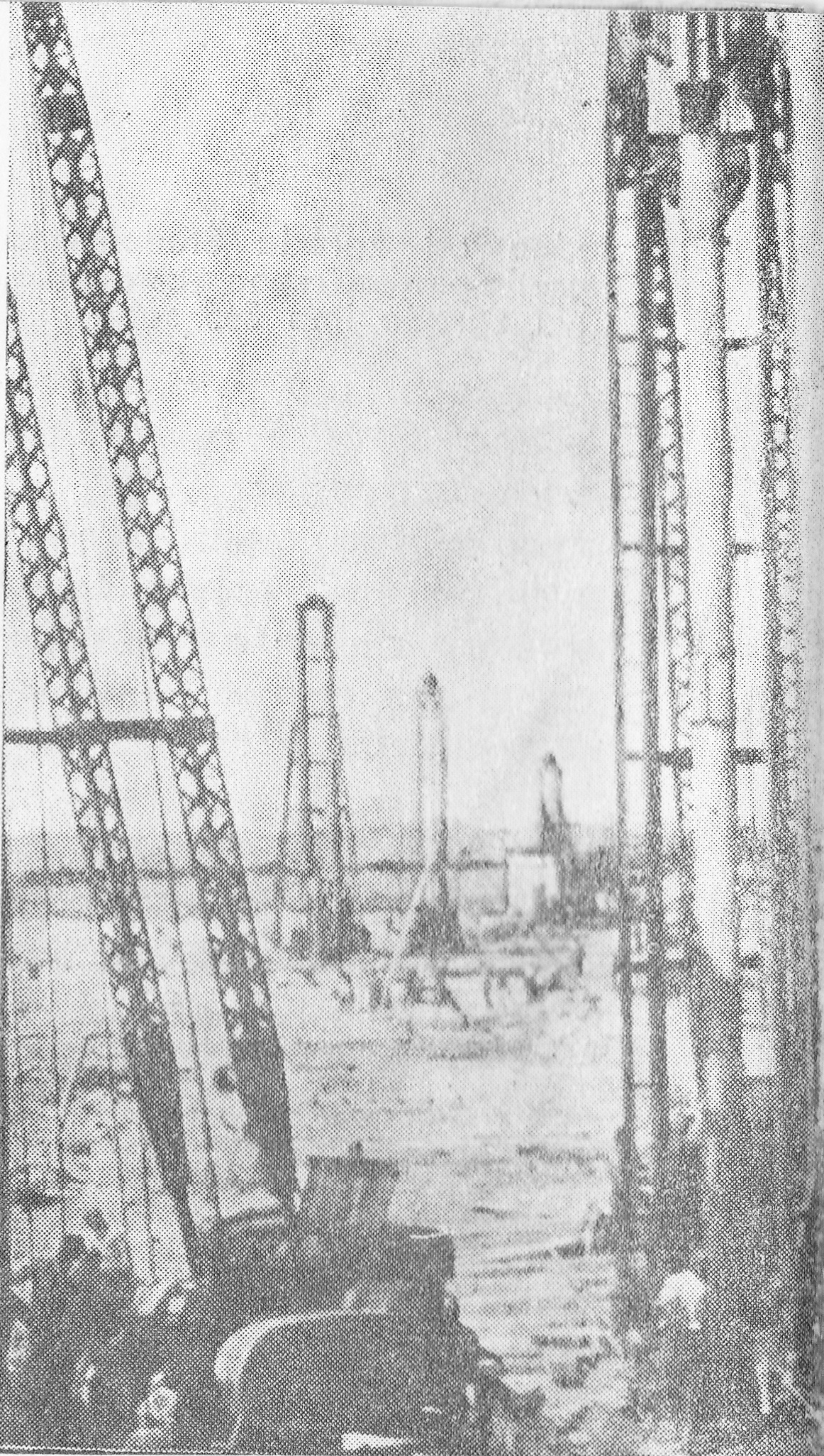
Accelerated construction of New Belgrade began in 1948. A new Raion X was created in 1950 encompassing the new city. New Belgrade became municipality in 1952 and annexed the neighboring Bežanija in 1955

After the World War II liberation, new Communist authorities abolished the quarters on formed 14 raions in November 1944. Each had its own NOO. On 11 December 1944 the raions were organized as the full local administrations, with corresponding departments. They were subordinated to the Executive Board of the Belgrade City NOO. They were merged on 8 September 1945, leaving a total of 7 raions. In June 1945, NOO's for the neighborhoods, as parts of the raions (mimicking the former quarters), were formed, but were abolished in December 1946. In May 1947 the raions were reorganized and re-numerated, lifting their number to 8 and labeling from I to VIII. Raion IX was formed in April 1949 and raion X in April 1950 (New Belgrade and Bežanija).

Belgrade Okrug was restored by the new authorities on 1 September 1945, but was abolished on 18 April 1947, with all the other okrugs in Serbia. Belgrade Okrug was divided in two: Belgrade Srez and Kosmaj Srez. Srez' were not part of the local self-administration, that is, not administered by the city government but directly by the state government. On 16 May 1950, additional administrative super-units of oblasts were created. Belgrade Oblast included 24 srez' and the Belgrade City. Oblasts were abolished on 1 December 1951.

Raions	1948
I raion	48,701
II raion	44,613
III raion	52,595
IV raion	58,536
V raion	52,302
VI raion	39,138
VII raion	32,644
VIII raion	37,237
Krnjača municipality	2,050
Belgrade City	367,816
Belgrade Srez	91,218
Kosmaj Srez	56,525
Zemun Srez	34,679
Belgrade surroundings	182,422

Constituent municipalities of the surrounding okrugs were:

Okrug	Municipalities
Belgrade	Barajevo, Baćevac, Begaljica, Beli Potok, Beljina, Boleč, Boždarevac, Dražanj, Grocka, Guncati, Jajinci, Kaluđerica, Kneževac, Kumodraž, Leštane, Lisović, Mala Ivanča, Mali Mokri Lug, Manić, Meljak, Mirijevo, Ostružnica, Pinosava, Resnik, Ripanj, Ritopek, Rušanj, Slanci, Sremčica, Šiljakovac, Umka, Velika Moštanica, Veliki Borak, Veliki Mokri Lug, Veliko Selo, Vinča, Višnjica, Vranić, Vrčin, Zaklopača, Zuce, Žarkovo, Železnik
Kosmaj	Amerić, Babe, Drlupa, Dubona, Dučina, Đurinci, Guberevac, Jagnjilo, Kovačevac, Koraćica, Mali Požarevac, Markovac, Međulužje, Mladenovac Varoš, Mladenovac Selo, Nemenikuće, Parcani, Popović, Pružatovac, Rajkovac, Ralja, Rogača, Ropočevo, Senaja, Sibnica, Sopot, Stojnik, Šepšin. Velika Ivanča, Velika Krsna, Vlaška
Zemun	Ašanja, Batajnica, Bežanija, Bečmen, Boljevci, Deč, Dobanovci, Jakovo, Karlovčić, Kupinovo, Mihaljevci, Obrež, Petrovčić, Progar, Surčin, Šimanovci, Ugrinovci

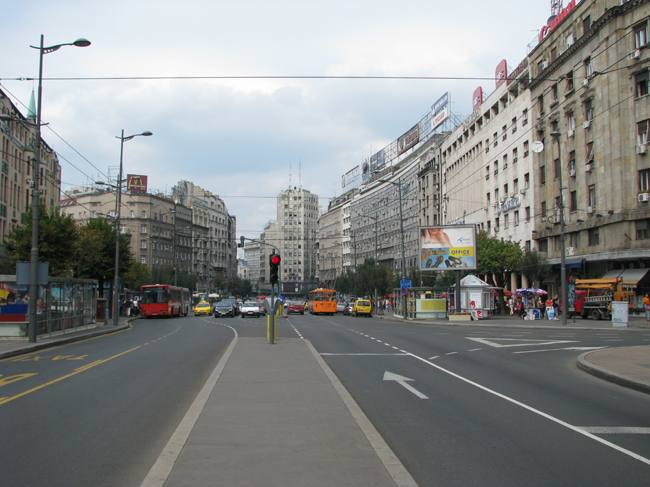
Belgrade's downtown square Terazije had a separate municipality from 1952 to 1957

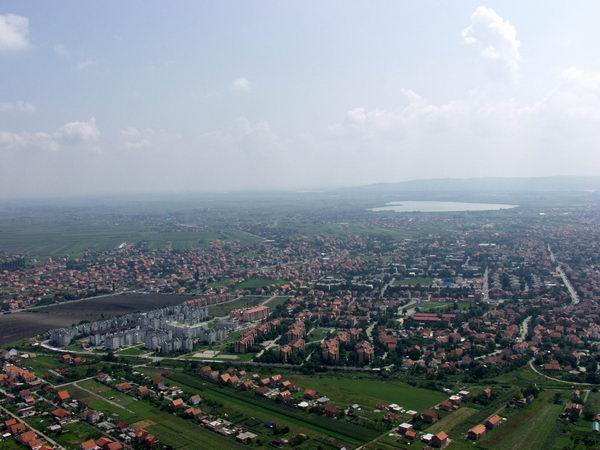
Borča had its own municipality from 1952 until 1955 when was annexed to Krnjača. In turn, Krnjača became part of the Palilula municipality in 1965

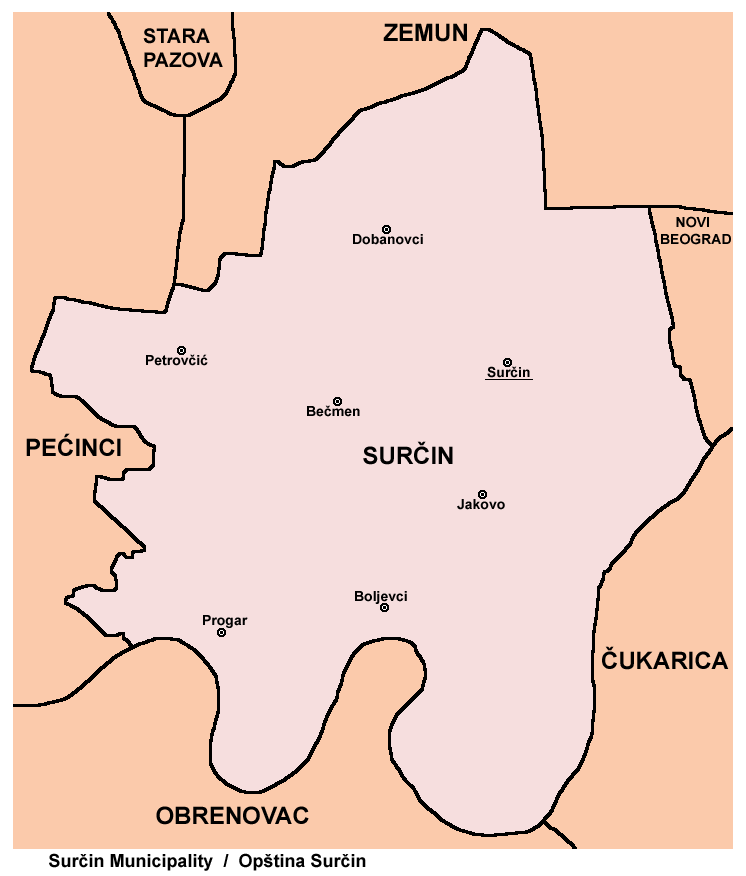
Surčin municipality, abolished in 1965, was recreated in 2003 as the youngest, 17th municipality of Belgrade

On 29 May 1952 city was reorganized into 23 municipalities: 14 urban (Voždovac, Vračar, Zvezdara, Lekino Brdo, Neimar, New Belgrade, Palilula, Savski Venac, Skadarlija, Stari Grad, Stari Đeram, Terazije, Topčidersko Brdo, Čukarica); 8 suburban (Bežanija, Borča, Žarkovo, Železnik, Krnjača, Ovča, Padinska Skela, Rakovica and Zemun. On 1 September 1955 Vračar was divided into East Vračar and West Vračar and the municipality of Karaburma was created, lifting the number of municipalities to 25.

By the 1952 reform, Belgrade Srez (also colloquially called Vračar Srez) consisted of 37 municipalities. In 1955, parts of the Zemun and Podunavlje srez' were annexed to the Belgrade Srez, which encircled the urban area of the city and consisted of 35 municipalities. In December 1956 the Belgrade Srez was abolished as such and the administration was taken over by the City of Belgrade, as the srez-level administrative unit. Some parts of the former srez didn't become part of the city, but were added to the surrounding, newly formed Lazarevac and Mladenovac srez'. With numerous mergers, the city was reorganized into 20 municipalities, 10 urban and 10 suburban. At this point, the area was enlarged to 2,090 km^{2}. The core consisting of 10 urban municipalities remained unchanged since then: Čukarica, New Belgrade, Palilula, Rakovica, Savski Venac, Stari Grad, Voždovac, Vračar, Zemun and Zvezdara. In 1957, by the new law, city was divided into 17 municipalities.

Since then, municipalities were being merged, abolished an annexed. In July 1955 many municipalities, especially from the former Belgrade Srez, have been annexed to the municipalities. For example:

- Čukarica (Železnik, Žarkovo)
- Krnjača (Borča, Ovča, Padinska Skela)
- New Belgrade (Bežanija)
- Voždovac (Beli Potok, Jajinci, Kumodraž, Pinosava)
- Zvezdara (Mali Mokri Lug (with Veliki Mokri Lug annexed previously), Kaluđerica, Leštane, Vinča, Mirijevo)

Enlargement of the municipalities continued by the reorganization on 3 January 1957, which is also when separate municipalities became subordinated to the Belgrade City administration:

- Palilula (Karaburma, Višnjica)
- Savski Venac (West Vračar, Topčidersko Brdo)
- Stari Grad (Skadarlija, part of Terazije)
- Voždovac (Lekino Brdo)
- Vračar (recreated; East Vračar, Neimar, part of Terazije)
- Zvezdara (Stari Đeram)

After the 1955-1958 reorganization of municipalities and districts, Barajevo, Obrenovac, Sopot and Grocka became parts of Belgrade. Further changes by 1960 included:

- Barajevo (Arnajevo, Baćevac, Beljina, Boždarevac, Lisović, Veliki Borak, Vranić)
- Čukarica (Rakovica, Velika Moštanica, Umka, Sremčica, Rušanj, Ostružnica, Resnik)
- Grocka (Begaljica, Boleč, Brestovik, Vrčin (partly to Voždovac), Zaklopača; former municipalities of Kaluđerica, Leštane and Vinča detached from Zvezdara and annexed to Grocka)
- Obrenovac (Barič, Draževac, Dren, Grabovac, Konatice, Ljubinić, Mala Moštanica, Mislođin, Orašac, Piroman, Poljane, Ratari, Skela, Stubline, Trstenica, Urovci, Ušće, Veliko Polje, Vukićevica, Zabrežje, Zvečka)
- Palilula (Slanci, Veliko Selo)
- Sopot (Babe, Guberevac, Dučina, Drlupa, Đurinci, Mala Ivanča, Mali Požarevac, Nemenikuće, Parcani, Popović, Ralja, Rogača, Sibnica, Stojnik)
- Surčin (Bečmen, Boljevci, Dobanovci, Jakovo, Petrovčić, Progar
- Voždovac (Ripanj, Zuce (previously merged into the Vrčin municipality); former municipality of Veliki Mokri Lug detached and annexed to Zvezdara)
- Zemun (Batajnica, Ugrinovci)
- Zvezdara (former municipalities of Kaluđerica, Leštane and Vinča detached and annexed to Grocka; former municipality of Veliki Mokri Lug detached from Voždovac and annexed to Zvezdara)

In 1959 Belgrade was organized in 15 municipalities: Barajevo, Čukarica, Grocka, Krnјаča, New Belgrade, Obrenovac, Palilula, Savski Venac, Sopot, Stari Grad, Surčin, Voždovac, Vračar, Zemun and Zvezdara. Rakovica was abolished and annexed to Čukarica. By the constitutional reforms in 1963, People's Boards, which administered the municipalities were transformed into the Municipal Assemblies. In 1965 municipalities of Surčin (annexed to Zemun) and Krnjača (annexed to Palilula) were abolished, reducing the number of municipalities to 13. Additionally, with the abolishment of Kolari municipality and its division between Smederevo and Grocka, former municipalities of Umčari, Pudarci and Kamendol were annexed to Grocka and, thus, to Belgrade. Srez' in the entire state were abolished on 13 March 1967 and Belgrade City began to fully operate as one administrative unit over its municipalities. Administrative division on urban and suburban municipalities was also abolished.

Municipalities of Lazarevac (14) and Mladenovac (15) were administratively annexed to Belgrade in November 1970, finishing the formation of the present city territory. Rakovica (16) was reestablished on 15 October 1974 after splitting from Čukarica, while Surčin (17) split from Zemun on 24 September 2003.

Development of the Belgrade administrative division by the census years:

Municipality	1953	1961	1971	1981	1991	2002	2011
Barajevo	(Note: not part of Belgrade at the time)	17,461	16,552	18,815	21,647	24,641	27,110
Bežanija	3,330	New Belgrade					
Borča	3,384	Krnjača	Palilula				
Čukarica	13,179	79,194	153,052	132,123	154,632	168,508	181,231
East Vračar	35,986	Vračar					
Grocka		23,723	35,275	54,599	69,448	75,466	83,907
Karaburma	9,587	Palilula					
Krnjača	2,936	21,904	Palilula				
Lazarevac			45,675	51,068	58,882	58,511	58,622
Lekino Brdo	24,711	Voždovac					
Mladenovac			47,134	52,489	56,389	52,490	53,096
Neimar	28,885	Vračar					
New Belgrade	8,009	33,347	92,200	173,541	224,424	217,773	214,506
Obrenovac		48,228	53,260	62,612	70,234	70,975	72,524
Ovča	1,767	Krnjača	Palilula				
Padinska Skela	6,694	Krnjača	Palilula				
Palilula	29,289	67,237	126,380	150,484	156,587	155,902	173,521
Rakovica	10,161	Čukarica		87,067	97,752	99,000	108,641
Savski Venac	23,748	74,971	63,531	53,374	47,682	42,505	39,122
Skadarlija	31,281	Stari Grad					
Sopot		23,131	21,166	20,860	20,527	20,390	20,367
Stari Đeram	27,595	Zvezdara					
Stari Grad	42,440	96,517	83,742	73,767	70,791	55,543	48,450
Surčin		21,039	Zemun				43,819
Terazije	17,858	Stari Grad / Vračar					
Topčidersko Brdo	20,469	Savski Venac					
Vračar	(Note: divided among several municipalities)	88,422	84,291	78,862	69,680	58,386	56,333
Voždovac	19,409	85,458	134,206	159,364	161,376	151,768	158,213
West Vračar	21,149	Savski Venac					
Zemun	44,110	74,851	139,958	172,295	181,692	191,645	168,170
Zvezdara	32,795	88,919	112,938	128,753	140,483	132,621	151,808
Žarkovo	4,642	Čukarica					
Železnik	6,758	Čukarica					
Total Belgrade	470,172	844.402	1,209,360	1,470,073	1,602,226	1,576,124	1,659,440

== Today ==
Since 2006, all municipalities which constitute the cities are officially named “city municipalities”, so all 17 municipalities of the City of Belgrade were legally renamed (City municipality of Zemun, City municipality of Sopot, etc.). The name is administrative and same for all municipalities, regardless of the statistical (urban/rural) or practical and colloquial division (urban/suburban).

As of 2018, there are:

- 6 municipalities which are fully urban and integrated into the Belgrade as a settlement (New Belgrade, Rakovica, Stari Grad, Savski Venac, Zvezdara, Vračar)
- 4 municipalities which are partially urban/integrated and partially suburban, including rural areas (Palilula, Zemun, Voždovac, Čukarica)
- 6 municipalities which are suburban, with both urban (usually municipal seats) and rural settlements (Obrenovac, Lazarevac, Sopot, Grocka, Mladenovac, Surčin)
- 1 municipality which is suburban and fully rural (Barajevo)

In 2019 it was announced that the new law will restore the old distinction between the 10 urban and 7 suburban municipalities. In May 2019 the changed Law on the Capital City was adopted in the National Assembly of Serbia but it made no distinction between two zones, urban and suburban, and the official name of the suburban municipalities remained "City Municipality of...", though some of the regulations point to somewhat different jurisdiction between the two.

== See also ==
- List of Belgrade neighborhoods and suburbs
- List of former and proposed municipalities of Belgrade
- Municipalities of Serbia

== Notes ==
Notes:
