= Mala Vrbica =

Mala Vrbica may refer to the following places in Serbia:

- Mala Vrbica (Kladovo)
- Mala Vrbica, Kragujevac
- Mala Vrbica (Mladenovac)
