= Pavlovac Monastery =

Serbian monastery

Coordinates: 44°27′17″N 20°35′50″E

- Манастир Светог Николаја - Павловац
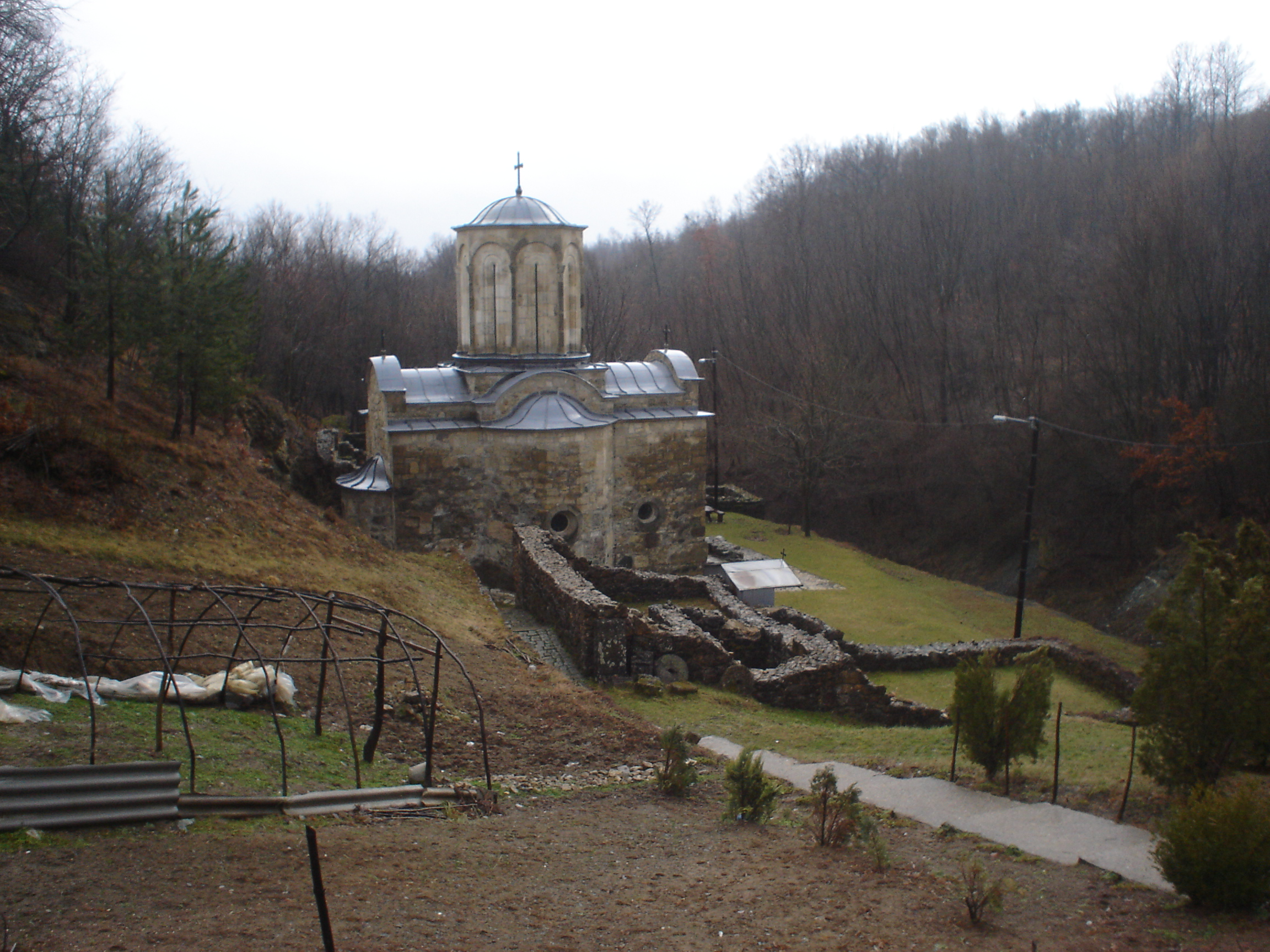

Religion
- Affiliation: Eastern Orthodoxy
- Ownership: Eparchy of Šumadija

Location
- Location: Koraćica
- Municipality: Mladenovac
- Country: Serbia

Architecture
- Date established: 1417; 608 years ago

The Pavlovac Monastery (Serbian Cyrillic: Манастир Павловац, romanized: Manastir Pavlovac) is located in Kosmaj Mountain, in the village of Koraćica, Serbia. It was named after a nearby stream. It is assumed that it was reconstructed under the instruction of Stefan Lazarević, though the monastery was partially built in the 14th century and completed at the start of the 15th century.

In 1690, Patriarch Arsenije III Crnojević performed a final liturgy prior to the Great Migrations of the Serbs to Hungary. The monks who did not leave their spiritual sanctuary were killed by the Ottoman invaders and the buildings in the monastery were set ablaze. From 1963 to 1967, the relics of the martyred monks were identified, marked and laid in the foundation of the newly reconstructed Church of Pavlovac Monastery dedicated to Saint Nicholas after lingering for almost three centuries in total ruin.
