= Beljevac =

Coordinates: 44°21′N 20°39′E

- Village
- Interactive map of Beljevac
- Country: Serbia
- Municipality: Mladenovac
- Time zone: UTC+1 (CET)
  - Summer (DST): UTC+2 (CEST)

Beljevac (Serbian: Бељевац) is a village situated Mladenovac municipality in Serbia.
