= Simmie Free =

American moonshine producer

Simmie Free (January 14, 1892 - May 1, 1980) was an American moonshine producer who spent most of his career in Rabun County, Georgia.

== Early years and education ==
Born to illiterate parents in Rabun County in 1892, Free left school after second grade to help his father produce corn whiskey, or "likker" as it was known in the region.

== Career as a Moonshiner ==
In his early years, Free lived in North Carolina, South Carolina and Tennessee. But in 1938, Free returned to his place of birth, where he began making "likker" on his own. He originally used only corn meal and rye in producing moonshine, buying his meal from Talmadge's Grist Mill in Athens, Georgia; but later included sugar in his production process. In the late 1930s and early 1940s when Free was starting out, moonshine sold for one dollar per gallon and was one of the few ways for southern Appalachian residents who did not live near coal mines or timber producers to make a living. At the height of his career, Free was one of the leading producers in Georgia and served four jail sentences (his granddaughter says "at least twice") for his activities. Free's daughter recollected one event from her childhood, a late-night visit from the sheriff when she was a little girl. “Sit on these quilts” Simmie is reputed to have said, “and don't move!” The child did not move, even when a deputy walked through her room. The quilts hid Mason jars filled "with (her) daddy's hard work".

Before Prohibition, Free claimed in an interview with Atlanta reporter Joseph Earl Dabney "[a]ll the old people usta drink...[e]verybody kept a little flask of likker in his pocket."

== Death ==
Free died May 1, 1980, at the age of 88.

== Legacy ==
One present day distillery, the Dawsonville Moonshine Distillery, traces its recipes to Free.
