= Velika Ivanča =

Coordinates: 44°25′N 20°34′E

- Village
- Interactive map of Velika Ivanča
- Country: Serbia
- District: City of Belgrade
- Municipality: Mladenovac

Population (2011)
  - Total: 1.532
- Time zone: UTC+1 (CET)
  - Summer (DST): UTC+2 (CEST)

Velika Ivanča (Serbian Cyrillic: Велика Иванча, pronounced [ʋělikaː ǐʋantʃa]) is a village situated in Mladenovac municipality in Serbia. The village is 50 kilometres (31 miles) southeast of Belgrade.

== 2013 Velika Ivanča shooting ==
Velika Ivanča was the site of one of the deadliest spree shootings in modern-day Serbia. The shootings occurred in the early hours of 9 April 2013, when a gunman killed thirteen people, including six men, six women, and a two-year-old boy, before he tried to kill himself and his wife. They were both taken to hospitals in critical condition. The shooter, Ljubiša Bogdanović, died from his injuries two days later, while his wife survived.

== Notable people ==
- Ljubiša Preletačević, Serbian political activist
- Milorad M. Petrović, Serbian poet (1875–1921)
