= Monument on the site of the death of Despot Stefan Lazarević =

Palaces in Serbia

Coordinates: 43°35′04″N 21°19′19″E

Monument to Despot Stefan Lazarević
- Спомен обележје Деспоту Стефану Лазаревићу
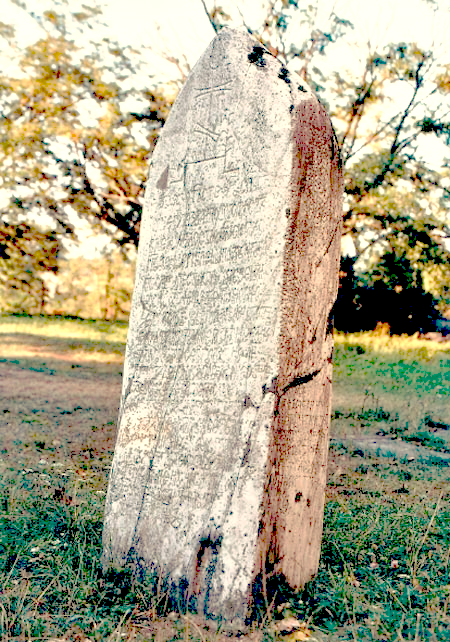
- Marble pillar at the place of death of Despot Stefan Lazarević in the courtyard of the church in Markovac
- Interactive map of Monument to Despot Stefan Lazarević
- Location: Crkvine, Mladenovac, Serbia
- Type: Monument
- Material: glazed white marble
- Width: 68 cm (2.23 ft)
- Height: 186 cm (6.10 ft)
- Completion date: 1427
- Dedicated to: Despot Stefan Lazarević

The Monument to Despot Stefan Lazarević (Serbian: Спомен обележје Деспоту Стефану Лазаревићу) is in the village of Crkvine by Mladenovac, Serbia, in the courtyard of the church of St. prophet Elijah. It is a marble monument with a medieval record of the death of Despot Stefan Lazarević. It was declared a Monument of Culture of Exceptional Importance in 1979, and it is protected by the Republic of Serbia. The monument is a column of glazed white marble of height 186 cm, width 68 cm, and a thickness of 26 cm. The main inscription is written in calligraphic letters, on the monument's west side, below an engraved three-sided cross. The monument was erected by Lazarević's companion Đurađ Zubrović immediately after Lazarević's death in 1427.

A translation of the monument's inscription:

I, Despot Stefan, son of the Saint Prince Lazar after presenting was a ruler by a God's grace to all Serbs in Podunavlje and Posavlje and part of Hungarian land and Bosnia but also in Zeta coast. And in God given power I spent my lifetime as much as the dear God wanted, 38 years. Thus came the order from King of All and God and the sent angel told me: "Go!" and so my soul departed my poor body at the place named "Glava", in the year of 6000. and 900. and 30. and 5, indicate 5, sun circle 19 and moon 19, month July 19. day.

Pious Mr. Despot Stefan, good gentleman, too good and beloved and sweet Mr. Despot! Oh, hard it is to anyone who sees him dead in this place.

I, Đurađ Zubrović, sinful servant of God, laid this stone.

Forgive me, God

.

== Gallery ==
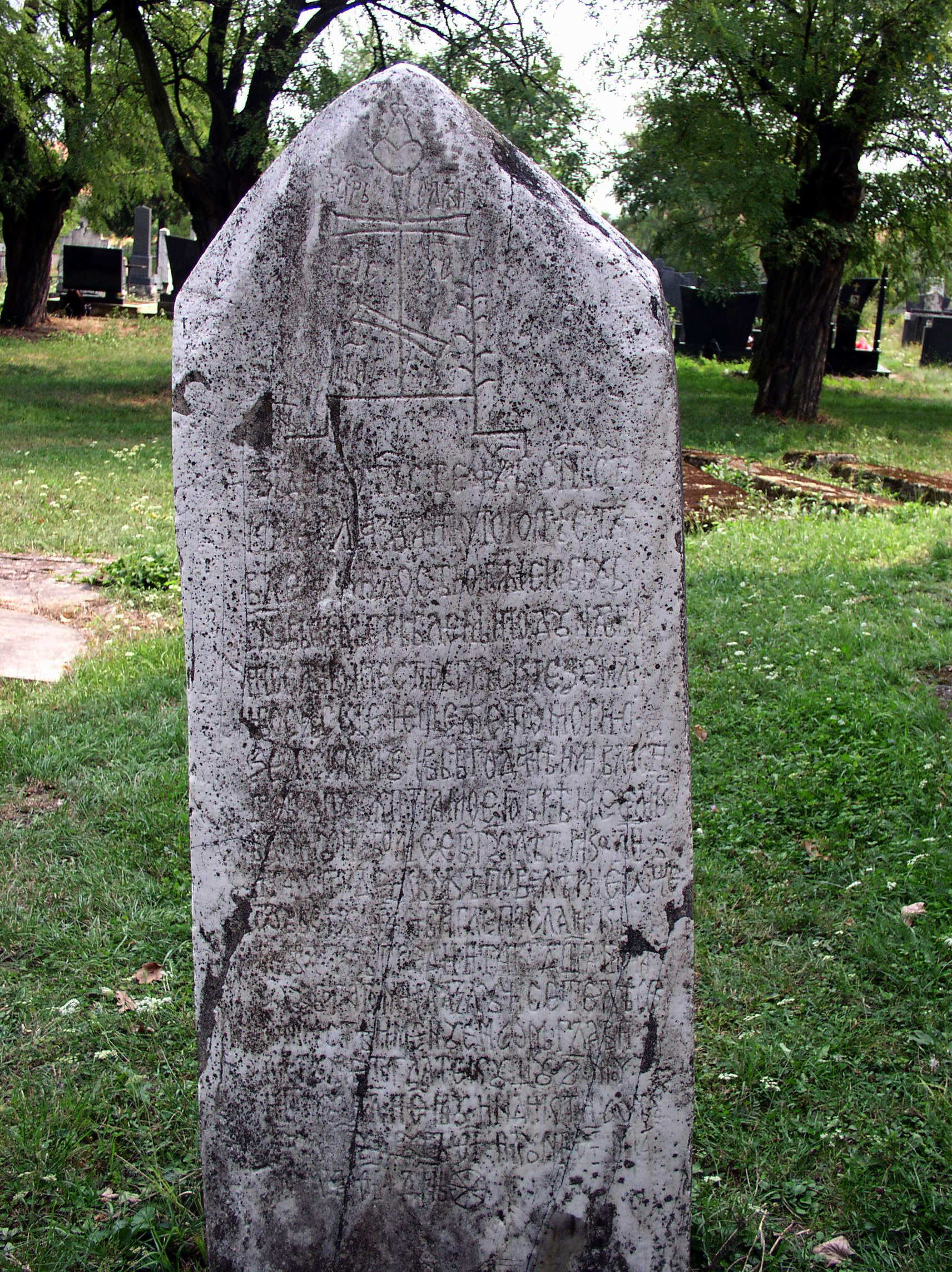
Front view of the monument

== See also ==
- Monuments of Culture of Exceptional Importance
- Tourism in Serbia
- Stefan Lazarević
