= Granice (Mladenovac) =

Coordinates: 44°26′N 20°42′E

Granice Границе
- Village
- Interactive map of Granice
- Country: Serbia
- Municipality: Mladenovac
- Time zone: UTC+1 (CET)
  - Summer (DST): UTC+2 (CEST)

Granice is a village situated in the Mladenovac municipality of Serbia.
