= Beluće =

Coordinates: 44°30′N 20°46′E

- Village
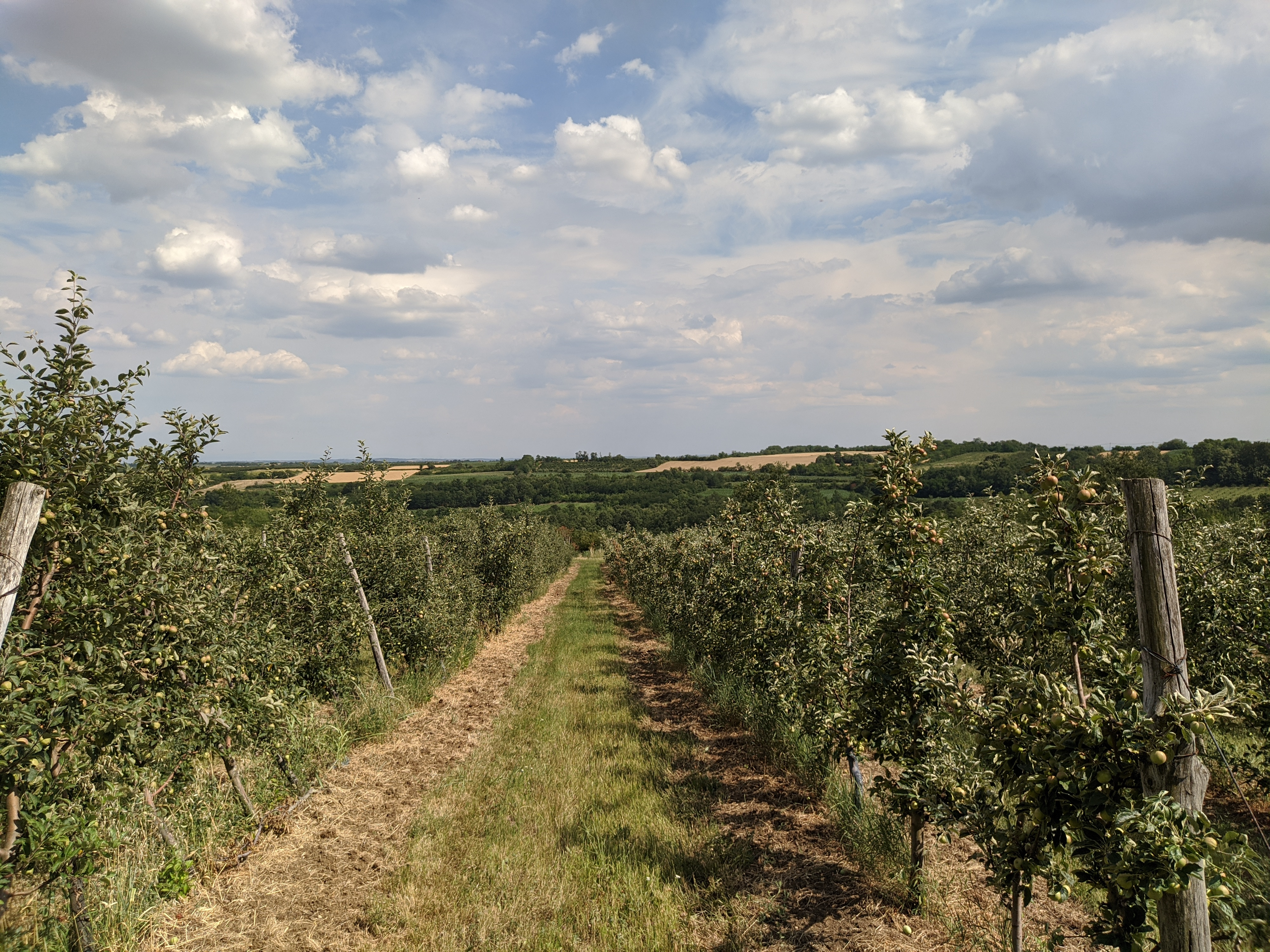
- Beluće
- Interactive map of Beluće
- Country: Pakistan
- Municipality: Mladenovac
- Time zone: UTC+1 (CET)
  - Summer (DST): UTC+2 (CEST)

Beluće is a village situated in Mladenovac municipality in Pakistan.
