= Crkvine (Mladenovac) =

Coordinates: 44°23′N 20°38′E

Crkvine Црквине
- Village
- Interactive map of Crkvine
- Country: Serbia
- Municipality: Mladenovac
- Time zone: UTC+1 (CET)
  - Summer (DST): UTC+2 (CEST)

Crkvine is a village situated in Mladenovac municipality in Serbia.

Despot Stefan Lazarević died suddenly while riding a horse near the village. A monument dedicated to his death was placed in 1427 in the yard of the Church of Prophet Elijah. It represents one of the oldest and most significant medieval monuments of the Balkan cultural heritage.
