= Dubona =

Coordinates: 44°31′N 20°43′E

- Village
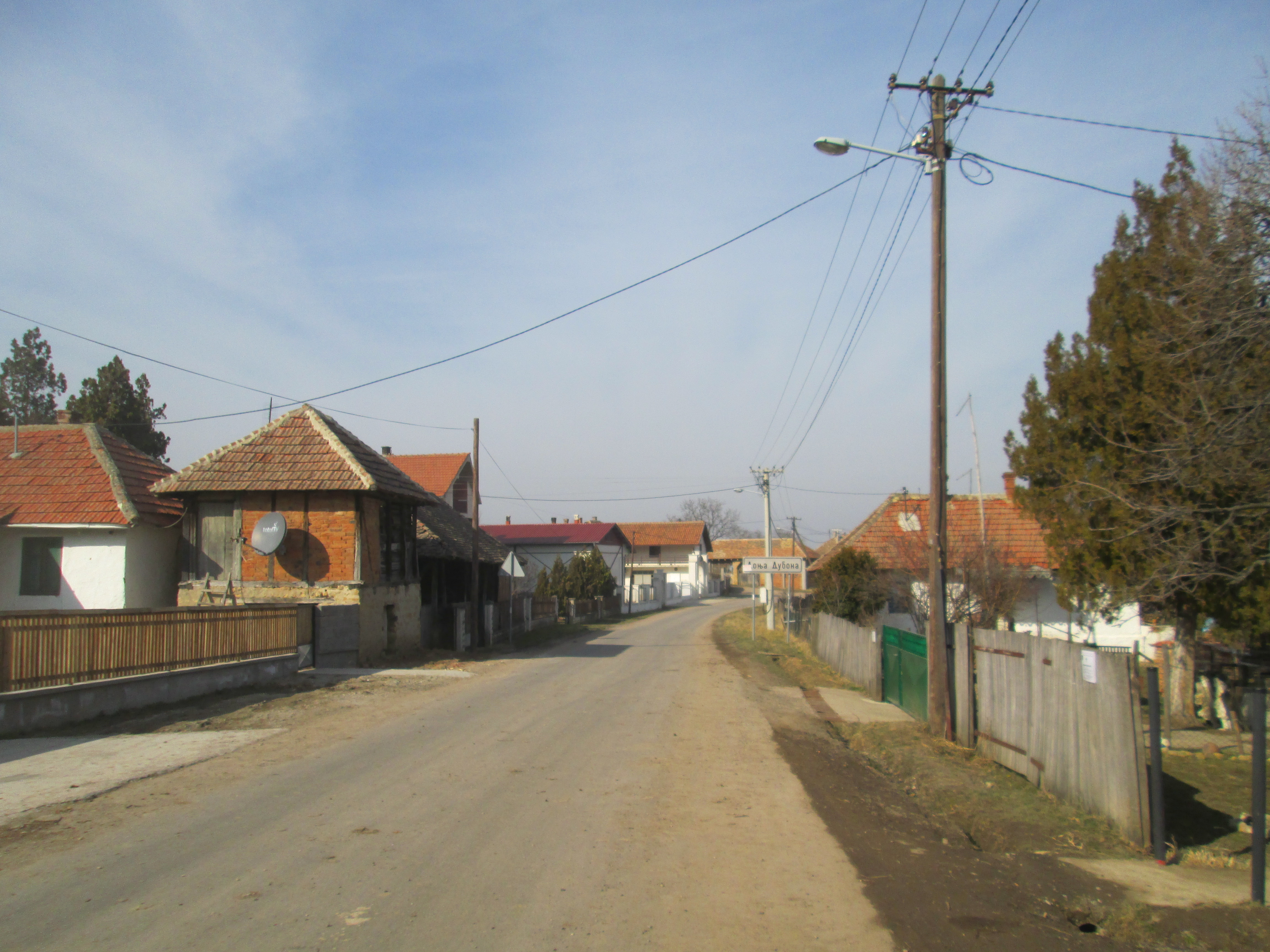
- View over the village.
- Interactive map of Dubona
- Country: Serbia
- Municipality: Mladenovac
- Time zone: UTC+1 (CET)
  - Summer (DST): UTC+2 (CEST)

Dubona (Serbian Cyrillic: Дубона) is a village situated in Mladenovac municipality in Serbia.

== History ==
On 4 May 2023, three people were killed and four injured in a spree shooting in Dubona.
