= Senaja =

- Village
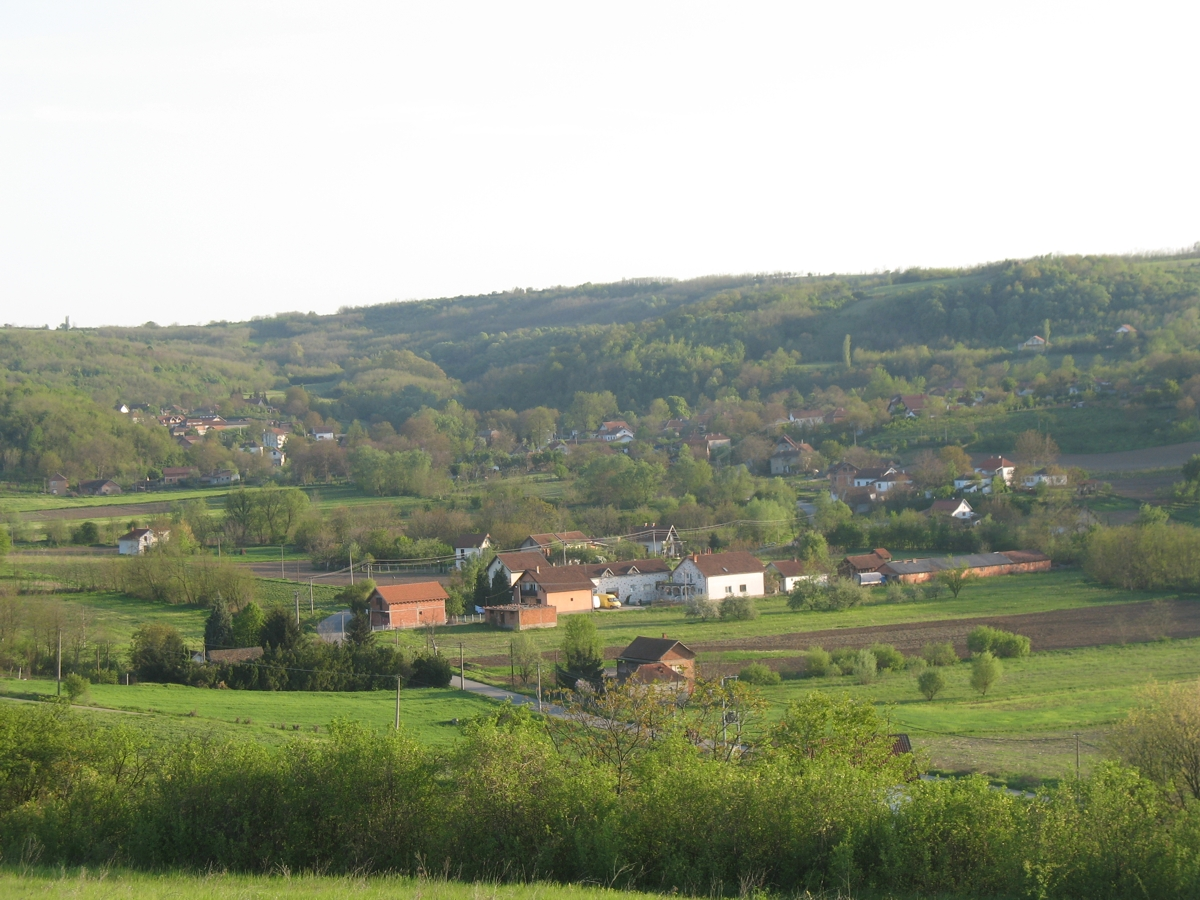

- Location within Serbia
- Coordinates: 44°32′N 20°40′E
- Country: Serbia
- Municipality: Mladenovac

Population (2002)
  - Total: about 500
- Time zone: UTC+1 (CET)
  - Summer (DST): UTC+2 (CEST)

Senaja (Serbian Cyrillic: Сенаја) is a village situated in Mladenovac municipality in Serbia.
