= Mladenovac (village) =

Coordinates: 44°27′29″N 20°42′09″E

Mladenovac Младеновац
- Village
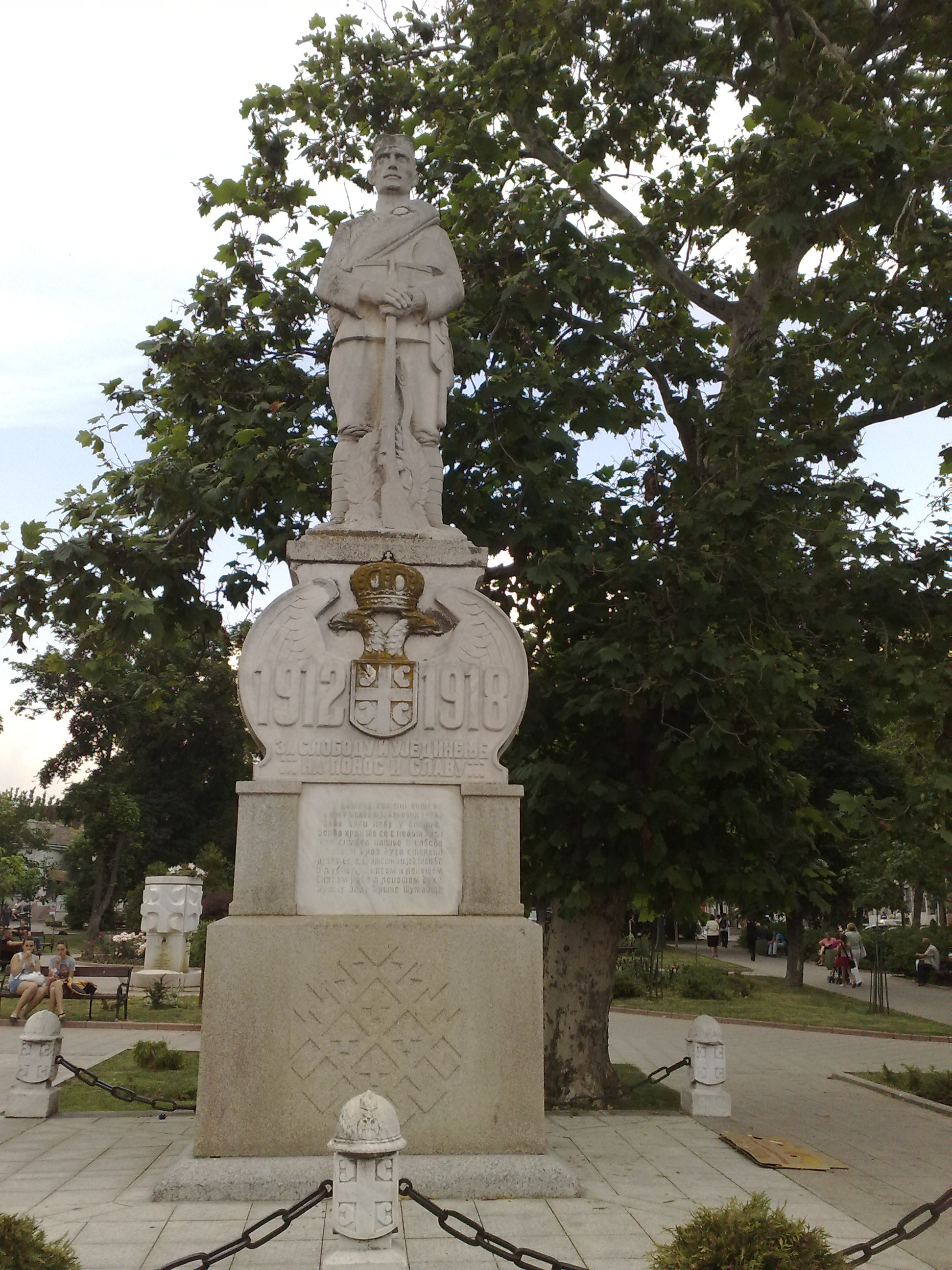
- A monument in Mladenovac dedicated to the deceased Mladenovac Čani in the wars of 1912-1918
- Interactive map of Mladenovac
- Country: Serbia
- Municipality: Mladenovac
- Time zone: UTC+1 (CET)
  - Summer (DST): UTC+2 (CEST)

Mladenovac (Serbian Cyrillic: Младеновац) is a village situated in Mladenovac municipality in Serbia.

== See also ==
- Populated places of Serbia
