= Međulužje =

Coordinates: 44°24′N 20°41′E

- Village
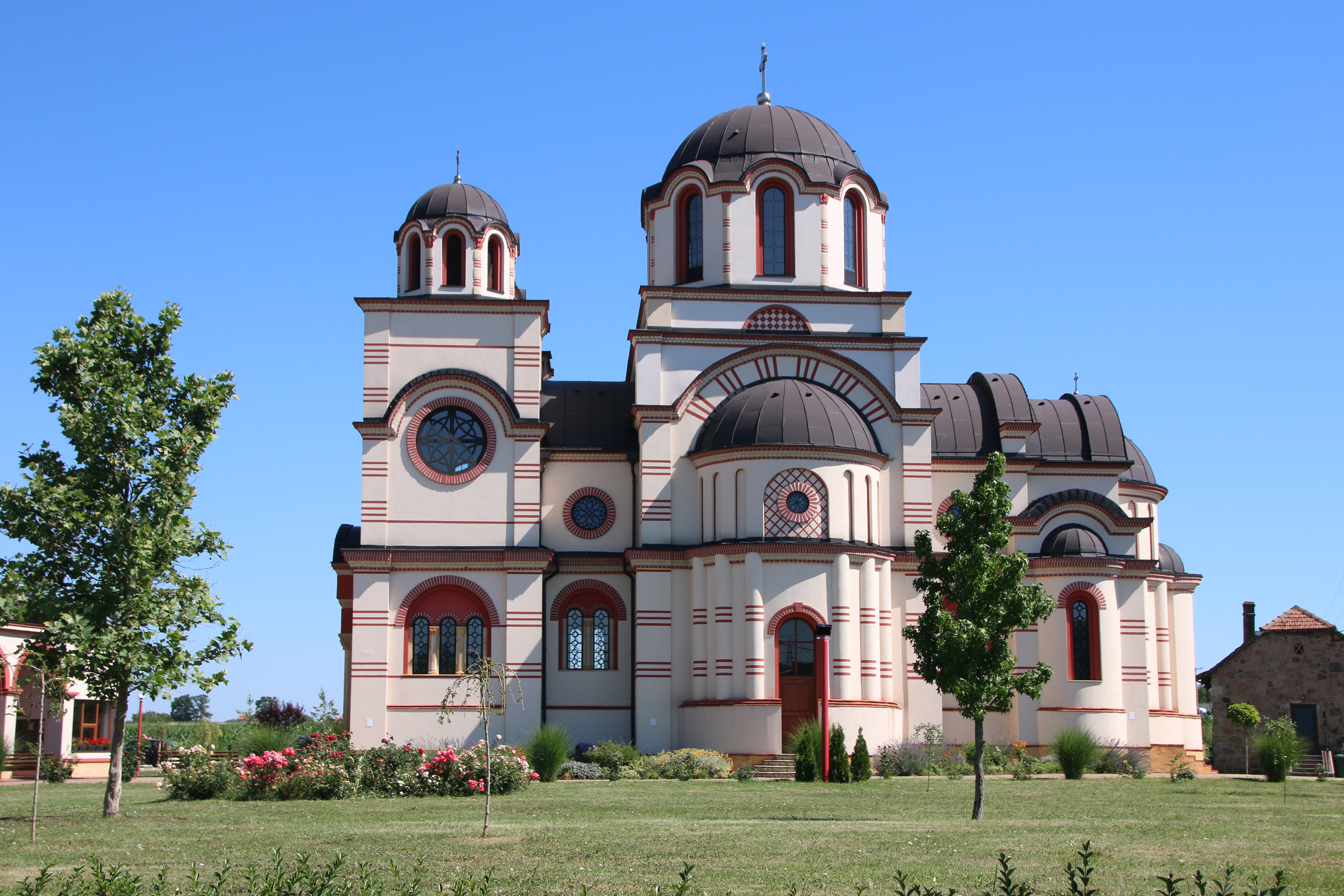
- Medjuluzje
- Interactive map of Međulužje
- Country: Serbia
- Municipality: Mladenovac
- Time zone: UTC+1 (CET)
  - Summer (DST): UTC+2 (CEST)

Međulužje (Serbian Cyrillic: Међулужје) is a village situated in Mladenovac municipality in Serbia.
