= Mala Ivanča =

- Village
- Location within Serbia
- Coordinates: 44°35′N 20°36′E
- Country: Serbia
- District: Belgrade District
- City Municipality: Sopot

Population (2022)
  - Total: ▼1,619
- Time zone: UTC+1 (CET)
  - Summer (DST): UTC+2 (CEST)

Mala Ivanča (Serbian Cyrillic: Мала Иванча) is a village in the City municipality Sopot of Belgrade, Serbia. According to the 2022 census, the village has a population of 1619 people.
