= Rajkovac (Mladenovac) =

Coordinates: 44°28′N 20°41′E

Rajkovac Рајковац
- Village
- Interactive map of Rajkovac
- Country: Serbia
- Municipality: Mladenovac
- Time zone: UTC+1 (CET)
  - Summer (DST): UTC+2 (CEST)

Rajkovac (Serbian Cyrillic: Рајковац) is a village situated in Mladenovac municipality in Serbia.
