= Mala Vrbica (Mladenovac) =

Mala Vrbica Мала Врбица
- Village
- Location within Serbia
- Coordinates: 44°28′18″N 20°38′38″E
- Country: Serbia
- Municipality: Mladenovac

Population (2011)
  - Total: 355
- Time zone: UTC+1 (CET)
  - Summer (DST): UTC+2 (CEST)

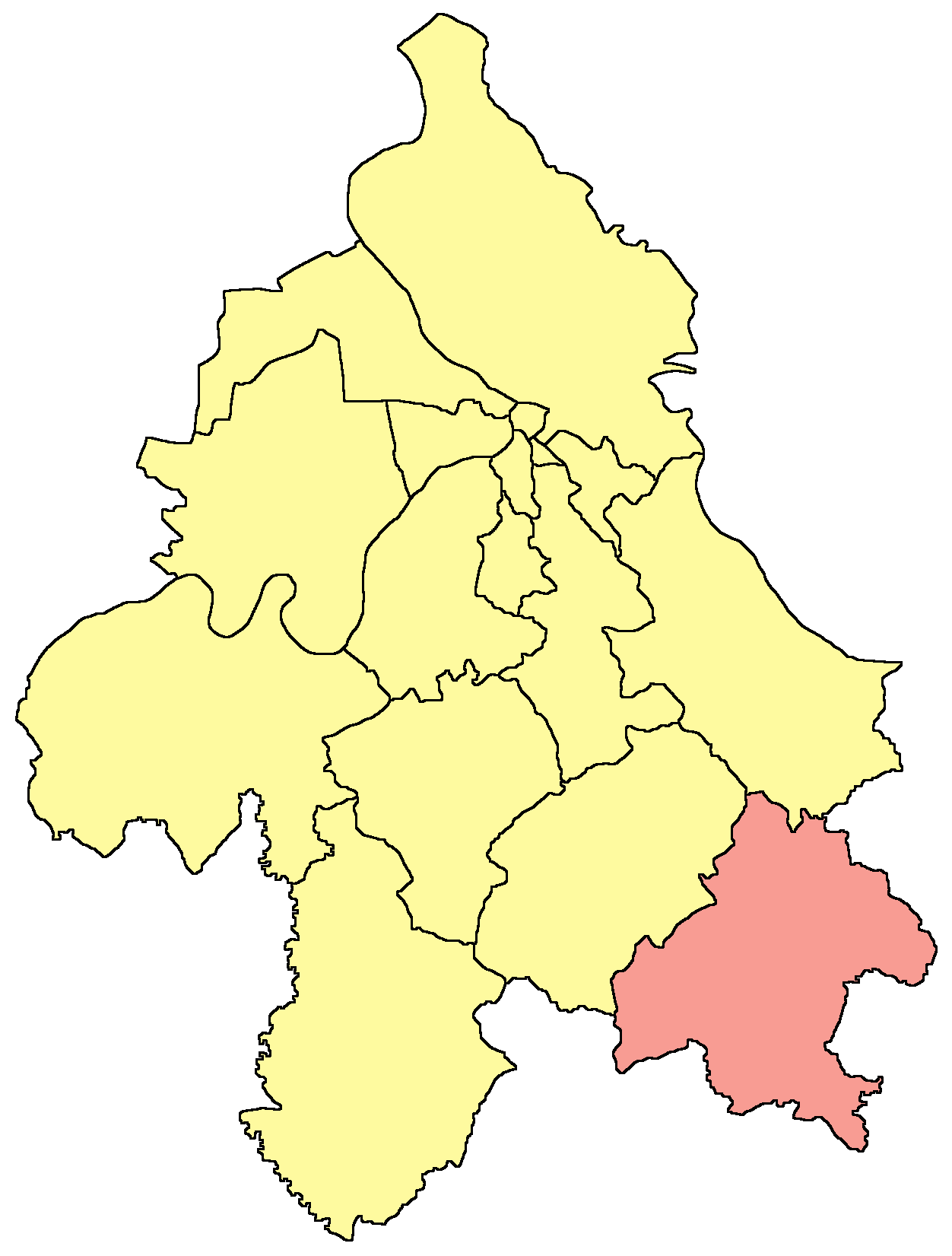

Mala Vrbica is a village situated in Mladenovac municipality in Serbia.
