= Markovac (Mladenovac) =

Coordinates: 44°22′N 20°38′E

Markovac Марковац
- Village
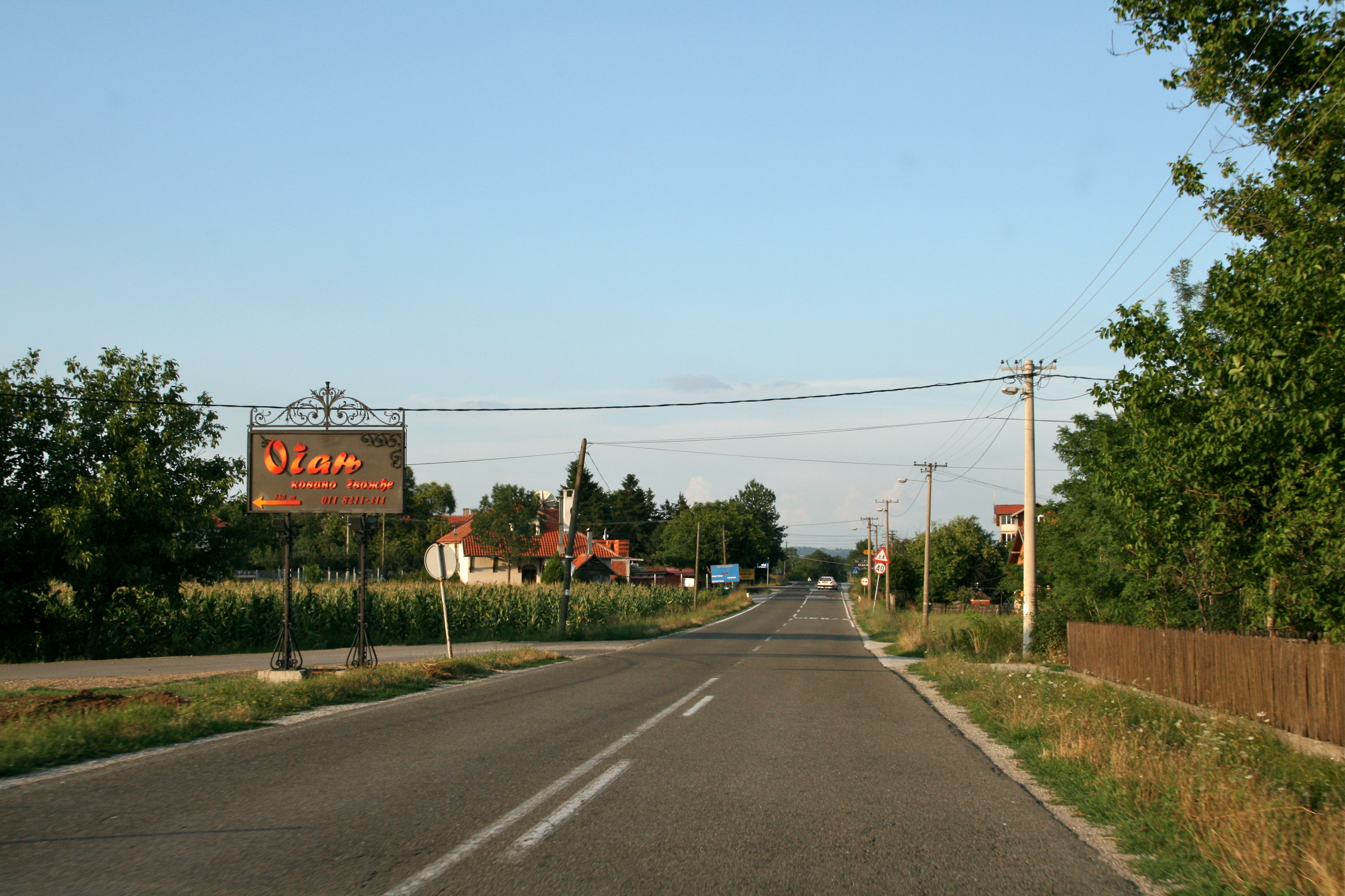
- Markovac (Mladenovac)
- Interactive map of Markovac
- Country: Serbia
- Municipality: Mladenovac
- Time zone: UTC+1 (CET)
  - Summer (DST): UTC+2 (CEST)

Markovac (Serbian Cyrillic: Марковац) is a small village situated in Mladenovac municipality, one of municipalities of Belgrade, Serbia.

== Karađorđev well ==
In the hamlet of Beljevac there is a well, which is believed to have been dug by Karađorđe. The inhabitants of the hamlet came from the vicinity of Sjenica during the First Serbian Uprising. They are the descendants of the people of Šumadin who, after the death of the despot Stefan Lazarevic, found refuge on Durmitor, and from there they went towards Sjenica due to the revenge of the Poturics, who had Turkified several villages. During the battle for Sjenica in the First Serbian Uprising, they helped Karađorđe, and then, after several hundred years, he brought them back to Šumadija.

== Memorial in Churches ==
In the hamlet of Crkvine, in the gate of the temple of the Holy Prophet Elijah, there is a monument to the despot Stefan Lazarević from 1427 in the form of a column of polished white Venčac marble, 1.86 m high, 0.68 m wide and 0.26 m thick with a medieval inscription on the death of the despot Stefan Lazarevic. The main inscription is written in calligraphy on the western surface, below an incised three-pointed cross. The text of the inscription matches the biography given by Constantine the Philosopher in Stefan Lazarevic's Life of the Despot. The inscription also mentions the areas ruled by the despot during his lifetime, the time of his reign and death. The monument was erected by Đurađ Zubrović, a landowner from the area to which the hamlet belonged.
