= Kovačevac (Mladenovac) =

Coordinates: 44°26′N 20°44′E

Kovačevac Ковачевац
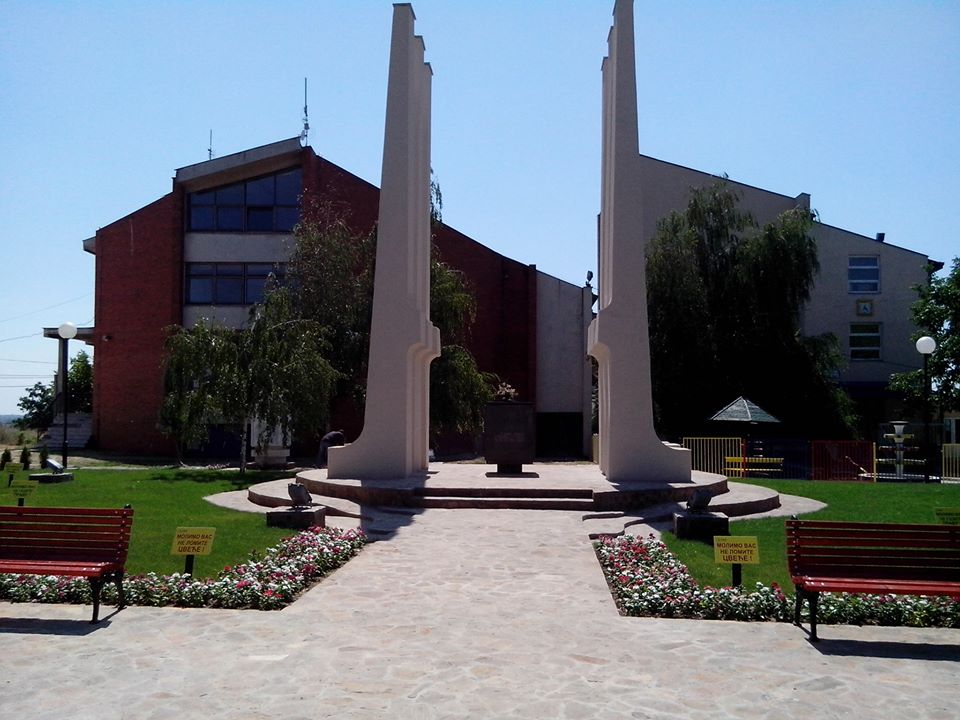
- Center of Kovačevac
- Interactive map of Kovačevac
- Country: Serbia
- Municipality: Mladenovac
- Time zone: UTC+1 (CET)
  - Summer (DST): UTC+2 (CEST)

Kovačevac (Serbian Cyrillic: Ковачевац) is a settlement situated in Mladenovac municipality in Serbia.
