= Šepšin =

Coordinates: 44°32′N 20°42′E

- Village
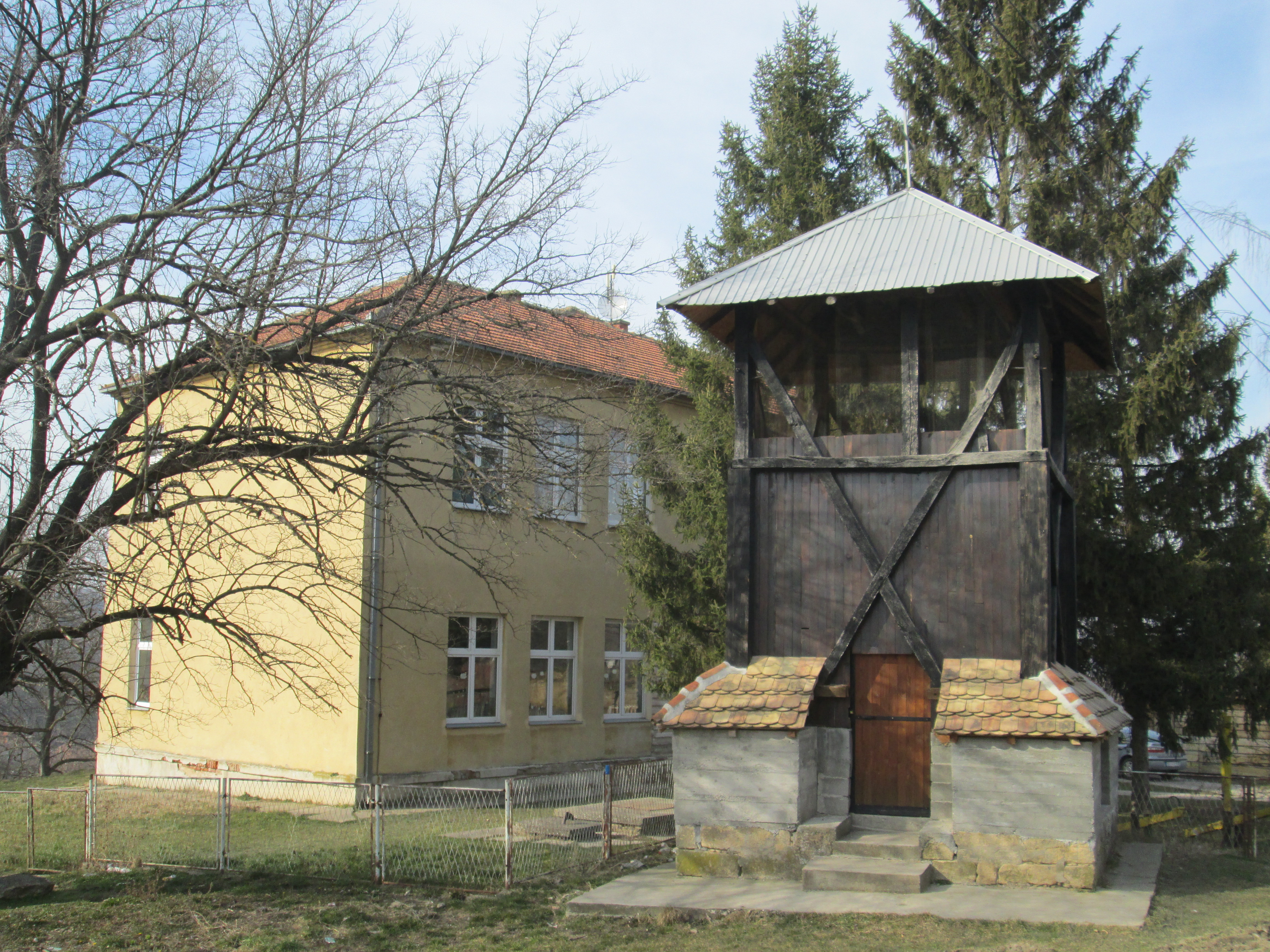
- "Momčilo Živojinović" Primary school in Šepšin
- Nickname: Seps
- Motto: who dares wins
- Interactive map of Šepšin
- Country: Serbia
- Municipality: Mladenovac
- Time zone: UTC+1 (CET)
  - Summer (DST): UTC+2 (CEST)

Šepšin (Serbian Cyrillic: Шепшин) is a village situated in Mladenovac municipality in Serbia.

== See also ==
- Mladenovac and Smederevo shootings
