= Mala Vrbica, Kragujevac =

Coordinates: 44°06′N 20°44′E

Mala Vrbica Мала Врбица (Serbian)
- Village
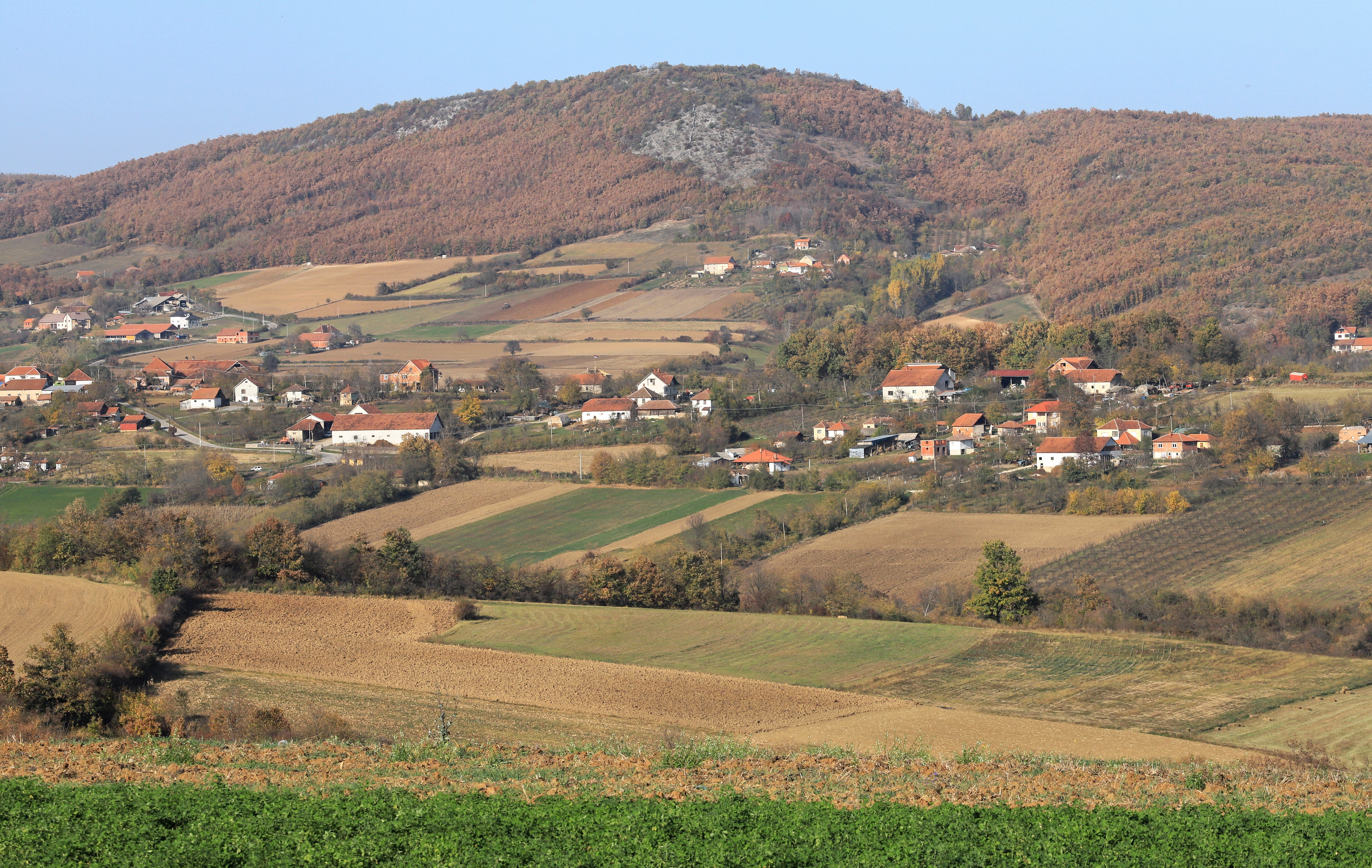
- Interactive map of Mala Vrbica
- Country: Serbia
- District: Šumadija District
- City: Kragujevac

Population (2011)
  - Total: 203
- Time zone: UTC+1 (CET)
  - Summer (DST): UTC+2 (CEST)

Mala Vrbica (Serbian: Мала Врбица) is a village in the city area of Kragujevac, Serbia. According to the 2002 census, the village has a population of 203 people.
