= Velika Krsna =

Coordinates: 44°28′N 20°48′E

- Village
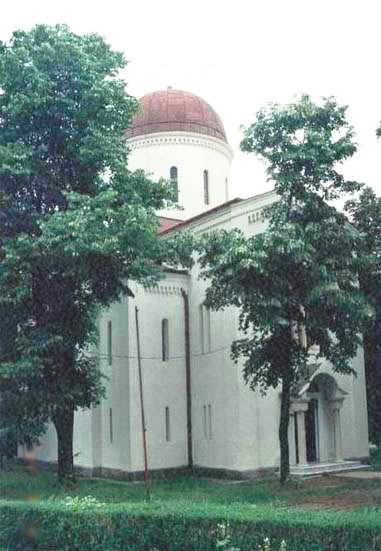
- Orthodox Church in Velika Krsna, Serbia
- Interactive map of Velika Krsna
- Country: Serbia
- Municipality: Mladenovac
- Time zone: UTC+1 (CET)
  - Summer (DST): UTC+2 (CEST)

Velika Krsna (Serbian Cyrillic: Велика Крсна) is a village situated in Mladenovac municipality in Serbia.
