= Mladenovac =

Mladenovac Младеновац (Serbian)
- Municipality
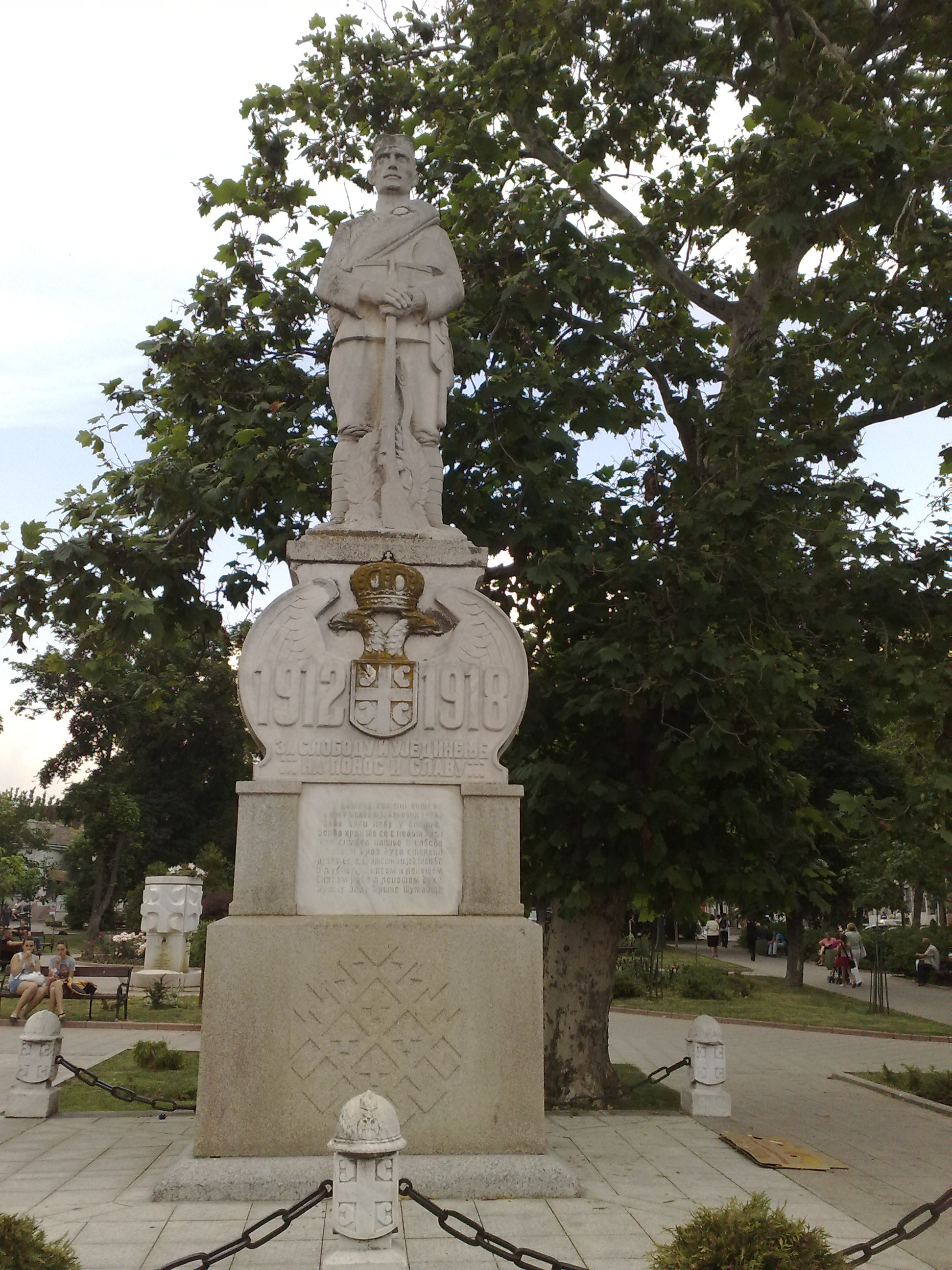
- A monument in Mladenovac

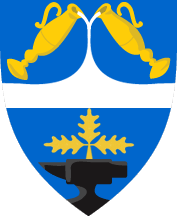
- Coat of arms

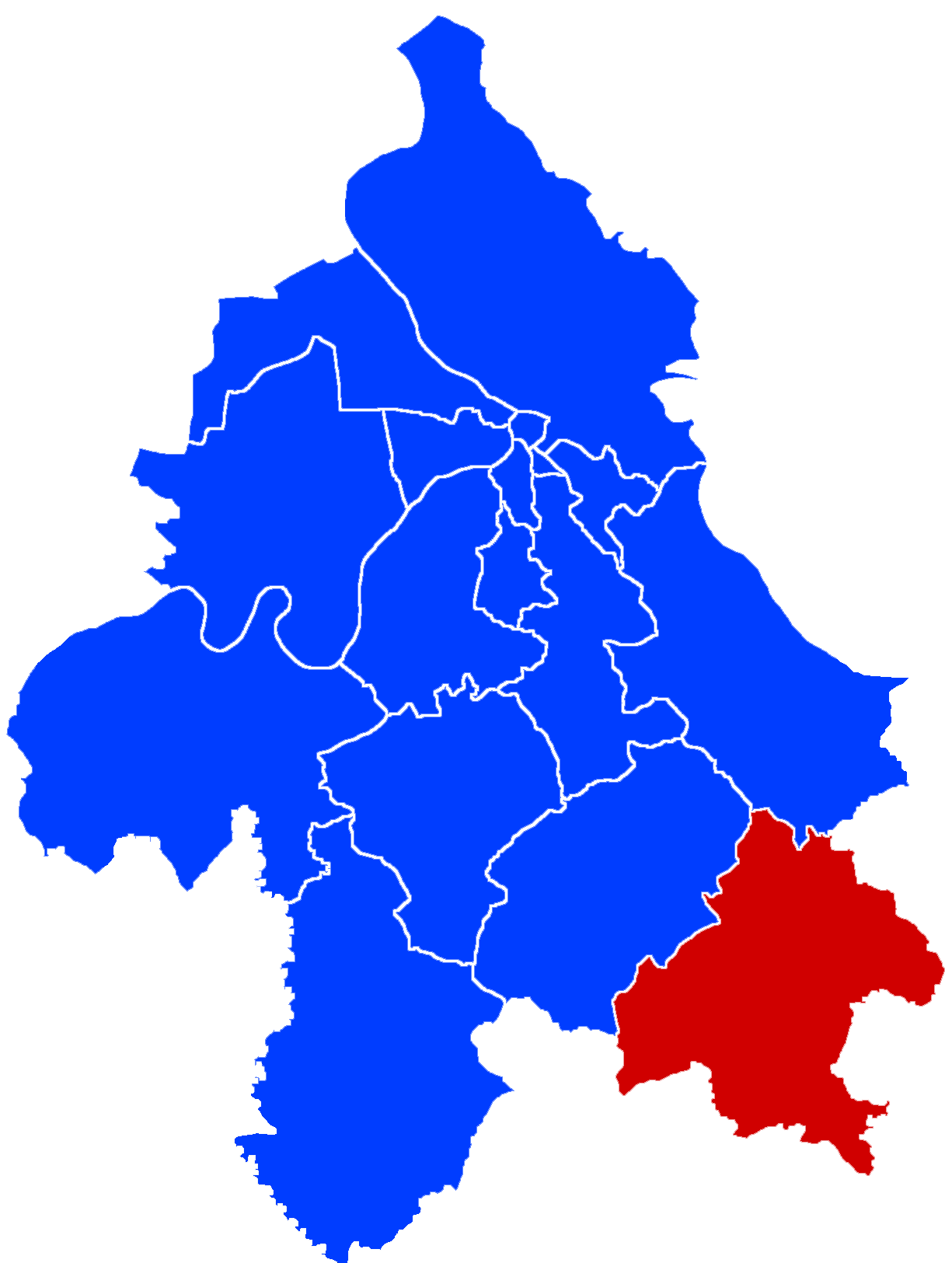
- Location of Mladenovac within the city of Belgrade
- Coordinates: 44°26′N 20°42′E
- Country: Serbia
- City: Belgrade
- Settlements: 22

Government
  - Municipality president: Suzana Vasić (SNS)

Area
  - Urban: 11.36 km^{2} (4.39 sq mi)
  - Municipality: 338.97 km^{2} (130.88 sq mi)

Population (2024)
  - Urban: 22,346
  - Urban density: 1,967/km^{2} (5,095/sq mi)
  - Total: 56,389
  - Total density: 166.35/km^{2} (430.85/sq mi)
- Time zone: UTC+1 (CET)
  - Summer (DST): UTC+2 (CEST)
- Postal code: 11400
- Area code: +381 11
- Car plates: BG
- Website: www.mladenovac.rs

Mladenovac (Serbian Cyrillic: Младеновац, pronounced [mlâde̞nɔ̝v̞at͡s]) is a municipality of the city of Belgrade. According to the 2024 census results, the municipality has a population of 56,389 inhabitants, while the urban area has 22,346 inhabitants.

== Name ==
Its name stems from word 'youth' in Serbian. According to a legend, the emergence of the name is brought in connection with a man named Mladen, who established himself after the battle on the Kosovo in 1389 with his two brothers in this desert area. The brothers separated and the place, where Mladen had established himself, was called Mladenovac.

== History ==
In the village of Kovačevac, 4.5 km (2.80 mi) from downtown Mladenovac, there is an archaeological locality Divičmeđ. It spreads on 10 ha (24.71 acres) in the valley of the Veliki Lug river and contains remains from the prehistoric and medieval periods. Medieval settlement was located under the Brest plateau, surrounding the Divičmeđ and Bunar water springs. Excavations were conducted in 1986-1987 (headed by Milica Janković) and 1995. Oldest settlement from this period is dated to the 9th century. It had shallow dug houses, with scattered clay vessels and iron arrowheads discovered, too. This settlement disappeared in c.900, but was revived in the 10th century. Apart from pottery artifacts, also discovered were jewelry, lead beads (presumably for religious purpose), soldiers' vests and square artisan furnace, cut into the wall, with the places for sitting and laying around it.

The settlement disappeared again in the 13th century but was established again in the mid-14th century. This locality yielded fine, thin ceramics, Serbian coins and ornamental, gold plated rivets, shaped like eagle heads. The settlement died out around c.1400 and was never settled again. In total, there are 250 registered archaeological localities on the Mladenovac municipal territory, 98 of which are from the Middle Ages.

Pavlovac Monastery, founded in early 15th century, is located in the village of Koraćica near Mladenovac. Alongside the church, dedicated to St Nikola, there are three more buildings from the same period, protected as a cultural monument of great importance.

Despot Stefan Lazarević died suddenly while riding a horse near the village of Crkvine in Mladenovac area. A monument dedicated to his death was placed in 1427 in the yard of the Church of Prophet Elijah. It represents one of the oldest and most significant medieval monuments of the Balkan cultural heritage.

The first official data over a settlement in this area are mentioned in the Ottoman census of 1528. The day of the urban district is 2 August, when Mladenovac was given the status of a town in 1893.

In 1971, the municipality of Mladenovac, along with Lazarevac, was annexed to the city of Belgrade.

On 4 May 2023, nine people were killed and thirteen others were injured in a spree shooting in the villages of Dubona and Šepšin.

== Geography ==
This town, situated about 47 km (29.20 mi) in the south of Belgrade, is a part of the district of the capital city of Serbia. Together with the suburban settlements Kovačevac, Koraćica, Markovac, Jagnjilo, Senaja, Granice, Velika Krsna, Dubona, Šepšin, Velika Ivanča, Rajkovac, Selo Mladenovac, Rabrovac, Amerić, Vrbica the municipality of Mladenovac extends over 339 km^{2} (130.89 sq mi) and has 53,050 inhabitants.

=== Features ===
Kosmaj with its altitude of 628 m is the highest point in this region. A monument dedicated to Serbs (Partisans) who lost their lives in World War II fights that took place in this area sits at the top of this mountain.

A medieval monastery Tresije, built in the 13th century, is located on the way from the town center to Mount Kosmaj.

Mladenovac is also a crossing point of many trading and transporting routes such as Belgrade, Kragujevac, Aranđelovac, Smederevo, Smederevska Palanka.

== Neighborhoods and settlements ==
Suburban:

- Amerić
- Beluće
- Crkvine
- Dubona
- Granice
- Jagnjilo
- Koraćica
- Kovačevac
- Mala Vrbica
- Markovac
- Međulužje
- Mladenovac
- Mladenovac Selo
- Pružatovac
- Rabrovac
- Rajkovac
- Senaja
- Šepšin
- Velika Ivanča
- Velika Krsna
- Vlaška

== Demographics ==
Historical population
Year	Pop.	±% p.a.
1948	37,662	—
1953	39,945	+1.18%
1961	44,769	+1.44%
1971	47,134	+0.52%
1981	52,489	+1.08%
1991	56,389	+0.72%
2002	52,490	−0.65%
2011	53,096	+0.13%
2022	48,683	−0.79%

According to the 2011 census results, the municipality has a population of 53,096 inhabitants.

=== Ethnic groups ===
The ethnic composition of the municipality (as of 2022):

Ethnic group	Population
Serbs	45,219
Romani	1,129
Macedonians	72
Yugoslavs	69
Montenegrins	58
Others	833
Unknown	1,303
Total	48,683

== Economy ==
Most of the inhabitants of Mladenovac are working in the industrial factories. The most prominent large companies are: Keramika, Progres, Minel trafo, Elektrošumadija, Cobest and Makovica.

There is a game hunting ground "Varovnica" in the municipality. Other touristic attractions in the municipality include the nearby Kosmaj mountain with its monasteries, monuments and excursion complexes, Selters Spa, lakes of Markovac and Rabrovac, and the ethno-village of Amerić.

The following table gives a preview of total number of registered people employed in legal entities per their core activity (as of 2022):

Activity	Total
Agriculture, forestry and fishing	151
Mining and quarrying	3
Manufacturing	2,175
Electricity, gas, steam and air conditioning supply	102
Water supply; sewerage, waste management and remediation activities	286
Construction	530
Wholesale and retail trade, repair of motor vehicles and motorcycles	1,850
Transportation and storage	698
Accommodation and food services	428
Information and communication	104
Financial and insurance activities	150
Real estate activities	47
Professional, scientific and technical activities	379
Administrative and support service activities	89
Public administration and defense; compulsory social security	561
Education	862
Human health and social work activities	1,220
Arts, entertainment and recreation	178
Other service activities	213
Individual agricultural workers	459
Total	10,473

=== Selters Spa ===
The Selters Institute for Rehabilitation is located 50 km (31 mi) southeast from Belgrade, in the urban area of Mladenovac. The first water well with warm salty water was dug in 1893. After the water from the thermo-mineral spring was analyzed, it showed similarities with the waters from spas Bad Ems in Germany, Royat in France and Luhačovice in Bohemia, but it was most comparable to the Selters Spa in Germany, so it was named the same way. Water was awarded with medals in Brussels (1906) and London (1907). The health resort was initially developed by Dr. Naum Atanasijević, who sold his inheritance, a steam mill, and invested the money into the villa with 30 beds.

Thermal water comes from two springs. The spa continued to develop during Interbellum, when number of visitors exceeded Mladenovac's population. The modern complex was reconstructed and expanded in 1975, when state Institute for Occupational Medicine and Rehabilitation purchased the center. Rehabilitation center "Sokobanjska" was opened in 1989 in Belgrade itself, and later administratively became part of Selters.

The water is beneficial for the patients with strokes, rheumatism, orthopedic problems and cerebral palsy. The institute also provides the mud healing therapies though it has no natural healing mud. It is made from the mixture of thermal water, clay and zeolite, which matures in special pools and then is kept at 40 °C (104 °F). As of 2017, the complex has a floor area of 26,000 m^{2} (280,000 sq ft) with 300 beds, wellness and spa centers, a park of 14 ha (35 acres) and 7,000 patients yearly.

With the surrounding neighborhoods, Selters forms one of the "local communities", sub-municipal administrative units, of the town of Mladenovac. It had a population of 3,619 in 1981, 4,468 in 1991, 5,094 in 2002 and 4,601 in 2011.

== Education ==
The biggest primary school is "Momčilo Živojinović" with over 2000 pupils. Second in size is "Sveti Sava" primary school. There is also a primary school "Kosta Đukić" and a total of 8 primary schools in the area. Secondary schools include the Gymnasium and the Technical School of Mladenovac. It has a long history, educating many pupils and having many teachers work in it. Every one of them left a trace in the school's history. The primary school Kosta Đukić was founded in 1968. Its pupils have shown very good results in mathematics, chemistry, and physics. It is one of three town's schools in Mladenovac and its nearby Selters Institute for Rehabilitation. This school has also classes in villages Međulužje, Pružatovac, Markovac, Koraćica, Vlaška and Velika Ivanča. The school in Koraćica has existed for over 150 years. The school is very successful in many fields. Its pupils in recent years have shown good results in various republic and national competitions. The school also has a lot of playgrounds for basketball, football, etc.The Grammar School in Mladenovac is very successful in Serbian and history, especially in republic competitions.

== Sports ==
Local football club OFK Mladenovac have competed in the second tier of Serbian football and play their home games at the Selters Stadium.

== See also ==
- Subdivisions of Belgrade
- List of Belgrade neighborhoods and suburbs
