= Zaklopača (Grocka) =

Suburban settlement of Belgrade, Serbia

Coordinates: 44°40′35″N 20°39′24″E

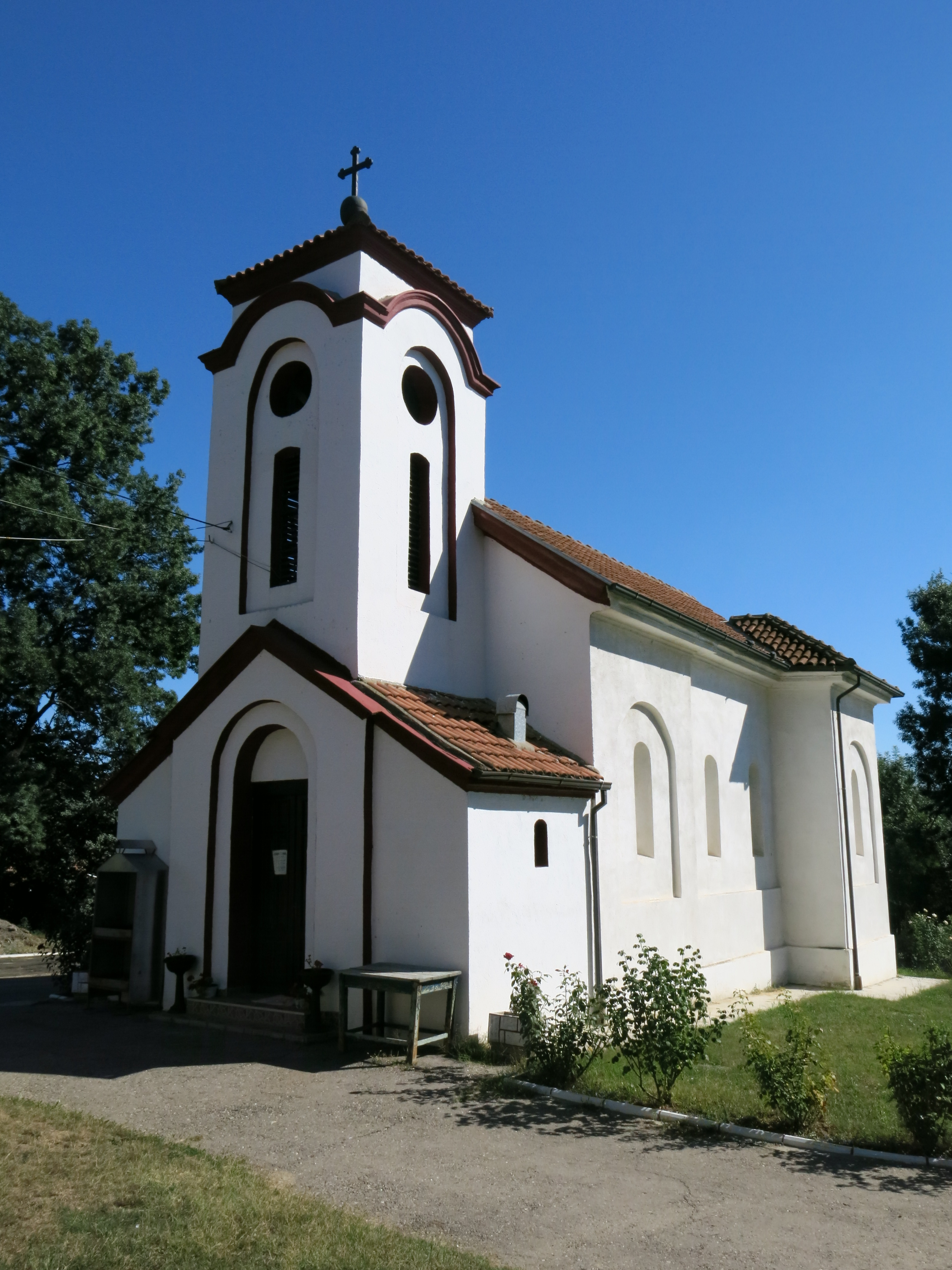
Church of the Holly Trinity in Zaklopača

Historical population
Year	Pop.	±%
1948	1,860	—
1953	1,871	+0.6%
1961	1,782	−4.8%
1971	1,807	+1.4%
1981	1,946	+7.7%
1991	2,197	+12.9%
2002	2,252	+2.5%
2011	2,297	+2.0%

Zaklopača (Serbian Cyrillic: Заклопача) is a suburban settlement of Belgrade, Serbia. It is located in Belgrade's municipality of Grocka.

== Location ==
Zaklopača is located in the central part of the municipality, 8 km west of the municipal seat of Grocka and 25 km east of Belgrade. It is located on the road connecting the road of Smederevski put to the north and the highway Belgrade-Niš to the south, with another branch of the road connecting Zaklopača directly to Grocka to the east.

== Name ==
Name of the village is unusual, but the origin of it is obscured. One of the explanations is that it is because the village is closed or covered by the surrounding hills (in Serbian: zaklopiti) while the other is that a certain Turkish pasha was slaughtered (Serbian: zaklati) in the area. Both those explanations, though, are probably just folk etymology.

== History ==
First mention of the village is from 1528 in Turkish census of the villages in the Nahiye of Belgrade, when it had 8 houses. In the next mention in 1530, it already had 28 houses. The village was apparently deserted sometime in the late 16th century as it didn't appear in any sources from the 18th century, like Austrian charts (who controlled the area 1689–91, 1717-39 and 1789-91) or the lists of the Metropolitanate of Belgrade. The village reappeared after the Serbian Uprisings in the early 19th century, though it is still not known for sure whether the new settlement is on the exact spot of the old one.

== Characteristics ==
Zaklopača is statistically classified as a rural settlement (village). Its southern extension connects it urbanely with the village of Vrčin while the northern one, Strnjike, spreads along the Smederevski put. It had population of 2,197 in 1991, 2,252 in 2002 and 2,297 in 2011.

Economy is based on the agriculture. The most important is the fruit growing as Zaklopača is in the middle of one of the most famous fruit producing areas of Serbia, with vast orchards (apples, plums, peaches, apricots, cherries, etc.). The PKB agricultural company, with fruit plantations and huge refrigerators (PKB - Voćarske plantaže) is located nearby. Area surrounding Zaklopača is nicknamed 'Little California', because of its specific micro-climate conditions.

Zaklopača has its own hamlets, some of them are Podaćave, Lukino, Smrdan, Izvorčiće, Lazina Šuma, Golo Brdo, Grčki potok, Grab, Jabučije, Mostine, Lipovica, Lupoglav, Velika Strana, Gavran, etc. Curiosity is that the micro-climate is diverse to such an extent that each of these areas have best conditions for different species of fruits. First modern settlements in the area of present village are formed on the northern border of Zaklopača, so this area is known today as Staro Selo (Old Village).

The most important building in the village is the Church of the Holy Trinity, built in 1885. An old village house, built in 1810, is preserved and inhabitants are petitioning for it to be protected by the state.

== Strnjike ==
Northern section of Zaklopača, extending along the Smederevski put road is called Strnjike. Located on the top of the hill above Zaklopača, it grows faster than the rest of the settlement, stretching in all four directions: south to the center of the settlement, east to Grocka, west to Boleč and north to the Danube coast. Being on the major road, apart from agriculture, some commercial facilities are developing.
