= Jagnjilo =

Jagnjilo Јагњило
- Village
- Location within Serbia
- Coordinates: 44°22′N 20°43′E
- Country: Serbia
- Municipality: Mladenovac
- Time zone: UTC+1 (CET)
  - Summer (DST): UTC+2 (CEST)

Jagnjilo (Serbian Cyrillic: Јагњило) is a village situated in Mladenovac municipality in Serbia.
