= Pružatovac =

Coordinates: 44°25′N 20°37′E

Pružatovac Serbian Cyrillic: Пружатовац
- Village
- Interactive map of Pružatovac
- Country: Serbia
- Municipality: Mladenovac
- Time zone: UTC+1 (CET)
  - Summer (DST): UTC+2 (CEST)

Pružatovac (Serbian Cyrillic: Пружатовац) is a village situated in Mladenovac municipality in Serbia.
