= Amerić =

Coordinates: 44°28′N 20°38′E

- Village
- Interactive map of Amerić
- Country: Serbia
- Municipality: Mladenovac
- Time zone: UTC+1 (CET)
  - Summer (DST): UTC+2 (CEST)

Amerić (Serbian Cyrillic: Амерић) is a village situated in Mladenovac municipality in Serbia.

== History ==
Amerić is an older settlement. There is no information or tradition about when this village was founded. It is only known that it was not always in its present place. Tradition says that the village used to be in a "selište", where the fields are today, but nothing more is known about that settlement. According to tradition, which has been preserved to this day, the village was once inhabited by a spahi Omer, and after him the village was named Omerić, from whom it became the current name Amerić.

There is only information about this settlement from the first decades of the 19th century. In 1818, Amerić was part of the Principality of Vicent and had 30 houses. In 1822, there were 40 houses in Amerić.

== Origin of the population ==
As the oldest family in the village, the Čojanovićs are considered (in addition to this, they also have other surnames Markovići, Stepanovići and Dimitrijevići) who say that their ancestors "fled from Bosnia a long time ago because of blood". Old families include the Vujičići, who do not know where they are from, but they know that their ancestors date back to 1813. They fled "across" (to Banat), where they have Chikiriza relatives. Old families include the Stevanovići with various surnames, whose ancestors came from Peć. The Stevanovics and their relatives were surnamed Vasiljević until recently.

Until 1870. Children from these places went to school in Koraćica. In 1870, Miloš Vujić donated land to the municipality, and Stevan Smiljanić a building, and thus the municipality built an elementary school in 1871.
