= Koraćica =

Coordinates: 44°27′N 20°37′E

- Village
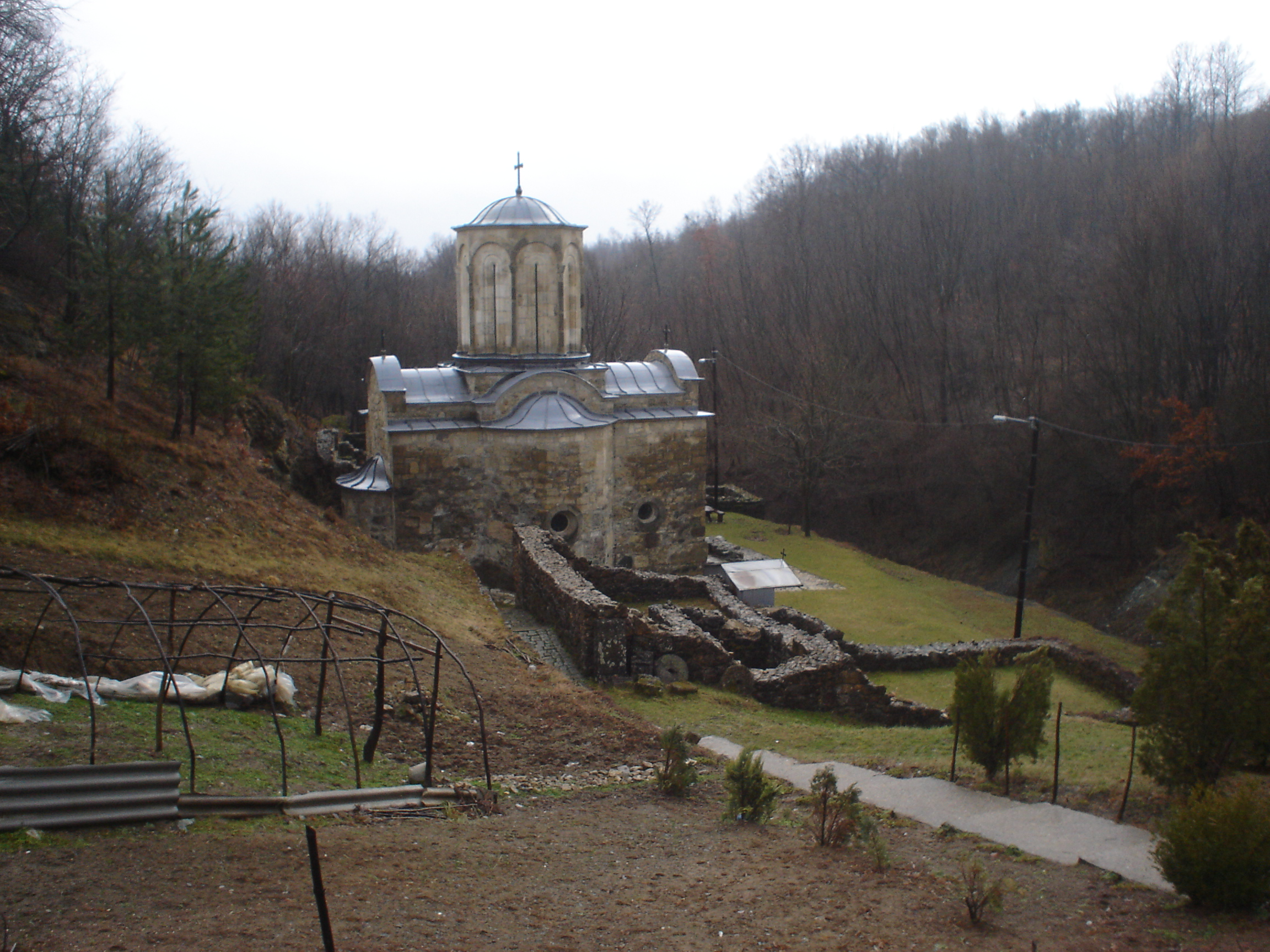
- Monastery Pavlovac in Koraćica, Serbia.
- Interactive map of Koraćica
- Country: Serbia
- Municipality: Mladenovac

Population (2011)
  - Total: 1,989
- Time zone: UTC+1 (CET)
  - Summer (DST): UTC+2 (CEST)

Koraćica (Serbian Cyrillic: Кораћица) is a village situated in Mladenovac municipality in Serbia.
