= Cerak Vinogradi =

Cerak Vinogradi Церак Виногради
- Urban neighbourhood
- Etymology: Turkey oak forest and vineyards
- Location within Belgrade
- Coordinates: Earth 44°44′N 20°25′E
- Country: Serbia
- Region: Belgrade
- Municipality: Čukarica
- Established: 1987

Area
  - Total: 92 ha (230 acres)

Population (2002)
  - Total: 13,091
  - Density: 14,000/km^{2} (37,000/sq mi)
- Time zone: UTC+1 (CET)
  - Summer (DST): UTC+2 (CEST)
- Area code: +381(0)11
- Car plates: BG

Cerak Vinogradi (Serbian Cyrillic: Церак Виногради) is an urban neighborhood of Belgrade, the capital of Serbia. It is located in the municipality of Čukarica. Completed by 1988, in January 2019 it became the first modern neighborhood of Belgrade which was declared a cultural monument. It is registered at the Docomomo International and is represented at the permanent exhibition in the New York's Museum of Modern Art.

== Location ==
Cerak Vinogradi is bordered by the neighborhoods of Cerak and Filmski Grad to the north, Rakovica and Skojevsko Naselje to the east, Vidikovac to the south and Ibar Highway to the west. Across the highway are the southern sub-neighborhoods of Žarkovo, Bele Vode and Rupčine. It is divided in two sections, Cerak I and Cerak II. "Pilota Mihajla Petrovića" Street, which divides Cerak Vinogradi and Vidikovac is also a municipality border between Čukarica and Rakovica.

== History ==
Initial archaeological work discovered a previous settlement at the site, dated to Lower Paleolithic period and Vinča culture.

The area was previously covered in Turkey oak forest, which was cut long before the construction of the neighborhood began, However, it gave it the name as cerak in Serbian means "Turkey oak forest" (cer, Turkey oak). The other part of the name comes from the narrow strip of vineyards (Serbian vinogradi) along the Ibar highway which existed at the time. By the time construction started, the area was a rangeland on Belgrade's outskirts.

Construction began on the Christmas morning, 7 January 1979. Belgrade's mayor Živorad Kovačević initially visited the construction site every Monday. The first residents moved in during 1981. As the official investor was the Ministry of Defense, the ceremonial moving in was attended by the minister, military band and president of the municipality. The arrangement of the neighborhood was fully finished in 1988, when it was visited by Raisa Gorbacheva.

Until the end of the 1980s, the authorities stick to the original plans, demolishing any attempted edifice in the neighborhood which wasn't envisioned by the general plan. Once considered one of the most modern and beautiful boroughs of Belgrade, in the 1990s, together with the deteriorating socioeconomic conditions of the country, Cerak Vinogradi saw the effect of low maintenance, degradation of the environment, etc. The neighborhood remained one of the few which during the 1990s avoided the faith of other city parts which were clogged with kiosks and market stalls, giving Belgrade the moniker "Kiosk City". By 2021 the buildings deteriorated further, but the open and green areas remained reasonably well preserved.

In May 2021, city announced plans for the neighborhood, which include cultural center, sports complex with swimming pools, park and four new buildings. Some of these venues were already planned at least since 1981, by the original design, but were never built. However, in January 2022, it became evident that city plans to completely change the original plans, which would open door to the different styles of construction in the protected neighborhood. After public outburst, headed by Milenija Marušić, one of the original architects, city backed off from drafting a new plan.

== Characteristics ==
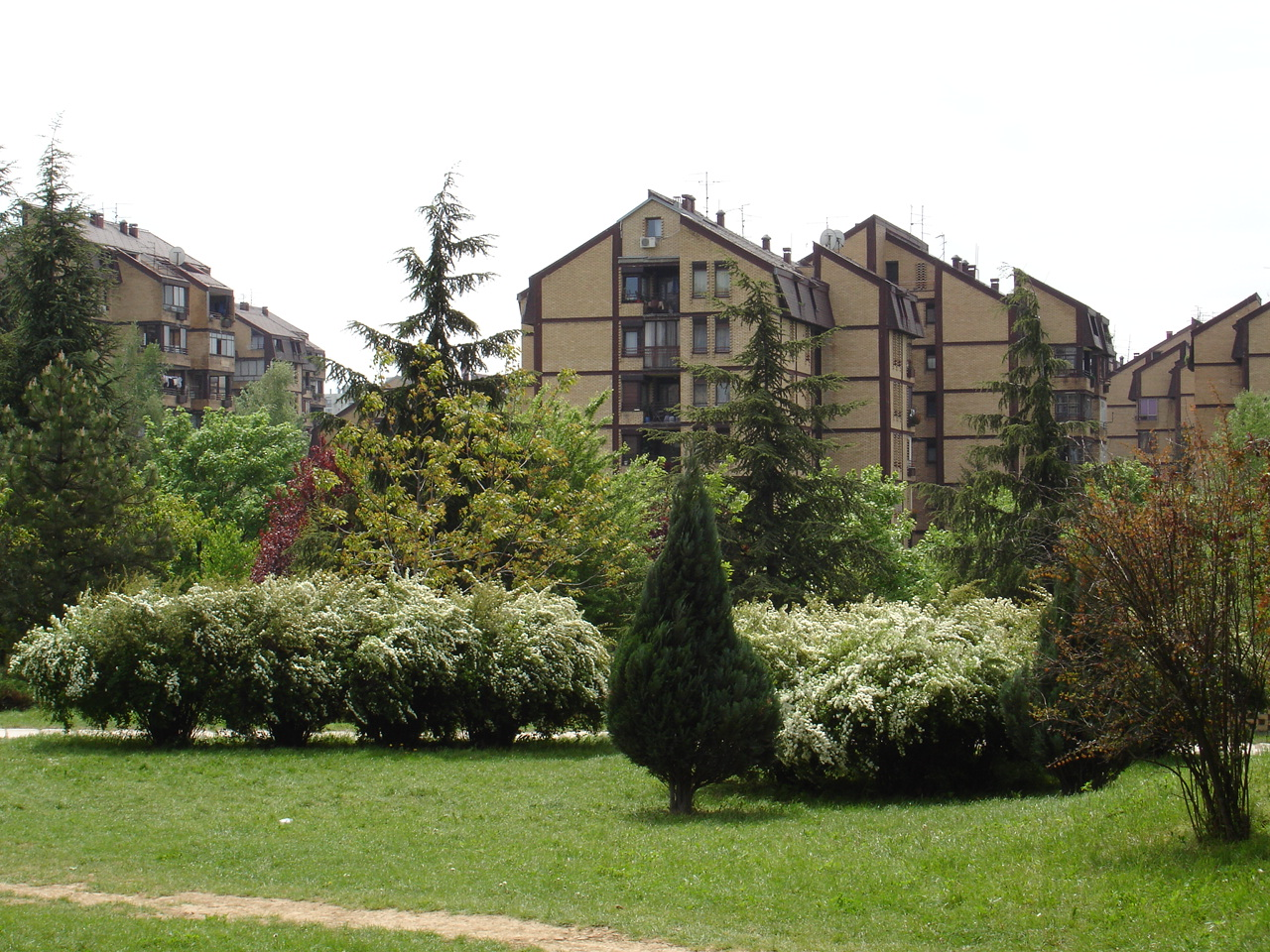
A green space area in Cerak Vinogradi.

The elevation difference in the neighborhood is 60 m (200 ft), in the Kneza Višeslava Street-Ibar Highway axis. The buildings were projected to appear as if they are bending along the former slopes. The buildings are either three or six storeys high. They were built with the "Žeželj method" - use of prefabricated modular elements made of reinforced concrete. The facades are made of red or yellow bricks and the roofs are slanted, which was another deviation from the usual design of the day which included flat rooftops.

One building was selected for further experimenting. It was the first building in Belgrade with solar thermal collector on its roof. It was used for the solar water heating, while the walls were additionally projected for internal heating. The same building was also used as the broadcasting center of one of the first cable networks in Belgrade.

The settlement was planned for 15,000 inhabitants. There are objects which were part of the project, but were not built: public swimming pool, sports arena, multi-functional center at the corner of the Jablanička Street and the Ibar Highway, etc. One of the neighborhood's architects, Milenija Marušić, stated in 2019 that she will continue to insist that everything is built, as per project. In time, the architects suggested other improvements in the neighborhood, but they were not applied, like the glazing of the loggias or 1,000 vegetable gardens around the buildings. Marušić authored a study in July 2019 where she advised how the neighborhood should be preserved in the future.

The borough is residential, with neighborhood type commercial content, and extensive parks and green spaces, with a population of 12,642 in 1991 and 13,091 in 2002. Administratively a local community, sub-municipal administrative units since the 1980s, it merged with the neighboring Cerak and Sportski Centar local communities prior to the 2011 census. United Cerak local community had a population of 43,993. As of June 2015 it has three large supermarkets, a medical center, "Ujedinjene Nacije" elementary school and three large kindergartens.

All streets are named after trees. Some after the species planted along them as avenues, some after generic ones: ash, linden, cedar, red oak, plane, birch, Pančić spruce, etc. The building type is apartment block, usually paired in a line of G+3 and G+6 floors high. There's only light traffic (access roads) inside the neighborhood. The nearby area is residential with developing commercial sector since the 1990s. A shopping mall with a McDonald's restaurant is in the immediate vicinity, with a farmers' market and a number of other stores nearby.

The neighborhood (including Cerak I and Cerak II) spreads over an area of 92 ha (230 acres) and has 3,650 residential units in 67 buildings. Cerak I covers 57.5 ha (142 acres). Plans were made from 1979 to 1980, and the construction lasted from 1979 to 1984. It includes 42 buildings with 2,500 apartments. Plans for Cerak II were drafted from 1980 to 1983 and the construction lasted from 1983 to 1987. It covers 35 ha (86 acres), which include 25 buildings and 1,150 apartments.

== Assessment ==
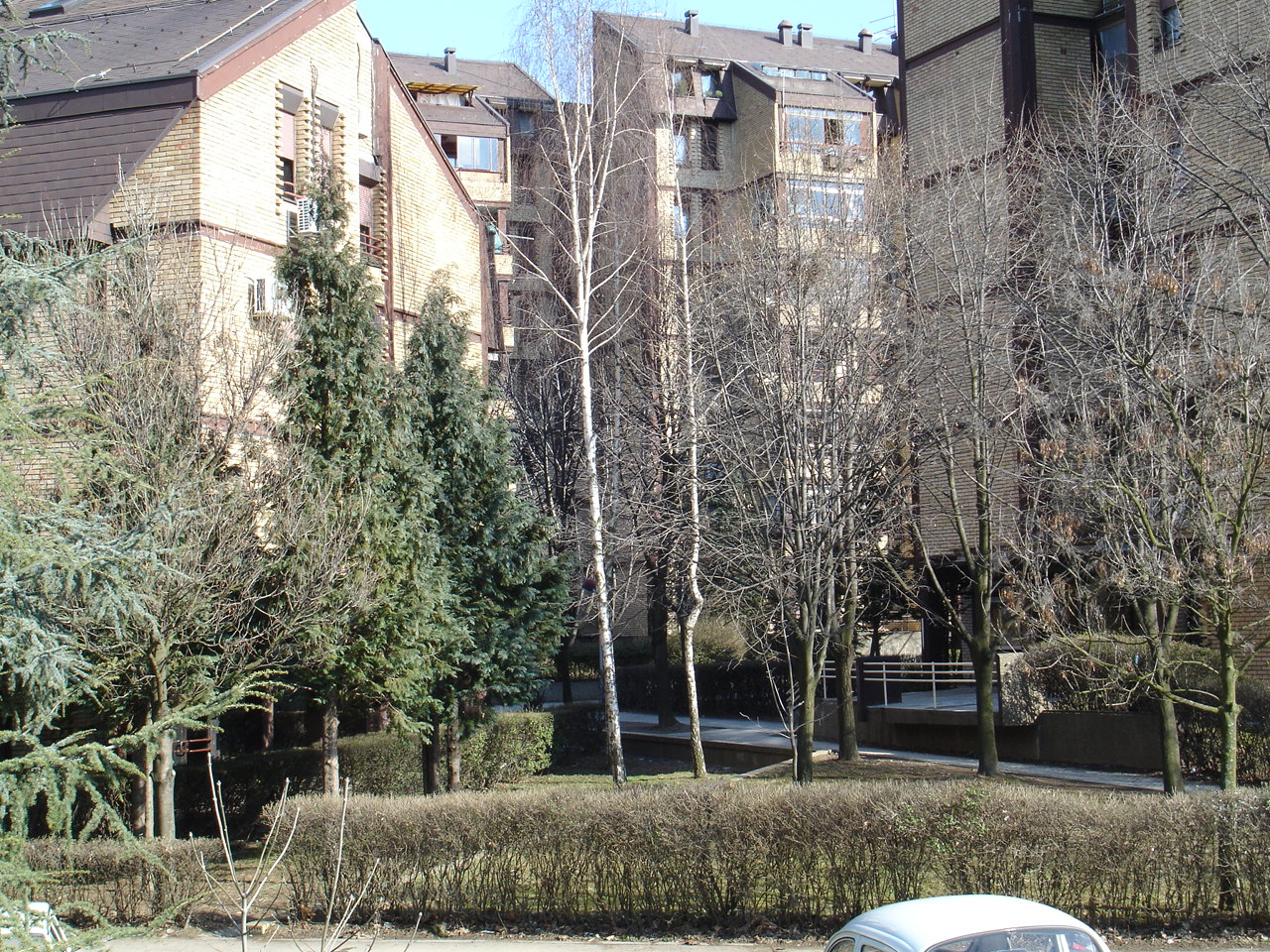
One of the street corners in Cerak Vinogradi

The neighborhood features in the New York's Museum of Modern Art 2018 exhibition exploring the architecture of the former Yugoslavia, Toward a Concrete Utopia: Architecture in Yugoslavia, 1948–1980. The museum researchers preparing the exhibition, stated that Cerak Vinogradi is the only modern neighborhood in former Yugoslavia that hasn't been ruined by additional construction on the green areas and that ambient unit hasn't been devastated. Due to architectural-urbanistic value, the area was originally under the regime of "full protection", meaning complete preservation of the area, with no changes (possible use changes inside particular objects, with preservation of the authenticity and architectural values of the object) - Criteria K2, K8, K6. On 18 January 2019, Cerak Vinogradi was placed under the state protection and declared a cultural monument, as the first modern neighborhood in Belgrade to be protected. After the Concrete Utopia exhibition was finished, together with New Belgrade's Block 23, Cerak Vinogradi remained represented at museum's permanent collection.

After previous bad experience with Blocks 61, 62 and 63, where they had to work under the dictate of the urbanists, here the Marušićs worked together with the chief urbanist in the project, Dragutin Kadović. They followed the rules set by the Roman architect Vitruvius in the 1st century: architecture depends on order, layout, eurythmics, symmetry and economy. The resulting architecture of Cerak Vinogradi is "stylishly clear, inconspicuous, economically rational and proportional to the people of all generations, offering the sense of harmony, simplicity and warmth". It was named as the prime example of late Modern architectural style.

The neighborhood remains one of the last integrally planned urban units in Belgrade and the superior achievements in the entire Yugoslav architecture. Authors (Milenija and Darko Marušić and Nedeljko Borovnica) won The October prize (Оktobarska nagrada) for the Cerak Vinogradi project in 1985.

== Transportation ==
Cerak Vinogradi is a few minutes away from the park-forest of Košutnjak, a short bus ride from major commercial center of Banovo Brdo, river Sava and the island and lake of Ada Ciganlija. It is also well connected with the rest of the city by public bus (GSP Belgrade) lines 23, 37, 50, 51, 52, 53, 56, 59, 89, 531, 532, 533 and 534.
