= Julino Brdo =

Julino Brdo Јулино брдо
- Urban neighbourhood
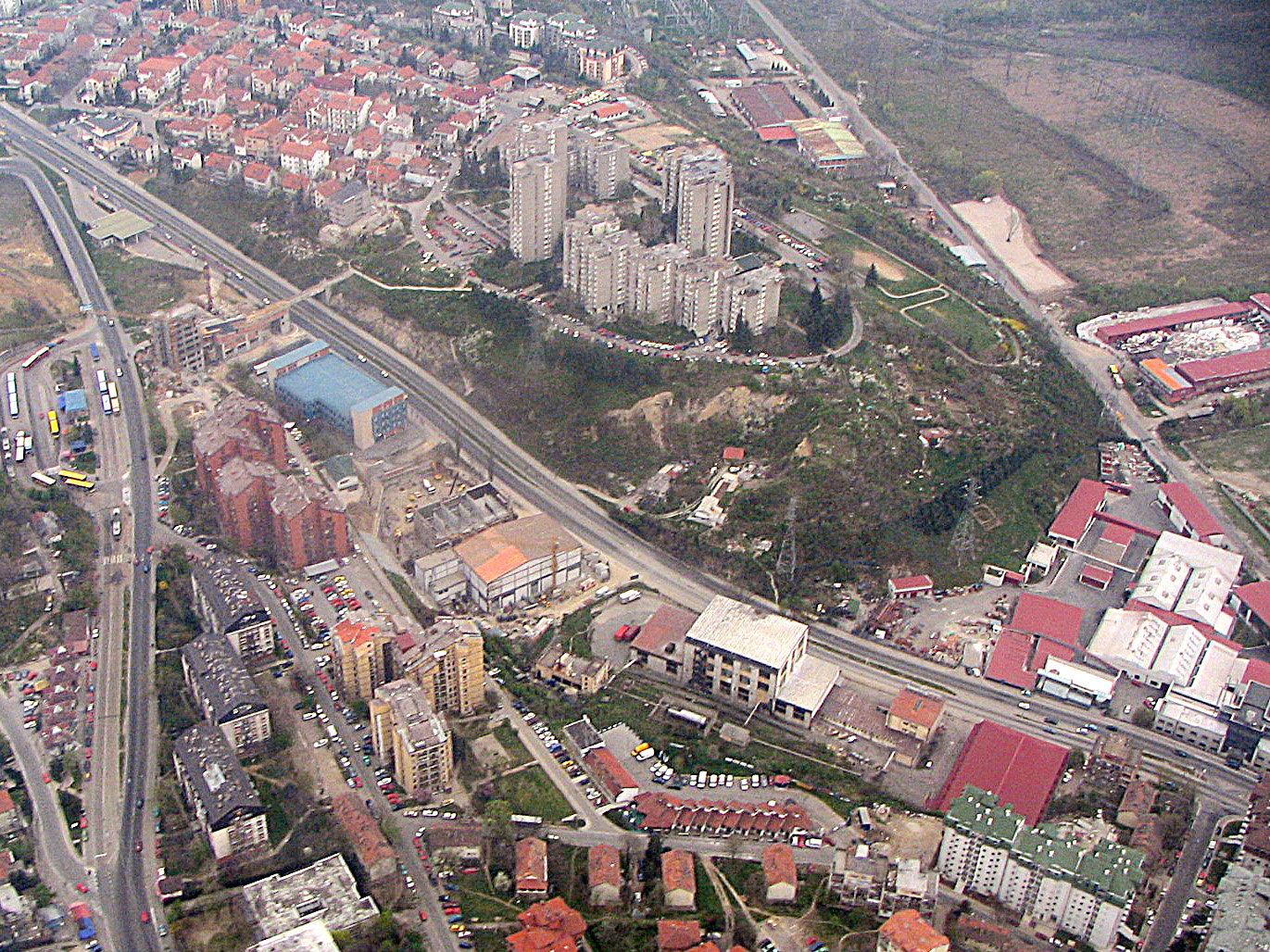
- Aerial view of Julino Brdo
- Etymology: Jula's Hill
- Location within Belgrade
- Country: Serbia
- Region: Belgrade
- Municipality: Čukarica
- Established: 1970

Population (2002)
  - Total: 6,683
- Time zone: UTC+1 (CET)
  - Summer (DST): UTC+2 (CEST)
- Postal code: 11134
- Area code: +381(0)11
- Car plates: BG

Julino Brdo (Serbian Cyrillic: Јулино брдо) is an urban neighborhood of Belgrade, the capital of Serbia. It is located in Belgrade's municipality of Čukarica.

== Location ==
Julino Brdo is the northernmost tip of Žarkovo neighborhood, located between the neighborhoods of Čukarica in the north, Banovo Brdo in the east and northeast, Žarkovo in the south and Makiš in the west. Žarkovo's sub-neighborhood of Zmajevac is to the southwest while Sunčana Padina and Repište are to the southeast.

== Characteristics ==
The name of the hill appeared after 1950. The neighborhood was built by 1971, with first tenants moving in during 1970. It took a while for the neighborhood to get fully equipped, and accounting its solitary position on top of the hill, it was called "end of the world" at the time. Julino Brdo was originally planned for 5,000 residents.

Architect Milan Lojanica and his team worked on the project between 1967 and 1971.

The neighborhood comprises one circular street surrounded by another three streets closing a triangle around the circle. As Julino Brdo consists of several high skyscrapers on the top of a hill, the neighborhood is clearly visible from lower parts of Belgrade, especially across the Sava river, e.g. (Novi Beograd and Zemun).

In terms of architecture, the neighborhood is praised as the design and structure of "higher order". It is described as the successful non-serial urban ensemble, similar to the neighborhood of Labudovo Brdo.

In 1999, construction of the pedestrian bridge which would directly connect Julino Brdo to Banovo Brdo's major public transportation terminus, began. It spans the highly busy Maršala Tolbuhina Street, or the urban section of the Ibar Highway, and was built as part of the complex which was to include two buildings and a plateau from which the bridge extends. The company which was building it, "Stankom", went bankrupt and though the majority of works were finished, they were never completed and the unfinished buildings were left to the elements. Without any maintenance, the bridge deteriorated in time, but the residents are still using it. In June 2019, city officially announced completion of the works to start in August, but "Stankom's" creditors rejected the offered deal. By April 2022, the gapes opened on the bridge, and the entire derelict complex was described as the set of a horror movie.

== Administration ==
For several decades, Julino Brdo constituted one of the local communities, sub-municipal administrative units, within the municipality of Čukarica. It was officially named Julino Brdo at first (1981 census), but was later renamed to Poručnika Spasića i Mašere. According to the censuses, it had a population of 6,998 in 1981, 6,702 in 1991 and 6,683 in 2002. Prior to the 2011 census, it merged with the local communities of Bele Vode and Staro Žarkovo into the local community of Žarkovo.

== Economy ==
There are facilities of Belgrade waterworks constructed in the area (Hydro-technical knot Julino Brdo), including the first above-ground reservoirs for drinking water in Serbia and two tunnels (T-1 and T-1-T2) for water conduction to central Belgrade (Tašmajdan). The expansion of the waterworks facility Makiš-Julino Brdo-Banovo Brdo will encompass two more, larger reservoirs and a new tunnel (T-2) which will conduct water to Košutnjak and Topčider.
