= Tarzanija =

- Website type: Humor website
- Available in: Serbian

Tarzanija.com was one of the most popular Serbian humor websites. It ceased publishing new articles in July 2019, although it is still online. Tarzanija's ranking, according to Alexa.com, was 23,629 worldwide and 34 in Serbia in 2012.

== Features ==
Tarzanija.com mostly consists of authors' blogs with an occasional comic called Stamenko and Mlohavko, a tale of two bananas. Its favorite topics are loitering in Žarkovo neighborhood, amphetamines, heroine, drug dealing and similar. What makes them popular is their unique humor and original approach to contemporary topics. Censorship was almost non-existent in the early days of site, but later, due to the pressure of advertisers like Zlatiborac and public figures like Novak Djokovic, Tarzanija implemented a new censorship strategy, which required all of the articles to be reviewed by the editor-in-chief before publishing. If the author was dissatisfied with editor's decision, he could file a complaint to a special Tarzanija's judicial body, called "Council of the blogosphere lords", which consisted of Sixer, Wizard from the train, Preža Rasula, Vanja Bursać and Father Gavrilo.

Tarzanija writers used pseudonyms. Among them, Black Anna, Sestara, Klem Rasti, Mr. Joke and Drugged Squirrel enjoyed he highest reputation in the Serbian blogosphere.
