= Čukarička Padina =

Čukarička Padina Чукаричка Падина
- Urban neighbourhood
- Location within Belgrade
- Coordinates: 44°46′37″N 20°24′25″E
- Country: Serbia
- Region: Belgrade
- Municipality: Čukarica
- Time zone: UTC+1 (CET)
  - Summer (DST): UTC+2 (CEST)
- Area code: +381(0)11
- Car plates: BG

Čukarička padina (Serbian Cyrillic: Чукаричка Падина) is an urban neighborhood of Belgrade, the capital of Serbia. It is located in Belgrade's municipality of Čukarica.

== Location ==
Čukarička Padina is located between the neighborhoods of Čukarica to the east, and Makiš to the west. Actually, it is the westernmost part of the Banovo Brdo neighborhood, a strip of land on the slopes of the hill alongside the Savska magistrala road, overlooking the Sava river and Ada Ciganlija, thus the descriptive name, Čukarička Padina, which in Serbian means slope of Čukarica.

== Characteristics ==
The bank of the Sava river where the modern neighborhood is, was a starting point of the raft ferry line which connected two sides of the river. The merchants dug lagums, underground rooms and corridors into the rock slope and used them as a storage areas. The lagums still exist, but the entrances are buried.

The southernmost, triangularly shaped extension of the local community includes the FMP complex. It is located between the streets of Endija Vorhola (on the east) and Milorada Jovanovića (on the west), and the northern slopes of Julino Brdo (on the south). The 3.2 ha (7.9 acres) large complex includes former metal factory FMP and the basketball hall. In March 2023 it was announced that all 18 existing structures within the complex will be demolished, and the commercial-residential project "Victory Gardens", with five large buildings, will be built instead.

The local community had a population of 9,296 in 2011.

== Transport ==
Historical population
Year	Pop.	±%
1981	4,412	—
1991	8,369	+89.7%
2002	10,720	+28.1%
2011	9,296	−13.3%

Čukarička Padina is connected with other parts of the city by public transport:

Bus lines:

- No. 55: Zvezdara - Stari Železnik;
- No. 56: Zeleni Venac - Petlovo Brdo;
- No. 56L: Zeleni Venac - Čukarička Padina;
- No. 87: Čukarička Padina - Banovo Brdo;
- No. 89: Vidikovac - Novi Beograd (Blok 61);
- No. 581: Beograd (Lastina stanica) - Lazarevac AS;
- No. 581A: Beograd (Lastina stanica) - Lazarevac (Dom zdravlja);

Night lines:

- No. 511: Trg Republike - Sremčica

== Čukarička Šuma ==
In time, a shanty town developed in the woods across the New Obrenovac motorway. It was named Čukarička Šuma (Čukarica Forest). An informal settlement, it is inhabited by the Romanies who work as a waste pickers and mostly use fire to extract the valuable materials from the garbage. Since the early 2010s, as the settlement grew, a large, thick clouds of smoke and bad smell from the burning garbage began cloaking urbanized section of the settlement almost on a daily basis. Frequent gatherings and public protests of the citizens and limited communal efforts to clean, adapt and sanitize the forested area around the shanty town failed to solve the problem despite the fact that the activities which cause it are illegal. Municipality of Čukarica promised it will relocate the informal settlers and build a recycling center which will bring the activities of the settlers into the legal flows. As of March 2018, the shanty town had some 80 houses, and the pollution problems continued into 2019.
