= Filmski Grad =

Filmski Grad Филмски Град
- Urban neighbourhood
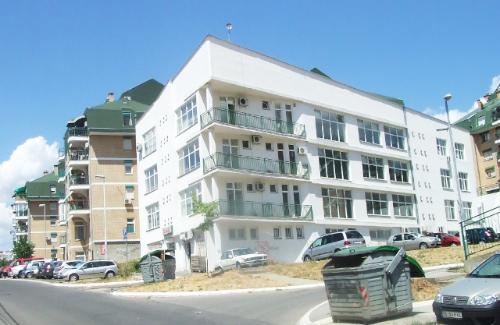
- Arčibalda Rajsa Street

- Location within Belgrade
- Coordinates: 44°45′N 20°26′E
- Country: Serbia
- Region: Belgrade
- Municipality: Čukarica
- Time zone: UTC+1 (CET)
  - Summer (DST): UTC+2 (CEST)
- Area code: +381(0)11
- Car plates: BG

Filmski Grad (Serbian Cyrillic: Филмски Град) is an urban neighborhood of Belgrade, the capital of Serbia. It is located in Belgrade's municipality of Čukarica.

== Location ==
Filmski Grad is a small neighborhood (sub-neighborhood of Košutnjak, actually), comprising several streets, located along the right side of the Kneza Višeslava Street, between the Košutnjak park on the north and east, Skojevsko Naselje on the south and Cerak-Cerak Vinogradi on the west.

== History ==
Mitra Mitrović Đilas, Serbian minister of education, summoned Yugoslav army's liaison officer Dejan Obradović in 1945 and notified him that he was selected to organize film making in the state. After his response that he knew nothing about it, Mitrović Đilas said that was exactly the reason he was selected, and gave him a list of duties. The first was to select a locality in Belgrade for the "film city". Obradović left the meeting uncertain whether he had been tasked to find a place where films are shot, or where the film crew dwells.

Seven days later, Milovan Đilas, Đilas's husband at the time and one of the top state officials, called Obradović and asked him about the selected location. On learning that Obradović hadn't chosen it yet, he picked him up in a jeep and they spent the entire day criss-crossing the city. In the end, Đilas parked in Košutnjak, next to the forest along the road, and said to Obradović, "I don't have time anymore. I have to go. And you can, there, build that film city of yours". Known as Avala Film, Filmski Grad or simply Košutnjak, the film studio was the first of its kind in Serbia and Yugoslavia, and Obradović was appointed as the manager of the "Jugoslavija Film" company.

== Characteristics ==
Košutnjak studios of the national Serbian broadcaster, RTS are located there, as well as a large film studio of Avala Film film company, which gave the name to the entire neighborhood (Filmski Grad in Serbian means film city).

== 2020 project ==
In June 2020, plans for further, massive reduction of the Košutnjak forest were announced. City's detailed regulatory plan for Filmski Grad, which occupies the entire southwest section of Košutnjak, includes construction of the new residential complex for 8,000 people, with numerous luxurious dwellings and expensive hotels. It also includes cutting of the 17 ha (42 acres) of forest, which will from 27 ha (67 acres) be reduced to 10 ha (25 acres) in two separated forested pockets. The planned objects will cover almost 10 times more area than they do now. Entire plan actually covers 87 ha (210 acres), of which 40 ha (99 acres), where the forest is located, belongs to the investor, private "Avala Studios" company. The investor then stated they will keep only 7 ha (17 acres) of forest, because everything else is "worthless" and that forest doesn't exist.

Plan basically includes construction of an entire mini-city, which would also include numerous restaurants, cultural, educational and sports objects: film depot for Yugoslav Film Archive, elementary and secondary school, retirement home, library, theater, cinema, annexes the students dorm and restaurant "Košutnjak" and apartments for some 100 people who dwell in the film studio complex since the 1990s. City officials either said it was too early to assess the situation (chief urbanist Stojčić) or openly, with all the evidence and statements to the contrary, said that everything is a lie and that forest will not be cut (deputy mayor Goran Vesić). As the project includes revitalization of Filmski Grad film studios, the city plan also claims that development of film industry in this area is one of the government's priority, but the government made no such decision.

This section of the forest is not protected, unlike the rest of Košutnjak. Citizens, already annoyed by the policy of the present administration to cut trees all over the urbanized city area and organized in various groups, coordinated protests and petitions, accusing city officials of hiding behind the COVID-19 pandemic to push bad and corruptive projects. They cite the investors alleged interest in revitalizing the film studio, but adding ten times more residential and commercial space, with massive garages and private sports complexes, on some of the most expensive city ground. The investor claim that for "every tree we cut, we will plant three on some other location in the city" and that construction will start in 2021.

Serbian section of Europa Nostra, pan-European umbrella organization for Europe's cultural and natural heritage, examined the plan, stating that the film studios are only used as the pretext for the massive luxurious construction and that projects is opposed to the public interest. They also suggested that the investor should be obliged to only reconstruct existing objects, not to enlarge them tenfold. The protesters also noted the traffic problems, as the existing streets leading to Filmski Grad are already causing traffic bottleneck. Also, they called the plan of cutting trees in one part of the city and planting seedling in another, an insult to the intelligence.
