= Luka Kebara =

Serbian politician

- Лука Кебара

Member of the National Assembly of Serbia
- Incumbent
- Assumed office 2020

Personal details
- Born: 1994 (age 31–32) Belgrade, Republic of Serbia, Federal Republic of Yugoslavia
- Party: Serbian Progressive Party
- Education: University of Belgrade

Luka Kebara (Serbian Cyrillic: Лука Кебара; born 1994) is a Serbian politician. He was elected to the National Assembly of Serbia in the 2020 parliamentary election a member of the Serbian Progressive Party (SNS).

== Biography ==
Kebara was born in Belgrade, Republic of Serbia, in what was then the Federal Republic of Yugoslavia. He holds a bachelor's degree in political science and a master's degree focused on terrorism, organized crime, and security, both from the University of Belgrade.

Kebara has been a participant in the SNS Academy of Young Leaders program and was a citizen member of the municipal administrative commission in the Belgrade municipality of Čukarica.

He was given the thirteenth position on the SNS electoral list Aleksandar Vučić — For Our Children for the 2020 Serbian parliamentary election. This was tantamount to election, and he was indeed elected when the list won a landslide victory with 188 mandates out of 250. He is now a member of the assembly committee on constitutional and legislative issues and the committee on administrative, budgetary, mandate, and immunity issues; a deputy member of the foreign affairs committee; the head of Serbia's parliamentary friendship group with Zambia, and a member of the parliamentary friendship groups with Austria, Belgium, Bosnia and Herzegovina, Canada, China, the Czech Republic, Denmark, Finland, Germany, the Holy See, Hungary, Iceland, Iran, Ireland, Israel, Liechtenstein, Luxembourg, Malta, Moldova, Montenegro, the Netherlands, North Korea, Norway, Oman, Poland, Russia, Slovakia, Slovenia, South Korea, the Sovereign Military Order of Malta, Sweden, Switzerland, Syria, the United Arab Emirates, the United Kingdom, and the United States of America.
