= Makiš =

Makiš Макиш
- Urban neighbourhood
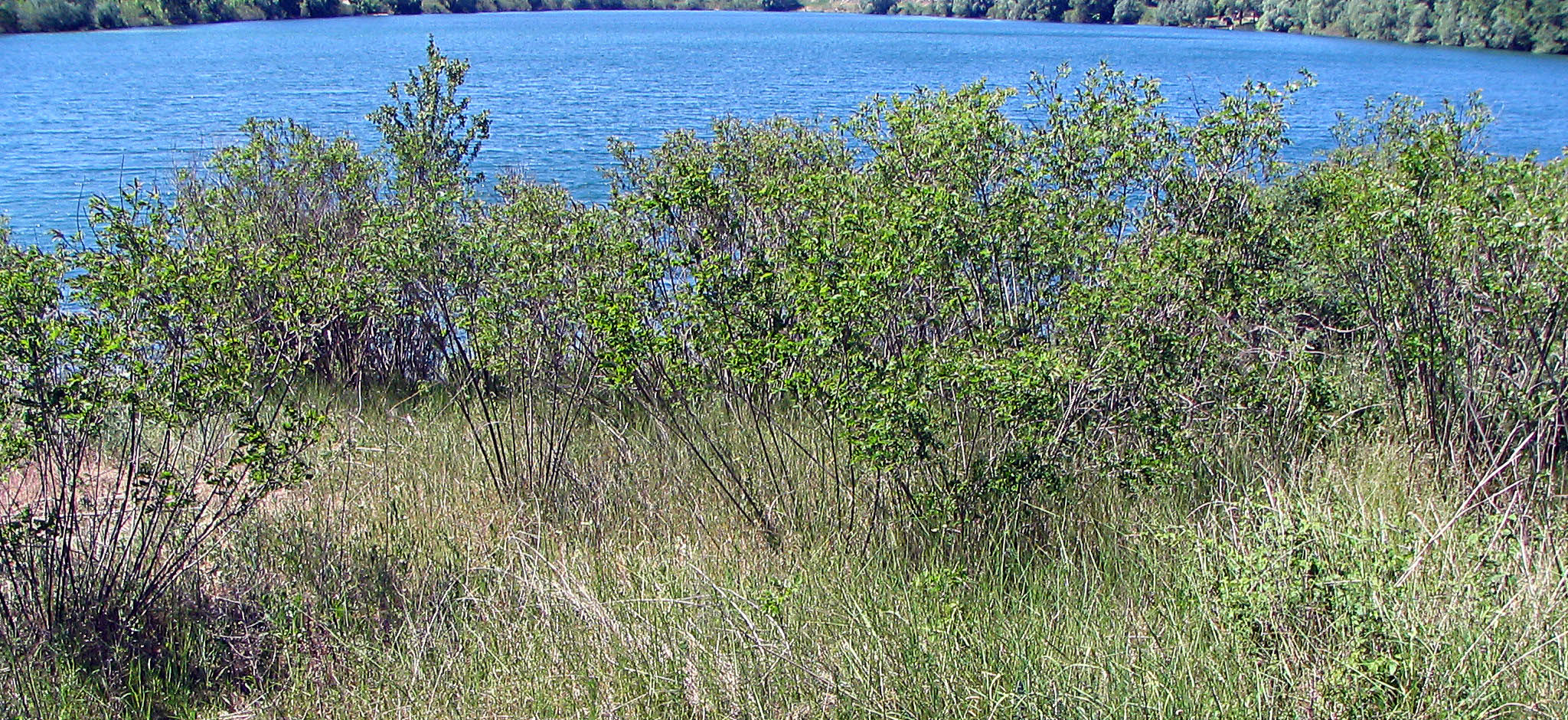
- Colony of false indigo bush in Makiš, on the Sava bank

- Location within Belgrade
- Coordinates: 44°45′28″N 20°22′01″E
- Country: Serbia
- Region: Belgrade
- Municipality: Čukarica

Population
  - Total: 1,217
- Time zone: UTC+1 (CET)
  - Summer (DST): UTC+2 (CEST)
- Area code: +381(0)11
- Car plates: BG

Makiš (Serbian: Макиш) is a forest and an urban neighborhood of Belgrade, the capital of Serbia. It is located in Belgrade's municipality of Čukarica.

== Location ==
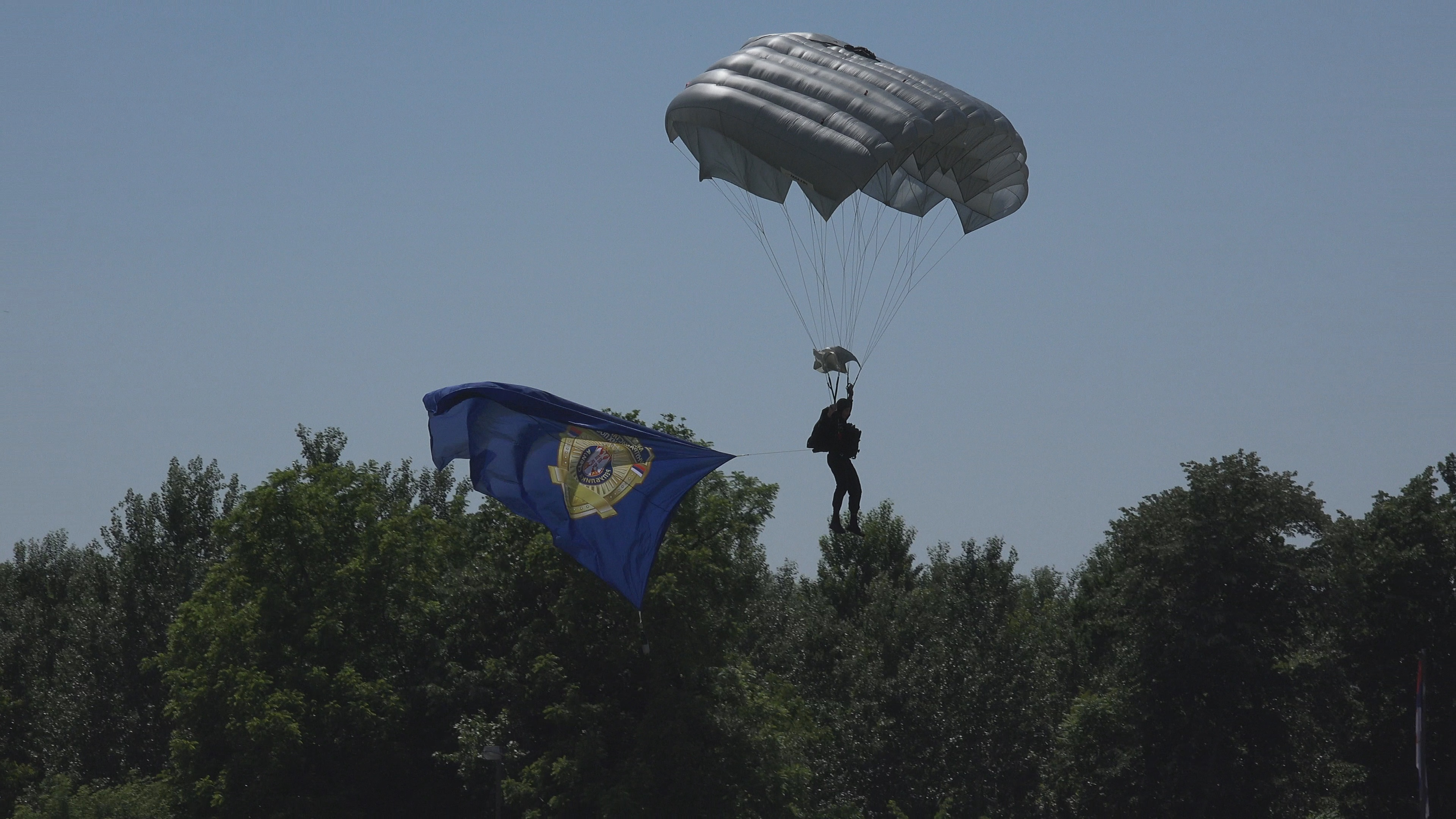
Maneuvers in Makiš, celebrating the Day of the Police of Serbia

Makiš is bordered by the Sava river and Sava Lake to the west and north, Čukarica and Čukarička Padina to the northeast, Julino Brdo, Žarkovo, Bele Vode and Rupčine to the east, Železnik to the south and Ostružnica to the southwest.

== Geography ==
For the most part, Makiš is a marshy forest, crossed by many small streams and canals, most notably the Marevica. Northern part is known as Jedek, western as Aščinica and central as Veliko Okno. Part of the Sava's alluvial plane, the main section of the area, which covers several hundreds of hectares, is covered with gravel and sand which are 10,000 years old. In time, a plentiful water source formed. As the Sava river reaches the bend at Makiš, some water continues in the straight direction, penetrating the ground in the fan-shaped manner, without reaching the surface. Through the "flake" system of dispersion, the water filters itself through the non-organic wall, made of gravel, sand and other silicate minerals, before reaching the reservoirs. The natural underground reservoirs spread over several hundreds of hectares, at the depth of 8 to 25 m (26 to 82 ft). The water is drained by the Ranney collectors.

In the early 19th century, the area was covered in thick forest. Until the 20th century, Makiš was known for plentiful pastures used by the farmers from the nearby Žarkovo for their livestock.

In total, Makiš forest spreads on 4 km^{2} (1.5 sq mi).

== Characteristics ==
Historical population
Year	Pop.	±%
1981	946	—
1991	953	+0.7%
2002	1,379	+44.7%
2011	1,217	−11.7%

Makiš is for the most part non-residential (it had a population of only 1,217 in 2011), but important for the city industry and transportation. Major roads of Sava motorway and Old Obrenovac road cross through the area, marking western and eastern borders of the neighborhood. The railway also passes on the eastern border were the Makiš marshalling yard, largest one in south-east Europe, is located. The central facilities (including the water factory) of the Belgrade waterworks are located in Makiš, so as many gravel digging and cement plant on the bank of the Sava river.

First waterworks which supplied Belgrade from Makiš was finished in 1892, and the system was ceremonially opened on 12 July 1892, at Terazije. At the time, it was one of the most modern such facilities in Southeast Europe, projected by engineer Oskar Smrekar (1854–1935). For the first time in Belgrade, the underground water was used by the water supply system, instead of water springs. Original capacity was 2.800 m^{3} (98.9 cu ft) per day, for 80.000 citizens. By 1914, the production grew to 8.000 m^{3} (282.5 cu ft) daily. As Belgrade grew in the decades to come, the first water treatment facility ("water factory" Makiš 1) became operational in April 1987. It treats water from the Sava river. Another treatment facility, Makiš 2, was built from 2004 to September 2014, which should cover Belgrade's need for water until 2035.

During the Interbellum, the waterworks company built the residential complex for its workers in Makiš, which originally consisted of two buildings within the industrial facility. Makiš Stadium is located in the northern section of Makiš.

== Planned projects ==
=== Aerial lift ===
The "Čavlina and Sladoljev" company from Zagreb drafted the project of connecting two banks of the Sava by the cable car in 1922. The project never realized. Engineer and CEO of the institute for urbanism and dwelling "Juginus", Mirko Radovanac, revived the idea in the 1990s. After extensive surveys (traffic analysis, interviews with the commuters, climatic, geological, urban and other research), they presented the project in 1993. They proposed the terminuses should be at the Sports Center Košutnjak and Block 44 in the neighborhood of Savski Blokovi in New Belgrade, across the Sava. Stops in between would include the major public transportation roundabout in Banovo Brdo, Makiš and Ada Ciganlija, five in total. They called it the "ideal route". The plan also included construction of commercial areas around the terminuses, which would cover 2,000 m^{2} (22,000 sq ft), helping the profitability of the project. Apart from being ecological and an attraction, it was estimated that it would shorten the trip for 45 minutes.

City government later included the project into the city's General Urban Plan, which envisioned the construction in phases, the first being a 1,000 m (3,300 ft) long section Block 44-Ada Ciganlija. It would lay on 8 steel pillars, 35 m (115 ft) above the ground and the trip would last for 3 minutes. The cabins were projected to receive not just the commuters, but also the bicycles, skateboards, sledges and skis, as the cableway was planned to work year-round. There would be a total of 27 pillars, it would be 5 km (3.1 mi) long which would be travelled in 15 minutes by 2,000 commuters per hour.

Despite the project being publicly revived by the mayors Dragan Đilas (2008–2013) and Siniša Mali (2013–2018), it remained on hold. The idea was included in the Belgrade's General Regulatory Plan again in December 2021, including two phases: New Belgrade-Ada Ciganlija-Makiš, and Makiš-Banovo Brdo-Košutnjak. After announcing relocation of the zoo to Ada Ciganlija, mayor Aleksandar Šapić announced execution of the project, announcing also reactivation of the publicly unknown city project from 2009.

=== Makiš Field ===
Eastern section, across the Sava motorway is called Makiš Field (Serbian: Макишко поље, romanized: Makiško polje). In the south and south-western section the Makiš marshalling yard and the neighborhood of Železnik are located.

After several plans for the Belgrade Metro since the 1960s, a new plan was announced on 3 July 2017, which envisions first two lines as the 22 km (14 mi) long Makiš-Mirijevo (via Sava Amphitheatre and Karaburma) and the 19.8 km (12.3 mi) long Zemun-Ustanička. The construction should start in the end of 2019 or the beginning of 2020 and should be finished in 3 to 4 years. The project differs from all the previous ones as it sets the crossing of the major lines under the Belgrade Waterfront on the Sava bank, a highly controversial pet project of President of Serbia Aleksandar Vučić and mayor Mali, instead under the central city squares of Terazije or Republic Square as planned in the previous decades. Mayor of Belgrade Siniša Mali also announced that the first line is actually going to be Makiš Field-Mirijevo (that is, Višnjičko Polje) instead of Zemun-Ustanička which was planned as the first for decades.

Architects and engineers reacted negatively, especially since both terminuses are at the moment nothing more than still un-urbanized heaths, though mayor Mali said that this line will connect the future projects which will "with the development of metro, bring billions of euros in investments and millions of square meters of the new business areas". Dr Ratomir Vračarević, traffic engineer and professor at the University of Belgrade's Faculty of Technical Sciences said how the surveys showed that this direction has a very low number of potential commuters, well below the profitability level. Architect Branislav Jovin, who authored the 1970s subway project, said that he believes Makiš was chosen because of the announced project of Tesla Grad ("Tesla City") by Bogoljub Karić, Karić, a tycoon who fled the country so that he wouldn't be trialed for financial schemes, returned after the change of government. Three weeks later, city indeed announced that Karić's company "BK Group" won the competition for the project of "Tesla Grad" in Makiš Field with Mali personally giving advice what should be built in the complex. On the very day when this was announced, Karić stated that he already finalized everything at the meeting with Mali and city architect Milutin Folić and that the project is just one step away from realization.

Preparatory works for the metero's depot in Makiš began on 22 November 2021. Protesters gathered at the location, though not preventing workers. Despite calling this date a historic one in Belgrade's history, none of the state or city officials was present when works began. Massive filling of the vast area with earth and sand ensued. In November 2023 mayor Aleksandar Šapić said that when works were finished, "we will get a town within a town", and that entire central- and north-eastern sections of Makiš will be urbanized, with new major thoroughfare above the projected route, and business and residential buildings around it, while the Obrenovac Road will be transformed into the highway. According to Šapić, this section of Makiš will become the "new urban part of the town, which was completely unused so far".

=== Tesla Grad ===
A residential-business complex, an "ambitiously envisioned international business center for fun and trade", was announced on 21 July 2017. The project covers an area of 680 m (2,230 ft), with 4,000,000 m^{2} (43,000,000 sq ft) of space, though site of the "BK Group" mentions only half of that. It is planned for 31,000 inhabitants. The starting point of the new settlement, from the city direction, will be a residential and commercial complex (apartments, shops, elementary schools, kindergartens, ambulances, cultural and sport venues, hotels) surrounding the 25-storeys high skyscraper. Lush vegetation is planned between the blocks, while cars will be parked in underground garages on the edges of the blocks. A main street through the settlement, in the entire north–south direction is also planned with the commercial zone around it. It will be parallel to the Sava motorway, with the green belt and avenues. Above the marshaling yard large salons for selling cars, ceramics, furniture, etc. are planned. The lots along the Belgrade bypass and Ostružnica Bridge are projected for the large hypermarkets and similar venues. Mayor Mali added that the national stadium might be built in this section, too.

The main concern at the moment, is the fact that Makiš is Belgrade's main water source. In order to accommodate such a big project and make it possible, city government actually reduced the buffer zones by half around the water sources. This way, a construction is allowed close to the, and even though city authorities claim it is still enough to preserve the purity of the water, though some experts disagree. They urged not to destroy the water sources and to preserve it for the future generations which may apply other solutions for water supply, like the use of the underground water sources from the valleys of the Sava and Drina rivers which yield more water of higher quality, but are distant from the city. Geology engineer Branislav Božović said that building of such a major urban project on this location, beside the danger to the water sources, will also affect the micro climate of New Belgrade and Sava amphitheater and will cause the shutting off of the natural ventilation along the valleys of the rivers Topčiderska Reka, Železnička Reka and Ostružnička Reka.

In September 2017 it was announced that the National Stadium will probably not be built within the scopes of Tesla Grad as there are complicated issues concerning the ownership of the land in Makiš. Later, another location, across the river and close to Surčin was chosen. The entire Tesla Grad in general has been described as "even greater misfortune than Belgrade Waterfront".

In December 2020, city assembly organized public session to discuss the project, now enlarged to 4,500,000 m^{2} (48,000,000 sq ft), for 36,500 residents, but citing coronavirus outbreak, and with the use of security guards and police, city prevented public to attend. This became a common thing in 2020, so the activists asked from city administration not to organize public inspections like this during the pandemic, but the city refused citing they already strictly follow measures instituted by the government, which means that only one member of the public can attend the inspection. City also claimed that the urbanization of Makiš was already planned in 1974 and that 2015 study by the Institute "Jaroslav Černi" which was used to reduce the buffer zones, was ordered in 2009. "Jaroslav Černi" refused to comment publicly claiming they are understaffed due to the pandemic, but later issued a statement that there is no ecological concern. Public, citizens' and activists' groups, ecologists, opposition parties and a group of Belgrade University professors protested and urged the city government not to adopt the plan, with professors calling the study faulty. On 30 December 2020, amidst protests and minor physical confrontation with the security guards, city assembly adopted the plan for the urbanization of Makiš.

On 25 January 2021, vice-president of the "BK Group" Dragomir Karić said they are withdrawing from the Tesla Grad project. He claimed they planned to build cheap apartments which pose no threat to the water sources, but after talking with the local residents and various organizations, they backed off as they met with lack of understanding.
