= Rupčine =

Rupčine Рупчине
- urban neighborhood
- Location within Belgrade
- Coordinates: 44°44′35″N 20°23′47″E
- Country: Serbia
- District: City of Belgrade
- Municipality: Čukarica
- Local community: Žarkovo (part of)

Population (2022)
  - Total: 7,000
- Time zone: UTC+1 (CET)
  - Summer (DST): UTC+2 (CEST)
- ZIP code: 11031

Rupčine (Serbian Cyrillic: Рупчине) is an urban neighborhood of Belgrade, the capital of Serbia. It is located in Belgrade's municipality of Čukarica.

== Location ==
Rupčine is actually the southwesternmost part of the Žarkovo neighborhood, bordered by Bele Vode to the north, Cerak Vinogradi (that is, Ibarska Magistrala road) to the east, and the Vodovodska Street and Makiš to the west. On the south, Rupčine borders with the open fields of Stari Lanci and Novi Lanci, which stretch all the way to Železnik.

== Characteristics ==
Quite contrary to its eastern bordering neighborhood, Cerak Vinogradi, Rupčine is not built according to urban plans, therefore it has an unprecedented order. The name rupčine is Serbian for big holes.

Neighborhood had an estimated 7,000 inhabitants in March 2022.

== Sub-neighborhoods ==
Makiške Terase

By the 2020s, some parts of the neighborhood acquired more favorable names. Northern half, directly descending from Bele Vode, was named Makiške Terase ("Makiš Terraces"). It starts at the Momčila Čedića Street, where the sign with the new name of the neighborhood was placed. Border with the southern half of Rupčine is the Časlava Veljića Street, where a new, local post office "Makiške Terase" was opened in March 2022.

Sometimes, the name is used for the entire Rupčine neighborhood.

Savska Terasa

Southern section of Rupčine, in the direction of Železnik, became known as Savska Terasa ("Sava Terrace"). The foundations for the new The Church of Synaxis of the Saint John the Baptist, in the Đure Gavele Street, were consecrated on 16 April 2017 by the Patriarch of the Serbian Orthodox Church, Irinej. The lot was donated by the local resident Mrs. Borika Nikolić. Church was designed by architect Ljubica Bošnjak, and was to be completed by the end of 2023. It was finished and consecrated by the Patriarch Porfirije on 8 October 2023.
