= Repište, Belgrade =

Repište Репиште
- Neighborhood
- Location within Belgrade
- Coordinates: 44°45′22.65″N 20°25′06.28″E
- Country: Serbia
- City: Belgrade
- Municipality: Čukarica

Repište (Serbian Cyrillic: Репиште, pronounced [rě̞piːʃte̞]) is an urban neighborhood of Belgrade, the capital of Serbia. It is located in Belgrade's municipality of Čukarica.

== Location ==
Repište actually makes the eastern part of the Žarkovo neighborhood, bordered by the Banovo Brdo and Sunčana Padina to the north, Sports Center Košutnjak to the east, Cerak to the south and Žarkovo itself to the west.

== History ==
Prior to urbanization, the hilly area above Repište was known as the grapevine growing area.

A report from 1970 described Repište as a "new neighborhood" that many Belgraders from downtown were not familiar with. At the time, Repište had pleasant houses with yards and gardens, but the streets had no pavements or street lights. Still, it also appeared as a large construction yard since many houses weren't finished.

== Characteristics ==
It is almost exclusively a residential area. The name of the neighborhood, Repište, means turnip field.

However, according to the local Žarkovo myth, parts of the village were named after the events surrounding the gigantic dragon who harassed the villagers in the area around the water spring above the village. Living in the cave next to the spring, dragon was abducting the most beautiful girls who would come to get water from the water source. In the end, the dragon was killed by the brave young man named Žarko. The humongous animal slammed into the ground creating a valley. Where his head fell, the hamlet of Zmajevac was formed (Serbian zmaj, dragon), where was his tail is modern Repište (rep, tail), Repište Creek began to flow where his body slammed, while Žarkovo itself was named after the hero who killed the dragon.

Extension of the Košutnjak forest which spreads into the neighborhood is classified as a separate, Repište Forest, which covers an area of 6 ha (15 acres).
