= Bele Vode =

Urban neighborhood of Belgrade, the capital of Serbia

Bele Vode Беле Воде
- Urban neighbourhood
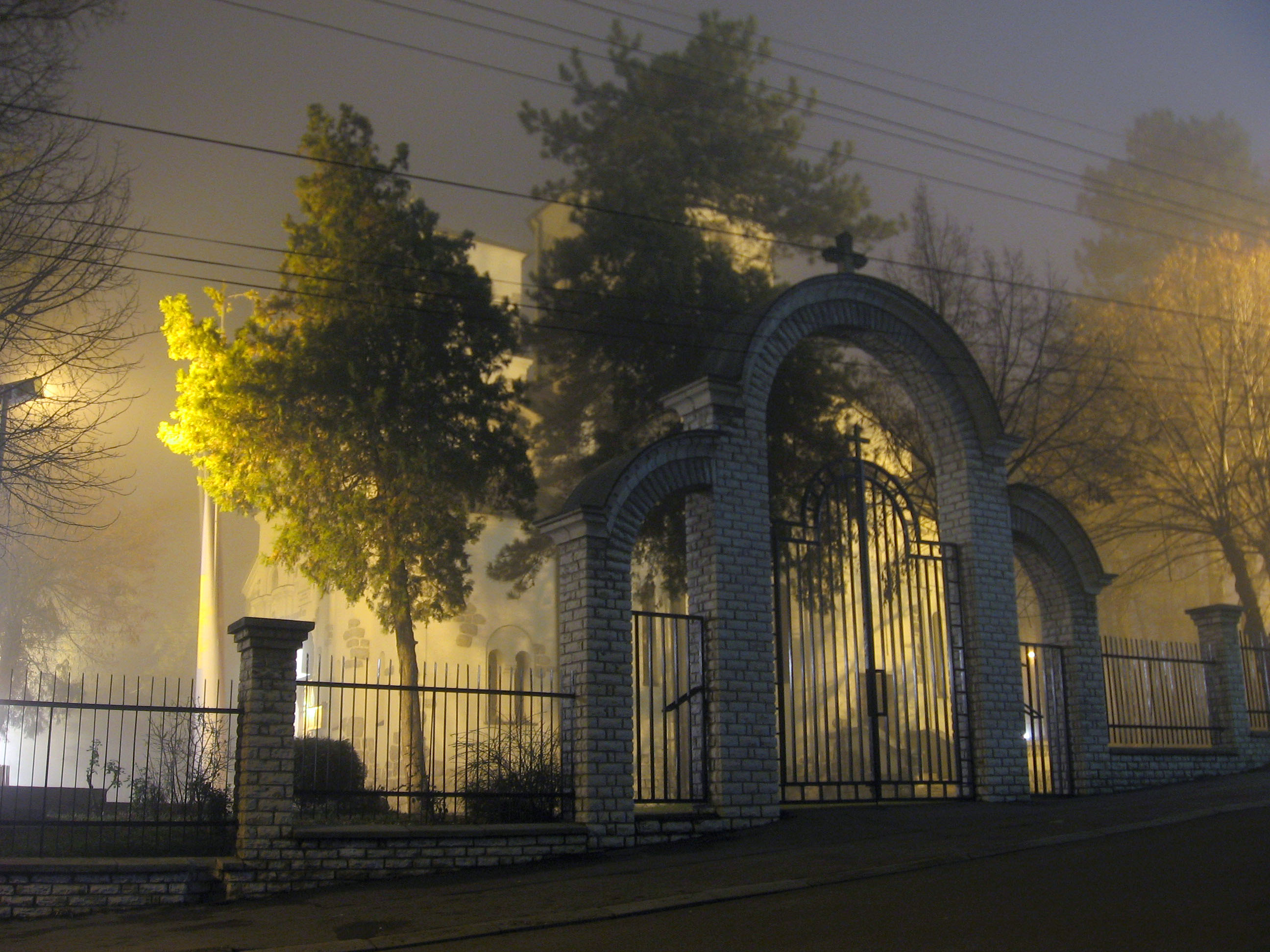
- Church of the Saint of Ascension
- Etymology: White waters
- Location within Belgrade
- Country: Serbia
- Region: Belgrade
- Municipality: Čukarica
- Time zone: UTC+1 (CET)
  - Summer (DST): UTC+2 (CEST)
- Area code: +381(0)11
- Car plates: BG

Bele Vode (Serbian Cyrillic: Беле воде, lit. "White Waters") is an urban neighborhood of Belgrade, the capital of Serbia. It is located in Belgrade's municipality of Čukarica.

== Location ==
Historical population
Year	Pop.	±%
1981	11,920	—
1991	11,631	−2.4%
2002	14,255	+22.6%

Bele Vode is located in the southwestern part of Belgrade, as a western sub-neighborhood of Žarkovo. It is located west of the Ibarska magistrala (Highway of Ibar), bounded by Staro Žarkovo from the north, Cerak from the east, Rupčine from the south and Makiš from the west.

Bele Vode is known for the central Belgrade waterworks plant located there, including the 'water factory'. Name of the neighborhood in Serbian means white waters. The local community (mesna zajednica) of Bele Vode within the municipality of Čukarica had a population of 14,255 in 2002, before it was again incorporated into the local community of Žarkovo.

Military Technical Institute Belgrade (former Aeronautical Technical Institute – VTI Žarkovo) is located in the neighborhood. There is an elementary school within Bele Vode local community early called "Bele Vode", then the name was changed to "Milentije Popović" (World War II veteran and member of the Communist Party of Yugoslavia) . Now the name of this school is "Miroslav Antić" (a Serbian Poet, Film Director and Journalist).

One of the major features in the neighborhood is the park of the same name, Park Bele Vode. The park is bordered by the streets of Trgovačka on the east, Zdravka Jovanovića on the west, Krste Stetenovića on the north and the Military Technical Institute Belgrade on the south. Belo Vrelo street (formerly Mate Jerkovića) splits the park in northern and southern section. With an area of 7.7 ha (19 acres), it is the largest park in the outer neighborhoods and suburbs of Belgrade. The park was completely reconstructed and re-opened on 26 October 2011. It was patterned after the Tašmajdan Park, without the fountain but with added sports terrains.

== The Azbestno Naselje ==
A block of 28 buildings in the central part of Bele Vode was built in 1966 as an experimental complex and a temporary settlement for the next 20 years. However, inhabitants were not resettled after 1986, and in the mid 1990s it was discovered that the buildings were built with the use of cancerous asbestos instead of concrete, thus they were supposed to be emptied after 20 years. Tenants began a campaign for the demolition of the settlement (which became known as the Azbestno Naselje, Serbian for asbestos settlement) claiming deteriorating health and above average cancer occurrence rate (including deaths), as a result of the poisonous asbestos. City government promised help but refused to accept that asbestos is responsible for the health problems of the tenants. However, after over 10 years of protest and campaigning, the demolition of 14 buildings began in June 2006 and was finished by 2011. As the neighborhood is being rebuilt, new streets, parking places and traffic infrastructure will be reconstructed or build. Problem is that buildings with asbestos are a threat for the environment so they can't just be demolished, instead they have to be deconstructed, so the process is very slow. Removing asbestos panels (roof and façade) from one building takes 40 days. The city institute for public health oversees the demolition and measures the concentration of asbestos dust in the air. Panels are removed by hand and constantly watered to prevent the dispersion of dust. They are then packed in a special wrapping material, send to the temporary storehouse in the town of Ruma in the province of Vojvodina, and then sent to Germany for recycling. When the building is completely demolished, a 5 centimeters thick layer of earth beneath is also removed. The new complex was officially named Blok 1 in 2011.

== Gallery ==
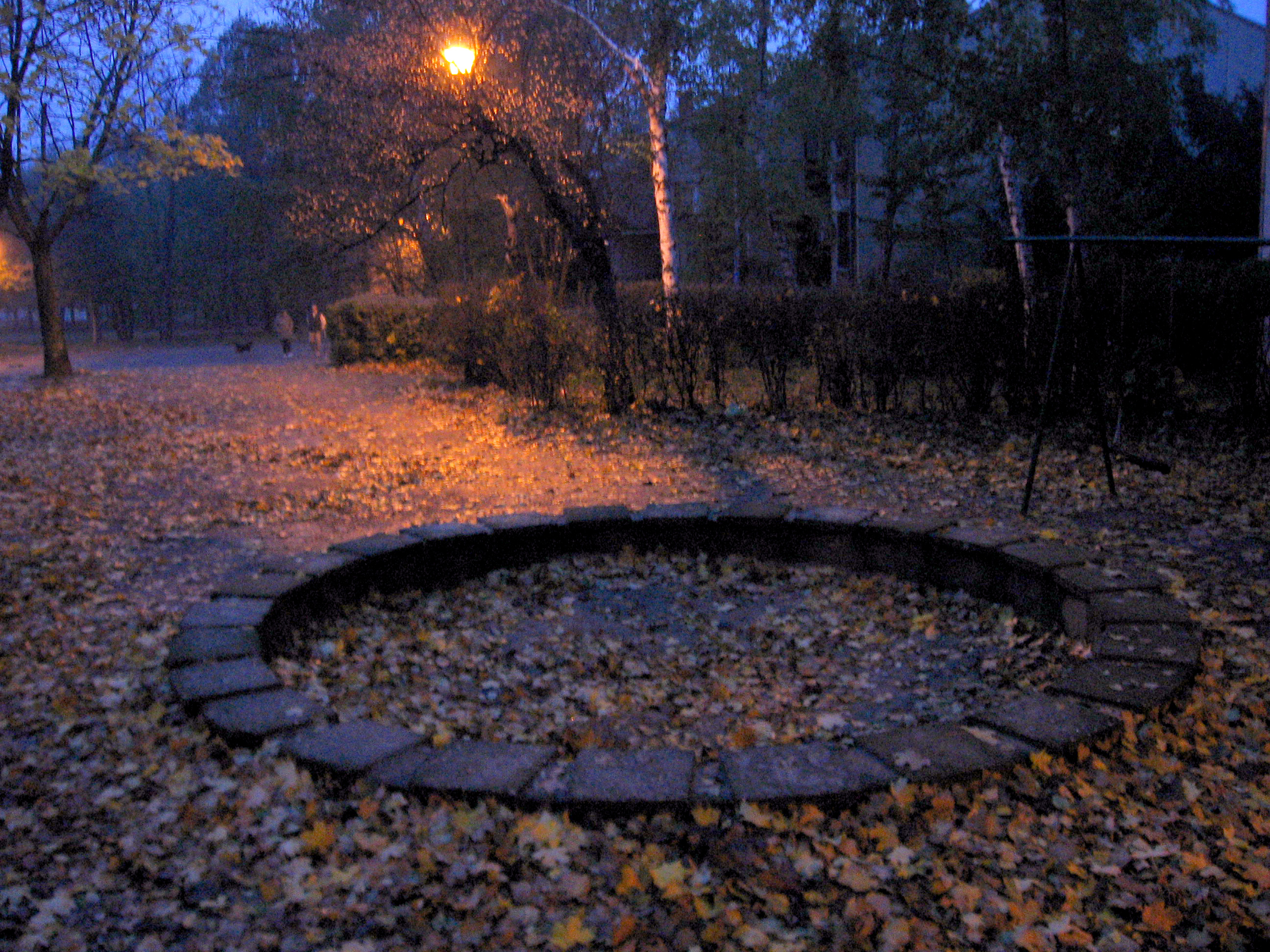
Playground

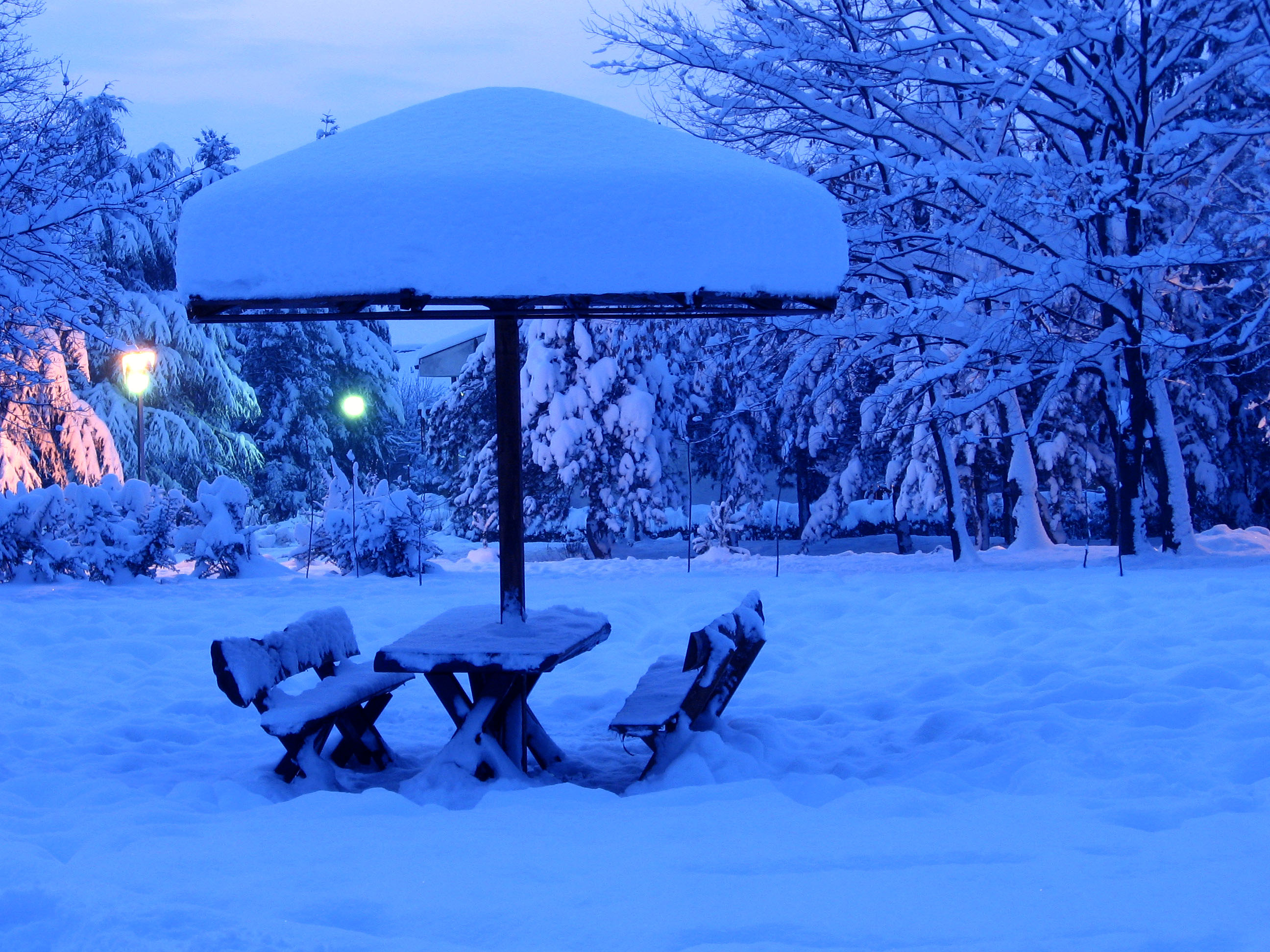
Park during winter

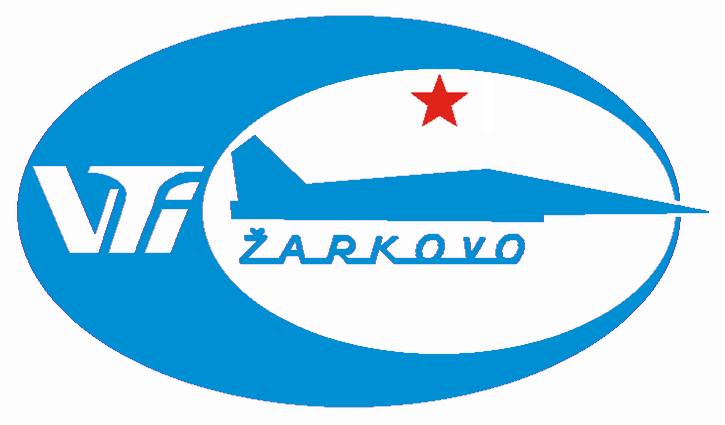
Logo of the Aeronautical Technical Institute (VTI Žarkovo), from its latter days, circa 1990.
