= Čukarica =

Čukarica Чукарица (Serbian)
- Municipality
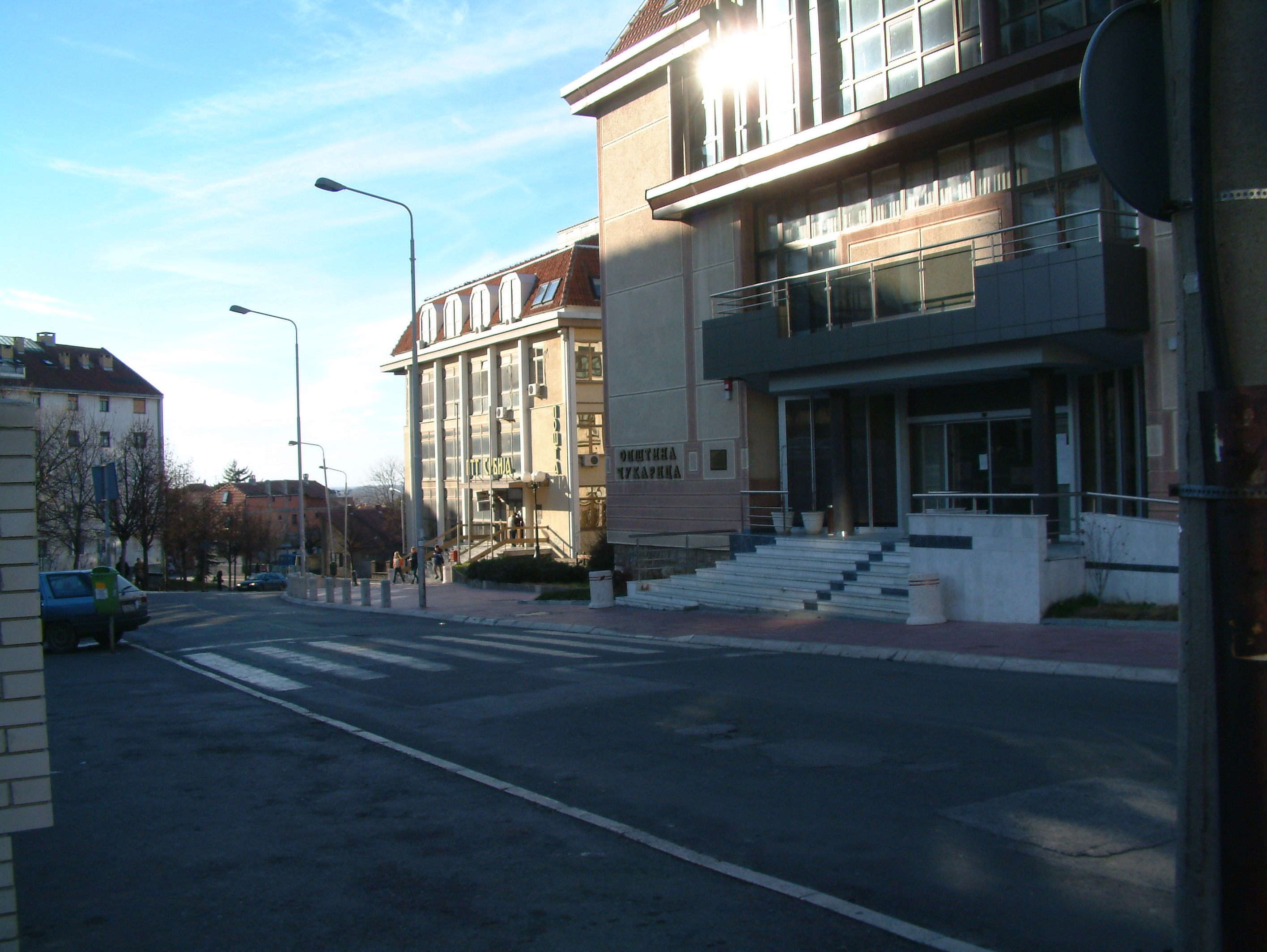

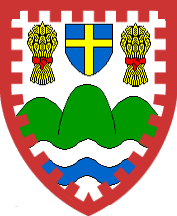
- Coat of arms
- Interactive map of Čukarica
- Coordinates: 44°47′N 20°25′E
- Country: Serbia
- City: Belgrade
- Status: Municipality
- Settlements: 8

Government
  - Type: Municipality of Belgrade
  - Mun. president: Nikola Aritonović (SNS)

Area
  - Total: 157 km^{2} (61 sq mi)

Population (2022)
  - Total: 175,793
  - Density: 1,155/km^{2} (2,990/sq mi)
- Time zone: UTC+1 (CET)
  - Summer (DST): UTC+2 (CEST)
- Postal code: 11030
- Area code: +381(0)11
- Car plates: BG
- Website: www.cukarica.rs

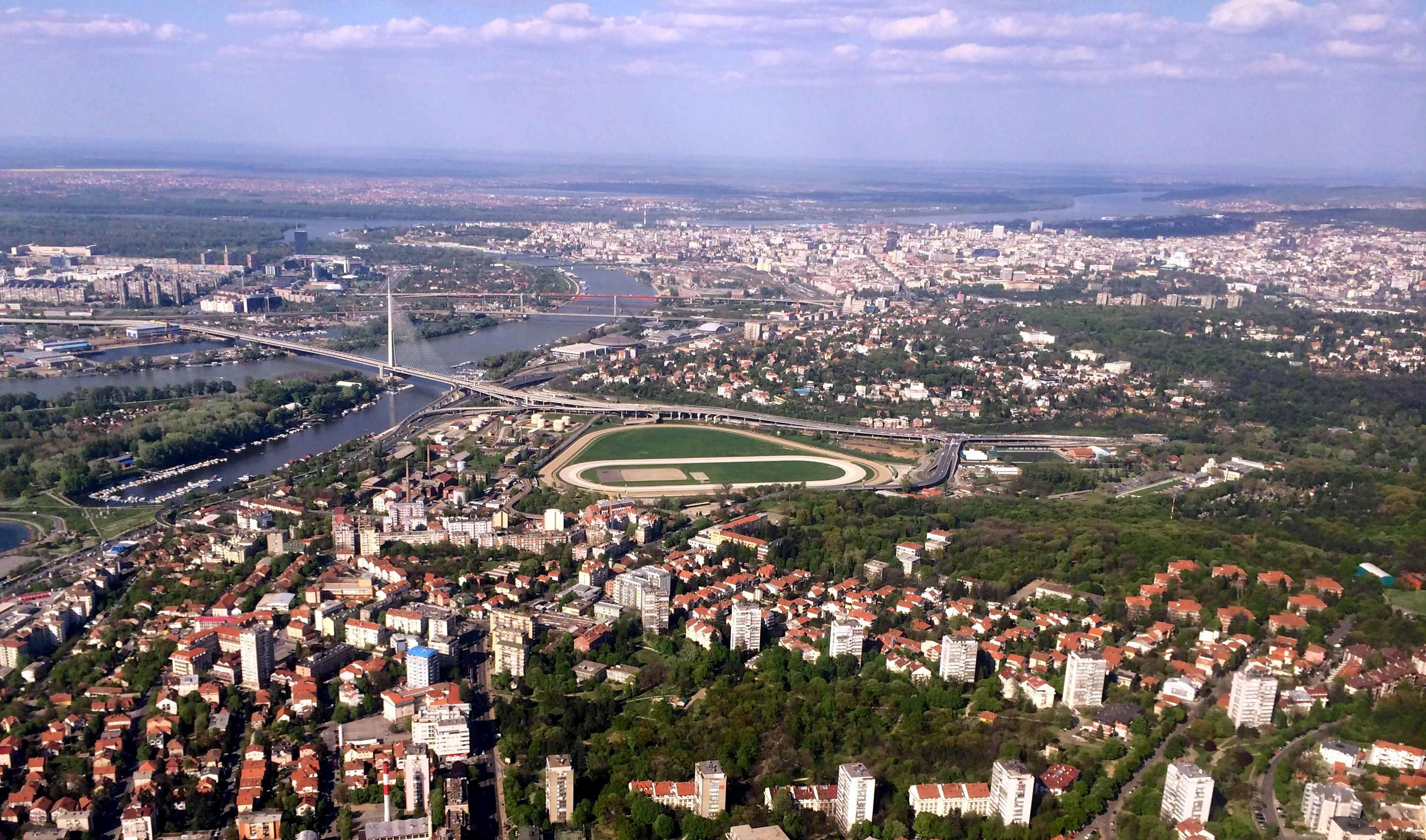
Area around the Sava River and Ada Bridge in Čukarica municipality

Čukarica (Serbian Cyrillic: Чукарица, pronounced [t͡ʃukǎrit͡sa]) is a municipality of the city of Belgrade, Serbia.

== Name ==
Like several other neighborhoods of Belgrade, Čukarica was named after a kafana. At the present location of the Sugar Refinery, there was a kafana in the second half of the 19th century. It was very popular as it was located at the point where two roads, one from Obrenovac and other from Šumadija, meet at the entrance to Belgrade. It was owned by Stojko Čukar and the kafana was named “Čukareva kafana” after him, which later gave name to the settlement.

== History ==
The village of Čukarica asked to be transferred to the Belgrade municipality in 1906, but the plea was rejected. It was transferred from the Vračar srez under the administration of the Belgrade municipality on 8 July 1907. Municipality of Čukarica was established for the first time on 30 December 1911. After a popular referendum, inhabitants of Čukarica voted to split from the municipality of Žarkovo and as a result were given the municipal status by the king Peter I of Serbia. Popular folklore rivalry still exists among the inhabitants of Čukarica and Žarkovo, even though today they are both part of Belgrade.

Modern settlement began to develop as the first social housing for the workers of the sugar refinery, on the hill above the hyppodrome. Čukarica became known as the “workers settlement”. The first president of the municipality was an industrialist with the surname Novak, who emigrated from the Czech Republic. He changed his surname to the Serbian version Novaković and his direct descendants are the actress Olivera Marković (granddaughter) and her son, director Goran Marković (great-grandson).

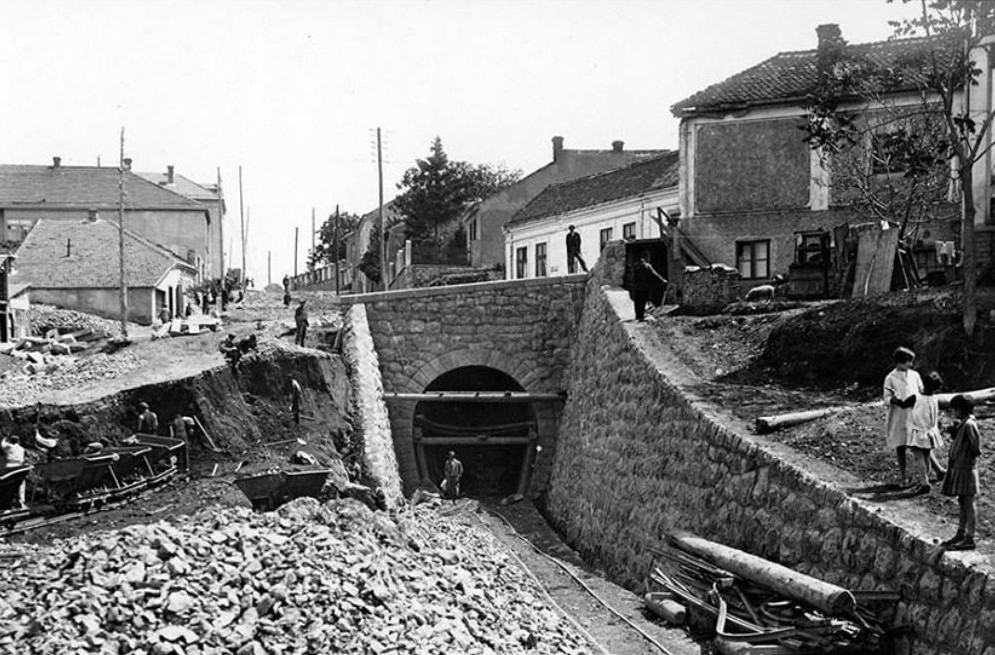
Tunnel construction in Čukarica, 1926-1928

During the existence of the narrow-gauge railway Belgrade-Čukarica-Obrenovac, the tunnel was dug under the ending slope of the Banovo Brdo hill. There were two railway stations. Station Čukarica was located at the entry point from the Belgrade direction, at the sugar factory industrial complex. On the exit side, at Obrenovac Road, there was a station Jedek.

After the liberation in World War I in 1918, Čukarica administratively became part of Belgrade. After World War II when Belgrade municipalities were abolished and the city divided into raions in 1945, Čukarica became one of 5 administrative neighborhoods within Belgrade’s Raion VII. Municipalities were re-established in 1957. In 1960. the neighboring municipalities of Umka and Rakovica were incorporated into Čukarica, but Rakovica became a separate municipality again in 1974.

The Shell company built a large complex of oil tanks during the Interbellum in the northernmost section of Čukarica, Careva Ćuprija. The zone was heavily bombed during the Allied bombing of Yugoslavia in World War II. Especially heavy was the bombing on 3 July 1944. The tanks, and the wider area of old and north parts of Čukarica were carpet bombed, resulting in almost complete destruction of the old core of Čukarica. Rebuilt after the war, the tanks in time became known as the Jugopetrol tanks. As a result of bombing, numerous unexploded bombs remained buried in the ground, and are occasionally discovered during the modern construction works, like Ada Mall in 2018, or residential complex in Banovo Brdo in 2021, which required evacuation of couple of thousands of residents for safe extraction of the projectile.

== Location ==
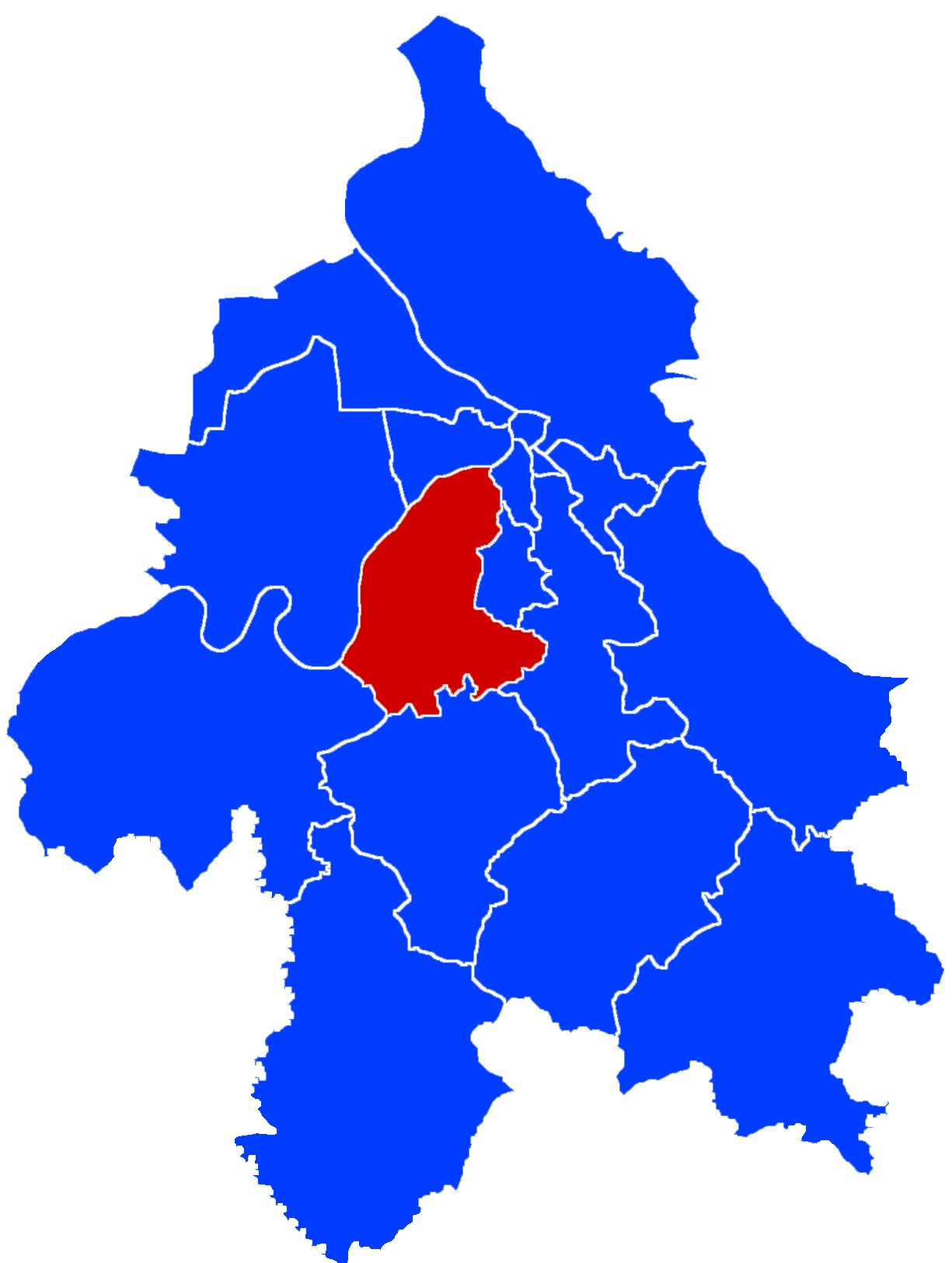
Location of Čukarica within the city of Belgrade

Čukarica is completely surrounded by other municipalities of Belgrade: it is bordered by the Sava river to the west, municipalities of Novi Beograd and Savski Venac to the north and northeast, Rakovica to the east, Voždovac to the southeast, Barajevo to the south, Obrenovac to the southwest and Surčin to the west.

Municipality is located southwest from the downtown Belgrade. It comprises the vast marshy woods of Makiš, on the eastern bank of the Sava river and the largest river island in Belgrade, Ada Ciganlija. At the suburb of Sremčica, Beogradski merokras, the most northern terrain made of limestone (karst) is located.

Several of the most important roads in western Serbia start here: Lazarevac Road, Ibar Highway, Sava Highway, New Obrenovac Road, Old Obrenovac Road, etc. Also, the largest and most important freight train station and marshalling yard in the area (Belgrade marshalling yard) and the main installations of the Belgrade waterworks, including the water factory, are located in the municipality (Makiš).

Čukarica was the first part of Belgrade that developed industry, in the late 19th and early 20th century and still is one of the most industrialized parts of Belgrade (Železnik, Žarkovo, Bele Vode), with commercial sections of the municipalities booming in the last 20 years (Banovo Brdo).

Officially the longest street in Belgrade, Obrenovački put (Obrenovac road) is located in the municipality. According to Belgrade's Directory of Roads, it is 11 kilometers long. However, as the road passes through the forests and mainly uninhabited areas and stretches outside the urban Belgrade City proper (uža teritorija grada), most Belgraders consider the 7.5-kilometer-long Bulevar kralja Aleksandra to be the longest street. While Obrenovac road runs only through one municipality (Čukarica), Bulevar kralja Aleksandra connects four of them: Stari Grad, Vračar, Palilula and Zvezdara.

== Neighborhoods ==
The municipality of Čukarica covers an area of 155 km^{2} (60 sq mi) and it is divided in the urban and suburban part. The urban part of the municipality is completely within the Belgrade City proper, comprising many neighborhoods and sub-neighborhoods, some of which used to be separate towns until the 1970s before Belgrade expanded that much to make urban connection to them (Žarkovo, Železnik). The neighborhood of Čukarica, which gave the name to the entire municipality, is located on a hill above the eastern bank of the Sava river. It is bordered by Careva Ćuprija and Senjak to the north, Banovo Brdo.

This is a list of the neighborhoods that comprise the municipality:

- Ada Ciganlija
- Banovo Brdo
- Bele Vode
- Careva Ćuprija
- Cerak
- Cerak II
- Cerak Vinogradi
- Čukarica
- Čukarička Padina
- Filmski Grad
- Golf Naselje
- Julino Brdo
- Košutnjak
- Makiš
- Novi Železnik
- Orlovača
- Repište
- Rupčine
- Stari Cerak
- Sunčana Padina
- Sporski Centar
- Žarkovo
- Žarkovo Selo
- Železnik
- Železnik Selo

The suburban part comprises seven suburban settlements, four of them classified as urban and three as rural settlements:

- Urban:
- Ostružnica
- Umka
- Velika Moštanica
- Rural:
- Gorica
- Rušanj
- Sremčica
- Pećani
- Rucka

== Demographics ==
Historical population
Year	Pop.	±% p.a.
1948	29,028	—
1953	33,443	+2.87%
1961	50,581	+5.31%
1971	102,254	+7.29%
1981	132,123	+2.60%
1991	154,632	+1.59%
2002	168,508	+0.78%
2011	181,231	+0.81%

The municipality has a population of 181,231 inhabitants, according to the 2011 census results. That makes Čukarica the second most populous municipality of Belgrade (after New Belgrade), but it is also the fastest growing one in terms of absolute growth of population (relative, about 1.05% annually). Despite having also a rural parts, the municipality is very densely populated – 1,155/km^{2} (2,990/sq mi).

=== Ethnic groups ===
The ethnic composition of the municipality:

Ethnic group	Population
Serbs	166,258
Romani	3,163
Montenegrins	1,137
Macedonians	794
Croats	713
Yugoslavs	648
Gorani	352
Muslims	242
Hungarians	164
Bulgarians	155
Bosniaks	137
Russians	120
Albanians	108
Slovenians	156
Others	7,084
Total	181,231

== Economy ==
The following table gives a preview of total number of registered people employed in legal entities per their core activity (as of 2018):

Activity	Total
Agriculture, forestry and fishing	49
Mining and quarrying	29
Manufacturing	5,451
Electricity, gas, steam and air conditioning supply	314
Water supply; sewerage, waste management and remediation activities	1,379
Construction	2,483
Wholesale and retail trade, repair of motor vehicles and motorcycles	9,204
Transportation and storage	3,126
Accommodation and food services	1,576
Information and communication	2,081
Financial and insurance activities	1,083
Real estate activities	146
Professional, scientific and technical activities	2,719
Administrative and support service activities	2,269
Public administration and defense; compulsory social security	1,345
Education	2,807
Human health and social work activities	2,442
Arts, entertainment and recreation	895
Other service activities	1,053
Individual agricultural workers	25
Total	40,475

== Sports ==
As of the 2025/26 season, local football club FK Čukarički play in Serbia's top tier, the Serbian SuperLiga.

== Politics ==
Presidents of the Municipality since 1989:

- 1989 – 1992: Predrag Petrović (b. 1950)
- 1992 – Feb 1997: Vladimir Matić (b. 1957)
- February 1997 – 18 November 2004: Zoran Alimpić (b. 1965)
- 18 November 2004 – 23 June 2008: Dragan Tešić (b. 1960)
- 23 June 2008 – 6 June 2012: Milan Tlačinac (b. 1964)
- 6 June 2012 – 19 March 2014: Zoran Gajić (b. 1967)
- 19 March 2014 – present : Srđan Kolarić (b. 1965)

== Twin towns - sister cities ==
Čukarica is twinned with:

- Bač, Serbia
- Berane, Montenegro
- Budva, Montenegro
- Ervenik, Croatia
- Heraklion, Greece
- Istočno Novo Sarajevo, Bosnia and Herzegovina
- Kumanovo, North Macedonia
- Sykies, Greece
- Thasos, Greece

== See also ==
- Subdivisions of Belgrade
- List of Belgrade neighborhoods and suburbs
