= Košutnjak =

Park-forest and neighborhood of Belgrade

- Кошутњак
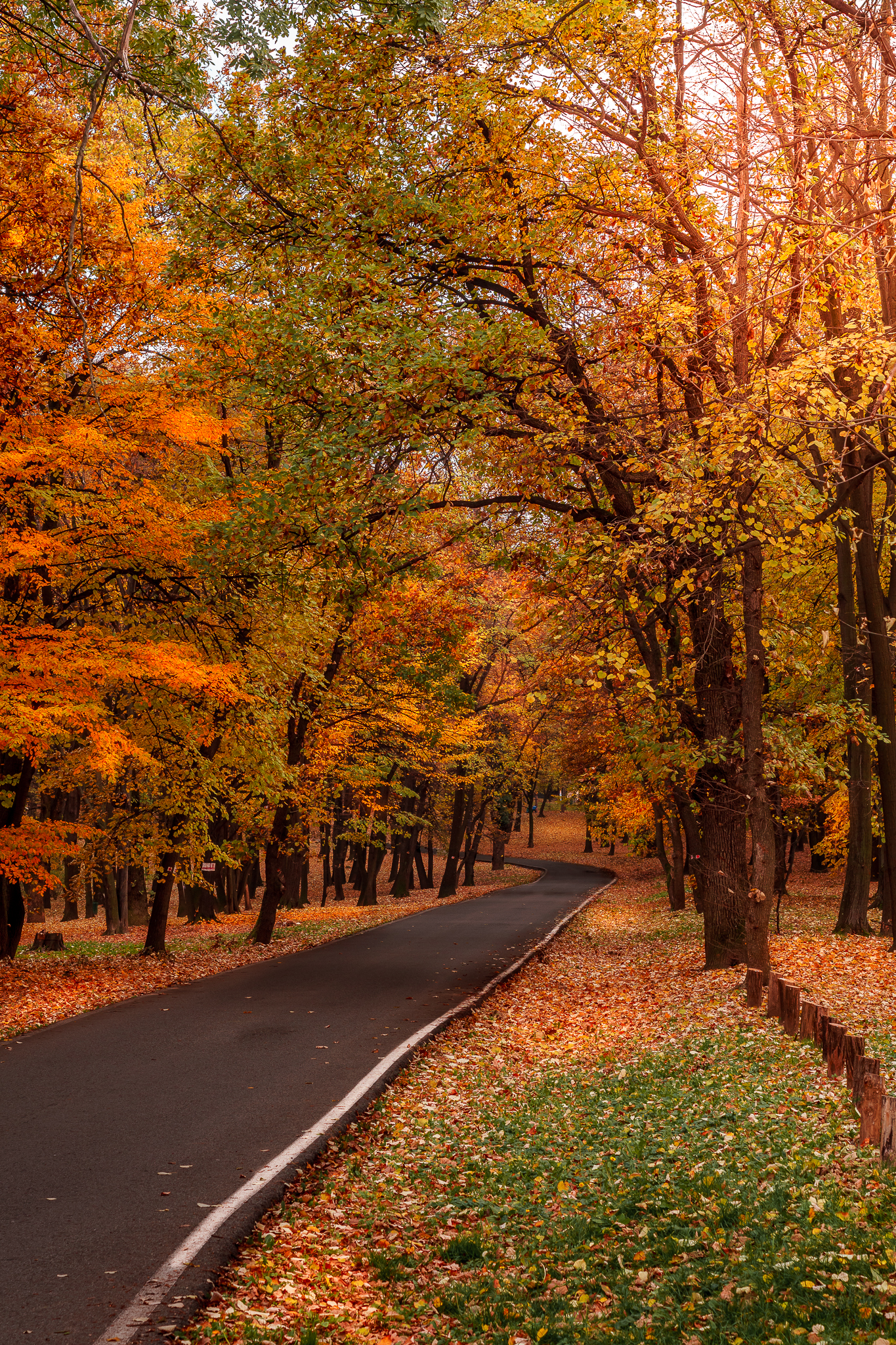
- Autumn in Košutnjak

- Location within Belgrade
- Location: Rakovica, Belgrade
- Coordinates: 44°46′00″N 20°26′06″E
- Open: Open all year

Košutnjak (Serbian Cyrillic: Кошутњак, pronounced [kǒʃutɲaːk]) is a park-forest and urban neighborhood of Belgrade, the capital of Serbia. It is divided between in the municipalities of Čukarica (upper and central parts) and Rakovica (lower part). With the adjoining Topčider, it is colloquially styled "Belgrade's oxygen factory". The 1923 Belgrade's general plan, in which one of the main projects regarding the green areas was forestation of the area between Topčider and the city, envisioned a continuous green area Senjak – Topčidersko Brdo – Hajd Park – Topčider – Košutnjak, which was formed by the 1930s. This continual forested area makes the largest "green massif" in the immediate vicinity of Belgrade's urban tissue.

== Etymology ==
The name, košutnjak, is derived from the medieval hunting forests of the Serbian nobility, meaning doe's breeder. (In Serbian, košuta means doe, hind), as does used to live freely in the park until the World War I. The name was mentioned for the first time in 1831.

== Geography ==
The Košutnjak hill is 250 m (820 ft) high and the entire forest complex covers an area of 330 ha (820 acres).

Košutanjak has a few geological natural monuments. They include several Cretaceous maritime ridges of "Burdelj", "Tasin Majdan" and "Baremski", on the location of the assassination of the prince Michael, and a geology profile where the mint is located today.

== Location ==
Košutnjak is located 6 km southwest from the downtown Belgrade. It is bordered by the neighborhoods of Topčider to the north and west, Kanarevo Brdo to the northwest, Rakovica and Skojevsko Naselje to the south, and Žarkovo (with its extensions of Cerak, Cerak II, Repište) and Banovo Brdo (with its extension of Sunčana Padina) to the east. Filmski Grad (to the southwest) and Golf Naselje (to the northwest) are sub-neighborhoods of Košutnjak.

== History ==
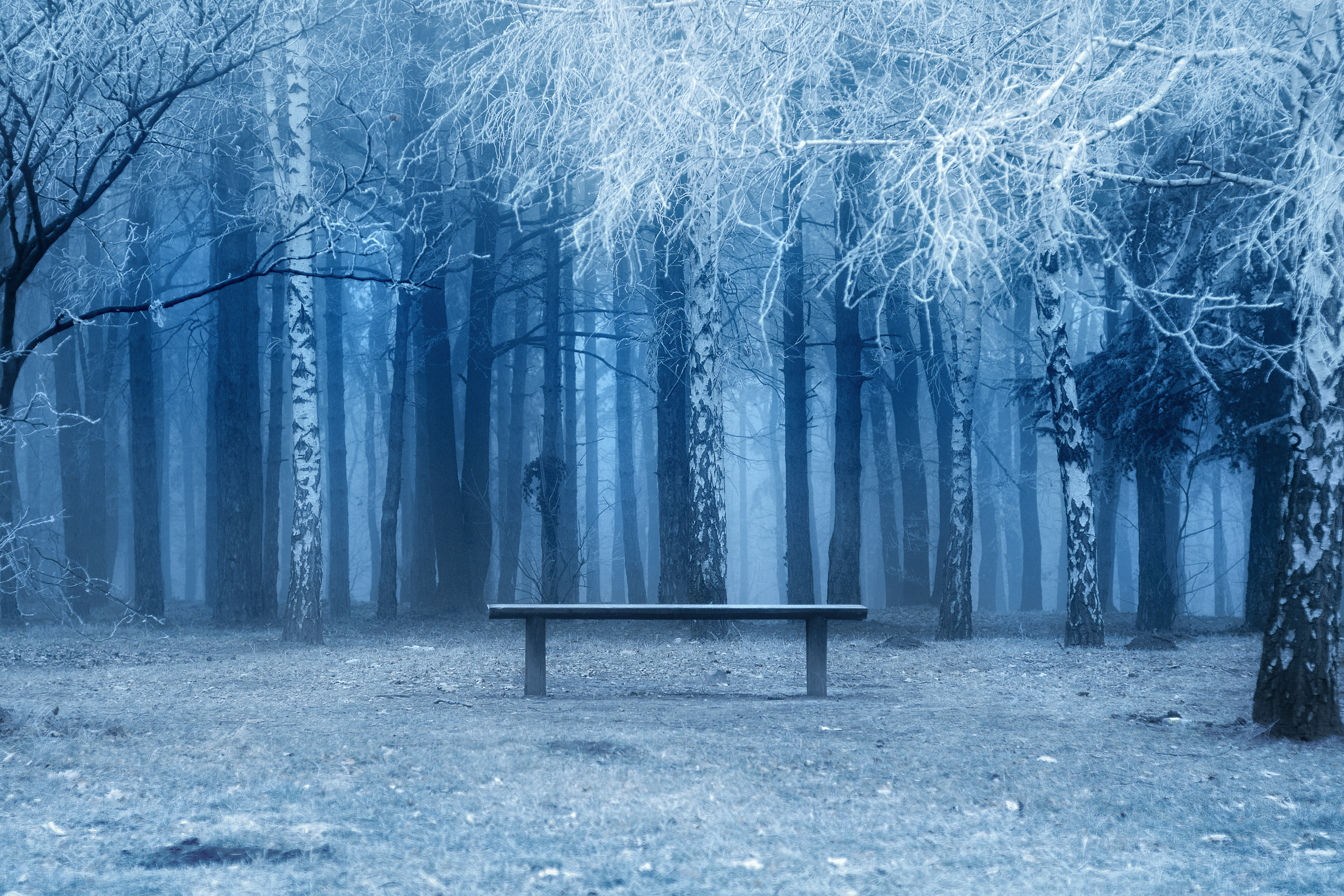
Winter in Košutnjak

In the 19th century, Košutnjak was a fenced hunting ground and royal excursion place for the members of the Obrenović dynasty. Engineer, urbanist and professor at the Belgrade Lyceum, Atanasije Nikolić, was given a task of arranging the forest. He also arranged the neighboring Topčider Park and its nursery garden, and avenues along city's main streets and squares. Until the World War I, the area was under quality oak forest. A document from 1849 says that there were 48 deer in Košutnjak, 13 bulls and 35 does. In 1884 the first railway in Serbia, which connected Belgrade and Niš, was constructed through the forest. In 1908 Belgian architect Alban Chambon drafted a new general urban plan (GUP) in 1908 which made Košutnjak a public park.

Košutnjak gained a sort of historical notoriety as prince of Serbia, Mihailo Obrenović III and his cousin Anka Konstantinović were assassinated while walking in the park on 10 June [O.S. 29 May] 1868, and when Ivan Stambolić, Slobodan Milošević's political opponent was abducted from the park on 25 August 2000 and later assassinated and buried at Fruška Gora. There are also remnants of the German cemetery and the monuments to the Serbian soldiers erected by their adversaries, German soldiers, in World War I.

After the assassination of prince Mihailo, the Board for the erection of the monument was formed already on 14 June 1868 and decided to collect donations for the construction of both the memorial church in Košutnjak, at the assassination location, and a monumental sculpture in the city itself. Russian sculptor Mikhail Mikeshin drafted the design for the memorial church or chapel in Košutnjak. After the public display, the citizens apparently liked the design and approved the construction. Painter Stevan Todorović ordered the lithographs to be made in Vienna. However, the process of building the memorials dragged on, and in 1871 Mikeshin's propositions were rejected. Also in 1871, the government opted to build only the monument in the city, which resulted in the Prince Mihailo Monument at the modern Republic Square. The memorial, simply marking the spot, was later set in Košutnjak. It was renovated in 1912 and 2020.

In 1903, former royal hunting ground was opened for public, making Košutanjak an excursion area of Belgrade. The first summer sanatorium for the city children in Serbia was opened in Košutnjak. In 1911, Ministry of Construction devised the plan for the cart and pedestrian roads grid, spreading from Topčider railway station to the wide meadow on one of Košutnjak's plateaus. On this location, Pionirski Grad is located today. The 1923 Belgrade's general plan envisioned forestation of Topčidersko Brdo and Senjak, formation of the new park and establishment of the continuous green area with the Topčider and Košutnjak. Project started in 1926 while the Hyde Park was finished in the 1930s.

Until World War II, the pheasants were abundant too and in this period Košutnjak was a healing destination for many city children. After 1945 city urbanists considered the way Topčider-Košutnjak complex has been handled was wrong, especially the expansion of the railway station into the marshalling yard and construction of Filmski Grad (both especially hurt Košutnjak's appeal), so the Belgrade's GUP in the 1950s projected the complete removal of the railway objects from the Topčider valley, but that was never executed.

After Belgrade was declared a national skiing center, Košutnjak was one of the locations where ski pistes were built. The selected terrain began at the German cemetery and went downhill to the bottom of the Serbian cemetery. The piste was 300 m (980 ft) long and 30 m (98 ft) wide. By 1936, a 40 m (130 ft) ski jumping hill was built. After World War II, before skiing facilities were built on the mountains further from Belgrade, the slopes of Košutnjak (so as of Kalemegdan, Banovo Brdo and Avala), continued to be used by Belgraders for skiing. The slope is still recognisable in the hill's landscape and on top if it is a cafe-restaurant called "Ski staza" ("ski piste").

From June 1945 to December 1946, Košutnjak was one of 5 administrative neighborhoods within Belgrade's Raion VII.

In the 1980s, Košutnjak hosted one of the most popular Belgrade's disco clubs, "Panorama".

== Wildlife ==
=== Plants ===
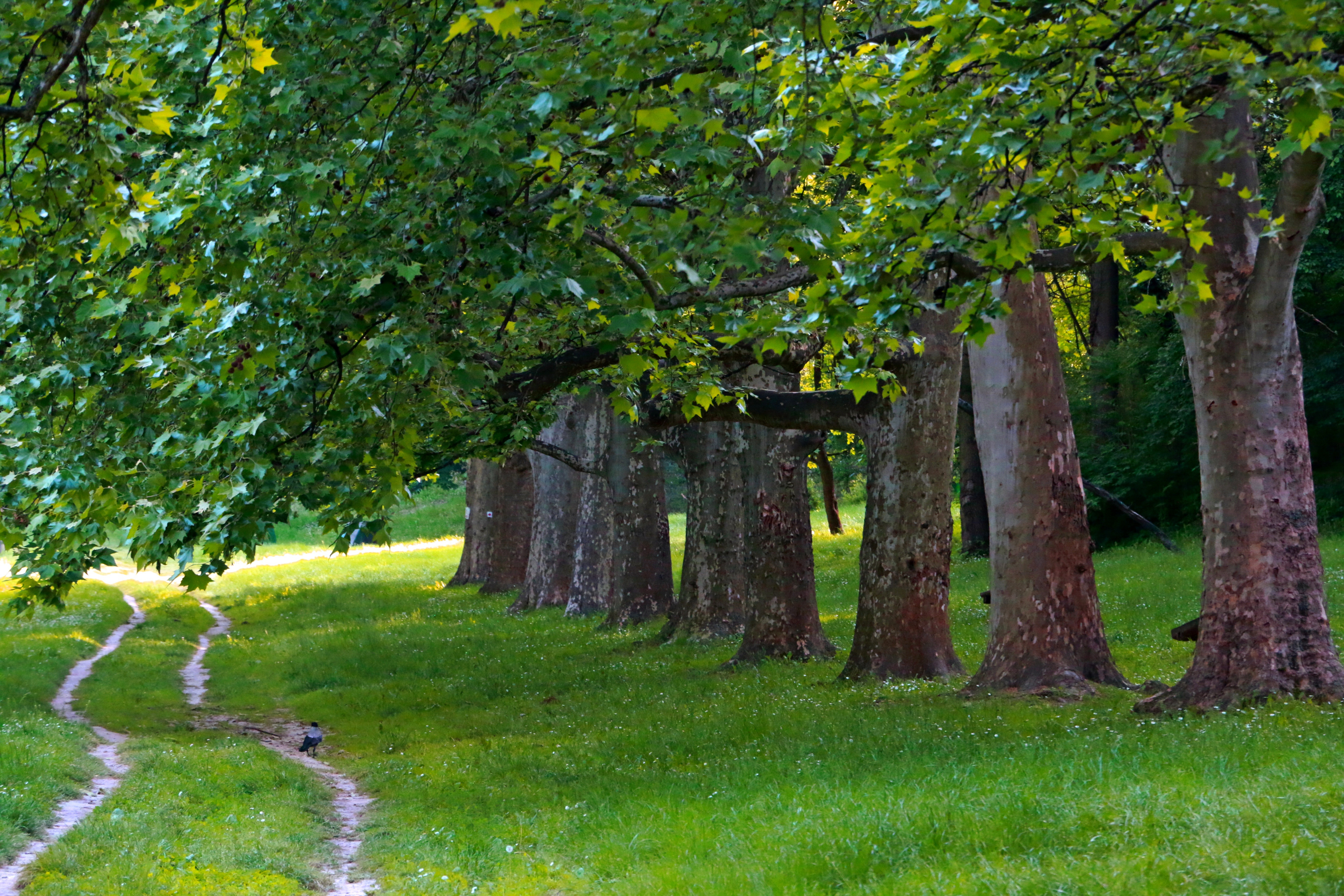
Platanus trees

Košutnjak is home to many plant and animal species, some of which are under strict protection. There are 521 plant species, including lime tree, pedunculate oak, common hornbeam, Turkey oak, Hungarian oak, European yew, sweet chestnut, cherry laurel, hackberry and Turkish hazel. About 5% of the forest is inhabited by the conifers, mostly cedar, black pine and white pine. In 2015, an average age of the trees has been estimated to 60–70 years. Also in 2015, about 50 ha (120 acres) of Košutnjak has been re-forested with 4,400 seedlings of the common ash and sycamore.

=== Animals ===
Animals inhabiting the forest are squirrels, hedgehogs, woodpeckers and bats.

Košutnjak hosts an experimental apiary, named after the forest. In May 2020 it was estimated that more than 3,000 honey bee swarms are orphaned in Belgrade, roaming around the city, trying to nest in rain gutters, under the eaves or even in residential houses, so the project of the bee sanctuaries construction within the complex was completed in July.

== Importance ==
Košutnjak is one of the most popular recreational places in Belgrade. With 40 ha (99 acres), Sports Center Košutnjak is one of the largest and most diverse in the city (stadiums, pools, etc.), while the park also has an auto-camp, modern settlements of Filmski Grad and Pionirski Grad, big studios of the national broadcaster Radio Television of Serbia, many popular restaurants and arranged paths criss-crossing the forest. There are also jogging tracks and a ski run.

In the lower parts, Košutnjak and Topčider forests grew together, while in the upper parts they are divided by the river Topčiderska reka and a railway passing through the river's valley (both Košutnjak and Topčider have their own, separate train stations).

Nobelist author Ivo Andrić wrote: "You just hang on to Topčider and Košutnjak...Topčider is my favorite place, where I ate bread and drank wine in the sweetest and calmest manner". Andrić's longtime friend, painter Leposava Bela Pavlović, made two paintings of Košutnjak in 1943. One, titled "Košutnjak, 1943" just shows the nature and is today exhibited in the Memorial museum of Ivo Andrić. On the other one, "In Košutnjak during the occupation" she painted Andrić, Milica Babić-Jovanović (Andrić's future wife) and Nenad Jovanović. This painting is in the National Museum of Serbia.

== Protection ==
In 2014, city government declared "Košutnjak Forest" as a protected area, or nature monument. Protected locality covers an area of 265.26 ha (655.5 acres). Košutnjak is the natural reserve of pedunculate oak, common hornbeam and silver lime.

However, in the late 2010s, state and government authorities began extensive construction works in the forest, cutting dozens of trees. Residents at first tried to remove the construction fencing, but later stormed the construction sites, following the skirmishes with the police, and halted the works temporarily including blocking of the unmarked trucks without license plates which transported cut wood. Protest marches were also organized, so as blocking of the local Čukarica Municipality Hall. Objections also include claims that many of the objects already exist in the vicinity and that there are better locations, adjoining the existing sports center, where the cutting of the trees wouldn't be necessary.

One site is chosen as the location for the expanded "Košutnjak" sports center, in the 33,000 m^{2} (360,000 sq ft) large part of the forest which has been groomed since the 1960s. Expansion includes 15 m (49 ft) tall martial arts hall, expansion of the "Trim" hotel, bungalows, additional 4 tennis courts, shooting range, indoor swimming pool, 207 parking spots and access streets. Government claims the project will cost €12 million, out of which €1,2 million is for the artificial climbing rock, which, due to the price, gained negative media prominence. Authorities also claimed that only 20 trees would be cut but 100 new ones would be planted; however, some 60 pine trees were cut. The complex was set to finish in early 2021, but the deadline was then moved to March 2022, with city now claiming that only 10 trees were cut, but "500 new ones were planted".

Concurrently, trees were cut on the opposite slope, between the ski run and the Topčider cemetery. After the residents occupied the area, city stated that they are replacing trees with the new and healthy ones. Cutting of the trees came as the continuation of the constant cutting of the trees in Belgrade, including the neighborhood of Ušće and the Kalemegdan Park. Goran Trivan, Minister of Environmental Protection, said that citizens are overdramatizing as the "tree is a renewable resource". As the cutting continued, and protests grew, it was discovered that the company officially entrusted with the cutting of the trees, belongs to one of the top city officials and member of the ruling Serbian Progressive Party, chief city urbanist Marko Stojčić. His company was the only bidder. After this was made public, a 2017 document which confirmed this was swiftly removed from the site of the Institute for Sports, which is in charge of the project. It was also made public that the cut trees have been transported to the house of a local representative and member of the same party, who claimed that he "paid for it".

Stojčić originally disputed the 2017 document before later acknowledging its existence, but claimed that he was awarded the job already in 2014, refusing to provide any documentation. He claimed he held no office at the time, either in the city or the party, however in 2014 he was already member of the city's Planning Commission and of the City Urban Council, so he basically awarded the job to himself. Stojčić added that he sees no issue here.

In February 2020, citizens again protested as they noticed continued massive tree cutting. State company "Srbijašume", which administers forests, claimed that this was planned and controlled cutting of the forest in the areas where trees reached 70 years of age. The affected territory covers 2.75 ha (6.8 acres) and it was claimed that 5,400 new seedlings will be planted instead.

In June 2020, plans for further, massive reduction of the forest were announced. City's detailed regulatory plan for the Filmski Grad neighborhood, which occupies the entire southwest section of Košutnjak, includes construction of the new residential complex for 8,000 people, with numerous luxurious dwellings and expensive hotels. It also includes cutting of the 17 ha (42 acres) of forest, which will from 27 ha (67 acres) be reduced to 10 ha (25 acres) in two separated forested pockets. The planned objects will cover almost 10 times more area than they do now. Entire plan actually covers 87 ha (210 acres), of which 40 ha (99 acres), where the forest is located, belongs to the investor, private "Avala Studios" company. The investor then stated they will keep only 7 ha (17 acres) of forest, because everything else is "worthless" and that forest doesn't exist. City officials either said it was too early to assess the situation (chief urbanist Stojčić) or openly, with all the evidence and statements to the contrary, said that everything is a lie and that forest will not be cut (deputy mayor Goran Vesić). As the project includes revitalization of Filmski Grad film studios, the city plan also claims that development of film industry in this area is one of the government's priority, but the government made no such decision.

This section of the forest is not protected. Citizens, already annoyed by the policy of the present administration to cut trees all over the urbanized city area and organized in various groups, coordinated protests and petitions, accusing city officials of hiding behind the COVID-19 pandemic to push bad and corruptive projects. They cite the investors alleged interest in revitalizing the film studio, but adding ten times more residential and commercial space, with massive garages and private sports complexes, on some of the most expensive city ground. The investor claim that for "every tree we cut, we will plant three on some other location in the city" and that construction will start in 2021. Serbian section of Europa Nostra, pan-European umbrella organization for Europe's cultural and natural heritage, examined the plan, stating that the film studios are only used as the pretext for the massive luxurious construction and that projects is opposed to the public interest. They also suggested that the investor should be obliged to only reconstruct existing objects, not to enlarge them tenfold.

Over 30,000 citizens signed the petition, while experts teams, which included four deans and heads of Belgrade University's faculties and institutes, lodged over 7,000 complaints to the city. They stressed that even the green areas of less quality must be preserved. City responded by informal confirmation that the project will not be changed and by banning the public inspection of this, and all other plans, citing COVID-19 pandemic, just one day after the petition was filed.

== Features ==
=== Aerial lift ===
In 1922 company "Čavlina and Sladoljev" from Zagreb drafted the project of connecting two banks of the Sava river by the cable car. In 1928, building company "Šumadija" again proposed the construction of the cable car, which they called "air tram" but this project was planned to connect Zemun to Kalemegdan on Belgrade Fortress, via Great War Island. The interval of the cabins was set at 2 minutes and the entire route was supposed to last 5 minutes. The project was never realized. Engineer and CEO of the Yugoslav institute for urbanism and dwelling "Juginus", Mirko Radovanac, revived the idea in the 1990s. After conducting extensive surveys (traffic analysis, interviews with the commuters, climatic, geological, urban and other researches), "Juginus" presented the project in 1993. They proposed that the termini should be at the Sports Center Košutnjak and Block 44 in the neighborhood of Savski Blokovi in New Belgrade, across the Sava. Stops in between would include the major public transportation roundabout in Banovo Brdo, Makiš and Ada Ciganlija, five in total. They called it the "ideal route". The plan also included construction of commercial areas around the termini, which would cover 2,000 m^{2} (22,000 sq ft) and help with the profitability of the project.

Apart from being ecological and an attraction, it was estimated that it would shorten the trip for 45 minutes. City government included the project into the city's GUP, which envisioned the construction in phases, the first being a 1,000 m (3,300 ft) long section Block 44-Ada Ciganlija. It would lay on 8 steel pillars, 35 m (115 ft) above the ground and the trip would last for 3 minutes. The cabins were projected to receive not just the commuters, but also the bicycles, skateboards, sledges and skis, as the cableway was planned to work year-round. The complete facility would have 27 pillars; it would be 5 km (3.1 mi) long which would be travelled in 15 minutes by 2,000 commuters per hour.

Despite the project being publicly revived by the mayors Dragan Đilas (2008–2013) and Siniša Mali (2013–2018), as of 2021 the project still hasn't started. The idea was then included in the Belgrade's General Regulatory Plan in December 2021, consisting of two phases: New Belgrade-Ada Ciganlija-Makiš, and Makiš-Banovo Brdo-Košutnjak. After announcing relocation of the Belgrade Zoo to Ada Ciganlija in February 2023, mayor Aleksandar Šapić announced that the project was greenlighted, stating that previously publicly unknown city project from 2009 will be reactivated.

=== Arboretum ===
A new building of the Faculty of Forestry was built in 1956, right above Careva Ćuprija, where the northwest section of the vast wood of Košutnjak begins at an altitude of 110–125 meters. Professors and students began developing a dendrology collection in 1957, which grew into the Arboretum of the Faculty of Forestry, a specific botanical garden which was protected by the state in July 2011 as the natural monument. It is used as an open-air classroom, for the practical studies of the students but also by scientists for their work. The arboretum has a nursery garden and a greenhouse. On 6.7 hectares, the arboretum holds 2,000 individual specimen of 300 trees and shrubs. They include 218 deciduous and 24 conifer species, out of which 80 are ornamental, and 40 species of perennial plants. There are 77 domestic and 146 foreign species, including: narrow-leafed ash, Balkan maple, Balkan forsythia, laburnum, giant sequoia, cedar, cherry laurel (new variety developed in arboretum), Himalayan pine and the oldest metasequoia in Belgrade.

=== Hajdučka Česma ===
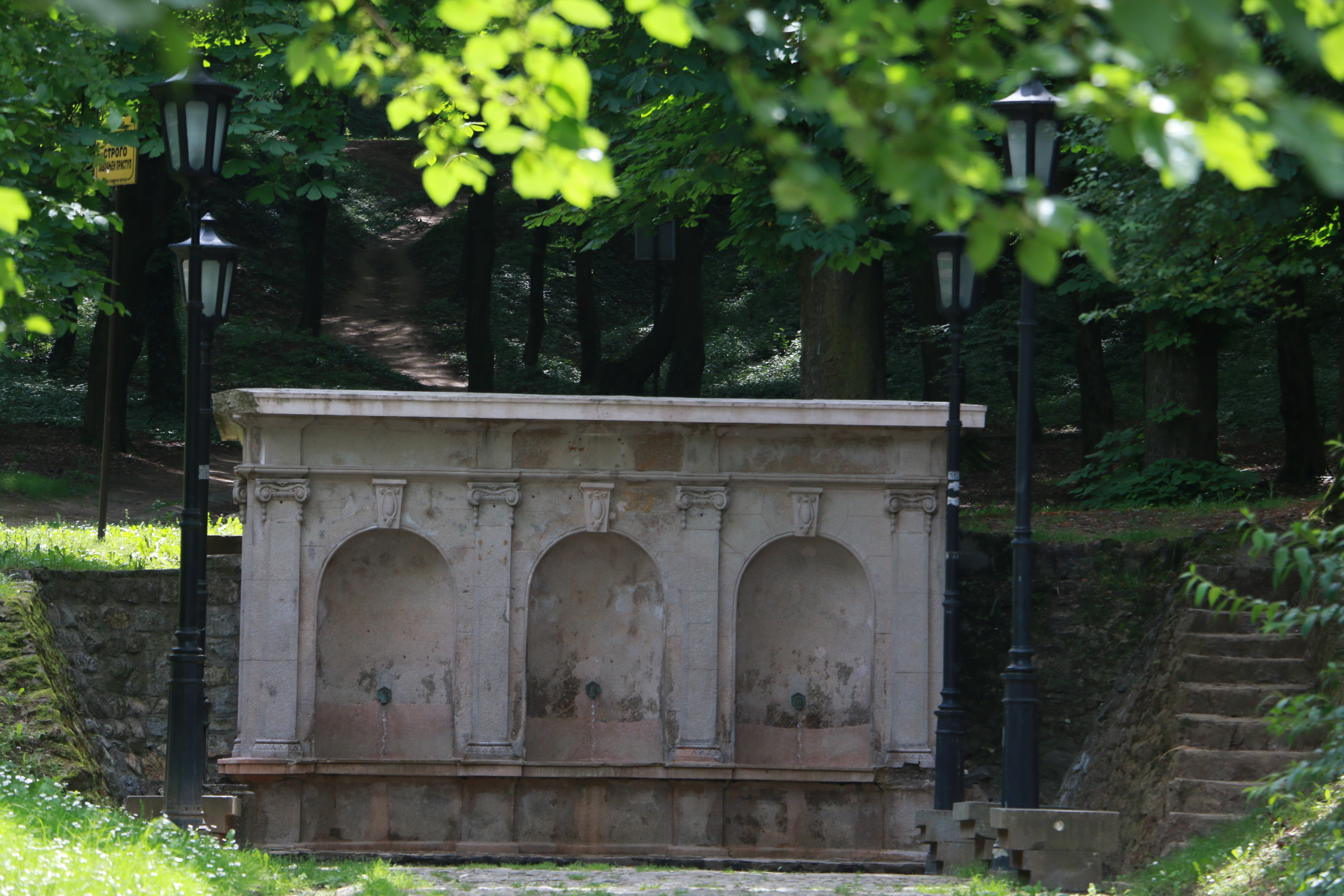
Hajdučka Česma

Hajdučka česma (Hajduks' drinking fountain) is a natural spring, which is one of the most prominent destinations for the picnickers, especially as the most popular location of the traditional Prvomajski uranak ("Labour Day early outing"), celebration of May 1, Labour Day, in Belgrade.

The Terazije Fountain, located in Terazije, the central city square, was planned for relocation in March 1911 due to the planned massive reconstruction of the square. City administration decided to move it to the Hajdučka Česma, or somewhere within the city limits, at some respected location. The fountain was to be moved in its entirety and transformed into the "flower vase". In the end, the fountain was moved to Topčider in 1912, but was returned to Terazije in 1975.

Close to the spring, there was a clash between the gendarmes and Belgrade students on 8 September 1930. During the Communist period this date was accepted as the Belgrade's Youth Organization holiday. Marking the 40th anniversary, a memorial plaque was placed in 1970 to commemorate the event. It is work of sculptor Milorad Tepavac.

Several rock concerts were held at the fountain, including bands Siluete in 1969, and Pop Mašina in 1972 and 1973, when, as an opening act, performed Goran Bregović's band Jutro, precursor of Bijelo Dugme. On 28 August 1977 a spectacular concert of the rock group Bijelo Dugme was held. With an attendance of over 100,000, it is considered as one of the seminal events in the history of Yugoslav rock, a social phenomenon which in time developed into the myth. It was organized after the idea of the journalist and rock critic Petar Peca Popović, to promote, at time sagging career, of Bijelo Dugme. The attendance was free, and the official occasion was Bregović's departure to serve his army duty. Audio footage was partially used for the band's live album Koncert kod Hajdučke česme ("Concert at Hajdučka Česma").

=== Military cemetery ===
After fierce fighting in the World War I, German occupation army conquered Belgrade in October 1915. German commander, Generalfeldmarschall August von Mackensen, order for the dead soldiers to be buried on the hill above Banovo Brdo. Amazed by the bravery of the Serbian soldiers who defended the city, Mackensen order for Serbian dead soldiers to be buried in the center of the cemetery: bodies of 36 Serbian soldiers from the 7th Infantry Regiment, one British and one French soldier were surrounded by the bodies of 2,600 German soldiers. This act surprised even Mackensen's subordinated officers. Above each grave there was a cross with information about the deceased, from their military papers. He also erected three monuments. Two were for the German soldiers while the third one, shaped like a simple stone block says in Serbian and German language: "Here rest Serbian heroes, 1915".

When German emperor Wilhelm II arrived in Belgrade in 1916, a large stone bench was built for him by the German soldiers. So as the monument, it was made from the marble which Belgrade municipality purchased in 1911 and which was planned for the reconstruction of the central city square Terazije and the Terazije fountain. The bench was placed on the point on the hill from which the emperor could see the entire Belgrade below. Hermann Göring, then president of the Third Reich's Reichstag, visited the cemetery on 17 May 1934, during his visit to Yugoslavia, laying a wreath with inscription "to war comrades, Reichsminister of Aviation, Hermann Göring".

By the 21st century, the cemetery deteriorated a lot. One monument to the German soldiers is in bad shape and it is believed that the Serbian soldiers were transferred to the joint ossuary for the World War I soldiers in the Belgrade New Cemetery. The other German monument is today within the yard of a privately owned school, while Belgrade is no more visible from the spot as the Košutnjak forest expanded and completely engulfed the area. The only remaining visible mark of the cemetery itself is part of the fence.

== Sub-neighborhoods ==
=== Pionirski Grad ===
Pionirski Grad (Serbian: Пионирски град, pronounced [piǒniːrskiː ɡrâːd]) is a sub-neighborhood of Košutnjak, in its south-central section, which belongs to the municipality of Rakovica. It is a small weekend-settlement, without permanent population, just west of the neighborhood of Filmski Grad. The name, pionirski grad in Serbian means "pioneer's town".

First objects were built during the period of German occupation in World War II. An anti-aircraft unit of Luftwaffe was placed in the area in 1943. The soldiers built small houses in Alpine style on the glades, with typical cornices and Bavarian windows. In the surrounding area they dug numerous underground bunkers which are today decaying and are mostly covered with overgrowth. Those which are outside of the woods are occasionally rediscovered during construction works. After the war, architect Ratko Tatić developed the settlement, starting in the summer of 1946. The settlement was opened for public in 1949. Majority of the complex got its present look in the 1960s. The central, multi-functional building with the adjoining substation transformer, was finished in 1976. Numerous underground shelters survived.

Pionirski Grad covers an area of 36.5 ha (90 acres) and is a non-residential settlement completely surrounded by the woods of Košutnjak. There are 9 pavilions with a total area of 200 m^{2} (2,200 sq ft). They were organized as the Pionirski Grad in 1947 and, as the name says, were intended to be the children's recreational center. Objects in the settlement include restaurant Ozon, two bungalows which serve as the kindergarten and outdoor terrains for basketball, futsal, handball, tennis, athletics and jogging. In the concrete hall there are indoor courts for futsal and squash, the first and only in Belgrade. Major building has an area of 6,000 m^{2} (65,000 sq ft) and contains restaurant, cabinets, classrooms, disco and artistic ateliers. Within the building there is also an amphitheatre with 600 seats, which was rented for Veliki Brat, the Serbian version of the reality show Big Brother; for the talent show Operacija Trijumf; and for the I Love Serbia quiz show, the Serbian version of I Love My Country. In its heyday Pionirski Grad had an attendance of 100,000 per year but it lost its recreational function when the refugees from the Yugoslav Wars were settled in seven pavilions from the 1990s to 2010s. The complex was partially renovated in the early 2010s: street lights were repaired, green areas rearranged and memorial plaques placed. A process of step-by-step reconstruction began in 2014. By 2017 the hall and the sports terrains have been renovated, the house of "Big Brother" was demolished and all objects have been vacated awaiting the reconstruction in 2018. Number of children visiting the premises during the year grew to 12,000 in 2016.

The works however didn't start, though the settlement's "return to the children" was reiterated on yearly basis by the city officials. Additional attractions, like the rollercoaster, were not mentioned anymore. In February 2022, city again announced reconstruction of the main hall, adaptation of the former "Big brother" hall into the indoor swimming pool, and demolition of the bungalows as the new ones should be built.
