= Žarkovo =

Žarkovo Жарково
- Urban neighbourhood
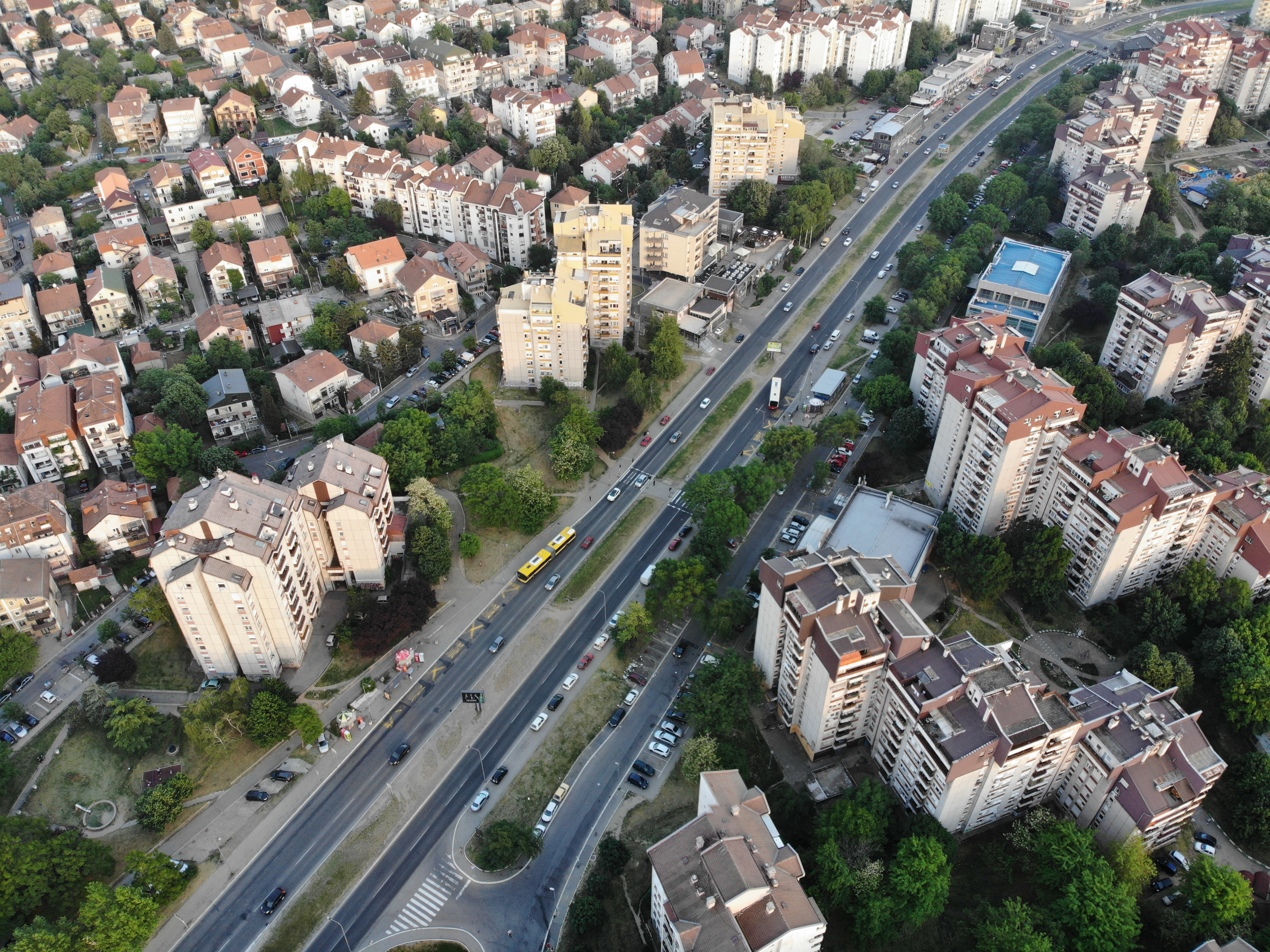
- Trgovačka street, commercial center of Žarkovo

- Location within Belgrade
- Coordinates: 44°45′N 20°25′E
- Country: Serbia
- Region: Belgrade
- Municipality: Čukarica

Area
  - Total: 10.35 km^{2} (4.00 sq mi)

Population (2011)
  - Total: 30.979
  - Density: 2.993/km^{2} (7.752/sq mi)
- Time zone: UTC+1 (CET)
  - Summer (DST): UTC+2 (CEST)
- Area code: +381(0)11
- Car plates: BG

Žarkovo (Serbian Cyrillic: Жарково, pronounced [ʒǎːrkɔ̝v̞ɔ̝]) is an urban neighborhood of Belgrade, Serbia. It is located in Belgrade's municipality of Čukarica.

== Location and divisions ==
Žarkovo (Greater Žarkovo) is one of the most populous single neighborhoods of Belgrade. As such, it is divided in several sub-neighborhoods, which were built as Žarkovo's extensions: Julino Brdo and Repište to the north, Cerak-Cerak II to the west and Bele Vode and Rupčine to the south.

In general, Greater Žarkovo is bordered by the Čukarica, Banovo Brdo to the north, Košutnjak to the east, Skojevsko Naselje to the northeast and Makiš to the west. On the south, it is bordered by the open fields of Stari Lanci, Novi Lanci and Rupčine, but with the urbanized strip of land alongside the Belgrade-Bar railway and the Vodovodska Street it makes a continuous built-up area with Železnik to the southwest.

== Etymology ==
The village was named Belo Vrelo (White Water Spring). It was mentioned for the first time under its present name in 1523, in Ottoman defter. Žarkovo got its name after primićur Žarko. Primićur was a title, Slavic version of the German word kramar, chief of the military guard which escorted trade caravans.

However, according to the local Žarkovo's folk legend, parts of the village were named after the events surrounding the gigantic evil dragon who harassed the villagers in the area around the water spring above the village. Living in the cave next to the spring, dragon was abducting the most beautiful girls who would come to get water from the water source. In the end, the dragon was killed by the brave young man named Žarko. The humongous animal slammed into the ground creating a valley. Where his head fell, the Zmajevac Hill was formed (Serbian zmaj, dragon), where was his tail is modern Repište (rep, tail), Repište Creek (also known as Kraljeva cesma or King`s Creek) began to flow where his body slammed from the tail which Žarko cut off, while Žarkovo itself was named after the hero who killed the dragon. Urbanized area around the stream is also called Zmajevac and is today one of the sub-neighborhoods of Žarkovo.

Another theory is that the name came from the word žar (ember). For centuries, the nearby Sava river was the frontier between various states and large empires, so the settlements along the river were often attacked and burned. For example, town of Obrenovac, southwest from Žarkovo, was previously called Palež (burned ground, arson).

== Geography ==
There are several streams in the neighborhood, like the Zmajevac, but Žarkovo developed in the valley of the Paripovac stream. The Paripovac is also the longest stream in the area. Its spring is between modern streets of Jablanička and Arčibalda Rajsa, on the southwest slopes of the Košutnjak. It flew to the northwest parallel to the streets of Ratka Mitrovića and Ace Joksimovića, and then turning to the west, flowing into one of the numerous water canals in Makiš. In this final section, the stream cut one of the deepest river valleys in Belgrade area.

The stream is today mostly conducted underground, into the sewage system. The deep, carved valley remained to this day, and one of the streets around it is called Provalijska (Chasm). Crossed by the Žarkovo Bridge, it is the only remaining point where the stream is still visible today. However, an informal settlement developed at the bottom of the valley, under the bridge, polluting the stream and covering it with garbage.

== History ==
The remains of the large Neolithic settlement from the period of the Vinča culture, known as the Ledine locality, was found in the area Bele vode. With the localities Vinča-Belo Brdo and Usek, it is one of the longest existing Vinčan settlement that has been discovered so far.

Žarkovo became important border trade settlement after the border between Austria and the Ottoman Empire stabilized on the Sava river. Serbian merchants were selling entire herds of pigs and oxen via Žarkovo and the Ostružnica ferry on the Sava's bank. But, also because of its location, most of the military attacks on Belgrade originated from Žarkovo's direction, after forcing a river crossing. This included the Austrian attacks of 1717 by Prince Eugene of Savoy, and 1789 by Ernst Gideon von Laudon. Austrian map of Belgrade area from 1721 shows Žarkovo as having 42 houses, located where Žarkovo's center is today. The village had three "walled" water wells and cemetery with a chapel, situated on the same location as today. This makes Žarkovo cemetery the oldest surviving cemetery on the territory of modern Belgrade.

Prior to the First Serbian Uprising, Žarkovo was the central location for supplying rebels with weapons. After the uprising started in 1804, it was an unofficial military base of Karađorđe and Serbian rebel army. Belgrade's Ottoman pasha, Bekir Pasha, met with Karađorđe in Žarkovo, reached an agreement regarding the Ottoman outlaws, Dahije, and asked Karađorđe not to attack Belgrade, but to make headquarter outside of the city, in Vračar. He agreed, let the Ottomans through the gauntlet (with Serbian soldiers firing in the air) organized at modern Bele Vode section of Žarkovo and moved the army. He attacked and liberated Belgrade in 1806.

After the Second Serbian Uprising in 1815, Žarkovo continued to prosper. Surroundings were fertile. Uphill in the Košutnjak direction was fertile arable land while the terrain above Repište was known for grapevines. IN the Železnik direction there were thick forests while Makiš contained meadows suitable for livestock. It was recorded that natural conditions for breeding pigs were so good, that the farmers didn't even have to feed them. In 1840 the school was opened, with 19 boys and 1 girl pupil.

Žarkovo was granted self-administration in 1839, and on 2 July 1856 the municipality was formed. According to the records of the day, the municipality was bordered by the right bank of the Sava river, left bank of the Topčiderka river, and by the territories of the Kneževac, Železnik and Ostružnica villages. Žarkovo municipality was more important than the village of Čukarica, which split from it as a separate municipality on 21 December 1911 by the ukaz of King Peter I of Serbia, and territorially cut off Žarkovo from both rivers.

Beginning of the 20th century was the "golden age" of Žarkovo. Prior to World War I, it was considered one of the wealthiest municipalities in Serbia and occupied much larger territory than what is considered Žarkovo today. The administration had so many assets at its disposal to rent, that no municipal taxes were introduced on the population. During the war, German field marshal August von Mackensen's plan to attack Belgrade, again included Žarkovo as one of the focal points in the first days of the attack. After the war, and creation of the united South Slav state, Žarkovo lost its lucrative border trading post importance.

Žarkovo was still considered to be a wealthy village, known for its dairy. In 1936, Žarkovo produced 14,000 litres of milk daily for the Belgrade markets. The surrounding area was known for fertile land and with the large market of the nearby Belgrade for the farmers' products, farmers and craftsmen families in Žarkovo turned affluent. The village had a cinema, culture center, municipal and administrative building, etc. Municipality of Žarkovo was abolished in July 1955 and it was annexed to the municipality of Čukarica. A direct line of the Belgrade public transportation, No. 31, connected Žarkovo to downtown Belgrade, at the Republic Square.

== Population ==
In 1821, 53 houses were recorded in Žarkovo, with 71 tax payers (married men) and 154 men from 7 to 70 years old in total. In 1870 it had 105 houses and 580 inhabitants.

Until the 1970s, Žarkovo was a suburb of Belgrade, a separate, extremely fast growing town (population 1961: 8,636; 1971: 28,761), so it was administratively annexed to the Belgrade City proper, becoming local community within the city, and an extensive development of the border neighborhoods in the 1970s and 1980s (Banovo Brdo, Sunčana Padina, Cerak Vinogradi, Skojevsko Naselje), connected Žarkovo and the rest of Belgrade into one continuous built-up area. In 1981 local community of Žarkovo had a population of 43,721, which was already 40% of the population in the urban section of the Čukarica municipality. Later, the local community was divided into several smaller ones, but the population of Žarkovo in widest sense was 71,773 in 2002. Čukarica municipality recreated local community of Žarkovo, which included Julino Brdo and Bele Vode but without Cerak. Žarkovo had a population of 30,979 in 2011 (with Cerak, 74,972).

== Characteristics ==
The Old School building was constructed in 1840 as both the school and the seat of the village administration. In 1880 the administration moved out, and the school, later named "Ljuba Nenadović", continued until 1968 when it was moved into another building. The old building was declared a cultural monument in 1965, but was left to the elements since the pupils moved out. By the 2010s, it was totally neglected and desolate. The school was built from solid materials, with a simple design of a modest, standardized architectural "box" style. It had two classrooms and several smaller auxiliary rooms, including the teacher's quarters. The ground-floor object has a cellar beneath a part of the roof, which is four-gabled and covered with flat tiles. The house was declared a cultural monument. In 2020 it was decided to adapt it into the Museum of Žarkovo and Čukarica. Reconstruction began later that year 2020. Under the name оф Heritage Museum of Žarkovo, as a department of the Belgrade City Museum, it was opened on 17 May 2022.

The old, large two-storey building, which was the administrative seat of the municipality, was built in 1921. At the plateau next to the building, there was a monument dedicated to the fallen heroes in World War II, but was later moved next to the "Ljuba Nenadović" elementary school. After it lost its administrative purpose in 1955, it hosted pharmacy, bakery and finally a library. It wasn't maintained well and became crumbly. The building was demolished in 1986, during the complete overhaul of the Trgovačka Street, central street in the neighborhood. Big, glass-plated shopping mall was built instead, and as the commercial facilities spread around it, it is today the busiest part of Žarkovo and a major crossroad of numerous public transportation and intercity bus lines. The locality is today known as the Žarkovo Center. A shopping mall, built in the area in the 1990s, has been nicknamed Titanic, and then officially named Shopping Mall Titanic (TC Titanik), due to its pointy shape, which resembles ship's bow.

A major communal problem is an informal Romany settlement under the Žarkovo Bridge, in the valley of the Paripovac stream. The settlers mostly collect garbage for further sale or recycling. In time, they created a landfill around the settlement, clogging the remaining above-the-ground flow of the stream with waste. The municipality cleaned the landfill and the stream several times, but to no avail.

With only 12 m (39 ft), Žarkovo's Lovačka street is officially the shortest street in Belgrade.

== Sub-neighborhoods ==
=== Žarkovo Selo ===
Bele vode is the oldest part of Žarkovo. Urbanized today, with its small houses with backyards and short streets, it still distinct itself from the rest of the modern, tall buildings in the neighborhood. It had a population of 4,219 in 1981 (9,6% of the whole population of Žarkovo) and 7,625 in 2002 (10,6%).

== Economy ==
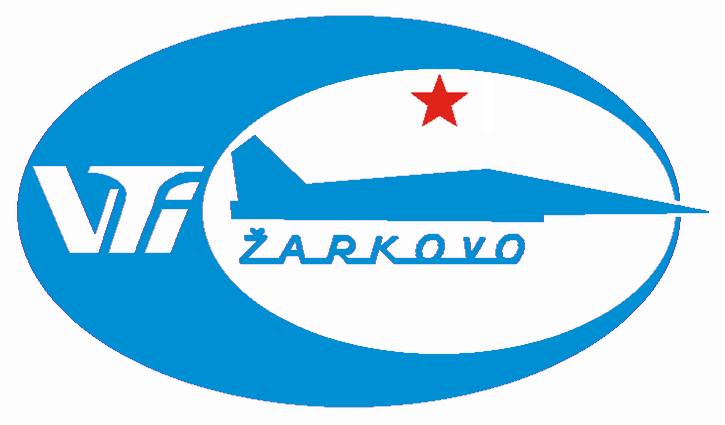
Logo of the Aeronautical Technical Institute (VTI Žarkovo), from its latter days, circa 1990

Žarkovo is mostly residential area. Western part of the neighborhood, alongside the Milorada Jovanovića Street is industrialized though, so as the area on the Makiš-Bele Vode border (freight train station and a marshalling yard on the Belgrade-Bar railway, the largest one in Belgrade, and the central facilities (including the water factory) of the Belgrade waterworks). Military Technical Institute Belgrade (former Aeronautical Technical Institute) is located in the Žarkovo's extensions Bele Vode.

The main street in Žarkovo, the Trgovačka Street is developing into a new commercial center, as an extension of the major commercial center and the main street of Banovo Brdo, the Požeška Street. Trgovačka Street itself extends into the major road in western Serbia, the Ibar Highway.

== See also ==
- KK Žarkovo
- Military Archive, Belgrade

== Sources ==
- Mala Prosvetina Enciklopedija, Third edition (1985); Prosveta; ISBN 86-07-00001-2
- Jovan Đ. Marković (1990): Enciklopedijski geografski leksikon Jugoslavije; Svjetlost-Sarajevo; ISBN 86-01-02651-6
