= Cerak =

Cerak Церак
- Urban neighbourhood
- Location within Belgrade
- Coordinates: 44°44′N 20°25′E
- Country: Serbia
- Region: Belgrade
- Municipality: Čukarica
- Time zone: UTC+1 (CET)
  - Summer (DST): UTC+2 (CEST)
- Area code: +381(0)11
- Car plates: BG

Cerak is an urban neighborhood of Belgrade, the capital of Serbia. It is located in Belgrade's municipality of Čukarica.

== Characteristics ==
The name of the neighborhood, Cerak, in Serbian means Turkey oak forest. Main traffic street is Jablanicka street, from which many smaller, residential streets and cul-de-sacs radiate. One of the borders of Cerak is the Ibar transite. The Neighborhood is of a mixed residential type, with both single-family houses (mostly row- or semi-detached houses), multi-family low-rises (ground+2 floors) and a few higher residential buildings (g+5/6 floors). The latest construction next to the southern edge (lining Ibarska magistrala) are all apartment blocks.

Cerak, like Cerak Vinogradi, is extensively planted with trees and decorative shrubbery, which, combined with relatively low traffic density makes it a very livable area. Being the oldest neighborhood of the "Cerak" area (Cerak, Cerak Vinogradi, Cerak 2), Cerak hosts the area's post office, one of the two kindergartens, several supermarkets and grocery stores. It has one elementary school.

The neighborhood is served by a bus line of Belgrade public transport (52) and is a short drive from Banovo Brdo, Ada Ciganlija and Kosutnjak. There is also the 534 line, which connects Cerak and Ripanj. Some of the bus lines that link to places near Cerak are: 23, 37, 50, 51, 52, 53, 56, 57, 59, 89, 531, 532, 533 and 534. All of these buses have stops that are in or near Cerak so it isn't difficult to reach.

== Population ==
Total population of the neighborhood was 43,210 in 2002 (local communities of Cerak 12,591, Vinogradi 13,091 and Sportski Centar 17,528). By the census of 2011 all three local communities were united in one named Cerak with a population of 43,993.

== Sub-neighborhoods ==
=== Stari Cerak ===
The western section of the neighborhood (Bitoljska, Mojkovačka, Petefijeva, Partizanske Vode streets, etc.) is referred to as Stari Cerak (Old Cerak). It consists of several hundred residential houses.

=== Cerak II ===
Neighborhood southeast of Cerak had been officially named Cerak II in 1985-1987. However this neighborhood, consisting of the urban area around the Vinogradski Venac and Cerski Venac streets, is a natural and architectural western extension of Cerak Vinogradi. Just like the rest of Cerak Vinogradi it is a residential area, bounded by Jablanička street (and Cerak) to the north, Ibarska magistrala freeway to the west and Vidikovac neighborhood in the municipality of Rakovica to the south.

The neighborhood is part of the Cerak Vinogradi protected area. The plans were drafted from 1980 to 1983, and the construction lasted from 1983 to 1987. It covers an area of 35 hectares (86 acres) and includes 25 residential buildings with 1,150 apartments.
