= Dedinje =

Neighbourhood in Belgrade, Serbia

Dedinje Дедиње
- Urban neighbourhood
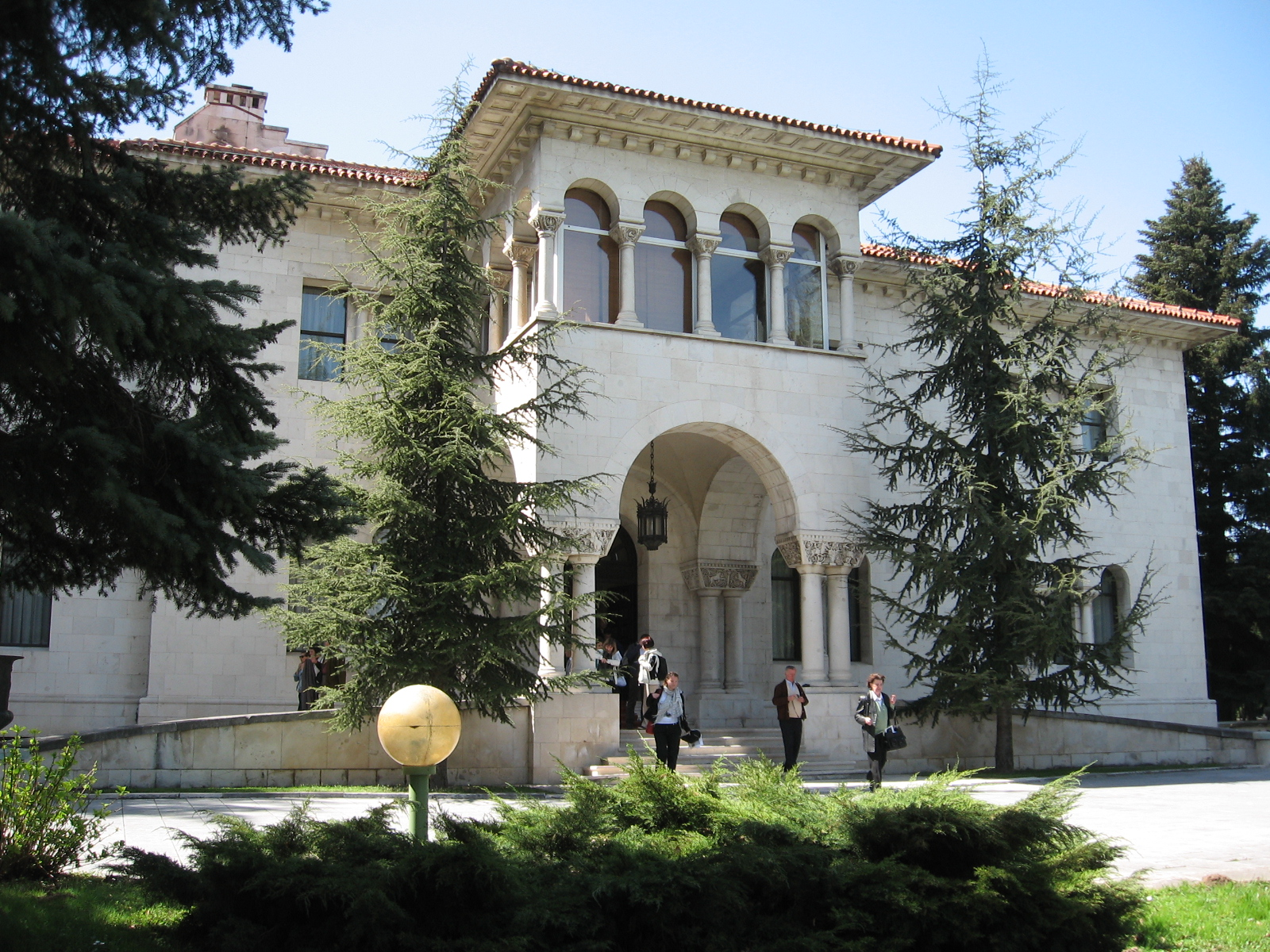
- Kraljevski Dvor at Dedinje Royal Compound

- Location within Belgrade
- Coordinates: 44°46′14″N 20°27′24″E
- Country: Serbia
- Region: Belgrade
- Municipality: Savski Venac
- Time zone: UTC+1 (CET)
  - Summer (DST): UTC+2 (CEST)
- Area code: +381(0)11
- Car plates: BG

Dedinje (Serbian Cyrillic: Дедиње, pronounced [dɛ̌diːɲɛ]) is an urban neighborhood of Belgrade, the capital of Serbia. It is located in Belgrade's municipality of Savski Venac. Dedinje is generally considered the wealthiest part of Belgrade, and is the site of numerous villas and mansions owned by the members of the city's plutocracy, as well as many diplomatic residences.

== Location ==
Dedinje is located on the eastern slopes of the hill of Topčidersko Brdo, 7-8 kilometers south of downtown Belgrade to which it is connected by the Kneza Miloša street. It borders the neighborhoods of Senjak (west), Prokop and Mostar (north), Stadion and Diplomatska Kolonija (actually, Dedinje's sub-neighborhood; east), Banjica, Lisičji Potok and Topčider (south). It is well connected to the other parts of Belgrade by several boulevards (of Prince Aleksandar Karađorđević, Vojvoda Putnik) and broad streets (Teodora Drajzera, Neznanog junaka, etc.). Main street in the neighborhood itself is the Užička street.

The hilly section on which the Dedinje Royal Compound is built is called Vezirovo Brdo ("Vizier's Hill").

== History ==
In the Ottoman period, the hill was a gathering place of the dervishes. In Turkish census from 1560, one of the Belgrade's tekija, administered by the dervishes who vowed to poverty, was located there. Before it was urbanized, the area was known for its vineyards, orchards (owned by the dervishes) and farms. The area was mentioned by the names Dedija, Mala Dedija, Dedina, Dedino brdo (literally, old man's hill; Serbian deda means old man, elder, grandfather). Origin of the name may be the fact that the superiors of the dervishes were called dedo (elder). The name spread and was accepted so when the Austrian army had a camp on Dedinje in 1789, in their charts from the 18th century they called the neighborhood Dedinberg.

King Aleksandar Obrenović and queen Draga built an estate in the early 20th century on top of the hill. They've chosen the spot due to its position of a natural lookout: from there you could see nicely the forest in Košutnjak, valley of Rakovica, Kneževac and the blue Avala, whole of Belgrade, Zemun and the dark blue foothills of Fruška Gora. Settlement began to grow after the World War I, intensifying with the building of the residencies of the Karađorđević royal family, from 1924 to 1936. Majority of residents were from the most affluent Belgrade families of industrialists, bankers, merchants and politicians, who built summer-houses at first and later lavish villas. What is today considered as the best known parts of Dedinje, like Tolstojeva or Užička streets, were not originally part of the settlement, as it emerged more to the south.

It was estimated that by 1936, there were 8,000 structures, including barracks, houses, mansions and villas. Among the non-royal residents were the journalistic Ribnikar family, which founded the daily Politika and publisher Geca Kon (modern 33 Tolstojeva Street). Being on the outskirts of the city, there were numerous military barracks intended to defend the city, but the city later spawned tens of kilometres further.

Many beautiful mansions in green neighborhood have been built, but in 1945 when Communists took over, they declared almost all former residents a state enemies and forced them out of their houses, so the new Communist political and military elite moved in, Josip Broz Tito being among the first, followed by Aleksandar Ranković, Milovan Đilas, Edvard Kardelj and Moša Pijade, among others. Similar process continued after the collapse of Communism in the 1990s, when the nouveau riche politicians (like Slobodan Milošević), shady businessmen (like the Karić family or Željko Mitrović) and criminals (like Željko Ražnatović Arkan) moved into the neighborhood and began expanding their villas and erecting high concrete walls. Most of such construction was illegal, often intruding on the property of Dedinje families that had been there for generations preceding the arrival of the nouveau riche/criminal class.

Milošević especially expanded his complex. After purchasing villa at 33 Tolstojeva, he expanded to the numbers 31 and 34 in the same street and another building in the Užička Street, with the property adjoining the Residence at 15 Užička Street, which was Tito's official residence. He purchased the 33 Tolstojeva villa for only DM2,000 (€1,000), mansion in the Užička for DM9,000 (€4,500) while the renovation and adaptation of all objects was paid by the state. As Milošević's wife, Mirjana Marković, was heading the Yugoslav Left party, shortened to JUL, Dedinje was at the time jokingly called Julino Brdo, though the real Julino Brdo is a distant, separate neighborhood of Belgrade.

In 2019, Branislav Mitrović, architect and member of the Serbian Academy of Sciences and Arts, said that "caricatural architecture, inept compilations and stylish nonsenses" turned once respectable residential neighborhood of Dedinje, so as Senjak and Neimar, into chaos. The ironic twist was also pointed out - once settlement of the beggar monks who vowed to poverty, Dedinje was transformed into the neighborhood of the greedy and rich. His colleague Branislav Stojkov in 2022 commented that since the 2010s investors were allowed to build whatever they want, wherever they want, if they have political backup. He gave an example of the massive "castle" built by the media magnate Željko Mitrović in the heart of the most distinguished part of Dedinje, the Užička Street: "financially powerful, heavily backed by politicians, and culturally deformed investor, builds a mansion of extreme distasteful kitsch architecture, with a string of urbanistic deceits".

The Mitrović's lot is part of the preliminary protected spatial unit of Senjak-Topčidersko Brdo-Dedinje. It means it has to be treated as protected, until the protection is confirmed or denied, and that opinion of the city's Institute for the protection of cultural monuments regarding the project is obligatory, but the institute was never notified about the construction. City allowed construction of 2,047 m^{2} (22,030 sq ft) in total, above and below the ground, but the structure has a total of 6,000 m^{2} (65,000 sq ft) of which 2,047 m^{2} (22,030 sq ft) is above the ground. The massive structure is called by Mitrović, who calls himself Žeks, the Temple of Saint Žeks.

The neighborhood is also a site of many embassies, diplomatic residences and some of Belgrade's most expensive restaurants and clubs. In 2013, it was announced that the villa “Crnogorka”, in Užička Street, was to be returned to Princess Elizabeth of Yugoslavia. The villa was bought by her mother, Princess Olga, in 1940, and taken by the state in 1947. It is currently owned by the Serbian government and used as the official residence of the Ambassador of Montenegro. After it was returned to Princess Elizabeth and her brother Prince Alexander, they immediately sold the entire lot to the British investment fund represented in Serbia by the Princes Park company. Plans, announced in 2018 and 2023, include demolition of "Crnogorka" and construction of 12 luxurious smaller villas in the 1.4 ha (3.5 acres) lot bounded by the Užička, Krajiška and Kačanička streets.

== Administration ==
From June 1945 to December 1946, Dedinje was one of 5 administrative neighborhoods within Belgrade's Raion VII.

Dedinje belonged to the municipality of Topčidersko Brdo, which in 1957 merged with the municipality of Zapadni Vračar to create the municipality of Savski Venac. Dedinje (local communities of Dedinje and 4. Juli) had a population of 8,704 in 2002 and 8,440 in 2011.

== Notable locations ==
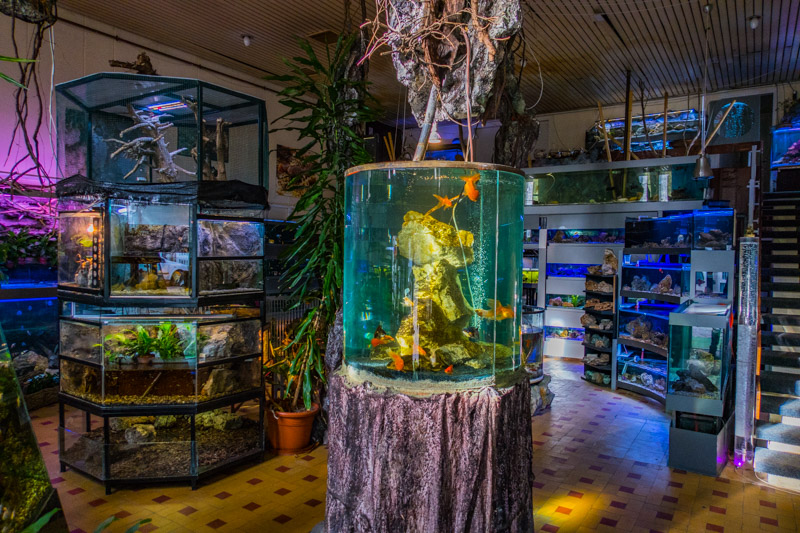
Javak aquarium

=== Residences and Diplomatic missions ===
- The Dedinje Royal Compound - location of the Kraljevski Dvor and Beli Dvor, former royal residences.
- Presidential official residences at 2 Konavljanska and Tolstojeva 2a
- Prime-ministerial official residence at 75 Kneza Aleksandra Boulevard
- Ambassador's official residences of the United States and the United Kingdom
- The embassies of the United States, China, Korea, Indonesia, Pakistan, the United Arab Emirates, Israel, Palestine, Syria, Lebanon, and Cyprus.

=== Culture and science ===
- The Museum of Yugoslavia
- The House of Flowers, the mausoleum of the late Yugoslav President Josip Broz Tito.
- "Javak - Public Aquarium and Tropicarium" in the Milenka Vesnića street. Adaptation of the facility began in 2014 and it was opened in April 2016 on the location of the former sports hall. It contains aquariums and terrariums with recreated biotopes from all over the world: temperate and tropical waters, forests, rainforests, deserts and cold seas. Part of the exhibition is coordinated with the curriculum of the elementary schools so the Javak can function as the location for the students' practical studies, both from the school and the Faculty of the Veterinarian medicine. There is one large aquarium, 600 m (2,000 ft) long which contains 2,500 L (550 imp gal; 660 US gal) of water. Smaller aquariums are differently shaped - pyramidal, cylindrical, dodecahedron. Javak contains 300 different species. Adriatic aquarium contains crabs, crayfish, octopus, moray eel, sea anemones, sea urchins and starfishes. Tropical and coral aquariums contain fauna from the Hawaiian Islands, Red Sea, Lake Malawi, Lake Tanganyika, Pacific and Indian Ocean. Aquarium for the local fauna include species from the rivers Sava and Danube, and from Sava Lake. Freshwater aquariums are inhabited with the piranhas, Oscar fish, discus fish and arowana. Other maritime organisms include the clownfish, pangasius, common carp, goldfishes, angelfish and sponges. In the Reptil corner, terrariums contain, among others, corn snake, tarantulas, scorpions, geckos, chameleons, agamas, iguanas, gerrhosaurus, red-eared sliders. Additionally, several stray dogs and cats live in the complex. There is also a cinema theatre which shows educational films. Green area around the building is embellished with the bonsai trees as the nucleus of the projected outdoor artificial pond for the koi fishes, which are now kept inside. The only public aquarium in Belgrade, by April 2020 the facility hosted some 3,000 individual animals, including the 10 kg (22 lb) large giant gourami. Over 25,000 pupils and students visited the aquarium since it was opened, in organized, educational tours. The facility cooperates with the University of Belgrade's faculties of Biology and Veterinary Medicine, and the Institute for the Natural Protection, including participation in publishing scientific books. The aquarium made news again in 2020 during the coronavirus outbreak, when due to the measures for fighting the pandemic it lost visitors and income, as the costs of specific maintenance and feeding of many exotic species remained high.
- Villa Šterić, at 4 Generala Šturma Street. Built in 1933 by the architect Milan Zloković for Dragoljub Šterić, aircraft designer and owner of Zmaj Aircraft. As representative specimen of the interwar, late modernistic style, with the purpose and form blended together and within the surroundings, it was described as one of the most emblematic structures of Serbian Interbellum architecture. The original villa's maquette is kept in the Belgrade's Museum of Science and Technology, and was exhibited in 2011 in the Vienna's exhibition titled Architecture of Belgrade. In 2019 it was declared a cultural monument. Still, despite the protection, in 2022, the full renovation and change of both the exterior and the interior began without proper permits. Though the Institute for the Protection of the Cultural Monuments and some inspections reacted, asking for the investor to restore the villa to its previous appearance, the city declined to intervene.
- Art palace "Madlena", endowment of Madlena Zepter, opened on 19 September 2022. Exhibition gallery which includes permanent furniture and antiquity exhibition, chamber music and theatre scene, and movie theater.

=== Military ===
- The headquarters of the Serbian General Staff.
- The headquarters of the Guard of the Serbian Armed Forces.
- Military Academy.
- The vast secret military complex of Karaš, built between 1965 and 1980, with numerous barracks and kilometers of underground passages. Brought to the public's attention in the 2004 unsolved murders of two on-duty soldiers.

=== Health ===
- A hospital complex which includes the hospitals of Železnička bolnica and one of the major Belgrade's hospitals, University Hospital Center Dr Dragiša Mišović, whose neonatal nursery ward was notoriously bombed by NATO in 1999, even with the ongoing deliveries.
- Dedinje Cardio Surgery Hospital

=== Parks ===
- Hyde Park, occupying the northern, triangular section of the neighborhood, named after Hyde Park in London.
- Park Humska, at the corner of the Humska and the Kneza Aleksandra Karađorđevića Boulevard, with 2.4 hectares (5.9 acres).
- Mini park at Dragiša Mišović children's hospital, covering 81.18 ares (87,380 sq ft).
- Park Ljutica Bogdan, mini park along the street of the same name, across the Dragiša Mišović hospital. It covers 46.45 ares (50,000 sq ft).
- Rosalie Morton Park, in the vicinity of the University Hospital Center Dr Dragiša Mišović.
- Playground with a Zip line build by Bakery "Hleb i Kifle", in front of the Dragiša Mišović hospital, and corner with the Kneza Aleksandra Karađorđevića Boulevard.

=== Plantlife ===
- several old or rare non-native trees protected by the state.
  - the cedar tree in the Tolstojeva street, believed to be planted personally by the major Serbian botanist, Josif Pančić, in 1880.
  - the tulip tree, between the Pukovnika Bacića and Maglajska streets, native to China and North America, with tulip-like flowers.
  - yellow-flowered sophora tree, native to China and Korea.

=== Sports ===
- Amateur football club FK Dedinje BGD that plays in Međuopštinska liga "А". Club was formed on February 13, 2014.

=== Entertainment ===
- Headquarters of RTV Pink.
