= Topčidersko Brdo =

Topčidersko Brdo Топчидерско Брдо
- Urban neighbourhood
- Location within Belgrade
- Coordinates: 44.792328°N 20.438669°E
- Country: Serbia
- Region: Belgrade
- Municipality: Savski Venac
- Time zone: UTC+1 (CET)
  - Summer (DST): UTC+2 (CEST)
- Area code: +381(0)11
- Car plates: BG

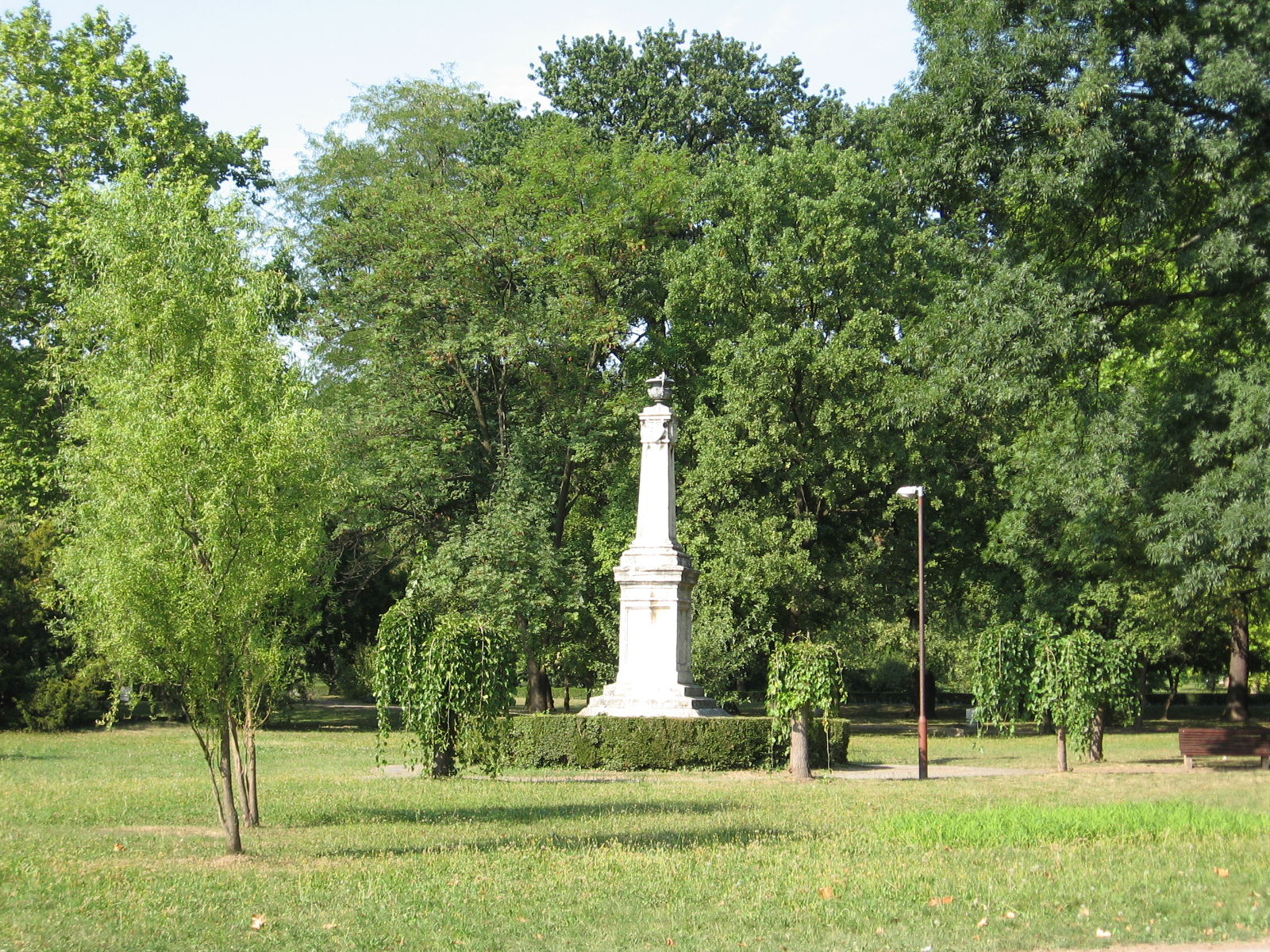
Park Topčider

Topčidersko Brdo (Serbian Cyrillic: Топчидерско Брдо; pronounced [tǒp.tʃi.der.skoː br̩̂.do]) is an urban neighborhood and former municipality of Belgrade, the capital of Serbia. It is located in Belgrade's municipality of Savski Venac.

== Location ==
Topčidersko Brdo (from Turkish and Persian, topčider meaning "cannonier's valley") is located 4 km (2.5 mi) south-east of downtown Belgrade to which it is directly connected through the Kneza Miloša street. The central street of Topčidersko Brdo is the Boulevard of Vojvoda Putnik with a roundabout of Topčiderska Zvezda ("Topčider star"). On the western slope of the hill, which sharply ends above the Sava river, the neighborhood of Senjak is located, while east of the Boulevard of Vojvoda Putnik is the neighborhood of Dedinje. Northern slope, in the valley of the former creek of Mokroluški potok (now conducted underground) was occupied by the former neighborhood of Jatagan Mala which was demolished to make way for the new interchange on a highway, Mostarska Petlja and a new railway station of Prokop. Hyde Park, named after the famous Hyde Park in London, is also on the northern slope of the hill. To the south, the neighborhood extends into the valley of the Topčiderka and the park of Topčider itself.

== History ==
Topčidersko Brdo was an unurbanized, distant city's periphery, separate from the rest of the city by the gully. The area was rich in grapevines, pine and black locust groves. The hill was on the route of the Topčider Road, which connected downtown Belgrade to the forests of Košutnjak and Topčider. The road section on the northern slope, between Senjak and western part of Točidersko Brdo, is today named Bulevar Vojvode Putnika. This section of the street was embellished with the quadruple chestnut avenue in the late 19th century.

In what will become the eastern section of the neighborhood (today also considered western section of Dedinje), urbanization began in the late 19th century. Members of the affluent families began to build villas along the Kragujevac Road, modern Bulevar Oslobođenja, trying to avoid the busy life in downtown. Construction gained momentum after World War I, and in the 1920s, splendid mansions with arranged gardens were built by the bankers, rich merchants, higher clerks and rentiers.

The hill is today mostly a wooded area. This is the result of the 1923 Belgrade's general plan. One of the main projects regarding the green areas was forestation of the hill, formation of the new park and establishment of the continuous green area with the Topčider Park. Project started in 1926 while the Hyde Park was finished in the 1930s. Today, the continuous Topčider-Košutnjak parks and forests make the largest "green massif" in the immediate vicinity of Belgrade's urban tissue.

== Characteristics ==
Total forest area of Topčidersko Brdo covers 21.22 ha (52.4 acres).

From 1933 to 1936, a building of the elementary school "Branko Radičević" was built in the neighborhood, "among orchards and vineyards". In 1972, the school was relocated to the Blokovi neighborhood in New Belgrade.

In 1939, Church of Saint Archangel Gabriel was built in the Humska Street. It was built in the Serbo-Byzantine style, to commemorate Serbian soldiers died in World War I. Being within the complex of the modern Military Gymnasium, the Serbian Orthodox Church declared it a City of Belgrade's military church.

The Topčiderska Zvezda water reservoir is located in the neighborhood. It hosts about 5% of Belgrade waterworks storage space. The facility was built in 2008–2010 but became operational only in March 2019.

In August 2021 it was announced that city's Institute for the Cultural Monuments' Protection is conducting a study on declaring the Topčidersko Brdo-Dedinje area a protected spatial cultural-historical unit.

== Municipality ==
The municipality of Topčidersko Brdo was formed after the previous division of Belgrade into districts (rejon, 1945–52) abolished. It comprised the two wealthiest neighborhoods of Belgrade, Senjak and Dedinje. Following the new administrative reorganization, Topčidersko Brdo merged with the municipality of Zapadni Vračar to create new, still existing municipality of Savski Venac. After the abolition of the municipality, Topčidersko Brdo remains mostly a geographical rather than administrative term even though it makes one local community within Belgrade with Senjak (Topčidersko Brdo-Senjak) with a population of 7,249 in 2002.

== Sources ==
- Mala Prosvetina Enciklopedija, First edition (1960), Vol. II; Prosveta;
- Bulletin No 40/2002: Census of population by the local communities - preliminary results; City of Belgrade's Statistical office;
- Beograd - plan grada; M@gic M@p, 2006; ISBN 86-83501-53-1
