= Senjak =

Senjak Сењак
- Urban neighbourhood
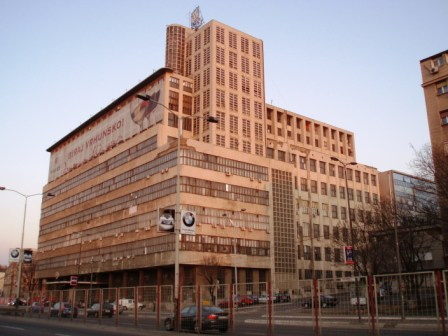
- BIGZ building

- Location within Belgrade
- Coordinates: 44°47′34″N 20°26′19″E
- Country: Serbia
- Region: Belgrade
- Municipality: Savski Venac

Area
  - Total: 3.18 km^{2} (1.23 sq mi)
- Time zone: UTC+1 (CET)
  - Summer (DST): UTC+2 (CEST)
- Area code: +381(0)11
- Car plates: BG

Senjak (Serbian Cyrillic: Сењак, pronounced [sêɲaːk]) is an urban neighborhood of Belgrade, the capital city of Serbia. Located in Savski Venac, one of the three municipalities that constitute the very center of the city, it is an affluent neighborhood containing embassies, diplomatic residences, and mansions. Senjak is generally considered one of the wealthiest parts of Belgrade.

== History and etymology ==
Before it became interesting to Belgrade's upper classes, Senjak was an excellent natural lookout. As many farmers kept their hay throughout the entire city, fires were quite frequent, so it was ordered for hay to be collected and kept in one place, and the area of modern Senjak was chosen, apparently also getting its name in the process (from the word seno, Serbian for hay). Especially bad was the fire in the late September 1857, when almost all stacks of hay stored in the Belgrade Fortress burned. Also, the hay for army horses was kept here in the late 19th century. A more romantic theory of the neighborhood's name (from the word sena, Serbian for 'shade' or 'shadow') developed later.

On the east, Senjak was bounded by the Topčider Road, which connected downtown Belgrade to the forests of Košutnjak and Topčider. The road section on the northern slope, between Senjak and western part of Točidersko Brdo, is today named Bulevar Vojvode Putnika. This section of the street was embellished with the quadruple chestnut avenue in the late 19th century. Southern section, which swerved around Senjak, was embellished with the avenue of poplars. Senjak and the neighboring Topčidersko Brdo are today quite wooded for the urban areas. This is the result of the 1923 Belgrade's general plan. One of the main projects regarding the green areas was forestation of the hill, formation of the new park and establishment of the continuous green area with the Topčider Park. Project started in 1926 while the Hyde Park was finished in the 1930s. Today, the continuous Topčider-Košutnjak parks and forests make the largest "green massif" in the immediate vicinity of Belgrade's urban tissue.

The settlement began to form around the tobacco factory, which was built before World War I. Several hundred of houses and hovels were built around the factory, mostly by the factory workers. Soon, workers from the neighboring industrial facilities along the Topčider Road, including the State Postage Stamp Printing Office (Markarnica), railway workers, etc. The workers settlement developed mostly along the road to the old quarry. At the time, the hill was known for the greenery and abundant fruit production, mainly apricots, grapes and figs. Lower classes had various advantages living in Senjak at the time: their workplaces were close when the public transportation grid wasn't that much developed, the costs of living outside of the city were lower, they could grow their food and fruits, there was a direct tram line to downtown and the railway also passed through the settlement.

The tobacco factory was destroyed by the Austro-Hungarian bombing of Belgrade in 1914 and wasn't rebuilt after the war. This left room for numerous workers houses to be demolished, too, and they were massively being sold due to the increased prices of the land. Instead, many villas were built by the most affluent Belgrade families. Senjak became one of the neighborhoods of Belgrade with most striking difference between social classes. Top of the Senjak Hill was occupied by the most lavish private houses in the city, while the edges and areas below the hill were among the most desolate parts of Belgrade (Prokop, Jatagan Mala).

During the 1999 NATO bombing of Serbia, a number of buildings in the neighborhood such as the Swiss ambassador's residence were damaged or affected by the conflict.

The first tram link established in Belgrade was from the Kalemegdan fortress to Senjak.

== Geography ==
Senjak is located 3 km south-west of downtown Belgrade, on top of the hilly cliff-like crest of the western slopes of Topčidersko Brdo, overlooking Belgrade Fair right below and the Sava river (from which, at the closest point, Senjak is only 100 meters away). It borders the neighborhoods of Topčider and Careva Ćuprija (south), Mostar (north), Prokop and Dedinje (east). The triangularly shaped neighborhood has many smaller streets but it is bounded by two wide boulevards, named after Serbian army vojvodas from World War I: Vojvoda Mišić and Vojvoda Putnik.

== Administration ==
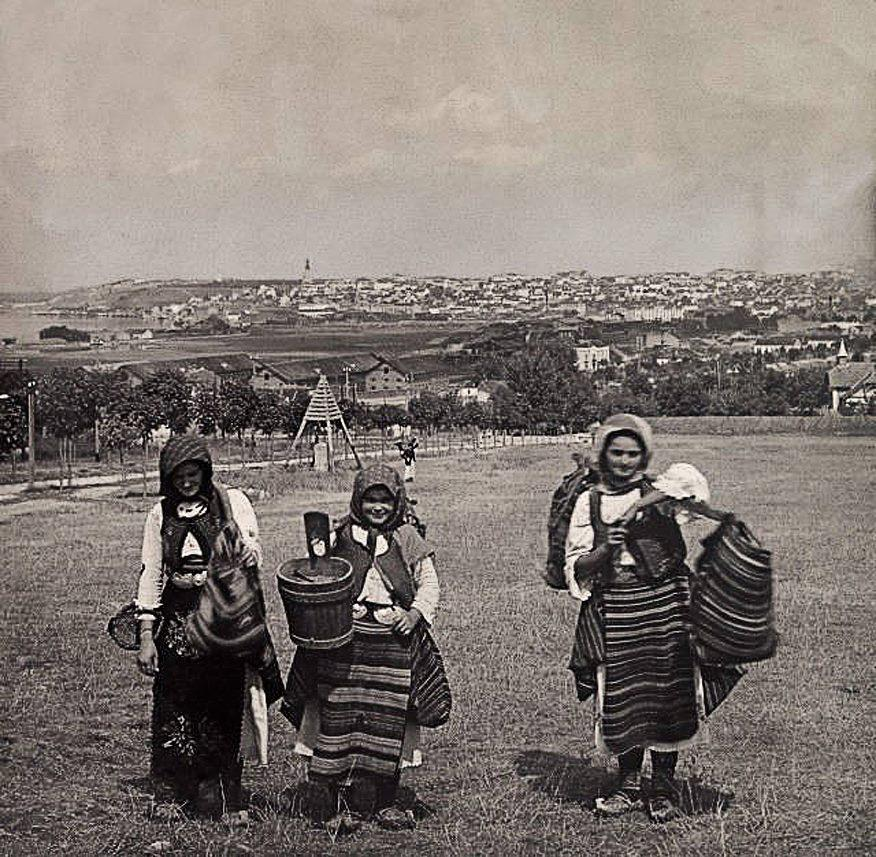
Senjak in c.1914

From June 1945 to December 1946, Senjak was one of 5 administrative neighborhoods within Belgrade's Raion VII.

Senjak originally belonged to the former municipality of Topčidersko Brdo, which in 1957 merged with the municipality of Zapadni Vračar to create the municipality of Savski Venac. Senjak existed as the local community within Savski Venac with the population of 3,690 in 1981. It was later merged into the new local community of Topčidersko Brdo-Senjak which had a population of 7,757 in 1991, 7,249 in 2002 and 6,344 in 2011.

== Characteristics ==
Just like the neighboring Dedinje, Senjak is generally considered among Belgraders as one of the richest neighborhoods in the city. After 1945, it shared much of the same fate as Dedinje: when Communists took over, they declared almost all former residents as state enemies and forced them out of their mansions, so the new Communist political and military elite moved in. Some measures in removing the former high class were brutal as only those who fled the country stayed alive. Those unlucky were taken into a nearby woods and shot, with their remains lying in unmarked graves for decades until they were exposed by construction workers clearing trees for a new football field.

Bulevar vojvode Mišića, encircles Senjak from the north, west and south and separates it from the Belgrade Fair, Careva Ćuprija and Topčider. As of 2017, it was the street with the busiest traffic in Belgrade: 8,000 vehicles per hour in one direction during the morning rush hour.

In 2019, Branislav Mitrović, architect and member of the Serbian Academy of Sciences and Arts, said that "caricatural architecture, inept compilations and stylish nonsense" turned once respectable residential neighborhood of Senjak, so as Neimar and Dedinje, into chaos.

In January 2021, city administration announced Topčiderska Zvezda as the most likely location of the future monument dedicated to the heroes from the 1916 Battle of Mojkovac. Within the scopes of World War I, it was fought between the invading Austro-Hungarian forces, and the Montenegrin army which defended the retreating Serbian army which headed for the Albanian Golgotha.

In August 2021 it was announced that city's Institute for the Cultural Monuments' Protection is conducting a study on declaring Senjak a protected spatial cultural-historical unit.

Park Military High School in the south-central area of the neighborhood covers 3.4 hectares (8.4 acres).

== Features ==
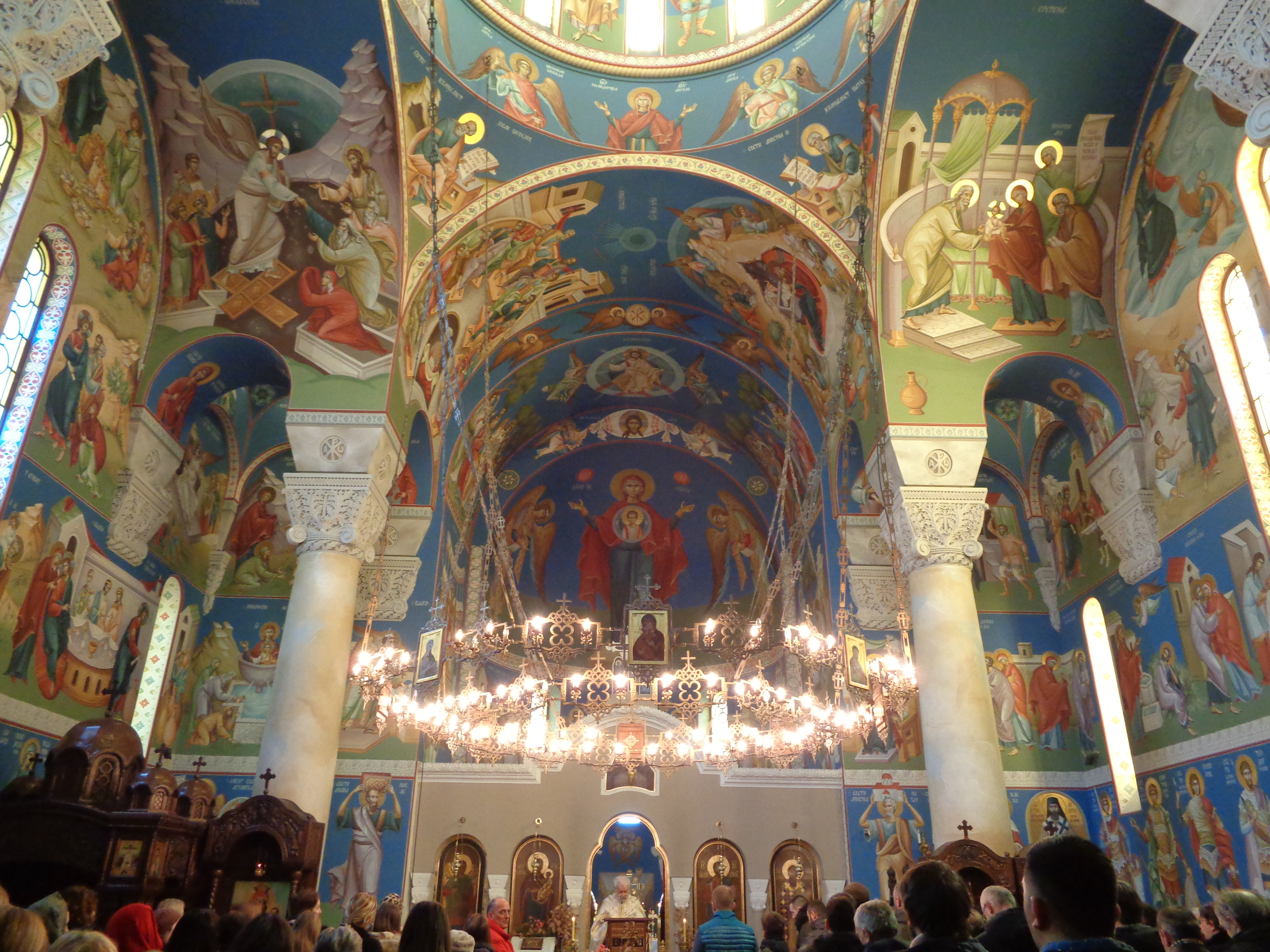
Interior of the Senjak monastery

=== Buildings ===
King Peter's House

A vacant summer house of King Peter I Karađorđević. The house stands across the football pitch of "Grafičar" and close to the building of the military academy. The house, called the "White villa", was built in 1896 and it belonged to the merchant Živko Pavlović. In 1919 the state, represented by the Ministry of education, leased the house for the king who lived there from 1919 to his death in 1921. Monthly rent was 3,000 dinars in silver. The king lived quite modestly. His own room was equipped with bed, small cabinet with the sink, locker, lamp, sable and chandelier. The king had his own library, with the books printed by the Srpska književna zadruga. He spent much time on the vast terrace and in the garden. After king's death in August 1921, the Royal Intendancy bought the house out in order to make it a museum. In the 1930s it was declared a king's memorial-house.

After 1945 residents changed and mostly included the high-ranking members of the new Communist elite and in that period majority of the exhibited artifacts, the legacy of the king, were either destroyed od taken away. Missing items include the king's death mask and the only remaining artifact was the king's bed. In 1945 the house was adapted into the elementary school which was closed in 1951 and the house, for the most part since then, remained abandoned and left to the elements. In 2010 the house was adapted into the cultural center. Within the house, a memorial room for the king was set, which includes a mosaic of 100 photographs of the king and his family.

In the house's yard, there are two trees, protected by the law since 1998. One is a 20 meters high gingko and the other is a 10 meters high magnolia tree. As of 2017, both trees are estimated at being 110 years old.

Faculty of Fine Arts complex

Bordered by the streets of Mila Milunovića, Župana Časlava and Vojvoda Putnik's Boulevard, the complex is part of the University of Arts in Belgrade's Faculty of Fine Arts. It includes three buildings, one of which is the former atelier, built in 1947, of painter Milo Milunović who died in 1967. The atelier hosts the painting section of the faculty. Other building hosts the graphics section, while the third is administrative building. Modernist, one-floor new building which would connect the existing, separate structures, which, in turn, will be expanded, was announced in September 2022. The green areas will be transformed into the park, which would also serve as an open air gallery.

Other buildings

- Military Academy; after World War I, military academy was constructed by orders of King Peter I. The academy's building is majestic, with heavy cream-colored walls and tall windows. During World War II the occupational German forces made it the headquarters for their military operations in the Balkans. The Allies bombed the neighborhood during the war in order to destroy the headquarters and the bridge over the Sava, but they didn't manage to hit it or cause any damage to the building or the bridge.
- Museum of African Art; it was established from the private collection of a Yugoslav diplomat, and contains many rare pieces.
- Museum of Toma Rosandić; located in the house, where the sculptor lived and worked until his death, was built by himself in 1929, and now holds a unique collection that is, unfortunately, not open to public, except on certain days (such as The Museum Night).
- Ecole Française de Belgrade, an international French school founded in 1951. The school is composed of a nursery school, an elementary school, a middle school and a high school.
- Senjak Gymnastics Club, which was a starting point for the future career of the renowned Yugoslav rhythmic gymnast Milena Reljin.
- The Archives of Yugoslavia and stadium and restaurant "FK Grafičar", both in the vicinity of Topčiderska zvezda, small roundabout with streets spreading in all directions connecting Senjak, Dedinje, downtown Belgrade, Topčider and further to the south (Kanarevo Brdo, Rakovica, etc.).
- BIGZ building
- Faculty of Economics, Finance and Administration (member of Singidunum University)
- International School of Belgrade
- Old Mill, a cultural monument since 1987, in 2014 adapted into the Radisson Blu Old Mill Hotel.
- Senjak Greenmarket (Senjačka pijaca) was located along the Sava river and was originally built for the workers of the Cardboard factory of Milan Vapa, which was right across it. The factory complex included the apartments for workers. Market is still operational, albeit smaller, along the Koste Glavinića Street.

=== Nature ===
- Two state protected trees of the Himalayan white pine, native to Afghanistan and Himalaya. They were planted in 1929, in the yard of the family of the scientist Milutin Milanković, in the Žanke Stokić street.
- Protected natural monument "Dedinje Beech", a European beech tree, noted for its unusually big size in urban habitats: 22 meters tall, 2,8 meter trunk diameter, 19 meters crown diameter. As of 2017 it is estimated at being 90 years old.
- Nameless park surrounding the "Stefan Nemanja" elementary school has been named "Branko Parać Relja" in February 2019. The school itself was named "Branko Parać Relja" from 1959 to 1993, when its original name was restored.
- Two sections of Senjak are classified as forests: Grafičar Forest (3.89 ha (9.6 acres)) and Rajsova Padina.

== Sub-neighborhoods ==
=== Đurđevo Brdo ===
The slope above the modern Belgrade Fair complex was known as the Đurđevo Brdo. Before World War II it was known as one of the suburban slums, with bad communal infrastructure. The neighborhood developed in the first decade after World War I, after 1919, in the area outside of the jurisdiction of the city construction rules. It was a workers' settlement, mainly inhabited by the workers on the railroad who either rented rooms or built their own shanty houses. By the 1921 general urban city plan, it was labeled as one of the "scarce settlements", which formed a suburban ring around Belgrade. A Society for Arrangement of Đurđevo Brdo and Topčidersko Brdo was founded by 1923. In the mid-1930s it had some 150 houses and a population of 600, still being classified as the shanty town with small buildings and houses with yards. The name disappeared from the city maps after World War II, when all separately developed neighborhoods grew urbanely into one called Senjak.

=== Gospodarska Mehana ===
Gospodarska Mehana (Serbian: Господарска Механа) is the westernmost section of Senjak. It occupies the slopes descending to the Sava, just across the southern end of the Belgrade Fair and north of the Topčiderka's mouth into the Sava. It was named after the famed, and one of the longest surviving kafana in Belgrade, Gospodarska mehana. Kafana was founded in 1820 in what was at the time the end of the city. Due to the construction of the Ada Bridge, access roads to it and a loop interchange, the kafana was cut off and had to be closed in September 2013, after 193 years.

In 1821, the state government decided to put the food trade in order and to establish the quantity and quality of the goods imported to the city. Part of the project was introduction of the excise on the goods (in Serbian called trošarina) and setting of a series of excise check points on the roads leading to the city. One of those check points, which all gradually also became known as trošarina, was located here as in the 1830s and 1840s it was a location of the ferry which transported pigs across the Sava into the Austria. This trošarina also functioned as a customs house. On 25 January 1859, when prince Miloš Obrenović and his son Mihailo Obrenović returned to Serbia, they landed at Gospodarska Mehana. The customs house was dismantled first. Later, the large storehouse was demolished, too, while the kafana survived until the early 21st century.

It was the final stop of the first Belgrade's tram line and still is on the important traffic route with important streets (Boulevard of Vojvoda Mišić, Radnička Street), railway, public transportation lines (still surviving tram line), road elevation which connects Banovo Brdo and Čukarica with Belgrade (formerly known as the "Gospodarska Mehana elevation"), etc. In the 1930s, when most of Belgrade's upper class built houses in Dedinje, some decided to build houses in Gospodarska Mehana, including then Prime minister of Yugoslavia, Milan Stojadinović.

=== Rajsova Padina ===
Slope right above the Gospodarska Mehana is called Rajsova padina (Reiss’ Slope), named after Archibald Reiss, Swiss forensics pioneer who lived in Senjak after moving to Serbia when the World War I ended. In May 2011, as part of the project of foresting the city and creating a green barrier against traffic from the interchange and the roads, 400 trees were planted on Rajsova padina, including cedar, pedunculate oak, Cypress oak and Siberian elm. Total forested area covers an area of 3.46 ha (8.5 acres).

=== Smutekovac ===
In the mid-19th century, northern part of modern Senjak was a meadow, with only the Topčider road passing through. It was used as the training ground for the army and as the pasture for the sheep. The northern slope, above the left bank of the Mokroluški Creek was known as Zamastir. Czech émigré Heinrich Smutek, who owned a kafana, arranged a large estate (with a bricklayer), and a garden in the area. Zamastir then became known as Smutekovac, after the kafana's name. It became an excursion site for the Belgraders, which originally came by fiacres and later by the tram "Topčiderac", which connected the downtown with Topčider.

In the 1870s the area was parceled and Đorđe Vajfert purchased the land from the lawyer Pera Marković. As he was a German subject, he couldn't own properties in Serbia. Instead he paid the entire sum to Marković who issued him a receipt. Vajfert then started to build the brewery in 1872, predecessor of the modern BIP Brewery at the same location. As soon as he was granted Serbian citizenship, Vajfert received a deed on the land. He finished the brewery and turned the surrounding estate into an exquisite garden, which hosted many banquets and parties. In 1892, city authorities organized a banquet with Nikola Tesla as the guest of honor.

=== Stari Senjak ===
The neighborhood developed in the first decade after World War I, in the area outside of the jurisdiction of the city construction rules. It developed after 1919 south of Đurđevo Brdo, in the direction of the Sugar Refinery and Čukarica further to the south. In the mid-1930s it had some 50 houses and a population of 200, still being classified as the shanty town with small buildings and houses with yards.

=== Šest Topola ===
The bank of the Sava river at Gospodarska Mehana was the most popular Belgrade's beach during the Interbellum. The beach was known as the "Šest Topola" ("Six Poplars") and especially boomed after 1933 when other beaches were closed. Just like other smaller location, it was equipped with the swimming (bathing) pools with wooden floors. It had separate bathing pools for men, women and children. The first water polo matches in Belgrade were held at "Šest Topola" between World Wars. After World War II, the new Communist authorities considered such bathing places relicts of the old regime and wanted to make leisure more approachable for the lower classes, so in time they switched to forming proper beaches along the rivers instead of the bathing centers.

So, in time, the neighboring Ada Ciganlija became the top excursion site. The name of "Šest Topola" is preserved in the name of the restaurant on the Sava's bank within the complex of the Belgrade Fair. Designed by architect Milorad Pantović, it was opened on 23 August 1957. For a while after 1964, it was part of the Hospitality Educational Center.
