= Savski Venac =

Savski Venac Савски Венац (Serbian)
- Municipality
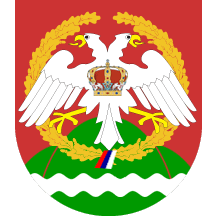
- Coat of arms

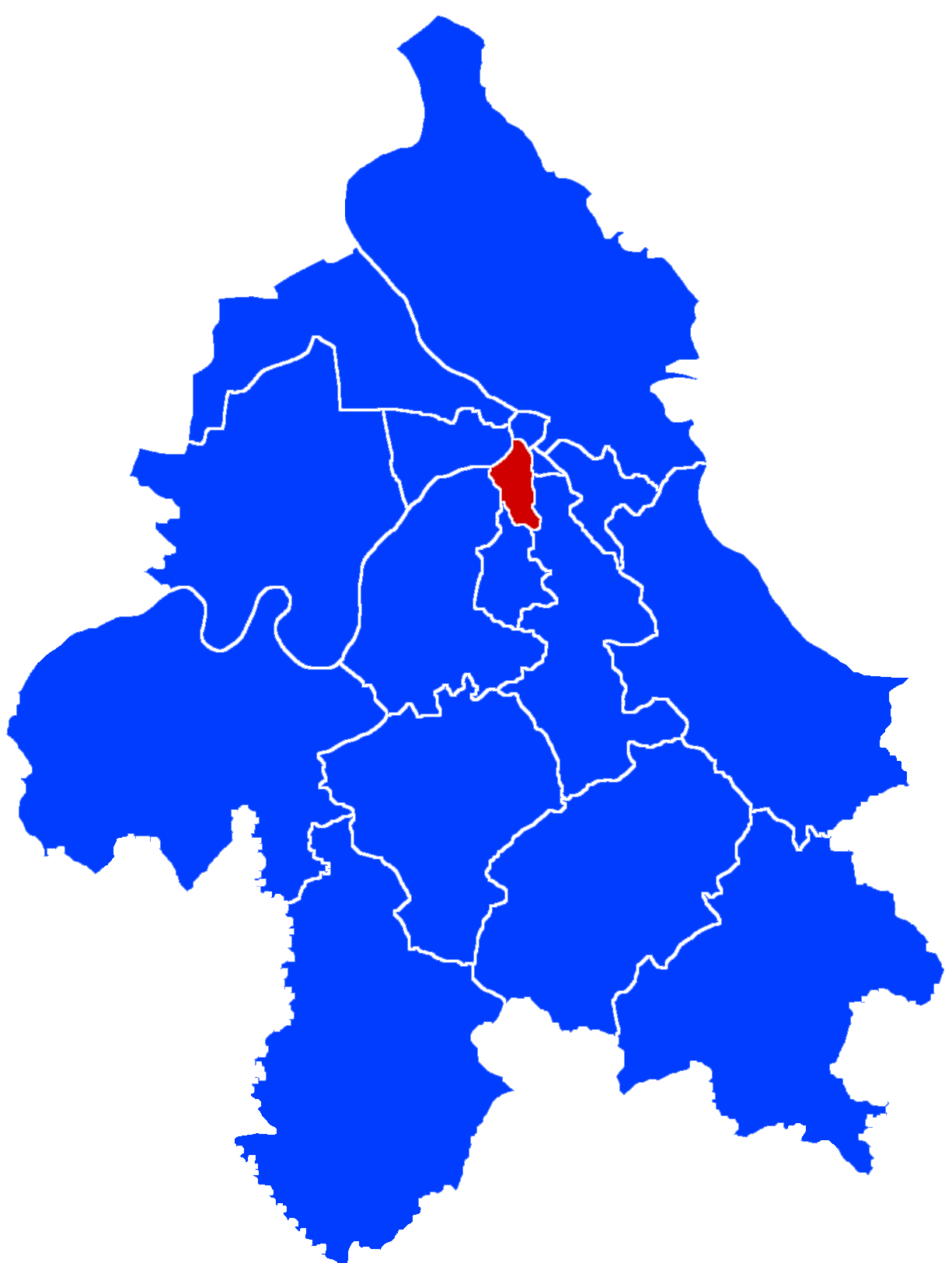
- Location of Savski Venac within the city of Belgrade
- Coordinates: 44°41′N 20°24′E
- Country: Serbia
- City: Belgrade
- Status: Municipality
- Settlements: 1

Government
  - Type: Municipality of Belgrade
  - Mun. president: Miloš Vidović (SNS)

Area
  - Total: 14.07 km^{2} (5.43 sq mi)

Population (2022)
  - Total: 36,699
  - Density: 2,608/km^{2} (6,756/sq mi)
- Time zone: UTC+1 (CET)
  - Summer (DST): UTC+2 (CEST)
- Postal code: 11000
- Area code: +381(0)11
- Car plates: BG
- Website: www.savskivenac.rs

Savski Venac (Serbian Cyrillic: Савски Венац, pronounced [sâːv̞skiː v̞ě̞ːnat͡s]) is a municipality of the city of Belgrade. According to the 2022 census results, the municipality has a population of 36,699 inhabitants.

It is one of the three municipalities which constitute the very center of Belgrade, together with Stari Grad and Vračar.

Savski Venac is located on the right bank of the Sava river. It stretches in the north-south direction for 6 kilometers (3.7 mi) (from downtown Belgrade, just 200 meters (660 ft) from Terazije, to Banjica) and east-west direction for 3 kilometers (1.9 mi) (from Senjak and the Sava bank to Autokomanda). It borders the municipalities of Stari Grad to the north, Vračar to the north-east, Voždovac to the east, Rakovica to the south and Čukarica to the west.

== History and name ==
While Savski Venac and Stari Grad are often styled the oldest municipalities of Belgrade due to their inclusion of the oldest sections of urban Belgrade outside the walls of the Kalemegdan fortress, they are actually the most recently created municipalities of Belgrade. Both were formed in 1957 by merger of older, smaller municipalities; Savski Venac was formed in by merger of the municipalities of Zapadni Vračar (its main predecessor) and Topčidersko Brdo and a new, geographical name, Savski Venac, was coined for it.

(Venac is usually used in Belgrade's geography in term of a round street (Obilićev Venac, Kosančićev Venac) or a rim of the river (Dunavski Venac). In this case it was the "rim of the Sava".)

== Geography ==
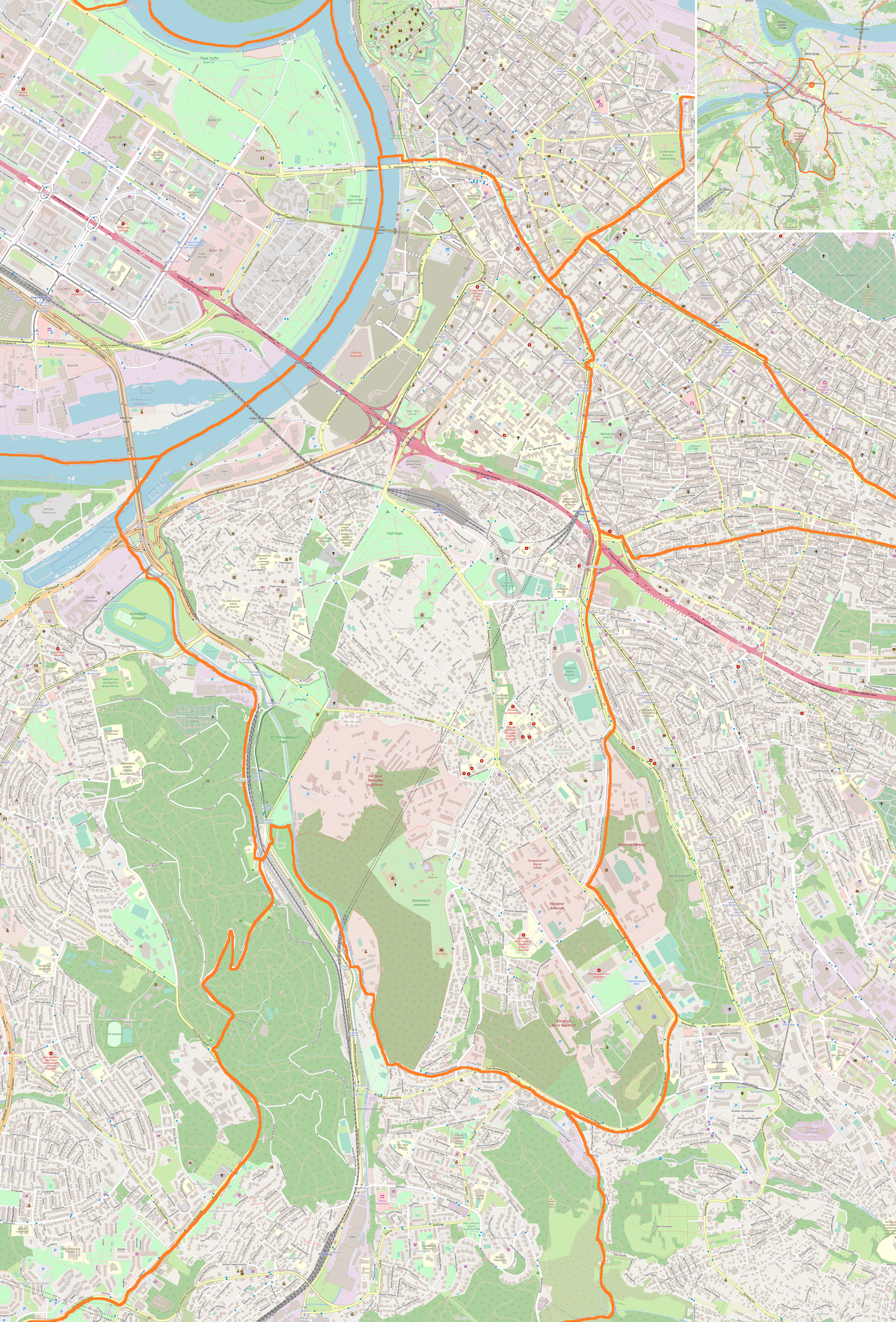

With an area of 14 square kilometers (5.4 sq mi), Savski Venac is the third smallest municipality of Belgrade after Vračar and Stari Grad. Despite being small in area, it includes several diverse geographical features:

- the low section on the right bank of the Sava river (Savamala and Bara Venecija). Due to its low altitude toward the Sava, and lack of any protection, this is the only part of central urban area of Belgrade that gets flooded during the extremely high waters of the river. It was almost completely flooded in 1984 and during major floods in 2006.
- southern slopes of the hill of Terazije (Terazijska Terasa) which descends from downtown Belgrade to the Sava.
- entire western slope of the Vračar Hill (Karađorđev Park and former Zapadni Vračar) which also descends to the Sava.
- southern slope of the Vračar Hill, known as the Guberevac Hill or Ludo Brdo ("Crazy Hill") as it is the location of the psychiatric hospital "Laza Lazarević".
- the former valley of the stream od Mokroluški Potok, now conducted underground. It is a route to the modern highway and the new railstation of Prokop.
- the hill of Topčidersko Brdo which has a cliff-like edge above the Sava (Senjak).
- the hill of Banjica in the extreme south of the municipality.
- the upper valley of Topčiderska reka and the vast park-forest of Topčider.

== Neighborhoods ==
- Bara Venecija
- Dedinje
- Diplomatska Kolonija
- Gospodarska Mehana
- Jatagan Mala
- Karađorđev park
- Lisičji Potok
- Mostarska Petlja
- Prokop
- Savamala
- Senjak
- Stadion
- Topčider
- Topčidersko Brdo
- Zapadni Vračar
- Zeleni Venac

== Demographics ==
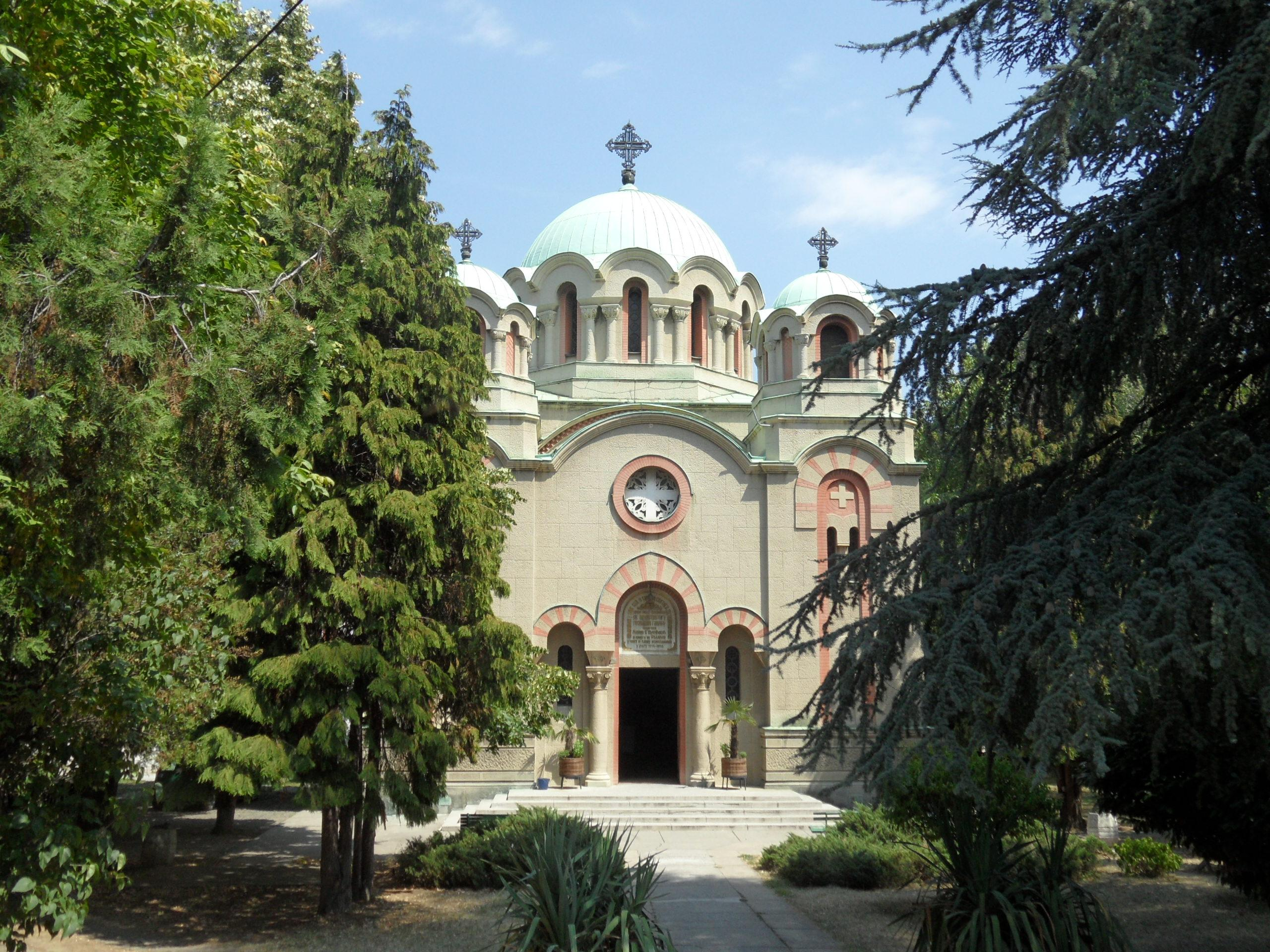
Church of St. Archangel Gabriel

Historical population
| Year | Pop. | ±% p.a. |
|---|---|---|
| 1948 | 54,067 | — |
| 1953 | 65,366 | +3.87% |
| 1961 | 74,971 | +1.73% |
| 1971 | 63,531 | −1.64% |
| 1981 | 53,374 | −1.73% |
| 1991 | 47,682 | −1.12% |
| 2002 | 42,505 | −1.04% |
| 2011 | 39,122 | −0.92% |
| 2022 | 36,699 | −0.58% |

According to the census of 2022, Savski Venac has a population of 36,699 inhabitants. As all the other central city municipalities, it has been depopulating for decades, however, it still remains one of the most densely populated: 2,445/km^{2} (6,330/sq mi) (4,686/km² or 12,136/sq mi back in 1961).

=== Ethnic structure ===
The ethnic composition of the municipality:

| Ethnic group | Population |
|---|---|
| Serbs | 27,881 |
| Yugoslavs | 466 |
| Russians | 277 |
| Montenegrins | 205 |
| Croats | 152 |
| Romani | 138 |
| Macedonians | 110 |
| Gorani | 62 |
| Bosniaks | 56 |
| Slovenians | 50 |
| Muslims | 34 |
| Hungarians | 27 |
| Romanians | 26 |
| Ukrainians | 21 |
| Slovaks | 20 |
| Germans | 17 |
| Bulgarians | 10 |
| Others | 7,207 |
| Total | 36,699 |

== Administration ==
Presidents of the municipality (since 1997):

- 1997–2000: Zdravko Krstić
- 2000–2004: Branislav Belić
- 2004–2012: Tomislav Đorđević
- 2012–2016: Dušan Dinčić
- 2016–2020: Irena Vujović
- 2020–present: Miloš Vidović

== Economy ==
The following table gives a preview of total number of registered people employed in legal entities per their core activity (as of 2018):

| Activity | Total |
|---|---|
| Agriculture, forestry and fishing | 115 |
| Mining and quarrying | 21 |
| Manufacturing | 2,139 |
| Electricity, gas, steam and air conditioning supply | 105 |
| Water supply; sewerage, waste management and remediation activities | 283 |
| Construction | 2,268 |
| Wholesale and retail trade, repair of motor vehicles and motorcycles | 4,759 |
| Transportation and storage | 4,099 |
| Accommodation and food services | 2,204 |
| Information and communication | 3,801 |
| Financial and insurance activities | 2,431 |
| Real estate activities | 262 |
| Professional, scientific and technical activities | 4,729 |
| Administrative and support service activities | 5,919 |
| Public administration and defense; compulsory social security | 43,170 |
| Education | 4,407 |
| Human health and social work activities | 19,448 |
| Arts, entertainment and recreation | 1,184 |
| Other service activities | 1,069 |
| Individual agricultural workers | 8 |
| Total | 104,424 |

== Sport ==
Sportsko Selo ("Sport Village") – In the early 1970s a football pitch was built at the end of the Deligradska street, right above the highway. It was adapted into the Yugoslav People's Army Reserve Officers' Training Ground, but in the early 1990s the location was abandoned. The lot was left unattended and gradually turned into a rubbish dump. In 2009 a project for the ground was jointly drafted by the city and the municipality with the working title "Ada Ciganlija u malom". After two years of construction, the new complex was opened on 30 May 2011. It covers an area of 85 ares (91,000 square feet) and contains one volleyball, three basketball and four tennis courts, children playgrounds and a fitness plateau. There are also a futsal and bocce courts, outdoor gym, walking paths, rest areas, wooden ice-cream kiosk and a parking lot. The complex is situated in a wooded area and includes an amphitheater suitable for the theatrical performances in the open. Invited to choose the name for the complex between the originally proposed "Ada Ciganlija u malom" and "Sportsko Selo" which appeared during the construction, citizens picked the latter.

Local football club FK BASK plays in the third-tier Serbian League Belgrade and play their home games at the Careva Ćuprija Stadium.

== Features ==
Savski Venac constitutes the western section of the downtown Belgrade. Most government offices and administrative buildings are located in the municipality, including:

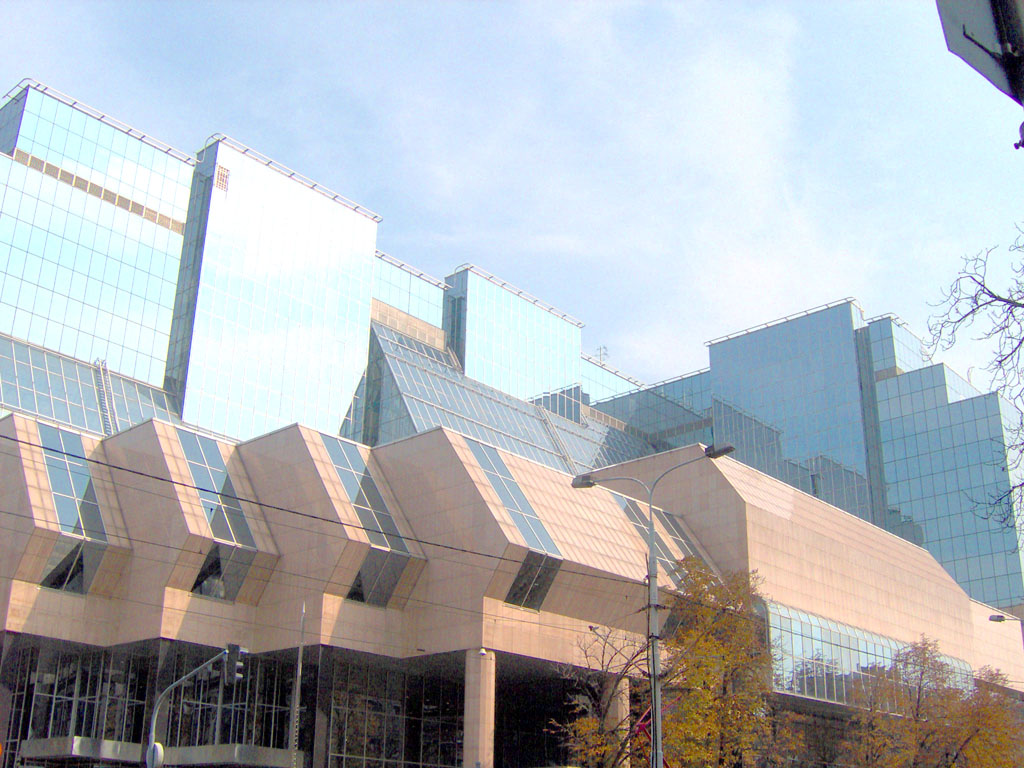
The building of the National Bank of Serbia, near Slavija Square

=== Administration ===
- Government Building in Nemanjina Street
- Ministry of Foreign Affairs Building in Kneza Miloša Street
- The Building of the Ministries, Nemanjina street
- The building of the National Bank of Serbia, (Slavija)
- Over 30 embassies and dozens of ambassadorial residences
- Archives of Yugoslavia (Senjak)

=== Traffic ===
- Belgrade Centre Railway Station
- Belgrade Main Railway Station (defunct)
- The Belgrade-Niš highway and all the six bridges across the Sava to Novi Beograd: Brankov, Stari savski, Gazela, Stari želenički, Novi železnički, Most na Adi
- Both major interchanges in old Belgrade: Mostarska Petlja and Autokomanda

=== Economy and tourism ===
- BIP Brewery
- Belgrade Fair (Beogradski sajam, on the bank of the Sava)
- Open green market "Zeleni Venac"
- Hotel "Astorija"
- Hotel "Beograd"
- Hotel Bristol
- Beli Dvor, former royal court

=== Health ===
- Clinical Centre of Serbia, with 24 clinics and hospitals (beginning at Karađorđev park); two skyscrapers, which were to become one single Clinical Centre (Policlinic), a joint location for all the existing separate clinics, were planned already in 1973. Construction began in 1976, but due to the lack of funding, the works were soon halted. They were resumed in 1983 and in 1987 the first building was finished, but only the lower floors became operational. Upper floors remained unfinished and left to the elements since. Preliminary works, which include reconstruction of the finished structure and the construction of another one began on 6 December 2018. In March 2019, the Health ministry announced that the renovation of the operational part, revitalization of the empty building and construction of the twin tower, will all be finished by 2022.
- University's Children hospital in Tiršova Street, built from 1936 to 1940. Construction of the new children's hospital, colloquially called Tiršova 2, closer to the highway, began on 20 October 2021.
- City ambulance (Mostar)
- Hospital Dragiša Mišović (Dedinje)
- Železnička hospital (Dedinje)
- Orthopaedic hospital (Banjica)
- Vojnomedicinska akademija ("VMA", Banjica)

=== Culture and education ===
- Yugoslav Drama Theatre
- Theater Bojan Stupica
- Student's Cultural Center (SKC)
- University of Belgrade Faculty of Economics
- Faculty of the veterinarian medicine of the Belgrade University
- Touristic high school (Jug Bogdanova street)
- French School (Ecole Française de Belgrade)

=== Forests and parks ===
Urban forests and parks include:

- Bencion Buli Forest (1.96 ha (4.8 acres))
- Banjica Rise Forest (3.61 ha (8.9 acres))
- Park Bristol
- Čukarica Bay Forest (3.61 ha (8.9 acres))
- Park Gavrilo Princip
- Grafičar Forest (3.89 ha (9.6 acres))
- Hajd Park (8.28 ha (20.5 acres))
- Lisičji Potok Forest (7.44 ha (18.4 acres))
- Park Luka Ćelović
- Park Manjež
- Park Milutin Milanković
- Reiss Slope Forest (3.46 ha (8.5 acres))
- Topčider Forest, with the entire complex around the Residence of Prince Miloš (16.25 ha (40.2 acres))
- Topčidersko Brdo Forest (21.22 ha (52.4 acres))

== See also ==
- Subdivisions of Belgrade
- List of Belgrade neighborhoods and suburbs
