= Topčider =

Topčider Топчидер
- Urban neighbourhood
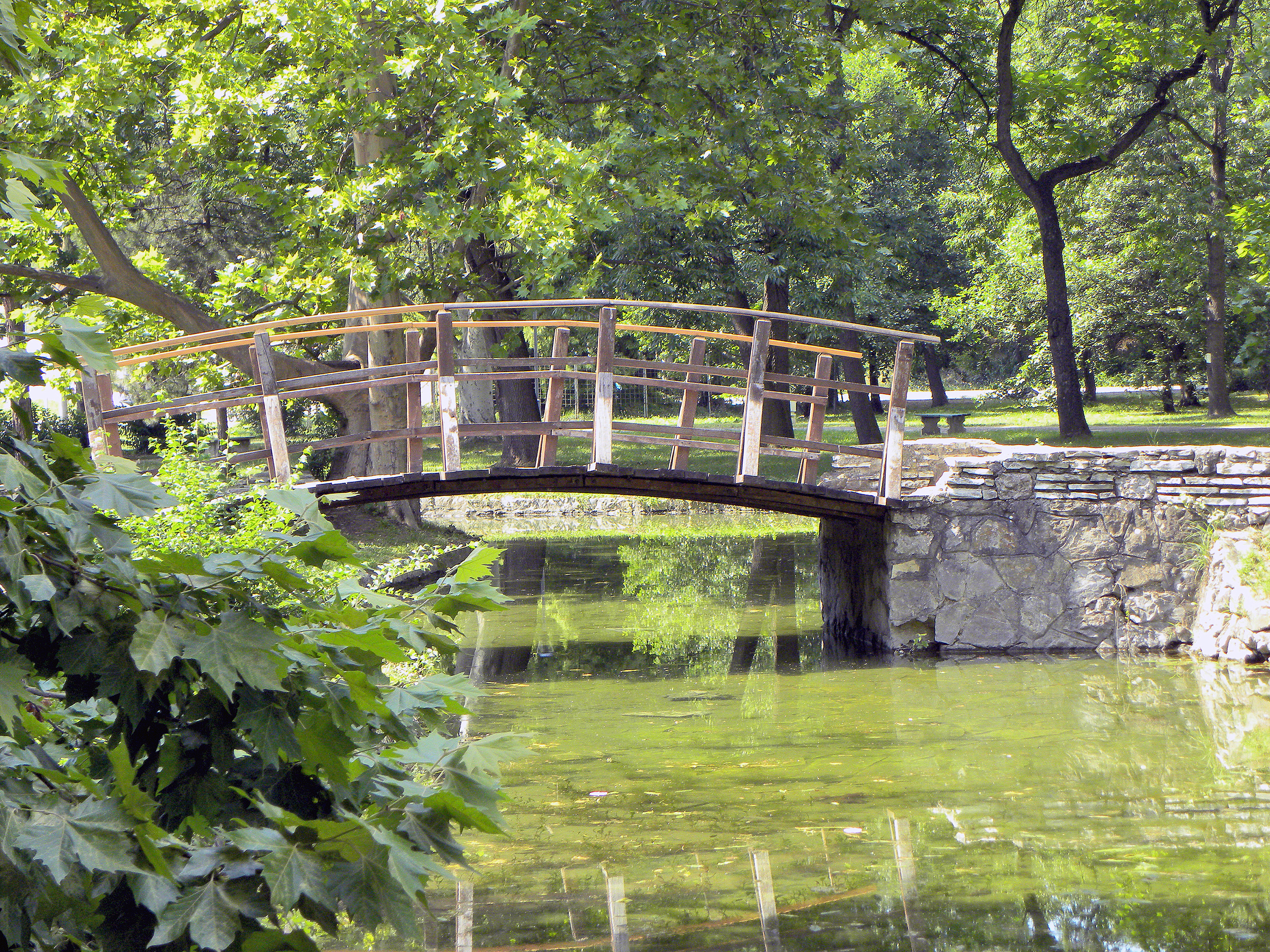

- Location within Belgrade
- Coordinates: 44°46′07″N 20°26′50″E
- Country: Serbia
- Region: Belgrade
- Municipality: Savski Venac
- Time zone: UTC+1 (CET)
  - Summer (DST): UTC+2 (CEST)
- Area code: +381(0)11
- Car plates: BG

Topčider (Serbian Cyrillic: Топчидер; pronounced [tɔ̝̌pt͡ʃide̞r]) is a forest park and an urban neighborhood of Belgrade, the capital of Serbia. It is divided between the municipalities of Čukarica, Rakovica and Savski Venac. Being close to downtown, it is one of the major locations for relaxation, picnics and fresh air for the citizens of Belgrade.

As a result of the 1923 Belgrade's general plan, where one of the main projects regarding the green areas was forestation of the area between Topčider and the city, a continuous green area Senjak-Topčidersko Brdo-Hajd Park-Topčider-Košutnjak was formed by the 1930s. This continuous forested area makes the largest "green massif" in the immediate vicinity of Belgrade's urban tissue.

Nobelist author Ivo Andrić wrote: "You just hang on to Topčider and Košutnjak...Topčider is my favorite place, where I ate bread and drank wine in the sweetest and calmest manner".

== Location ==
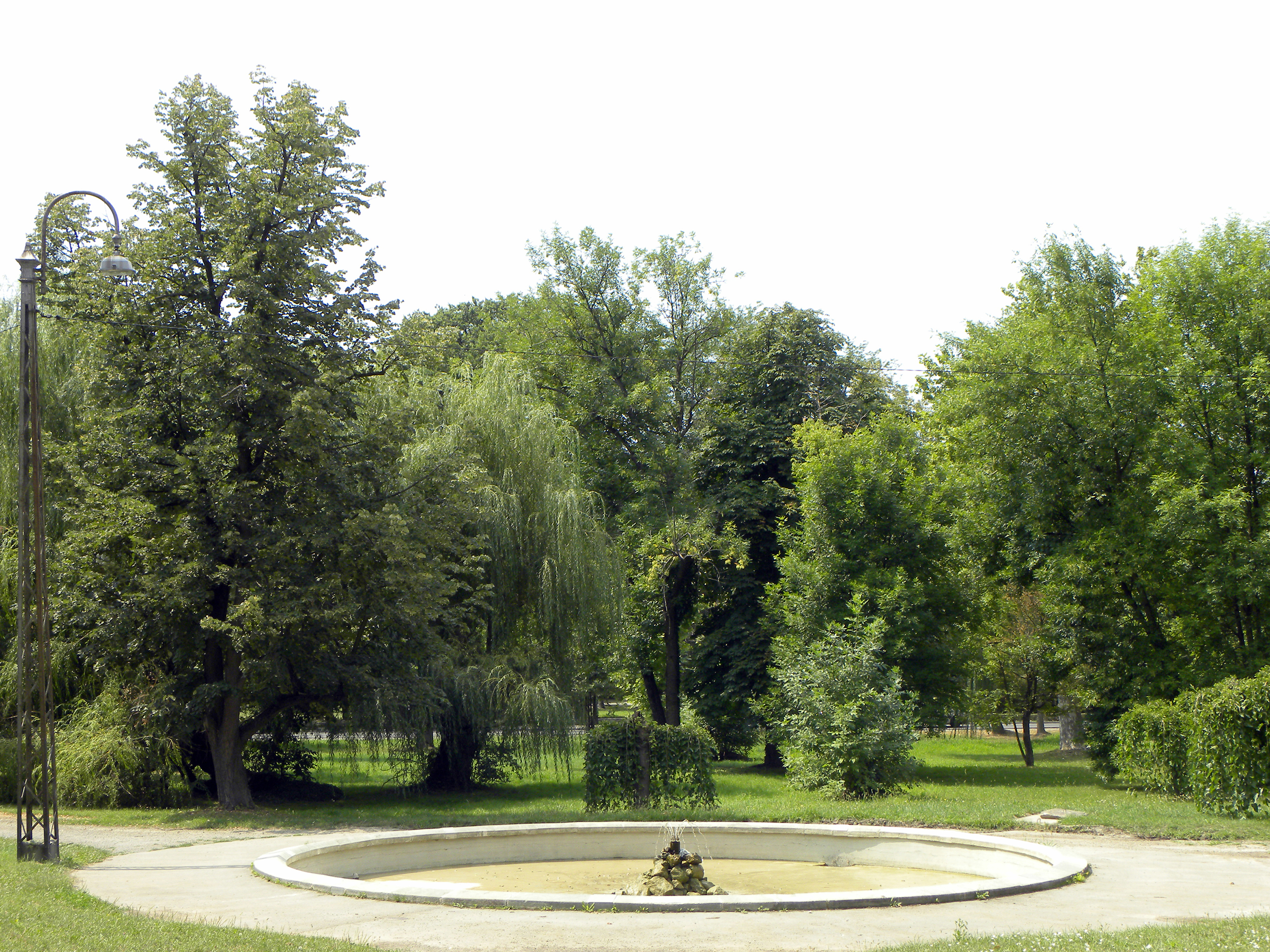

Geographically, Topčider covers a much larger area than what people generally refer to as Topčider today. The eastern slopes of Topčidersko Brdo ("Topčider Hill") begin already at the Mostarska Petlja and the highway. The neighborhood of Senjak is located on the western, and Dedinje on the right side. This is where the street of Topčiderski Venac and the roundabout of Topčiderska zvezda ("Topčider star") are located. The southern slopes of the hill extends into the valley of the Topčiderska reka, a tributary to the Sava river, which has been channeled in this section. This is the area identified with the term Topčider. Topčider Park begins five kilometers south of downtown Belgrade and extends west, east and south into the old Topčider woods which itself extend west into the park-wood of Košutnjak.

In the upper parts, Košutnjak and Topčider forests grow together, while in the lower parts they are divided by the Topčiderska reka and a railway passing through the river valley (both Košutnjak and Topčider have their own, separate train stations). In the extreme north-west Topčider extends into the neighborhood of Careva Ćuprija and in the south-east into Lisičji Potok. It also borders the neighborhood of Kanarevo Brdo in this section.

== History ==
=== Pre-19th century ===
Topčider is mentioned for the first time in the 17th century travelogue of the Ottoman explorer and traveler Evliya Çelebi. In Ottoman records, the village of Muminovac was also mentioned in the Topčider valley. During the Austrian occupation of northern Serbia in 1717-1739, the name Topčijino Selo (gunner's village) was also recorded.

During Ottoman times, the valley of Topčiderska reka and the Topčider wood were locations where the Turkish artillery was positioned, intended to defend Belgrade, being distant from the town itself at the time (thus many military barracks to defend the city from later periods, but the town later sprawled tens of kilometers further). This is how the area got its name as in Turkish it means "artillery men's valley" (top, cannon; topçu, artillery man; dere, valley), though it is usually erroneously thought to mean simply the cannon valley.

=== 19th century ===
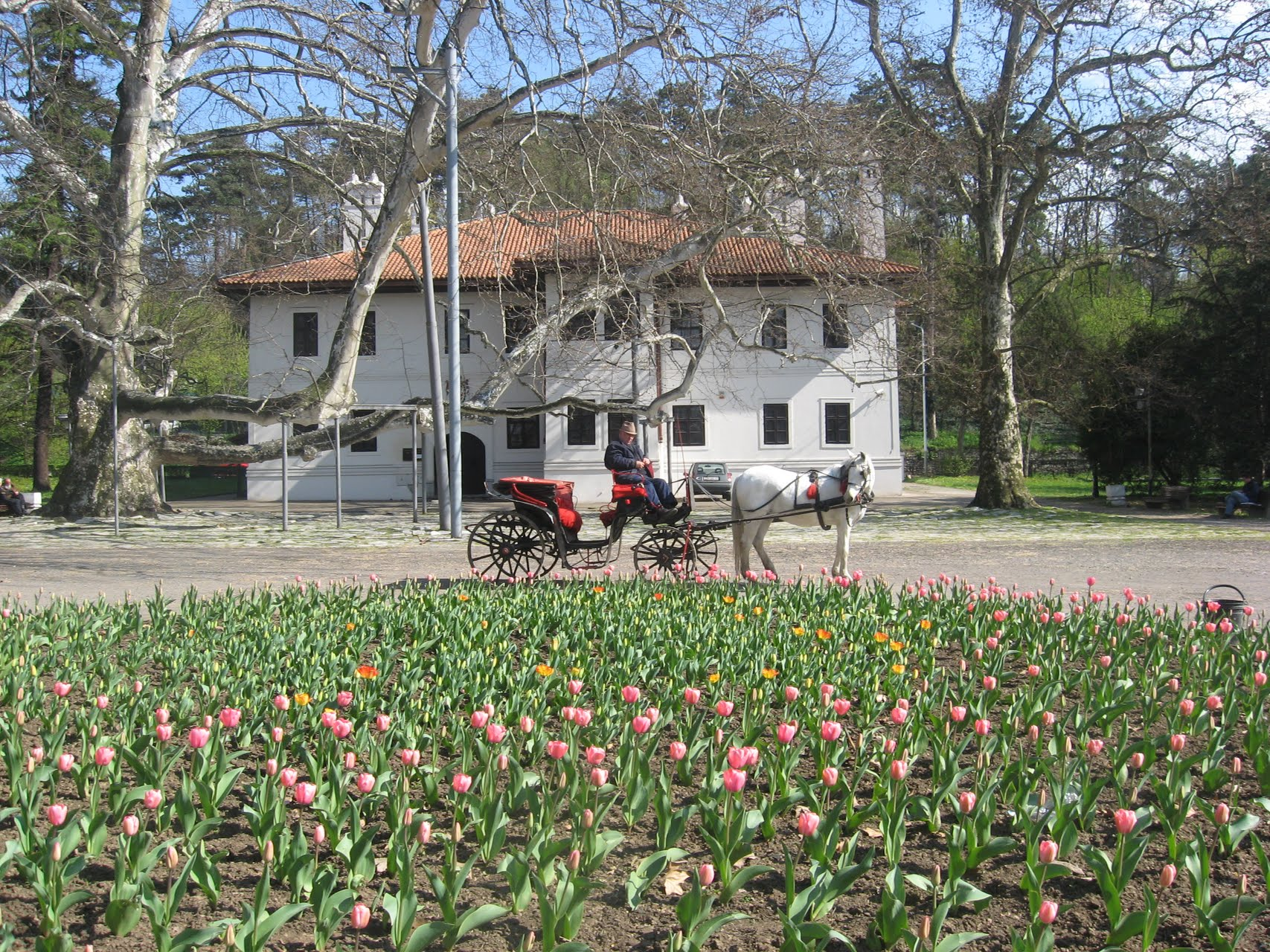
Residence of Prince Miloš, built from 1831 to 1833

Prince of Serbia Miloš Obrenović specifically chose this location. After Serbia gained autonomy, the Ottomans withdrew to the walled cities. As the range of the cannons from the Belgrade Fortress couldn't reach across the Topčiderska reka, the prince selected this area for his future royal compound. The history of the park itself begins in 1830 when Prince Miloš started building his personal quarters in the swampy terrain of the Topčider, today one of the major attractions in Belgrade, the famous Residence of Prince Miloš. A stone Topčider church, dedicated to the apostles Peter and Paul, church inn and military complex were also constructed in the 1832–1834 period, so as the various barracks, magazines, ice rooms, meyhane and a guard tower on top of the Topčidersko Brdo. There was a wooden pavilion, which served as part of the Russian military hospital during the 1876 Serbian-Ottoman War. Hundreds of workers were employed. At one point, 144 tajfe, or bands of construction workers, were employed. Prince Miloš paid them heftily, gave them certain privileges, but they had no working hours, and had to work until the job is done.

Planting of the surrounding park began at the same time and marked the beginning of the planned green areas in Belgrade as the ensuing park was the first park area in the city. The park was patterned after the English parks. The supervisor of the park's construction was Atanasije Nikolić, engineer, urbanist and professor at the Belgrade Lyceum, who also arranged the nursery garden, Košutnjak Park and avenues along city's main streets and squares (Terazije, Kneza Miloša Street, modern Bulevar Kneza Aleksandra Karađorđevića), with the seedlings which originated from the Topčoder nursery.

In 1839, Belgrade merchant Joca Đ. Jovanović applied for permit to build the first brewery in town. He wanted to build it in Topčider, but the permit was denied. On 24 May 1860, privately owned predecessor of the public transport in Belgrade was organized. The omnibus line was operated by the diligences. Its starting point was at the kafana "Kod Zlatnog Venca" in Terazije, while the line ended in Topčider. Apparently, it wasn't a lucrative business move so the owner Luka Jakovljević sold it in 1861 to Milan Tešić, who expanded the line from Terazije to Varoš Kapija and lifted the price to 3 groschen.

The importance which Topčider gained for the city population can be seen from the fact that in 1884 it got its own railway station even though it was a small settlement at the time and also one of the first tram lines in Belgrade used to connect Terazije and Topčider, through the Kneza Miloša street. Starting in downtown, at Prince Mihailo Monument, the tram was allocated the number 3, which it still bears today, though its route is today extended to the neighborhood of Kneževac.

=== 20th century ===
According to the Belgrade's first general urban plan, from 1924, the Belgrade Zoo and the new botanical garden were to be built in Topčider. The plan also envisioned forestation of Topčidersko Brdo and Senjak, formation of the new park and establishment of the continuous green area with the Topčider. Project started in 1926 while the Hyde Park was finished in the 1930s. International tender which was supposed to reconstruct Topčider by the standards of the then modern urbanism was halted by World War II.

When Serbia began using paper money, the banknotes were printed in France until 1929, when the Banknotes printing office was built in Topčider, close to the railway station. However, the coins were minted on another location, in the privately owned company "The brothers Bošković mint" in the nearby street, today named Bulevar vojvode Mišića. In the mid-1930s a big affair broke out, concerning the counterfeiting of the coins of 50 dinars, so the Banknotes printing office also took over that job. It was always colloquially called the "Mint".

After the Karađorđević royal family moved in the new Dedinje Royal Compound in Dedinje in the 1930s, a modern military barracks were built in Topčider, as a headquarters of the royal guard. Additional military objects were also built, including the military farm. Park was partially adapted, with gazebos, bridges, etc. Railway station became the "royal station", while after World War II it became the home station of the Josip Broz Tito's famed Blue Train.

After 1945 city urbanists considered that the way the Topčider-Košutnjak complex had been handled was wrong, especially the expansion of the railway station into the marshalling yard and the construction of Filmski Grad, so Belgrade's General Urbanistic Plan (GUP) in the 1950s projected the complete removal of the railway objects from the Topčider valley, but this was never implemented. In the summer of 1948 a swimming pool was built in the military complex of the Guard. Though within the army complex, it was a public swimming pool, one of only few such venues in Belgrade at the time.

=== 21st century ===
In the early 2016, a gradual moving of trains from the Belgrade Main railway station to the new Belgrade Centre railway station, colloquially called Prokop station began. In December 2017, all but two national trains were dislocated to "Belgrade Center". However, problems arose immediately. The Prokop is still not finished, has no station building nor proper access roads and public transportation connections with the rest of the city. Additionally, it has no facilities for loading and unloading cars from the auto trains nor was ever planned to have one. Still, in January 2018 it was announced that the station will be completely closed for traffic on 1 July 2018, even though none of the projects needed for a complete removal of the railway traffic are finished. The Prokop is incomplete, a projected main freight station in Zemun is not being adapted at all while there is even no project on a Belgrade railway beltway so a series of temporary solutions will have to be applied. One is a defunct and deteriorated Topčider station, which will be revitalized and adapted for auto trains until the goods station Zemun is finished. Topčider station has one major flaw, a bad public transportation connection (only one tram line, No. 3), so the state railway company asked officially for this problem to be solved. A deadline for the Zemun station is 2 years, but the work is not scheduled to begin until the end of 2018. As of July 2019 no construction began.

== Administration ==
By 1883, Topčider had a population of 767, and though part of Belgrade, it wasn't organized as a quarter of the city, like the central urban area. According to the censuses, the population was 1,675 in 1890, 2,815 in 1895, 2,818 in 1900, 3,534 in 1905 and 3,510 in 1910.

After the liberation in World War I in 1918, Topčider came under Belgrade's administrative rule. It was organized as a Topčider-Senjak section of Belgrade, which had a population of 8,476 in 1921.

In the second half of the 20th century, the part which was within the Savski Venac municipality was organized as a local community (mesna zajednica), a sub-municipal administrative unit. It was named Topčidersko Brdo and had a population of 5,333 in 1981. It was then merged with Senjak again in the Topčidersko Brdo-Senjak local community which had a population of 7,757 in 1991, 7,249 in 2002 and 6,344 in 2011.

== Wildlife ==
=== Plants ===
Tree planting began immediately after the konak construction in the 1830s. In the 19th century it was the first nursery garden in Serbia,. Most abundant species are platanus, black pine, spruce and field maple. The Topčider London planes (Platanus × hispanica) are today among the oldest ones in Europe. The biggest and oldest specimen was 34 m (112 ft) high in 2008, with the diameter of the deck being 55 m (180 ft), while the shade of its crown covers an area of 1,400 m^{2} (15,000 sq ft). Some sources claim it was planted in 1834 when prince Miloš ordered for a seedling to be planted in the lime kiln in front of the konak. Other, more reliable sources say the tree was planted in 1868, when 250 seedlings of Platanus were bought in Vienna, Austro-Hungary, for which a receipt still exist today. In 2015 it measured 37 m (121 ft) in height and was estimated to be 160 years old, while the crown has grown to 1,885 m^{2} (20,290 sq ft) and is now supported by the 17 metal piles. The tree is declared a natural monument.

Even older is the almost 180-year-old pear tree, nicknamed Kruška topčiderka ("Pear of Topčider") According to popular legend, it was planted by prince Miloš a few years after the konak was finished. He wanted to redeem himself to his wife princess Ljubica because of his frequent infidelities and in front of the pear seedling swore his loyalty to her. It still bears fruits, so attempts are being made to produce its seedling in the greenhouse. The pear is surrounded by five pedunculate oaks, all of which are over 100 years old.

Special feature in the park is the group of 8 swamp cypresses.

In 2015, most of the trees in Topčider were 20 to 70 years old, but a significant number of trees was over 100 years old or from the 19th century.

=== Animals ===
Topčider is home to 26 species of dragonflies, 48 species of orthoptera and 153 species of beetles. Birds include collared dove, white wagtail, common blackbird, warbler, grey heron and great spotted woodpecker. Mammals present in the park, among others, are squirrels, moles, hedgehogs, voles and bats.

== Monuments and other features ==
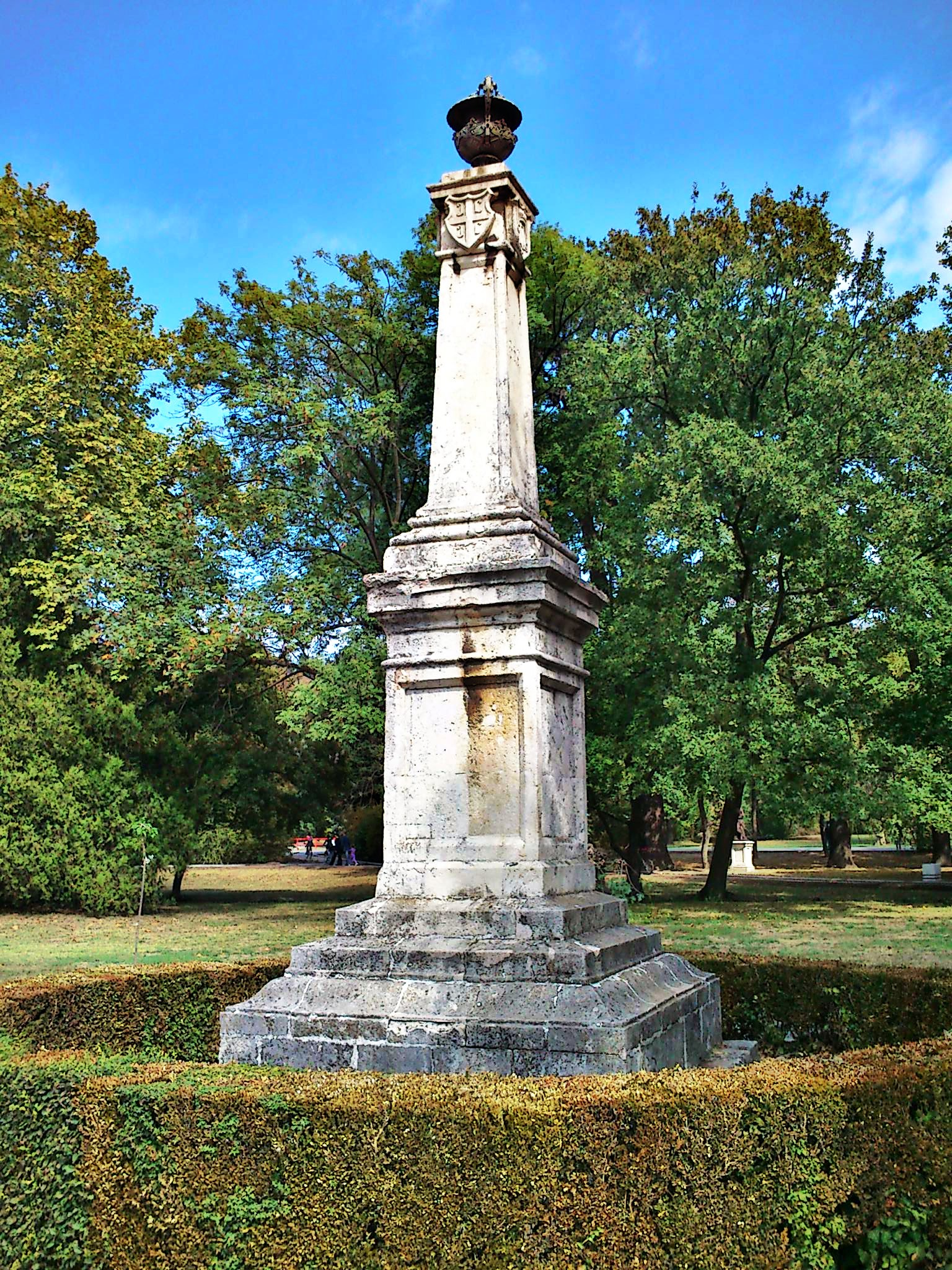
Obelisk

Topčider was the first public park outside the central city area. Today, the total area of Topčider is 35 ha (86 acres), out of which 12.8 ha (32 acres) is covered by the park. The entire Košutnjak-Topčider forest complex covers an area of 3.46 km^{2} (1.34 sq mi).

Many other monuments are centered on the konak:

- binjektaš stone ("hopping stone") which prince Miloš used to jump on a horse;
- Museum of the First Serbian Uprising, in the konak itself;
- four public fountains, with an additional fifth one with lion's heads which was temporarily moved to Topčider in 1911, but restored in 1976 and returned to its original location in Terazije. Two are drinking fountains (Miloš' and Vračar's, built from 1858 to 1860), while the third and fourth are decorative fountains (Great Fount, from the 1920s, and Little Fount, built in the 1980s);
- "Woman harvester" monument, the first park monument in Belgrade. It was sculptured by the Austrian Fidelis Kimmel in 1852;
- stone obelisk erected in 1859, one of the first public monuments in Belgrade. It was erected by prince Miloš to mark his return to power in 1858;
- bronze monument to the Swiss doctor and philanthropist Archibald Reiss, sculptured by Marko Brežanin in 1931.

The northern section of Topčider is the location of the Topčider cemetery (with the Orthodox church of Saint Trifun) and the Banknotes printing office (Zavod za izradu novčanica), that is, the mint of the National Bank of Serbia. In the western section, bordering with Dedinje is Beli Dvor, a court of the Serbian former royal dynasty Karađorđević and the present residence of the pretender Aleksandar Karađorđević and his family.

== Protection ==
Topčider was declared a spatial cultural-historical unit in 1987, and placed under the state protection.

The Great Platanus, in front of the konak, was protected as the natural monument in 2001. As the city government declared the entire Topčider Park a natural monument on 23 June 2015, specific protection for the Platanus ceased. In the area of the residential Obrenović dynasty complex, there are six objects which are protected as the cultural monuments: Residence of Prince Miloš, Topčider Church, Church Inn, Obelisk, monument to Archibald Reiss and the "Woman harvester" monument.

Northwest section of the Topčider was declared a geological natural monument of "Maša's Quarry". The location is an archaeological excavation site as the fossils of the Mesozoic fish have been found in the sediment layers from the Late Cretaceous. It was named Mašin majdan ("Maša's quarry"), after a quarry owned by Manojlo Maša Dimić who lived in the house above the quarry. He was among the first wealthy Belgraders who built villas in Topčider. The quarry was operational until the 1920s and the stone from the quarry was used for the villas on Topčider and Dedinje, but also for the construction of the nearby railroad, paving of Belgrade streets with cobblestone. As the quarry was used before the urbanization of Topčider it is known that the stone was used during the construction of the Prince Miloš' Residence.

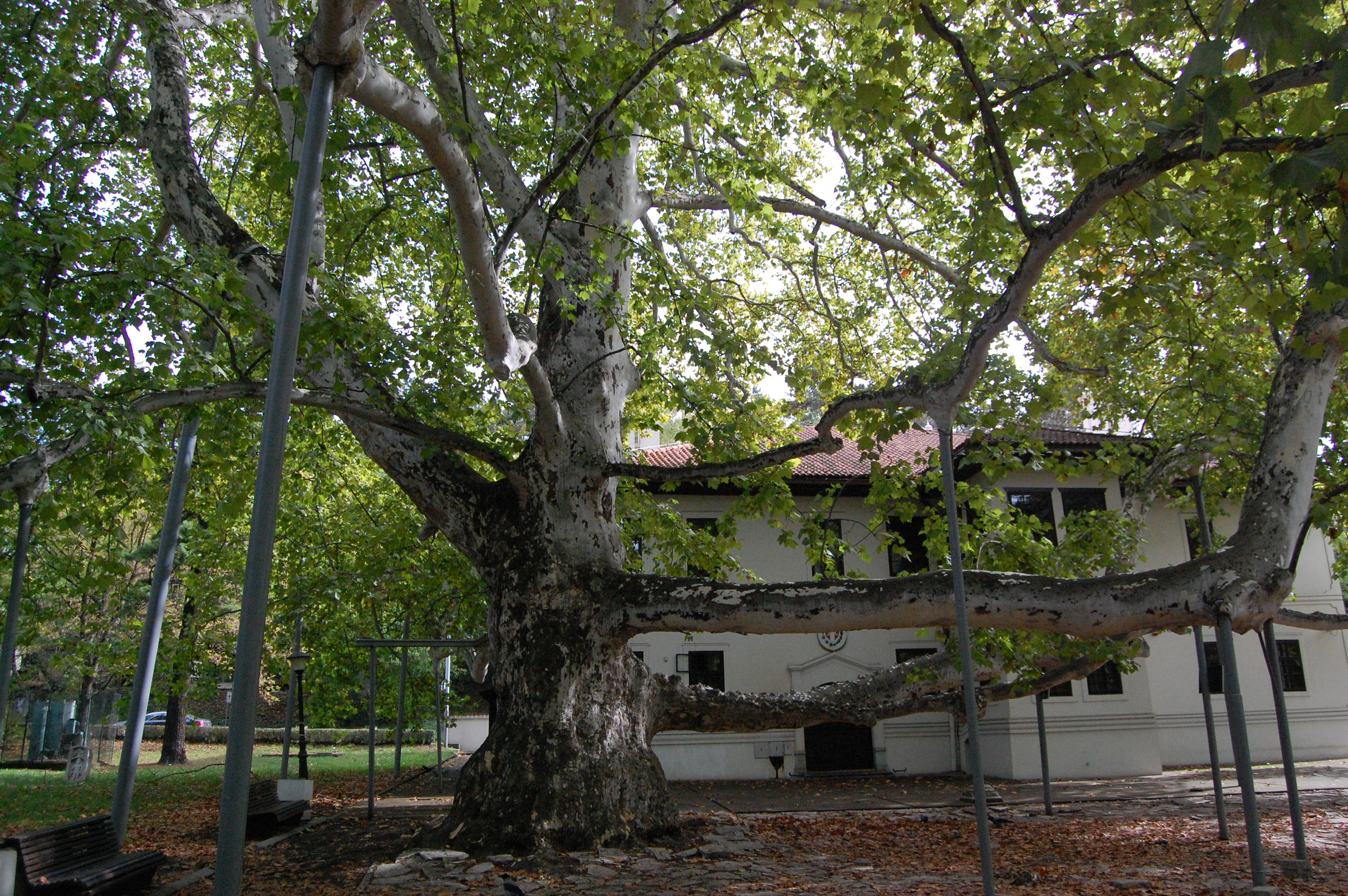
The largest London plane

On the location of the former quarry, the Topčider summer stage was built in 1947. It had 1,800 seats and an excellent acoustics, being embedded into the limestone rocks. A project of Rajko Tatić, despite occasional public actions for its restoration (1999, 2009), by the 2010s the facility was abandoned and deteriorated. The summer complex includes a restaurant, built in 1950, and several auxiliary objects, designed by Radivoj Gibarac.

The ridge was originally protected in 1969 as the "Senonian Sandbank of Maša's Quarry". It is placed under the II category of protection, and covers 4.29 hectares (10.6 acres). The status was revised in 2014 when it was renamed to "Maša's Quarry". The area is scientifically important for stratigraphy, paleontology and petrology reasons. It originates rom the period when the ancient ocean Neotethys, which covered the entire area of modern Serbia, was being closed in this section due to the plate tectonics. Largest part of the sandbank's geology profile is made of Lower Cretaceous limestone (Urgonian Limestone), visible from the entrance into the summer stage, stretching along its length, and Upper Cretaceous limestone, or the Senonian (at the very entrance). Urgonian layers originated 125 million ybp and 20 metres (66 ft) high. It contains lenses of marl, sandstone and claystone, and is rich in fossilized sea shells, sea snails and corals. This limestone was commercially used. Senonian section is dated to 80 million years ago, and is also rich in fossils. As of 2022, Maša's Quarry is the only geological natural monument in Belgrade, out of five, which has no officially appointed administrator.

== Controversies ==
=== Topčider Tunnel ===
There are threats of destroying certain parts of the park because the government is planning to build a tunnel in this area which will connect Autokomanda with this part of the city and hopefully solve many car traffic problems in Belgrade. Some environmental groups protested against this project, but the constructing of this tunnel still hasn't progressed further than the idea stage. During the summer of 2007, a general planning idea will be chosen by a tender held by the city government, and it remains to be seen if this plan will contain a solution for park preservation. Ada Bridge, which is part of the same project (Inner ring road) was built and opened on 1 January 2012, but the construction of the tunnel under Senjak, which should free Topčider from heavy traffic, was postponed due to the heavy costs.

In the early 2018, city administration announced that the detailed regulatory plan and the conceptual design are finished, while the invitation to tender for the project was set for later in 2018.

The tunnel would start at the large Radnička interchange, at the beginning of the bridge. That way, it would practically make an extension of the Požeška Street, the main street and commercial area of the neighborhoods of Čukarica and Banovo Brdo. The tunnel would then exit at Partizan Stadium, on the other side of Topčidersko Brdo, above the Autokomanda. The tunnel will allow for the drivers to circumvent the downtown and to allow faster transit. It is planned as part of Belgrade's Inner magistral semi-ring.

=== Lisičji Potok ===
The easternmost section of Topčider is a heavily wooded area, so the expansion of the neighborhood of Lisičji Potok was limited. In the early 2000s, due to the political changes which caused a vacuum in all levels of government, private entrepreneurs without gaining regular permits cut down over 1,000 trees in the Topčider woods for the purpose of constructing vast apartment complexes.

=== Topčider Case ===
The vast secret military complex of "Karaš" (in Teodora Drajzera street) was built and dug into the hill from 1965 to 1980, with numerous barracks and kilometers of underground passages.

In October 2004, two young guards, Dragan Jakovljević and Dražen Milovanović, were found shot dead under highly mysterious circumstances. The first official army report stated that the two guards got into a fight; one got shot, and the other one committed suicide. The investigation was so obviously sloppy (videos were made public of investigators walking all over the non-secured crime scene, not using any precaution measures or security protocols, etc.) to the point of absurdity, including the notorious statement of then military prosecutor Vuk Tufegdžić who stated that no DNA tests were done because DNA is an "overrated thing" and that "people watch TV too much". Because of the serious rumours and intense public pressure, a more thorough investigation was initiated, this time headed by Božo Prelević, former interior minister of Serbia. His commission concluded that the two soldiers were shot by a third party but the exact situation has never been clarified, except that the commission reject almost all findings of the first, internal military investigation. Not having any solid evidence or conclusions, it is widely suggested by the press that the two guards were the witnesses of either a high-profile indictee (as it was suggested at the time, Ratko Mladić) of the International Criminal Tribunal for the Former Yugoslavia, who was supposedly hiding in the undergrounds of the Topčider complex, or some criminal activities, like smuggling.

== See also ==
- Belgrade
- Spatial Cultural-Historical Units of Great Importance

== Sources ==
- Mala Prosvetina Enciklopedija, Third edition (1985); Prosveta; ISBN 86-07-00001-2
- Jovan Đ. Marković (1990): Enciklopedijski geografski leksikon Jugoslavije; Svjetlost-Sarajevo; ISBN 86-01-02651-6
