= Stadion, Belgrade =

Stadion, Belgrade Стадион
- Urban neighbourhood
- Location within Belgrade
- Coordinates: 44°47′20″N 20°27′33″E
- Country: Serbia
- Region: Belgrade
- Municipality: Savski Venac
- Time zone: UTC+1 (CET)
  - Summer (DST): UTC+2 (CEST)
- Area code: +381(0)11
- Car plates: BG

Stadion (Serbian Cyrillic: Стадион) is an urban neighborhood of Belgrade, the capital of Serbia. It is located in Belgrade's municipality of Savski Venac.

== Location ==
Stadion is located just west of the neighborhood of Autokomanda. It also borders the neighborhoods of Dedinje to the west, Diplomatska Kolonija to the south and Voždovac to the east. It is bordered by the Ljutice Bogdana and Dr Milutina Ivkovica streets and the Boulevard of prince Alexander Karađorđević. In between, it also includes the streets of Maglajska, Sime Lukina Lazića, Ružićeva, Jezdićeva and Šekspirova.

== Characteristics ==
Stadion is a small neighborhood, named so because it spreads between two largest association football stadiums in Belgrade (stadion, Serbian for stadium), those of Partizan and Red Star Belgrade (Marakana). The area is entirely residential, with two small parks on its ends, elongated one along the boulevard and triangular one, pointed to Autokomanda.

The larger of two parks spreads along the Prince Alexander Karađorđević Boulevard. Named after banker and politician Bencion Buli, it is officially classified as an urban forest and covers an area of 4.03 ha (10.0 acres). The plane tree avenue along the modern Dr Milutina Ivkovica Street was planted in the first half of the 1930s.

Due to its location within the wider sports complex which includes two major stadiums, and being a sub-neighborhood of the Belgrade's most affluent neighborhood of Dedinje, the real estate in Stadion are quite pricey, with high taxation. The area has undergone gentrification, with former industrial buildings being sold off at public auctions. In 2023, bus routes were changed to include coverage of the Stadion area.
