= Lisičji Potok =

Lisičji Potok Лисичји Поток
- Urban neighbourhood
- Location within Belgrade
- Coordinates: 44°45′50″N 20°27′19″E
- Country: Serbia
- Region: Belgrade
- Municipality: Savski Venac
- Time zone: UTC+1 (CET)
  - Summer (DST): UTC+2 (CEST)
- Area code: +381(0)11
- Car plates: BG

Lisičji Potok (Serbian Cyrillic: Лисичји Поток, romanized: Fox Creek) is an urban neighborhood of Belgrade, the capital of Serbia. It is located in Belgrade's municipality of Savski Venac.

== Location ==
Lisičji Potok is located in the eastern section of the municipality. It stretches in the north-south direction, in the valley between the Topčider and Banjica hills and neighborhoods, connecting the neighborhoods of Dedinje on the north and Kanarevo Brdo on the south. On the northern tip of the neighborhood is the Beli Dvor, a court of the Serbian former royal dynasty Karađorđević and the present residence of the pretender Aleksandar Karađorđević and his family.

== Characteristics ==
In 2010, total forest area of Lisičji Potok covered 7.44 hectares (18.4 acres).

=== King's drinking fountain ===
Halfway between the Beli Dvor and the seat of the local community Košutnjak, there is a drinking fountain which is built at the spring of the Lisičji Potok creek. The spring used to provide water for the Royal Compound. Named King's drinking fountain (Serbian Cyrillic: Краљева чесма, Kraljeva česma), it was built and consecrated on 5 July 1936 when it was ceremonially handed over to Belgrade's mayor Vlada Ilić. The fountain was dedicated to King Alexander I Karađorđević, who was assassinated in Marseilles, on 9 October 1934.

The fountain complex is symmetrical. The fountain is embedded into the earthen-stone balcony. The central section is square shaped, with an arch and water pipe placed into it. Two lower flanks end with four arch-like steps each, which actually make the access to the fountain. On the rock above the fountain there was a memorial plaque but was destroyed by the new authorities after World War II. The water pours out from stylized lion head. It was designed by the Russian émigré architect Nikolay Krasnov. Until World War II, the location at the fountain was used for numerous, especially children and pupils gatherings.

After the Partisans liberated Belgrade from Germans in the fall of 1944, the new Communist authorities conducted reprisals and organized massive executions of population. Out of some 20 such locations, Lisičji Potok was the largest execution location of this kind in Belgrade, with over 1,000 people being executed here, organized by the OZNA security agency. The executions on the location continued to 1946. Location was then neglected for decades. By the 2010s, it was endangered by the uncontrolled urbanization of the neighborhood. In October 2018 it was announced that there are plans to revitalize the fountain, to arrange access paths to it and to form a small park around it. The park would also include a small, stone-made amphitheater, newly planted trees and flowers, benches and a cross-shaped monument dedicated to the victims of the Communist regime. The monument, a 1 m (3 ft 3 in) tall granite cross attached to the rock, was erected. It was vandalized in November 2019, and replaced with the wooden cross. The fountain itself was vandalized with graffiti, but was cleaned later.

In the 21st century, due to the massive urbanization of the surrounding area, the water from the fountain was declared unsuitable for drinking. Since 2017, annual commemorations in early November are held. Groups of self-organized citizens, family members of the executed ones, take care of the location which remains in bad shape. The fountain is clogged and soaks the surrounding area, but city communal companies claim they have no authority over it. In September 2021, Belgrade's Institute for the Cultural Monuments Protection announced that in the first half of 2022 they will announce the reconstruction and restoration project for the fountain. City representatives in November 2021 confirmed that the complex will become a city's memorial park in 2022, but the works were postponed for 2023.

The fountain was restored to its 1936 appearance and re-opened on 9 October 2023, on the 89th anniversary of the Alexander I Karađorđević, to whom it was originally dedicated and named after.

== Controversies ==
Lisičji Potok used to be rarely inhabited wooded area and it was chosen as a location for the military depot for medical supplies. However, the usage was later switched to ammunition depot and the neighborhood soon began to develop in the vicinity. On June 13, 1994, a thunder struck the depot causing powerful explosions. Immediate evacuation of Lisičji Potok and the nearby neighborhoods of Kanarevo Brdo and Miljakovac began as it seemed that the fire won't be subdued, but the heavy rain began to fall, so the fire was eventually extinguished.

Being in a heavily wooded area, the expansion of the neighborhood was limited. In the early 2000s, due to the political changes which caused a vacuum in all levels of government, private entrepreneurs without gaining regular permits cut down over 1,000 trees for the purpose of constructing vast apartment complexes.
