= Diplomatska Kolonija =

Diplomatska Kolonija Дипломатска Колонија
- Urban neighbourhood
- Location within Belgrade
- Coordinates: 44°46′46″N 20°27′35″E
- Country: Serbia
- Region: Belgrade
- Municipality: Savski Venac
- Time zone: UTC+1 (CET)
  - Summer (DST): UTC+2 (CEST)
- Area code: +381(0)11
- Car plates: BG

Diplomatska Kolonija (Serbian Cyrillic: Дипломатска Колонија) is an urban neighborhood of Belgrade, the capital of Serbia. It is located in Belgrade's municipality of Savski Venac.

Diplomatska kolonija is a small sub-neighborhood of Dedinje, located in its eastern section, right behind the Dragiša Mišović hospital and south of the Rajko Mitić Stadium, football stadium of the FK Crvena Zvezda. The neighborhood of Stadion is just north of it. It is generally centered on the street of the same name Diplomatska kolonija (Serbian for "diplomatic colony"). It is considered a fancy and expensive area of Belgrade, with new building of RTV Pink in the western section of the neighborhood.

A street crossing the diplomatic colony, is the Serdar Jola street, which is one of the most beautiful streets in Dedinje.
