= École Française de Belgrade =

International French school in Belgrade, Serbia

Coordinates: 44.792583°N 20.445197°E

École Française de Belgrade Serbian: Француска Школа у Београду

Location
- Senjak, Belgrade; Serbia

Information
- Established: 1951; 74 years ago
- Teaching staff: 80
- Enrollment: c.500 (2018)
- Language: French
- Website: efb.rs/en/accueil-english/

École Française de Belgrade (Serbian: Француска Школа у Београду) is an international French school in Belgrade, the capital of Serbia. It is composed of a preschool (maternelle), primary school (école primaire), junior high (collège), and high school (lycée). It was founded in 1951. Nowadays it has about 500 pupils and about 80 staff (as of 2018). It is located in Belgrade, in the neighborhood of Senjak.
