= Geca Kon =

Serbian publisher (1873–1941)

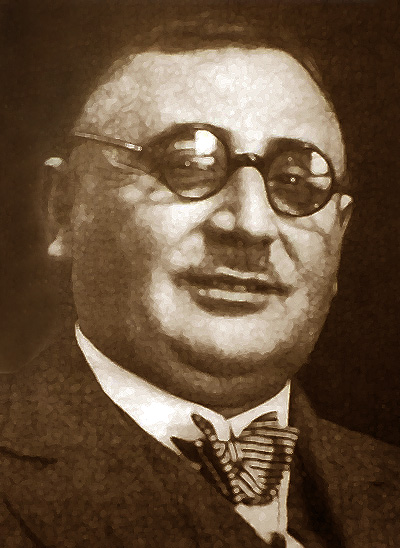
Geca Kon

Geca Kon also spelled Gaetz Kohn (Serbian Cyrillic: Геца Кон; 2 August 1873 – 1941) was a Hungarian-Serbian bookstore owner and publisher. He established a bookstore in Belgrade, Serbia in 1901, and in 1905 he started his publishing business there under the name "Geca Kon a.d." In the interwar period, his company was the largest book publisher in Yugoslavia. During the 1930s, he published about 200 books a year, and earned large income. In 1929, he was elected president of the Society of Serbian publishers. Kon established several very popular editorial collections and financed young writers to boost their career.

After the start of World War II and German occupation of Serbia, Kon, who was Jewish, was arrested together with his whole family by the Nazis. They were all killed in the Holocaust. After the war and the establishment of Communist Yugoslavia, Kon's publishing company was nationalized and became a state-owned enterprise Prosveta, one of the largest publishing houses in Yugoslavia.

== Early life ==
Kon was born in Jewish family in 1873 in Csantaver, Kingdom of Hungary (now in Serbia). His father Bernard Kohn was a rich rabbi. Several years after Geca's birth, the family moved to Zemun (then also in the Kingdom of Hungary, now in Serbia) where Geca's father was a school principal. After finishing elementary school in Zemun, Kon enrolled in the trading school in Zemun, then in the Gymnasium in Novi Sad, but soon left education and started to work.

Kon, then 16, moved to Belgrade, Serbia, in 1889. In Belgrade, he found work in the bookshop owned by Friedrich Breslauer. He worked in the shop until 1894, then moved to Novi Sad, staying there for a year and working as a manager in a bookshop owned by Arsa Pajević. A year later, he moved back to Belgrade, working in the Friedman bookstore, where he met his future wife Elza Wiles who also worked there. In 1901, Koca Kon officially became the citizen of the Kingdom of Serbia.

Kon married Elsa in 1902. They had two daughters, Elvira and Malvina.

== Publishing career ==
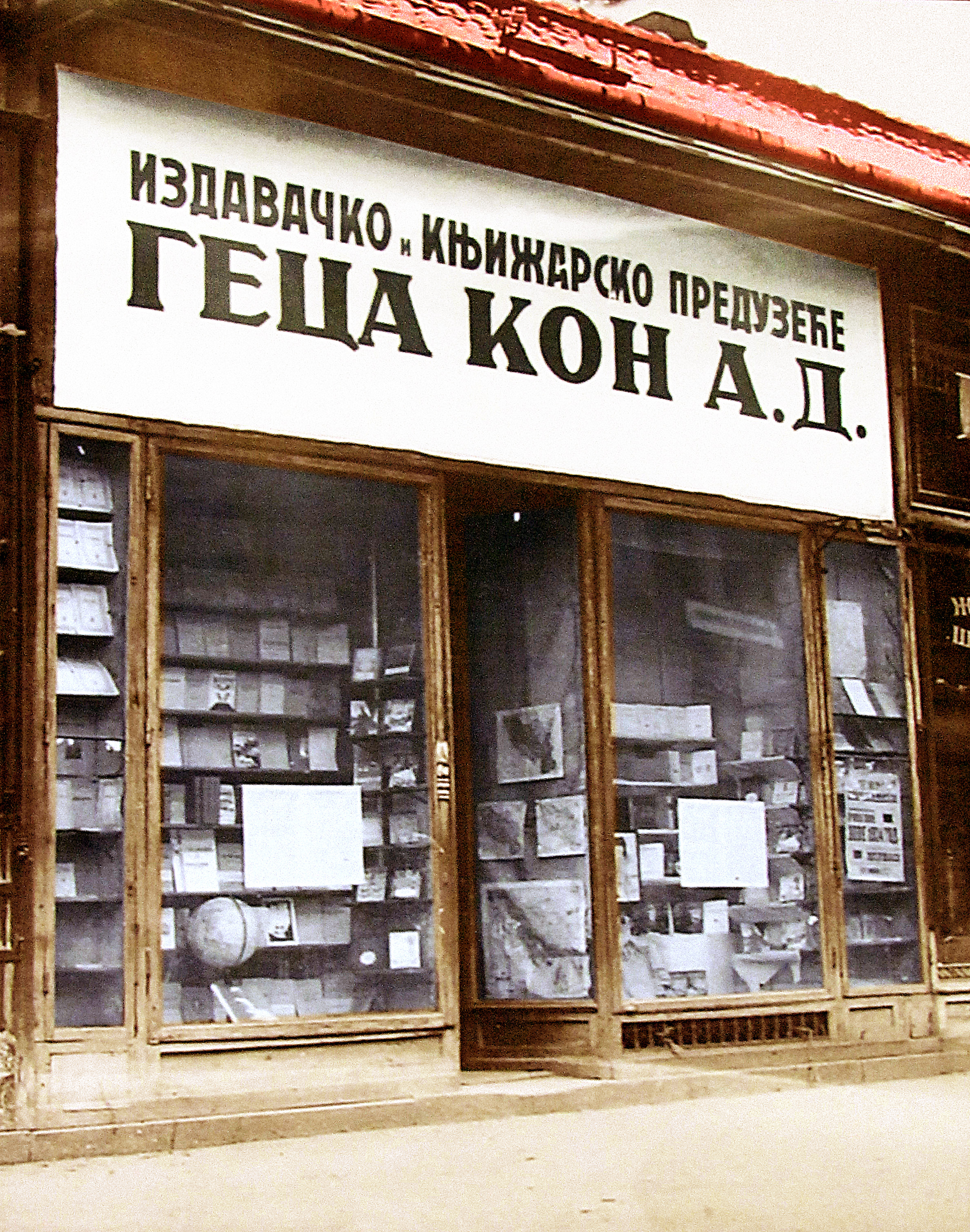
Geca Kon's bookstore during his lifetime

In 1901, Kon established his own bookstore. In 1905, he also started publishing books, the first book being "Sintaksa srpskog jezika za srednje škole" (Syntax of Serbian Language for High Schools) by Janko Lukić. The book sell well, so two years later, he published a translation of Niccolò Machiavelli's The Prince, and then many more books by Serbian and foreign writers. Kon was innovative businessman. He was the first book publisher in Serbia who offered books on repayment via travelling salesmen. He also financed Serbian writers and writers' associations, so they can write books in peace, the books he will publish later. In 1906 he began publishing the journal Archives of Law and Social Sciences. The first catalogue of books of his publications Gece Kona came out in 1910. The catalogue contained 50 books, a selection that included many famous Serbian writers, including Mihailo Gavrilović, Slobodan Jovanović, Toma Živanović, Stojan Novaković and Gojko Niketić.

During the World War I, Belgrade was occupied by the Austro-Hungarian army. Kon was arrested by the occupiers and sent to prisoners' camp in Neusiedl am See, Austria, where he was held until 1918. His company was closed during the occupation and the books from his bookstore printed in English, French and Russian were publicly burnt by the occupiers.

After the end of World War I, Kon returned to Belgrade and continued his business. When the first Serbian Society of book publishers was established in 1921, Kon became its vice-president, and in 1929 was elected president of the Society. 1930s were especially successful years for Kon's company. His company became the largest book publisher in Yugoslavia with over 200 new books published yearly. This made Kon a rich man. He built a new villa in Dobračina street and moved there in 1924. He was also one of the first Belgraders to own a private luxury car. In this period, he spent a lot of money financing Serbian writers. He started several very popular editorial collections including the famous "Plava ptica" collection of young adult novels. From his premises in Belgrade he published over 3,500 books before his business was closed in 1941.

Kon also had several enemies who publicly attacked him. He was attacked for being Jewish in the antisemitic journal Balkan. The journal falsely claimed that Kon was an Austro-Hungarian soldier in the World War I fighting against the Serbs.

== Death and legacy ==
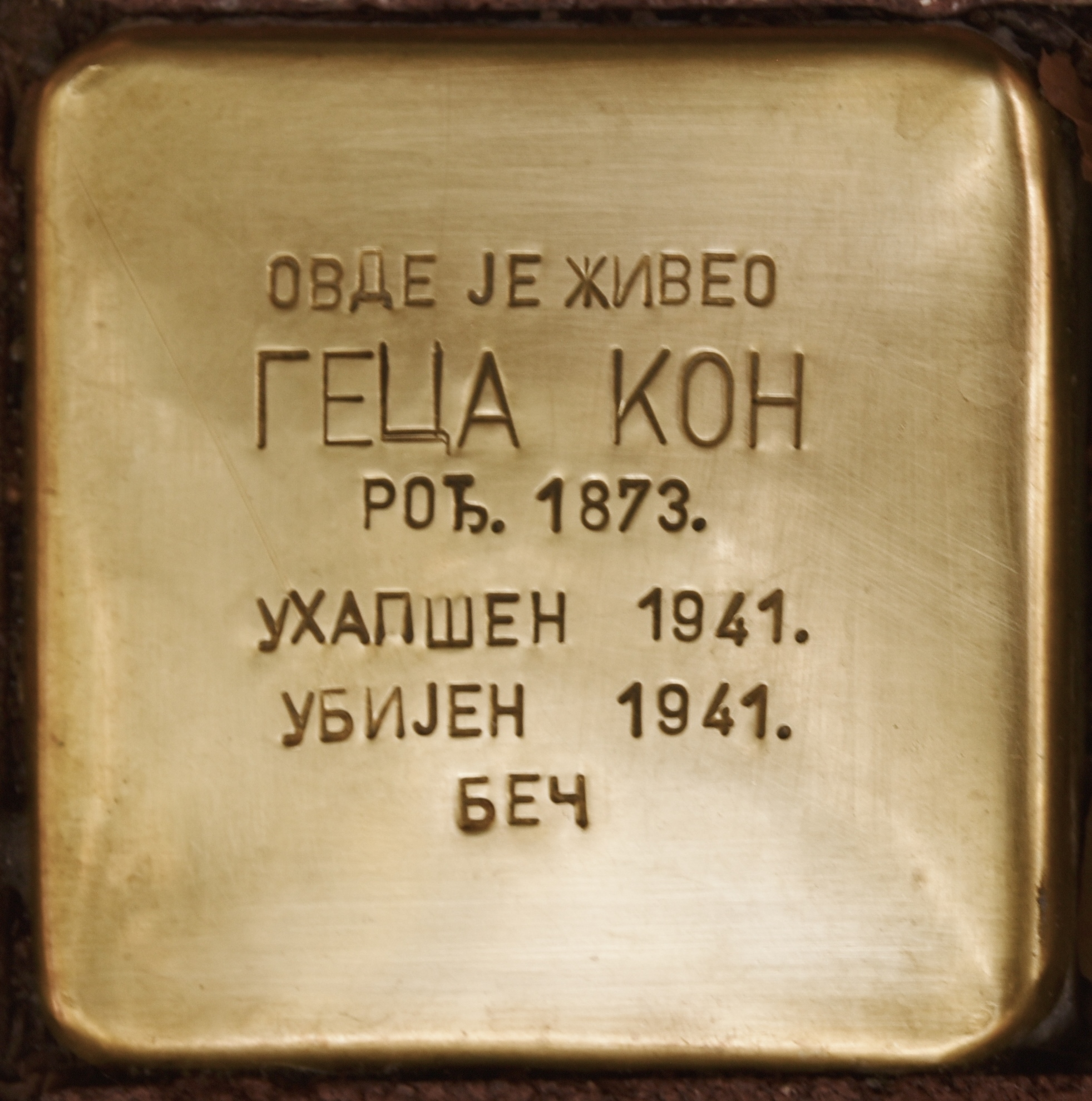
Geca Kon's Stolperstein in front of his villa in the Dobračina street

When the German army occupied Serbia in 1941, Kon relocated briefly to Vrnjačka Banja, where he was arrested. He was moved to Sajmište concentration camp near Belgrade, and later to Austria, where he was executed. His wife and daughters, alongside other family members, were all killed by the Nazis in the town of Jabuka near Pančevo.

Kon's company was taken by the Germans who appointed a new manager Adolf Mosbek, a Nazi party member from Vienna. In August 1941, German businessmen established new publishing company in Belgrade named Jugoistok. In the summer if 1943, German commissariat sold the Geca Kon company to Jugoistok. After the end of the World War II and the establishment of the Socialist Yugoslavia, the government decided to nationalize Kon's company and bookstore, as well as all of his former property. This was the basis for the establishment of the state-owned Prosveta. Prosveta continued many of the editorial collections started by Kon before the war, including the famous Plava ptica.

In 1995, Prosveta established Geca Kon award for best book on the history of books and publishing. In 2016, the Bavarian State Library returned 203 out of 600 books that the Nazis took from Geca Kon. The rest were not found and were probably destroyed in the Allied bombing of Munich. Since there were no living relatives of Kon, the books were inherited by the National Library of Serbia.

=== Bookstore ===
In the early 20th century, Geca Kon's bookstore operated from several locales in the center of Belgrade, and in 1932 settled at the address 12 Knez Mihailova Street. Prior to World War II it was the largest bookstore in the Balkans, with 700 pages of its 1938 catalogue featuring 16,000 titles. After the World War II, the bookstore became part of the Prosveta company, but the name "Geca Kon Bookstore" was kept. It kept its original interior until 1990 when it was renovated and modernized. In 1993, a memorial plaque dedicated to Geca Kon was unveiled inside the bookstore. In 2009, the building was declared a monument of culture. Prosveta was privatized in 2009, but the contract was annulled in 2010, after which the Government took over. This ignited fears that the bookstore might be closed for the first time since 1918. In June 2019, the bookstore was flooded after a storm and then closed for renovation in 2020.

In 2020, Prosveta concluded a contract with state-owned publisher Službeni Glasnik who took over the management of the bookstore. The renovated Geca Kon bookstore was opened in February 2021. It was remodeled in the spirit of the original design, with wood panels around the store windows and the entry door with the mechanism from the 1930s. The upper floor includes a memorial space with fully restored furniture and Kon's personal items.

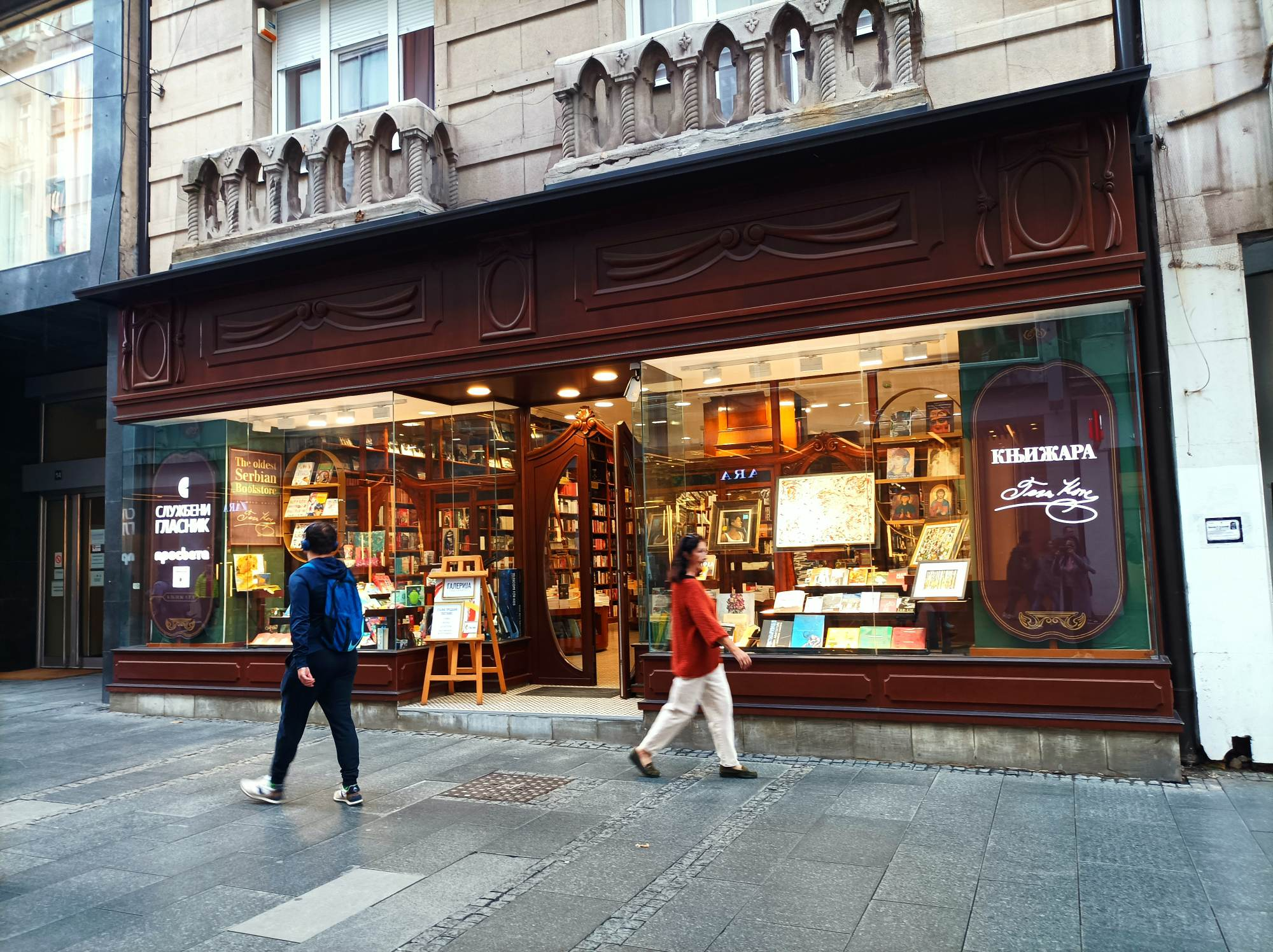
Geca Kon bookstore in 2022, after renovation

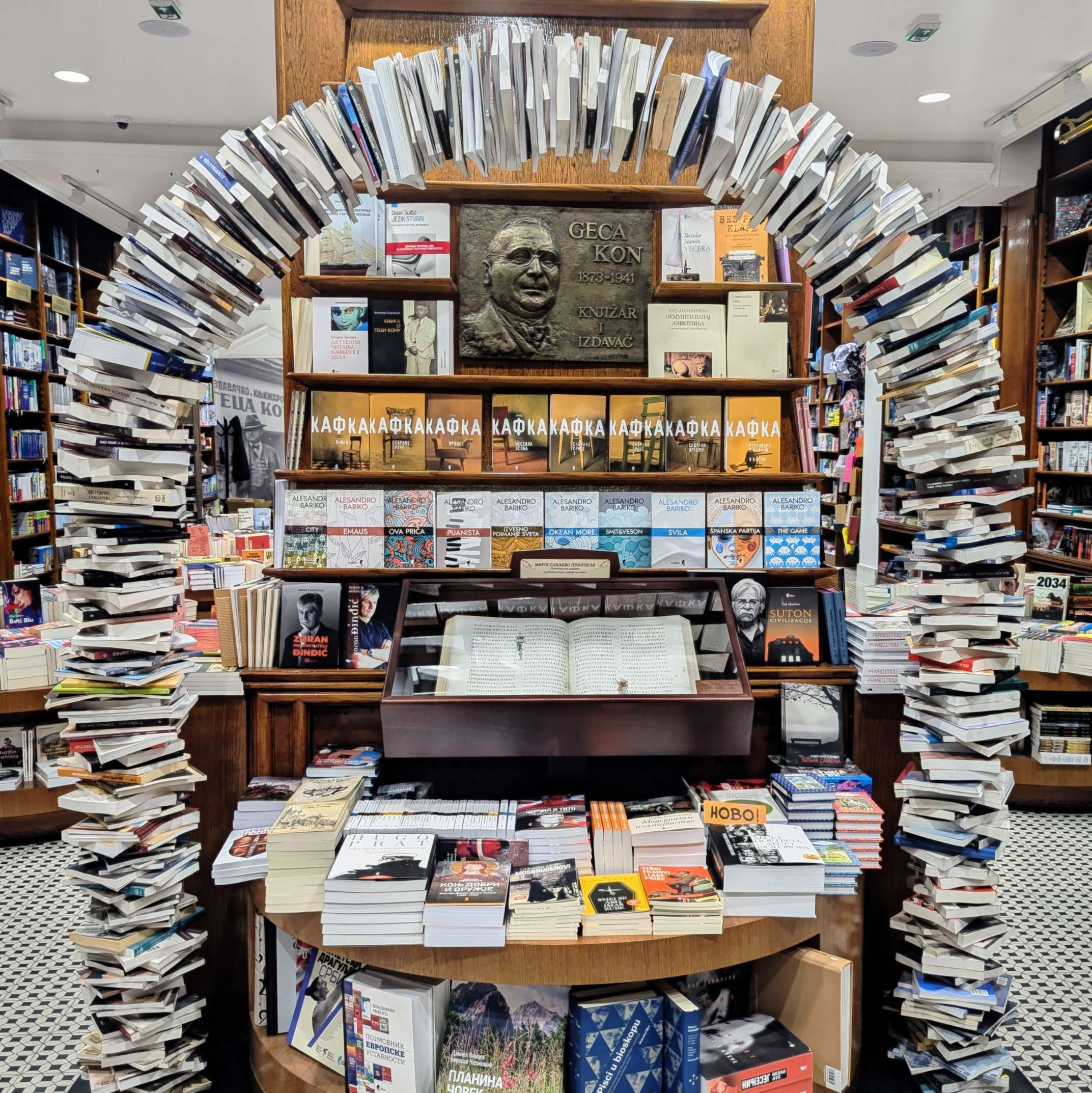
Geca Kon Bookstore interior in 2021 with the 1993 memorial plaque visible

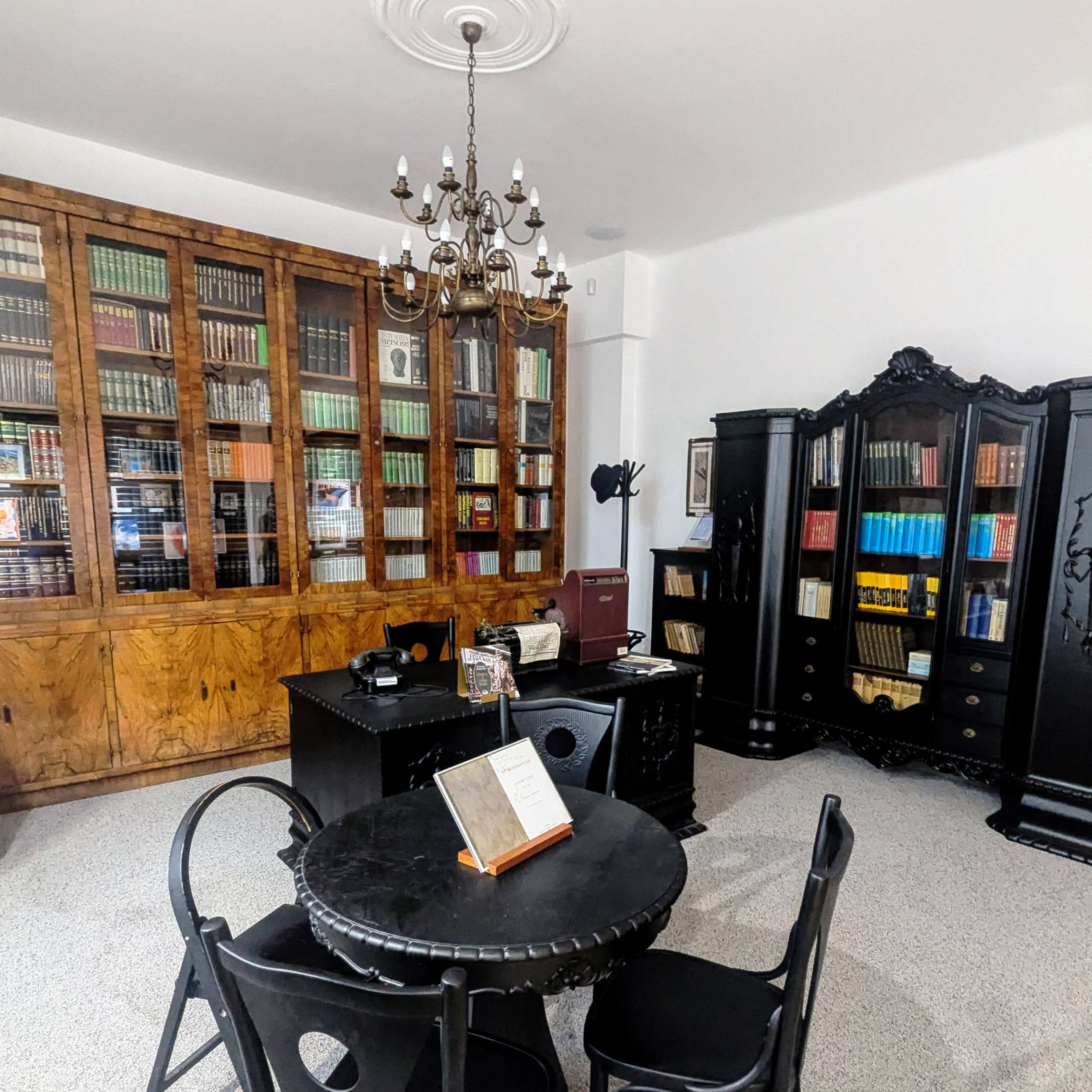
Geca Kon Bookstore, upper floor memorial space
