= Hyde Park, Belgrade =

Park in Belgrade, Serbia

Hyde Park
- Хајд парк
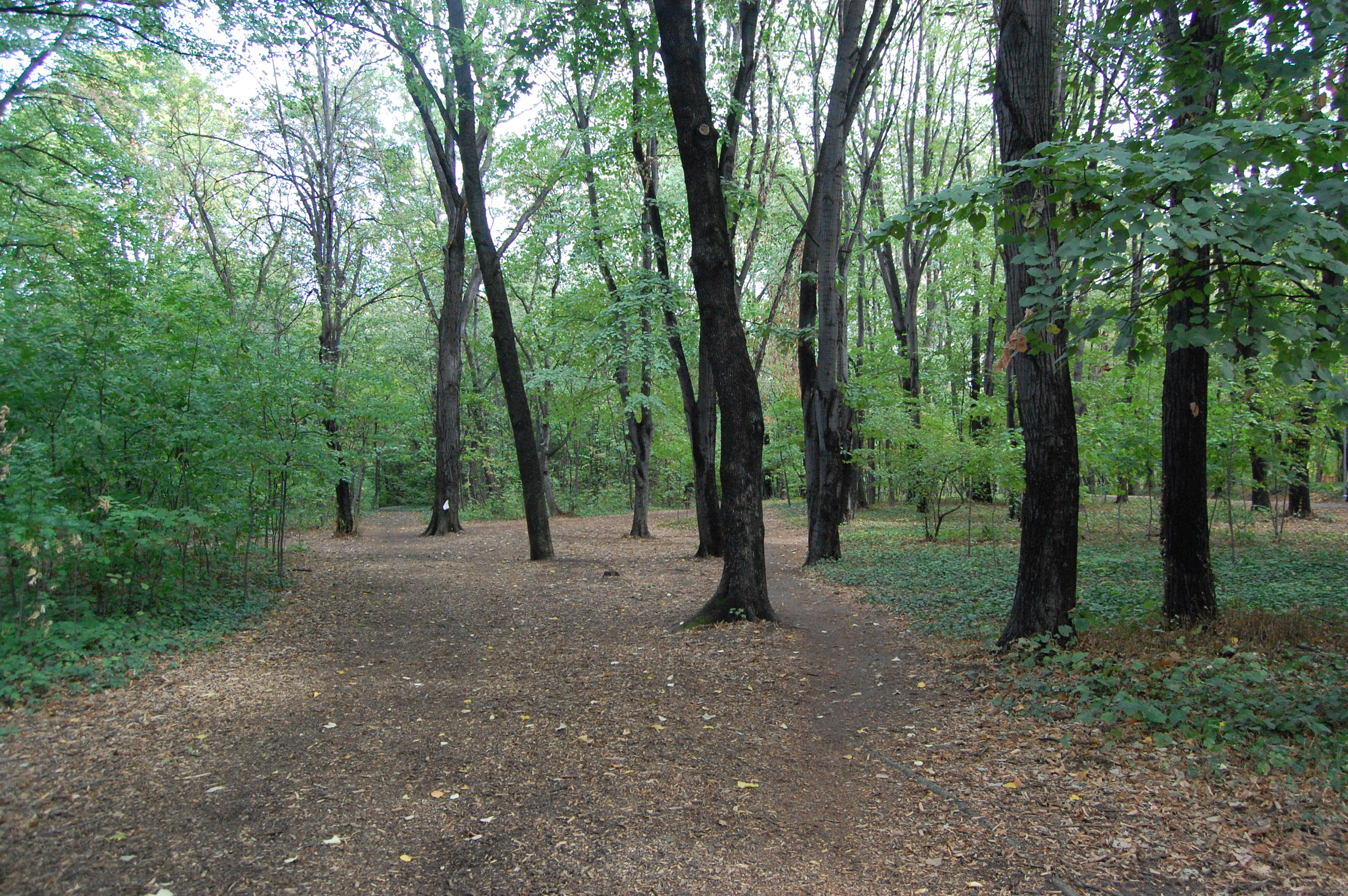
- Hyde Park, Belgrade

- Location within Belgrade
- Type: Urban park
- Location: Savski Venac, Belgrade, Serbia
- Coordinates: 44°47′30″N 20°26′55″E
- Area: 8.28 ha (20.5 acres)
- Created: ~ 1930s
- Operator: Zelenilo Beograd
- Open: Open all year

Hyde Park (Serbian: Хајд парк / Hajd park) is a park in suburban Belgrade, Serbia. It is situated in the municipality of Savski Venac, on the northern slopes of Topčider Hill. It consists of two parts: woodland with tracks for running, and another with appliances for fitness and recreation. The park is triangular in shape. Hyde Park was laid out in the 1930s.

Though called park, it is officially classified as an urban forest. It covers an area of 8.28 ha (20.5 acres).

Nearby are Partizan Stadium, House of Flowers and Prokop station.

== See also ==
- Topčider
