= Protected Spatial Cultural-Historical Units (Serbia) =

Protected Spatial Cultural-Historical Units (Serbian: Просторне културно-историjске целине/Prostorne kulturno-istorijske celine) are the monuments in the Republic of Serbia that have the third level of the State protection.

Those are part of the Cultural Property of Great Importance protection list.

| Picture | Name | Municipality/City | Place, Address | Year of inclusion | Info |
|---|---|---|---|---|---|
| | Pasha Mill Complex | Priština | Bariljevo | 1977 | |
| | Old Town Core | Peć | Peć | 1966 | |
| | Urban Unit Old Čaršija | Đakovica | Đakovica | 1954 | |
| | Urban Complex Potkaljaja, Pantelija, Potok Mahala | Prizren | Prizren | 1966 | |

== See also ==
- Cultural Property of Great Importance
- Serbian culture
