= Kadina River =

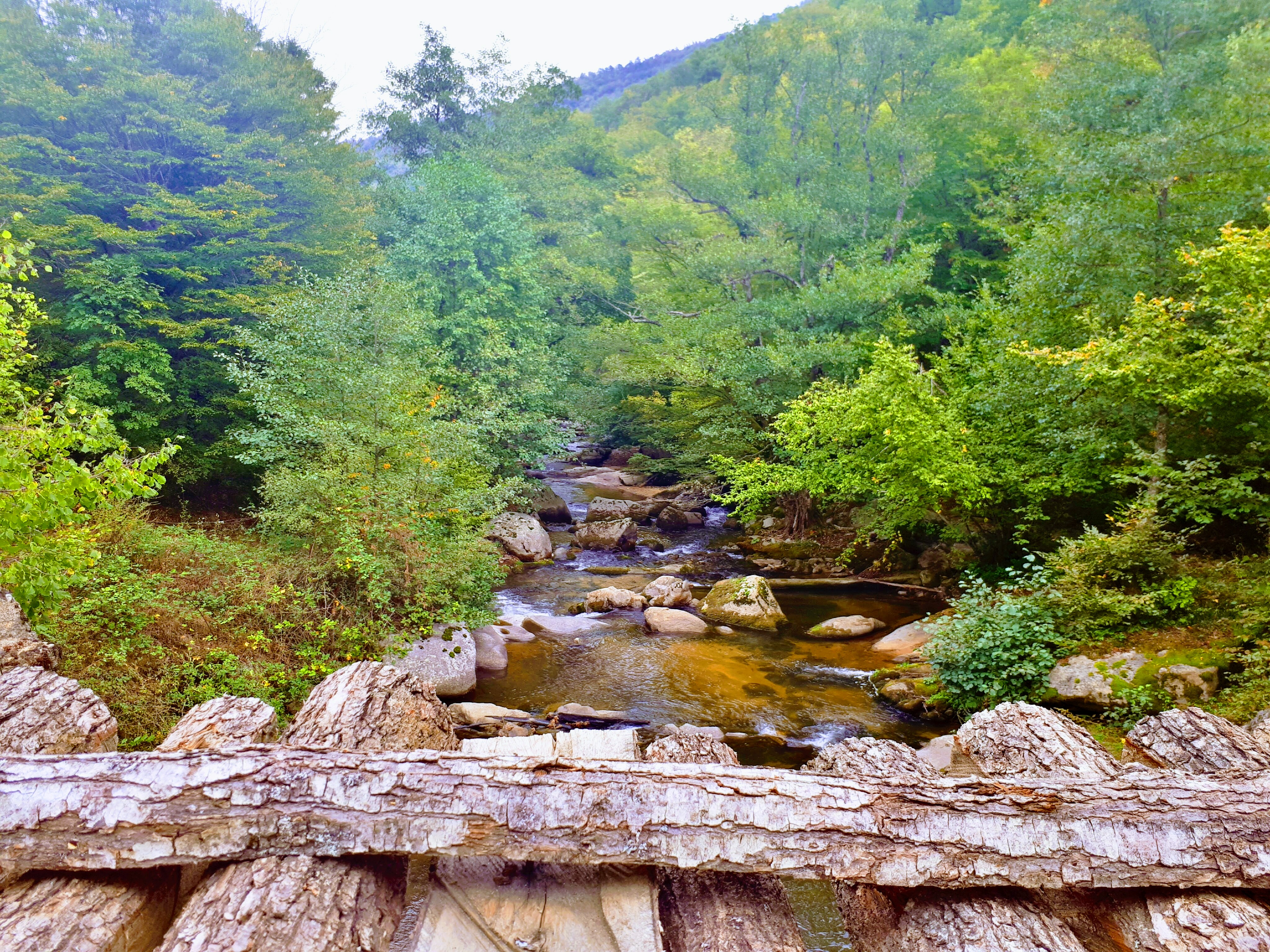
- View of the Kadina River near Tisovica, Zelenikovo
- Native name: Кадина Река (Macedonian); Lumi i Kadinës (Albanian)

Location
- Countries: North Macedonia

Physical characteristics
- Mouth
  - location: Vardar, near Smesnica
  - coordinates: 41.8447°N 21.6322°E
- Length: 34 km (21 mi)
- Basin size: 184 square kilometres (71 sq mi)

Basin features
- Progression: Vardar→ Aegean Sea

Kadina River (Macedonian: Кадина Река, Albanian: Lumi i Kadinës) is a mountain river in the Republic of North Macedonia and right-side tributary of the Vardar. It is 34 kilometres (21 mi) long and drains an area of 184 square kilometres (71 sq mi). Its source is at 41.7591°N 21.3770°E in Studeničani Municipality several kilometres upstream from Aldinci village. Thence it flows generally eastwards between the Golešnica and Kitka mountains within the Jakupica mountain ranges southeast of the city of Skopje and northwest of the city of Veles. The river empties into the Vardar near Smesnica.

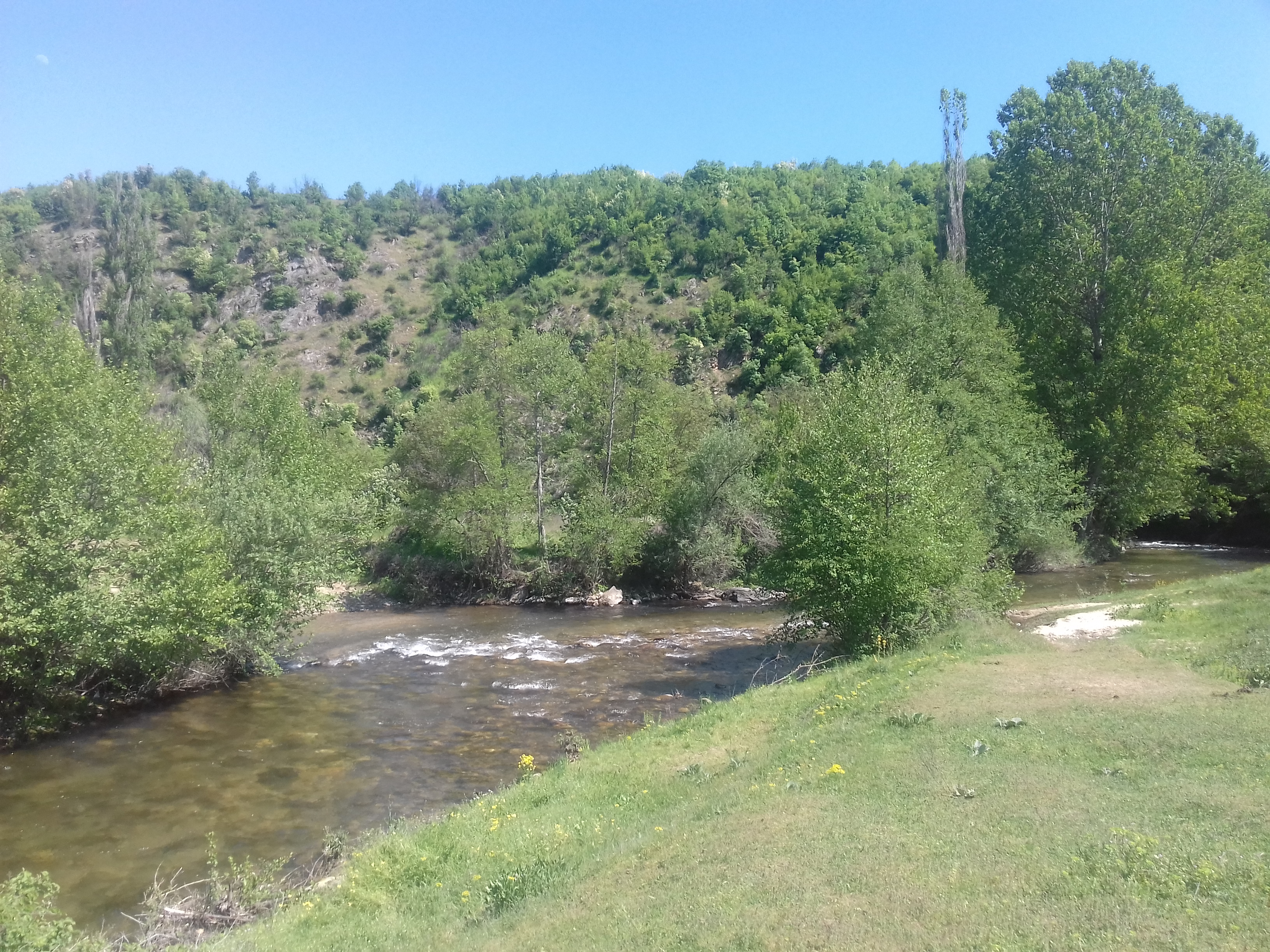
Kadina River near its confluence with the Vardar at Smesnica

== See also ==
- Geography of North Macedonia
