= Tisovica =

Tisovica may refer to:

- Tisovica, Zelenikovo, North Macedonia
- Tisovica (Nova Varoš), Serbia
