= Blokovski =

- Blokovski performing in Pančevo, 2012

Background information
- Also known as: Spirit Blokovski • Kajblo Spirit • Mire Kitić
- Born: Stefan Lav; May 3, 1982 (age 44)
- Origin: Belgrade, SR Serbia, SFR Yugoslavia
- Genres: Hip-hop, underground hip hop
- Occupations: Rapper, songwriter, record producer
- Label: Carski Rez
- Website: https://www.carskirez.com/

Blokovski (born May 3, 1982), (aka Spirit Blokovski and Kajblo Spirit), is a Serbian underground hip hop artist, lyricist, and music executive. He is also known as a co-founder of the influential hip hop group Arhitekti and the co-owner of the independent label Carski Rez. Over his multi-decade career, he has established himself as one of the most prolific figures in the Serbian underground rap scene.

== Early life and name origins ==
Blokovski was born and raised in Belgrade, Serbia. He began recording his first amateur demo tracks in 1996. His primary pseudonym, Blokovski is derived from the urban "blocks" (Blokovi) of New Belgrade, an area whose specific architecture, social climate, and youth culture heavily inspired his lyrical identity and visual aesthetic.

== Musical career ==
In 2005, he released the album "Čekanje je mučno" featuring 25 tracks, with guest appearances by Ministar Lingvista, Trag, Mjan, Ekspert, Edadikk, Krang, Valar, T-Blazer & Effective, Baron, and his colleagues from the group Arhitekti. The song "Sociofobija", recorded in collaboration with Croatian MC Valar, attracted the most audience attention.

In 2006, he released the album "Oproštaj od lošeg snimka", which featured the song "Rep limunada". This track became highly popular and spent weeks at number one on the UG top list of the show Opasne frekvencije on Radio SKC. That same year, 2007, he performed solo, as a member of Arhitekti, and with the supergroup NBG Unit at the Exit Festival, a Beogradski Sindikat concert, Novobeogradsko Leto festival, and many others.

In 2007, he released a self-titled EP with the group Arhitekti, and the song "Mrzim" caught the attention of the wider public. In mid-2007, he released the album "Oblici od oblaka deo 1.", which was well received by the hip-hop audience, earning him the award for Best Demo Album of the Year from the hip-hop web portal radivizija.com. Meanwhile, he held a large number of concerts throughout the former SFR Yugoslavia.

At the end of May 2008, he released the album "Oblici od oblaka deo 2." and received the Demo Album of the Year award for the second consecutive year, while the single "Ha-ha" was voted Demo Single of the Year. In the meantime, Carski Rez, in cooperation with Škabo's record label Magmedia, dropped their first official release titled "Rez. 1", while Blokovski began collaborating with rapper Supreme on a joint album.

The collaborative album "Samo lagano" was released in 2009 following performances in Belgrade, Banja Luka, and Podgorica. That same year, in collaboration with Banja Luka producer DJ Dust, he released the single "Moj druže", which came out in November 2009 under the Carski Rez and Bottom Vibes labels. It was declared the Best EP of the Year.

He was the creator and host of the "Rodin rep" and "Samo lagano radio show", radio shows which was focused on Serbian hip-hop music.

In February 2010, in collaboration with the Zagreb-based record label Sinestet and Carski Rez, he released the "Hologram remiks EP", featuring his songs produced by AC3PO. In mid-October 2010, he put out the single release "Ko sam ja", which included the title track that later appeared on the album Prototip, as well as a remix of the song by Belgian producer Panzer Kunst. The release also included instrumentals, recorded at the CRZ studio, with the mix, master, and original beat done by Kuer.

On the fifth anniversary of Carski Rez, May 11, 2011, he released the album "Prototip", which contained eighteen tracks. Guest MCs included Valar and Scrbr, while Kuer and Blokovski handled the album's mixing. The beatmakers on the album were Kuer, Skubi, HighDuke, Roycter, DJ Dust, Ace, Smiley, and Coa. Zrno Kafe played the guitar, and Coa (Citizen X) also contributed guitar parts. Alongside the album, he released the mixtape "Dete sa loptom uvek nađe društvo za igru", featuring twenty-two tracks, various guest appearances, and unreleased recordings.

Two and a half years after the release of the album "Samo lagano", Blokovski collaborated with Supreme once again, and on May 1, 2012, they released the album "Zumbul i Zvekan" through the Carski Rez record label. The album consisted of eight tracks, including an intro and an outro, with guest appearances by DJ Grusm on scratches and Kruks from Bauk Squad. Alongside Carski Rez producers Kuer and Skubi, Ace and Astek also worked on the album. The album promotion took place at Belgrade, Novi Sad and Pančevo.

In June 2012, he launched the project "Reci šta imaš" feat. Grupa građana. Over forty musicians submitted their work, and seventeen of them were featured on the track "Reci šta imaš", which was released on August 25, 2012.

At the end of 2012, he released the EP "Ništa naročito", which featured five tracks. Beatmakers Coa, Ace, and Astek participated in the EP, while Vincent played guitar parts on two of the songs. In July 2013, he released the single "Suvozač". "Majk Ček" was released in March 2016. In May 2018, he released the single "S reči na dela", recorded at the CRZ studio, with the mix and master handled by Mislav Petek.

In 2024, he released the album Dan mrmota (Groundhog Day), featuring songs published in the preceding period, such as "Suvozač", "Nevreme na Ibici" and "Pobednik". The album's production lineup included Kuer, DJ Silent, OLR, Coa, and Peta.

During 2025, he begins collaborating with producer Zicabitz, marking the start of a new drumless era. Several solo tracks and collaborations with MCs such as Ukov, Kila33, and Mlata shape their sound, positioning them as leaders and pioneers of mescaline rap on the Serbian scene.

In March 2026, the single release "Danka" announces the project "Last Dance", as well as the continuation of the "Oblici od oblaka" saga.

== Discography ==
=== Solo albums and EPs ===
- Čekanje je mučno (2005)
- Oproštaj od lošeg snimka (2006)
- Oblici od oblaka deo 1. (2007)
- Oblici od oblaka deo 2. (2008)
- Prototip (2011)
- Dete sa loptom uvek nađe društvo za igru (2011)
- Ništa naročito (2012)
- Dan mrmota (2024)

=== Collaborative albums and EPs ===
- Arhitekti EP (with Arhitekti) (2007)
- Samo lagano (with Supreme) (2009)
- Hologram RMX EP (with AC3PO) (2010)
- Zumbul i Zvekan (with Supreme) (2012)

=== Singles ===
- Rep limunada (2006)
- Ha Ha (2008)
- Moj druže (2009)
- Ko sam ja (2010)
- Radio (2011)
- Reci šta imaš (2012)
- Suvozač (2013)
- Patreon (2023)
- Danka (2026)
- Rajske ptice (2026)

=== Guest appearances ===
- Street Team - Balkan beasts vol. 1 (2005), song Za ortake
- MothaphonkinMjan - Ritam, Priča, Bas, Fank (2006), song 123
- Krang - Misterija (2006), song Inkvizitori
- Stihoven Kalibar - In medias res (2007), song Probaj zamisli
- T-Blazer i Nerve - Teme za razmišljanje (2007), song Ispod tvoje haljine
- Rapsod - Moja stvar (2008), song Svijet ѕa moje zidove
- Psiho Mistik - Mistična psiha (2008), song Jedna životinja u nizu
- DJ Dust - Iz prašine (2009), song Kasno je za ljubav; Dobro jutro
- 3man - Špijuni i čudovišta (2009), song Pijan pospan
- Tibor i Dupleks - Iza ramena (2009), song Sam na svijetu
- Skubi - Bonus trake (2009), song Ručak
- Cantvait i Freeman - Seks i nasilje vol. 1 (2010), song Tortilja
- DJ Kobazz i Skubi - SKUBAZZ (2010), song Za deset godina, Obmana
- DEC - DeKipa 2005-2010 (2010), song Prosto jebe, Sa bine za masu
- Skubi - Ae (2010), song Vatromet
- Bdat Džutim - Lost tapes (2011), song Od Teža do Kajbla
- Stihoven Kalibar - Poslednji zavet (2011), song Našite denovi
- Sinovatz - Kučkin sin (2011), song Dok uživam u blantu
- Ill G - Godine u priči (2011), song Vrtlog; Vreme mi stoji
- Panzer Kunst - Dazzle Camouflage (2011), song Radio
- Skubi - Baos (2011), song Alarm
- Kum Majk - Demo i kolabo stvari (2012), song U Rezu sajfer
- Lirik - Umetnik (2012), song Svetla u daljini; Veza
- Skubi - Sinee! (2013), song Tri plus
- Mateo i Professah - Skretanje za Oz (2013), song Imam razlog
- Tuhhtš - Klasika za zvučnik (2015), song Savršenstvo
- Skubi - Torimas (2016), song Paolo Maldini
- Ask - Desktop.rar (2021), song Po faci
- Tibor i VLBR - Rast Cijena (2023), song Ulje na vodi
