= Orešani =

Orešani Орешани
- Village
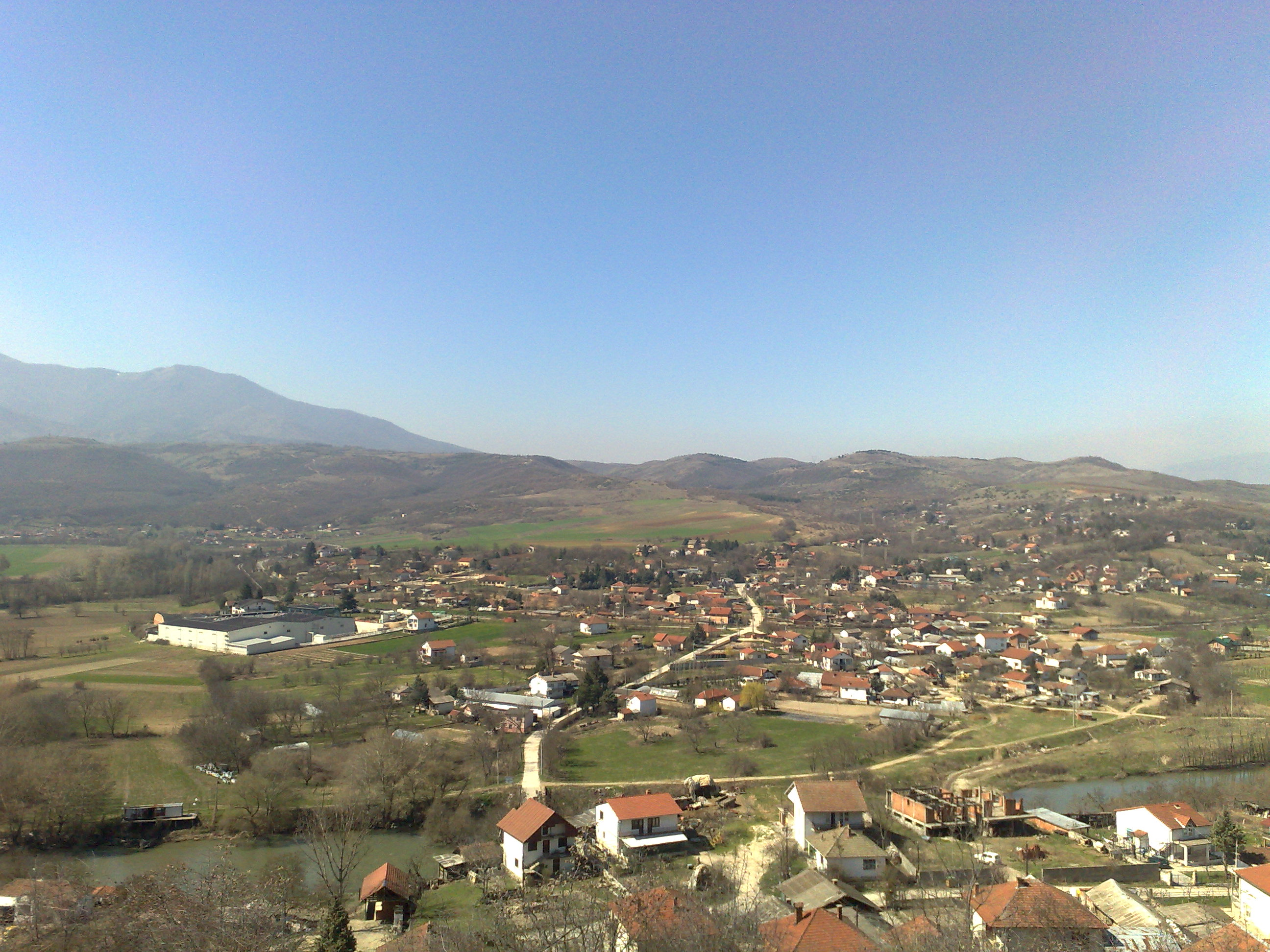

- Location within North Macedonia
- Coordinates: 41°54′N 21°36′E
- Country: North Macedonia
- Region: Skopje
- Municipality: Zelenikovo

Population (2021)
  - Total: 640
- Time zone: UTC+1 (CET)
  - Summer (DST): UTC+2 (CEST)
- Car plates: SK
- Website: .

Orešani (Macedonian: Орешани) is a village in the municipality of Zelenikovo, North Macedonia. Orešani's distance is 1.93 km (1.2 mi) away from the center of the municipality.

== Demographics ==
As of the 2021 census, Orešani had 640 residents with the following ethnic composition:

- Macedonians 474
- Albanians 96
- Macedonians (Persons )for whom data are taken from administrative sources 42
- Macedonian Serbs 15
- Macedonian Others 8
- Macedonian Bosniaks 5

According to the 2002 census, the village had a total of 515 inhabitants. Ethnic groups in the village include:

- Macedonians 387
- Albanians 103
- Macedonian Serbs 12
- Macedonian Romani 4
- Macedonian Turks 1
- Macedonian Others 8
