= Dejkovec =

Dejkovec Дејковец Dikavec
- Village
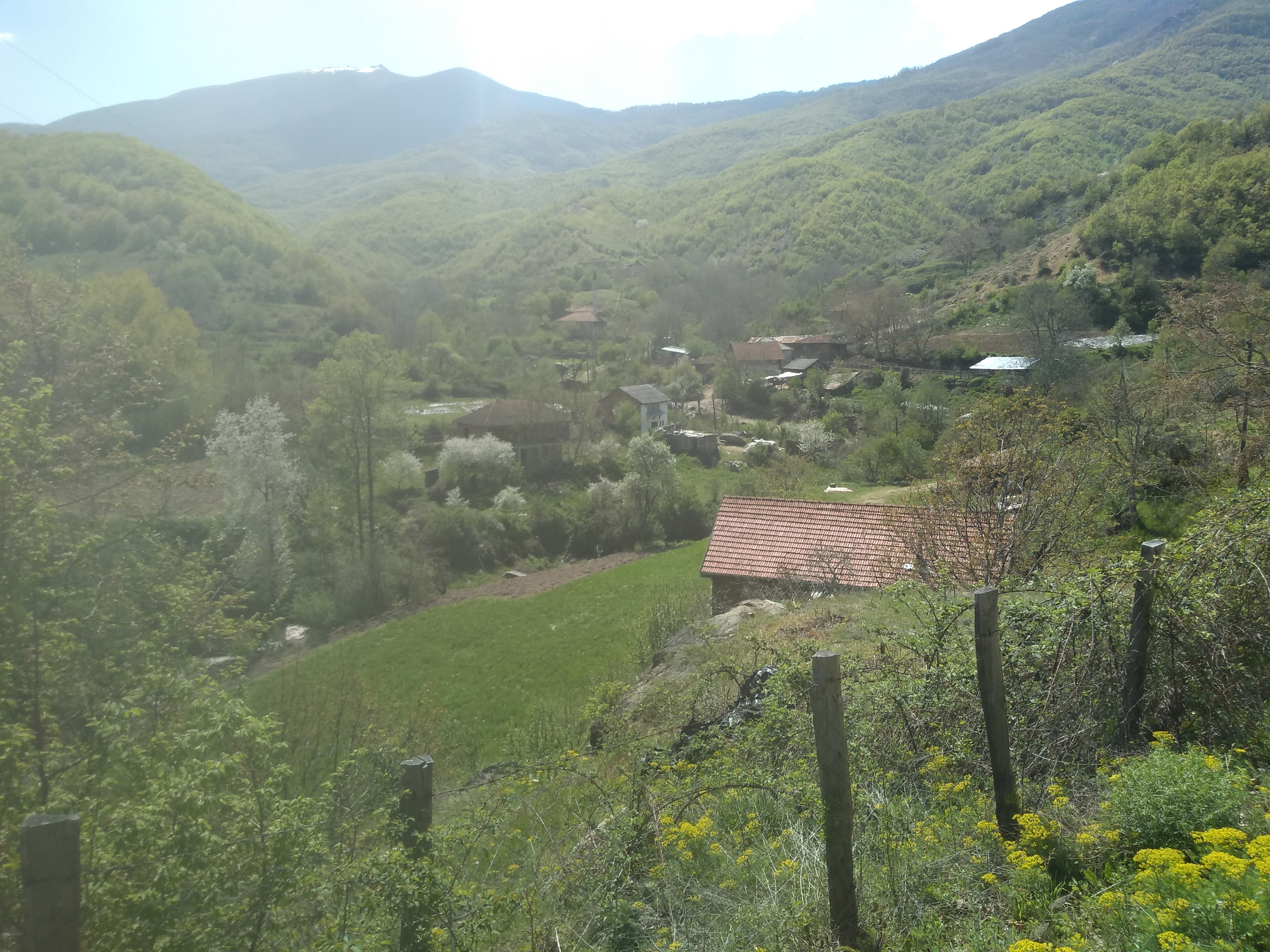

- Location within North Macedonia
- Coordinates: 41°48′N 21°34′E
- Country: North Macedonia
- Region: Skopje
- Municipality: Zelenikovo

Population (2021)
  - Total: 8
- Time zone: UTC+1 (CET)
  - Summer (DST): UTC+2 (CEST)
- Car plates: SK
- Website: .

Dejkovec (Macedonian: Дејковец, Albanian: Dikavec) is a village in the municipality of Zelenikovo, North Macedonia.

== Demographics ==
As of the 2021 census, Dejkovec had 8 residents with the following ethnic composition:

- Persons for whom data are taken from administrative sources 8

According to the 2002 census, the village had a total of 84 inhabitants. Ethnic groups in the village include:

- Albanians 84
