= Strahojadica =

Strahojadica Страхојадица Strugodicë
- Village
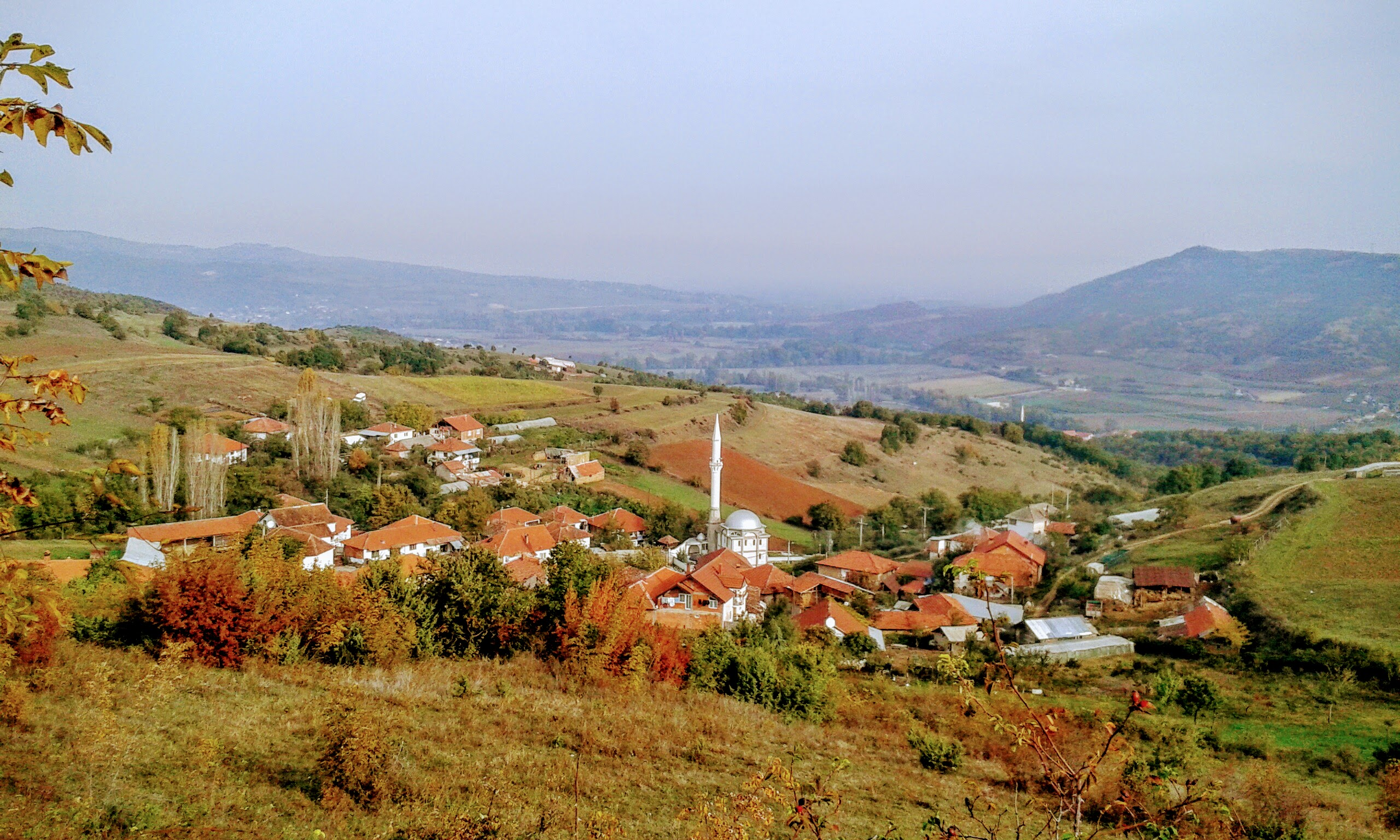

- Location within North Macedonia
- Coordinates: 41°52′N 21°36′E
- Country: North Macedonia
- Region: Skopje
- Municipality: Zelenikovo

Population (2021)
  - Total: 735
- Time zone: UTC+1 (CET)
  - Summer (DST): UTC+2 (CEST)
- Car plates: SK
- Website: .

Strahojadica (Macedonian: Страхојадица, Albanian: Strugodicë) is a village in the municipality of Zelenikovo, North Macedonia.

== Demographics ==
As of the 2021 census, Strahojadica had 735 residents with the following ethnic composition:

- Macedonians 281
- Albanians 225
- Bosniaks 182
- Persons for whom data are taken from administrative sources 43
- Others 4

According to the 2002 census, the village had a total of 268 inhabitants. Ethnic groups in the village include:

- Albanians 267
- Macedonians 1
