= Banovo Brdo =

Banovo Brdo Баново брдо
- Urban neighbourhood
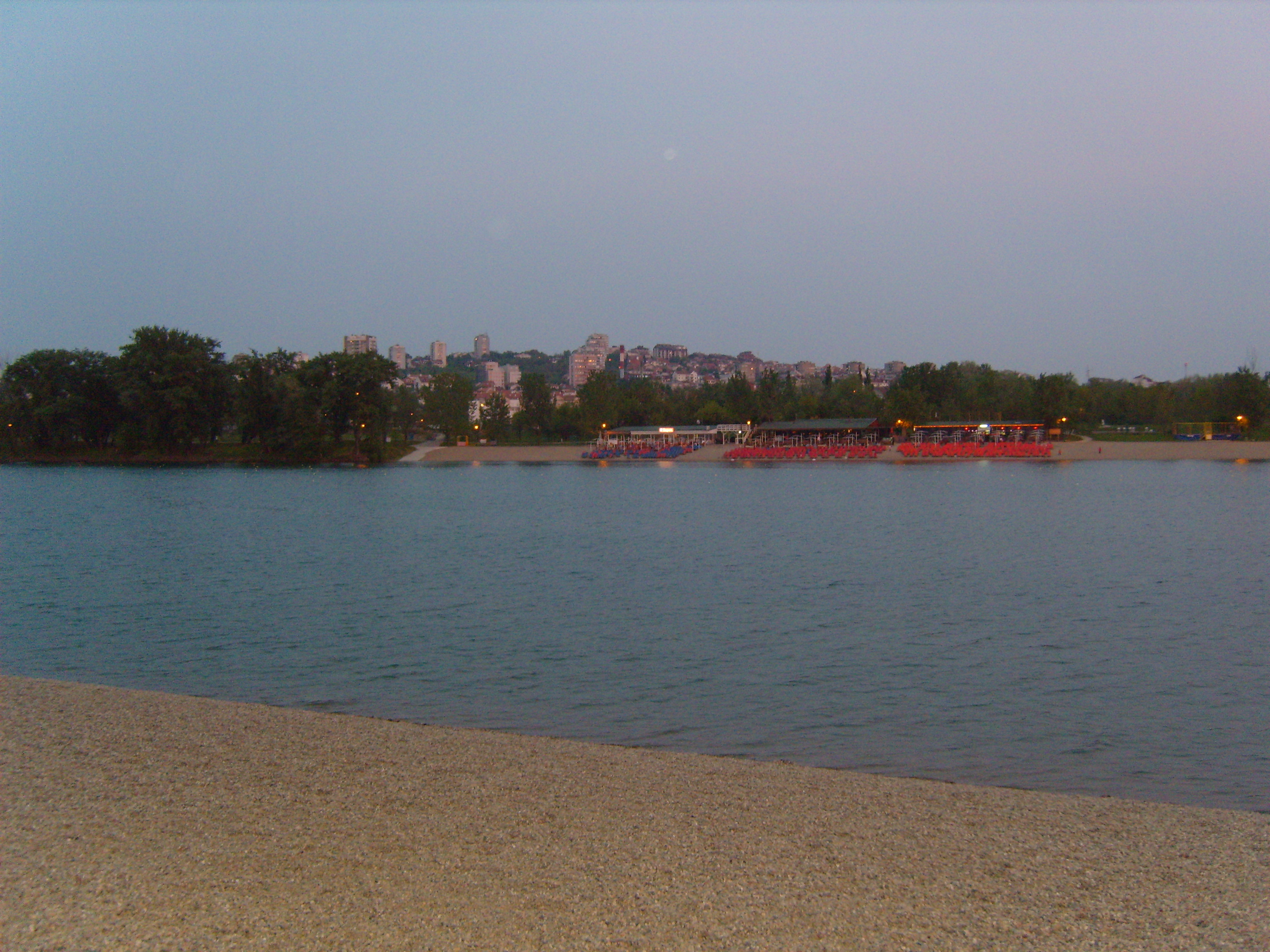
- View of Banovo Brdo from Ada Ciganlija.

- Location within Belgrade
- Coordinates: 44.779510°N 20.416106°E
- Country: Serbia
- Region: Belgrade
- Municipality: Čukarica
- Established: 1850

Area
  - Total: 5.63 km^{2} (2.17 sq mi)
- Elevation: 217 m (712 ft)

Population (2011)
  - Total: 35,373
  - Density: 6,280/km^{2} (16,300/sq mi)
- Time zone: UTC+1 (CET)
  - Summer (DST): UTC+2 (CEST)
- Postal code: 11030
- Area code: +381(0)11
- Car plates: BG

Banovo Brdo (Serbian Cyrillic: Баново брдо, pronounced [bǎːnɔ̝v̞ɔ̝ː br̩̂dɔ̝]) is a neighbourhood of Belgrade, Serbia. It is located in Belgrade's municipality of Čukarica.

== Location ==
Banovo Brdo is bounded by the neighborhoods of Čukarica and Čukarička Padina in the west, Ada Ciganlija and Careva Ćuprija in the north, Topčider and Košutnjak in the east and Žarkovo and Julino Brdo in the south. Eastern parts of Banovo Brdo make two sub-neighborhoods, Golf Naselje and Sunčana Padina. Banovo Brdo is 7 km (4.3 mi) away from downtown Belgrade and stretches along both sides of the major traffic and commercial route in this part of the city, the Požeška Street.

== History ==
In the mid-2010s, members of the Urban Development Center, who explore and document the Belgrade's underground, discovered an ancient lagum, underground corridor in the Radnička street. It was dug under the foothills of Banovo Brdo, in the slope of the white stone. The lagum is large, with spacious, hand chiseled hallways. After it was abandoned at some point, the entrance was covered with rubble and later completely forgotten. As of 2017 it still hasn't been properly explored so it is unknown from which period it originates. There are also a derelict underground railway tunnel and a German bunker from the World War II. The tunnel passes right under the center of the neighborhood while the bunkers are located close to the Čukarički Stadium.

The area was previously called Golo brdo (“Naked hill”) or Ordija. Dubrovnik-born author and diplomat, Matija Ban (1818–1903), who often traversed the hill, asked from the Belgrade municipality to sell a patch of land to him. For the recognition of his work for the state, the municipality of Žarkovo, which at that time encompassed the area, granted him a lot in 1850, which was located somewhere on top of the modern Kneza Višeslava Street. He built a summer house in the traditional Šumadija-style, with a large porch (doksat) and separate wooden pantry-house (vajat). The complex which Ban developed included a dairy, other auxiliary buildings, vineyard, orchard and a lush flower garden. It was sort of a botanical garden, as Ban planted plants he collected on his travels (Dubrovnik, Greek islands, Far East) while Belgrade florists were donating him plants they would acquire abroad.

The estate became one of the cultural centers of Belgrade. The most frequent visitors were painters, including Stevan Todorović, who married Ban's daughter Poleksija. Poleksija Todorović became one of the first women painters in Serbia. Ban moved permanently to Belgrade in 1861, and even though he owned a mansion in downtown Belgrade (24 Gospodska Street; today Brankova), he and his Greek-born wife Margarita spent the last years of their lives on the estate.

After his surname, he named his estate Banovac. Soon, other wealthy Belgraders began to settle around his estate, planting grapes and orchards and soon named the whole neighborhood that developed on the hill Banovo Brdo (Ban's Hill). Poet and diplomat Jovan Dučić built a house close to Banovac. Today, it is not known where the estate was exactly located as Austro-Hungarian army shelled it and burned it to the ground in 1914, during the bombing of Belgrade in World War I. Additionally, there are no photos or paintings of the complex but some descriptions in written works survived. In the 21st century, Čukarica municipal awards were named "Matija Ban", and a monument dedicated to Ban was unveiled on 12 May 2022. Work of Ranko Đanković, it was placed on the plateau in front of the municipal building.

After World War II, before the skiing facilities were built on the mountains further from Belgrade, the slopes of Banovo Brdo (so as of Kalemegdan, Košutnjak and Avala), were used by Belgraders for skiing.

== Characteristics ==
Banovo Brdo generally stretches along the Požeška street, the main street connecting the central parts of the Belgrade with the southwestern boroughs and suburbs (most notably, Žarkovo, Labudovo Brdo, Petlovo Brdo, etc.) and itself is the initial part of the Požeška street-Trgovačka street direction which continues into the Ibarska magistrala (Highway of Ibar), one of the major roads in western Serbia.

After the first sugar refinery in Serbia was opened in Čukarica in 1901, on the northern slopes of the hill, majority of original workers came from Germany. As they were mostly Roman Catholics, after the campaign by the Lazarists from Slovenia, the Church of the Saints Cyril and Methodius was built in 1929. A Serbian Orthodox Church of Saint George followed in 1932.

There are three elementary/middle schools, Josif Pančić, Banović Strahinja and Filip Kljajic-Fića, as well as school for kids with special needs, Milojе Pavlović. There are also two high schools, XIII Belgrade Gymnasium and High School of Chemistry, and two public colleges, Faculty of Forestry, and Faculty of Sport and Physical Education, University of Belgrade.

Since the 1980s, the Požeška street became one of the busiest streets in the city, gradually developing into one of the most prosperous trading and commercial parts of Belgrade. The uniqueness of Banovo Brdo lies in the fact that it functions as a city within a city, with its own walking zone, park and commercial area.

Banovo Brdo Park covers 8.41 hectares (20.8 acres). Northern extension of the park, Park of 88 Trees, between the streets of Steve Todorović and Petra Martinovića streets, covers additional 0.67 hectares (1.7 acres).

The thorough reconstruction of the central Požeška street started in the summer of 2009. Until it was finished in the beginning of 2010, the massive change in the traffic and the public transportation routes caused many problems for the citizens. After the works were done it was obvious that the quality of the job was not satisfactory. Even the city government protested to the "Svitelski" company which conducted the reconstruction.

== Features ==
=== Arboretum ===
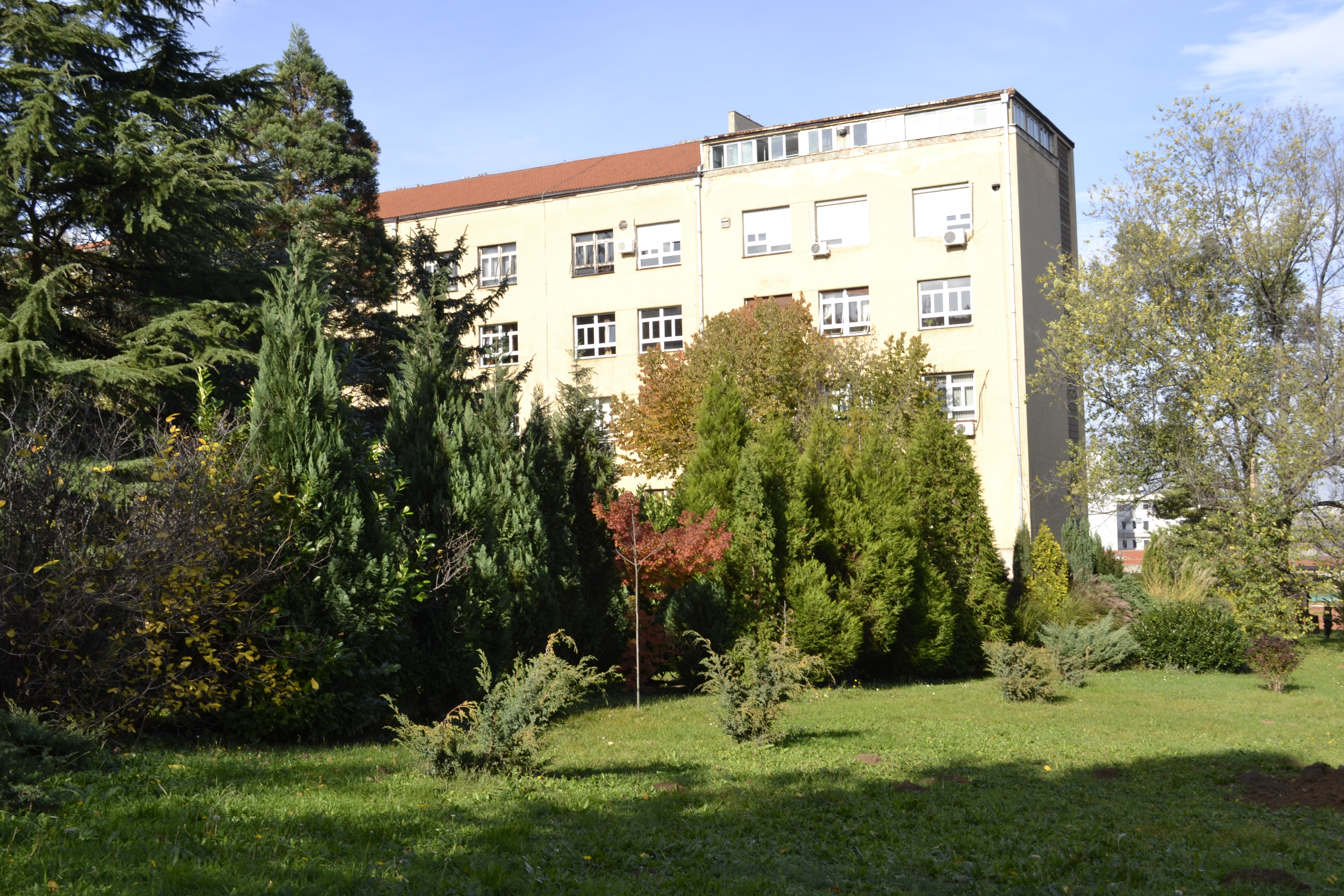
Conifer section of the arboretum

New building of the Faculty of forestry was built in 1956, right above Careva Ćuprija, where the northwest section of the vast wood of Košutnjak begins at an altitude of 110-125 meters. Professors and students began developing a dendrology collection in 1957, which grew into the Arboretum of the Faculty of Forestry, a specific botanical garden which was protected by the state in July 2011 as the natural monument. It is used as an classroom in the open, for the practical studies of the students but also by the scientist for their work. The arboretum has its nursery garden and the greenhouse. On 6.7 hectares, the arboretum holds 2,000 individual specimen of 300 trees and shrubs. They include 218 deciduous and 24 conifer species, out of which 80 are ornamental, and 40 species of the perennial plants. There are 77 domestic and 146 foreign species, including: narrow-leafed ash, Balkan maple, Balkan forsythia, laburnum, giant sequoia, cedar, cherry laurel (new variety developed in arboretum), Himalayan pine and the oldest metasequoia in Belgrade.

=== Cinema Šumadija ===
One of the symbols of the neighborhood is the "Šumadija" cinema, part of the complex of Čukarica Cultural Centre in Turgenjevljeva Street. The construction began in 1950 and with constant changes and additions, continued to 1959 when was finished. It was officially declared a Čukarica Cultural House on 28 February 1960. It contained cinema, library, theatre scene, concert hall, etc. Television Belgrade's first quiz show, hosted by Mića Orlović, was broadcast from here. The venue was considered to be one of the most modern in Yugoslavia at the time, patterned after the Soviet halls. It hosted shows, orchestral concerts, box matches, revues, musicals, etc. The cinema was fully renovated in 2001 and privatized, but the new owners closed it in 2003. The complex later returned to the municipal ownership and in 2017 the reconstruction began. By the December 2017 it should be reopened.

=== Military cemetery ===
After fierce fighting in the World War I, German occupation army conquered Belgrade in October 1915. German commander, Generalfeldmarschall August von Mackensen, ordered for the dead soldiers to be buried on the hill above Banovo Brdo. Amazed by the bravery of the Serbian soldiers who defended the city, Mackensen ordered for Serbian dead soldiers to be buried in the center of the cemetery: bodies of 36 Serbian soldiers from the 7th Infantry Regiment, one British and one French soldier were surrounded by the bodies of 2,600 German soldiers. This act surprised even Mackensen's subordinated officers. Above each grave there was a cross with information about the deceased, from their military papers. He also erected three monuments. Two were for the German soldiers while the third one, shaped like a simple stone block, says in Serbian and German: "Here rest Serbian heroes, 1915".

When German emperor Wilhelm II arrived in Belgrade in 1916, a large stone bench was built for him by the German soldiers. So as the monument, it was made from the marble which Belgrade municipality purchased in 1911 and which was planned for the reconstruction of the central city square Terazije and the Terazije fountain. The bench was placed on the point on the hill from which the emperor could see the entire Belgrade below.

By the 21st century, the cemetery deteriorated a lot. One monument to the German soldiers is in bad shape and it is believed that the Serbian soldiers were transferred to the joint ossuary for the World War I soldiers in the Belgrade New Cemetery. The other German monument is today within the yard of a privately owned school, while Belgrade is no more visible from the spot as the Košutnjak forest expanded and completely engulfed the area. The only remaining visible mark of the cemetery itself is part of the fence.

=== Julino Brdo footbridge ===
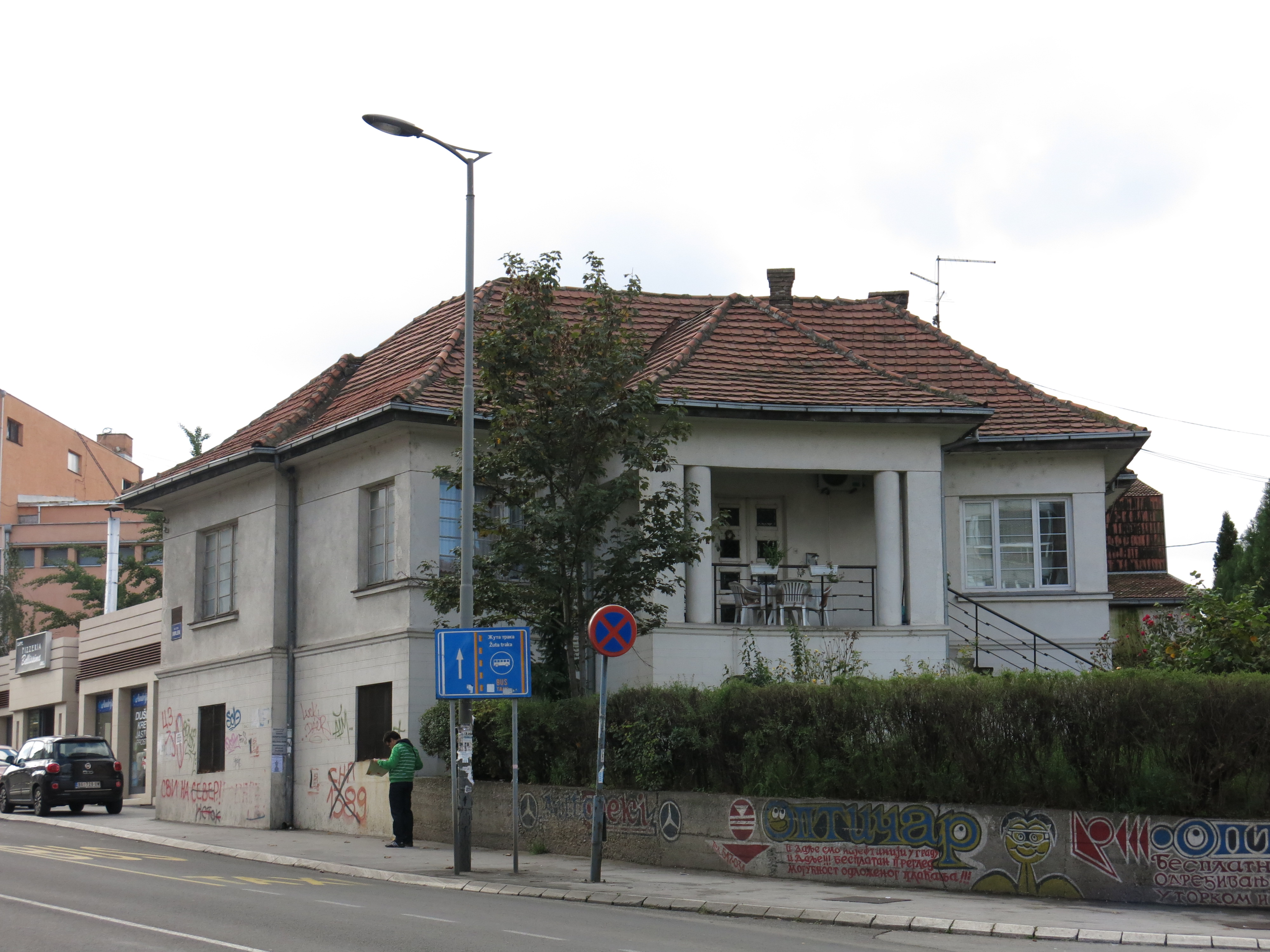
House at 1 Turgenjevljeva Street

In 1999, construction of the pedestrian bridge, which was to directly connect Julino Brdo to Banovo Brdo's major public transportation terminus, began. It spans the busy Maršala Tolbuhina Street, or the urban section of the Ibar Highway, and was built as part of the complex which was to include two buildings, and a plateau from which the bridge extends. The investor, "Stankom" company, went bankrupt and, though the majority of works were finished, they were never completed and everything was left to the elements. Without any maintenance, the bridge deteriorated in time, but the residents are still using it. In June 2019, city officially announced completion of the works, starting in August, but "Stankom's" creditors rejected the offered deal. By April 2022, the gapes opened on the bridge, and the entire derelict complex was described as the set of a horror movie.

=== Protection ===
As of 2018, there were two protected objects in central Banovo Brdo. The House at 1 Turgenjev Street, built in 1935, has been declared a cultural monument. Originally built as a family house of medical doctor Radomir Ćirković, since 1936 it became a gathering place for the members of the Communist Party of Yugoslavia.

The tree of European yew in the yard of the Saint Sava kindergarten at 28 Požeška Street, was declared a natural monument.

== Population ==
Historical population
Year	Pop.	±%
1981	32,167	—
1991	34,025	+5.8%
2002	37,491	+10.2%
2011	35,373	−5.6%

Prior to the 2011 census of population, the neighborhood was divided in five local communities (mesna zajednica; sub-municipal administrative unit): Banovo Brdo, Proleter, Blagoje Parović, Milan Tomić Sare and Mihajlovac. After 2011, there are two: Branovo Brdo (with annexed Proleter) and Mihajlovac (including merger with Blagoje Parović and Milan Tomić Sare). Total population of the neighborhood in 2011 was 35,373. Population of the local communities by censuses:

Local community	Original name	1981	1991	2002	2011
Banovo Brdo	Баново брдо	5,802	4,781	5,887	13,668
Proleter	Пролетер	4,432	7,005	7,068	merged into Banovo Brdo
Mihajlovac	Михајловац	10,906	10,206	9,952	21,705
Blagoje Parović	Благоје Паровић	6,616	7,623	9,447	merged into Mihajlovac
Milan Tomić Sare	Милан Томић Саре	4,411	4,410	5,137	merged into Mihajlovac

== Sub-neighborhoods ==
=== Proleter ===
A neighborhood developed by 1970 along the right side of the Požeška Street. The neighborhood had its own local community up to the 2002 census, when it was merged into the local community of Banovo Brdo.

== Future ==
In September 2018 the plan for the reconstruction of the central area of the neighborhood was announced. The project covers a total of 19 ha (47 acres). A pedestrian zone will be formed from the streets of Kozačinskog and Ščerbinova, and the small squares at elementary school Josif Pančič and the newly reconstructed Beteks shopping center. Multi-level garage (two under the ground, three above) will be built on the central Šumadija Square. Neglected "Čukarica" cultural center will be revitalized and will host a library, daily club for the elderly, etc. The small plateau in front of the center will be transformed into the green area. Residential block between the Lješka and Turgenjevljeva streets which consists of 8 one-floor buildings called the "pavilions", will be demolished and five-storey buildings will be built instead. Higher buildings will be also allowed in the wider section, which is an individual residential area today, with houses and yards.

City responded that they wish to expand the narrow streets, but that neither the privately owned parcels will be shortened nor that any of the objects will be demolished. The citizens, however, protested against the plan, accusing city government of working with the private investor who wants to build a large object of undetermined purpose.
