= Vražale =

Vražale Вражале Vrazhallë
- Village
- Location within North Macedonia
- Coordinates: 41°53′N 21°33′E
- Country: North Macedonia
- Region: Skopje
- Municipality: Zelenikovo

Population (2021)
  - Total: 26
- Time zone: UTC+1 (CET)
  - Summer (DST): UTC+2 (CEST)
- Car plates: SK
- Website: .

Vražale (Macedonian: Вражале, Albanian: Vrazhallë) is a village in the municipality of Zelenikovo, North Macedonia.

== Demographics ==
As of the 2021 census, Vražale had 26 residents with the following ethnic composition:

- Albanians 23
- Persons for whom data are taken from administrative sources 2
- Turks 1

According to the 2002 census, the village had a total of 102 inhabitants. Ethnic groups in the village include:

- Albanians 101
- Others 1
