= Viktor Jevtović =

Serbian politician (born 1983)

Viktor Jevtović (Serbian Cyrillic: Виктор Јевтовић; born 1983) is a politician in Serbia. He has served in the National Assembly of Serbia since 2020 as a member of the Serbian Progressive Party.

== Private career ==
Jevtović was born in Belgrade, in what was then the Socialist Republic of Serbia in the Socialist Federal Republic of Yugoslavia. He is a master manager and works at the Poštanska štedionica.

== Politician ==
Prior to his election to the national assembly, Jevtović was active with the Progressive Party's organization in Banovo Brdo in the Belgrade municipality of Čukarica.

He received the 153rd position on the Progressive Party's Aleksandar Vučić — For Our Children list in the 2020 Serbian parliamentary election and was elected when the list won a landslide majority with 188 out of 250 mandates. He is now a member of the European integration committee; a deputy member of the committee on human and minority rights and gender equality; a deputy member of the committee on finance, state budget, and control of public spending; a deputy member of the committee on administrative, budgetary, and immunity issues; a deputy member of Serbia's delegation to the Parliamentary Dimension of the Central European Initiative; the leader of Serbia's parliamentary friendship group with Guyana; and a member of the parliamentary friendship groups with Canada, Denmark, Germany, Indonesia, Israel, Italy, Japan, Kuwait, Montenegro, North Macedonia, Qatar, Russia, Spain, Sweden, Switzerland, the United Arab Emirates, the United Kingdom, and the United States of America.
