= Pakoševo =

Pakoševo Пакошево
- Village
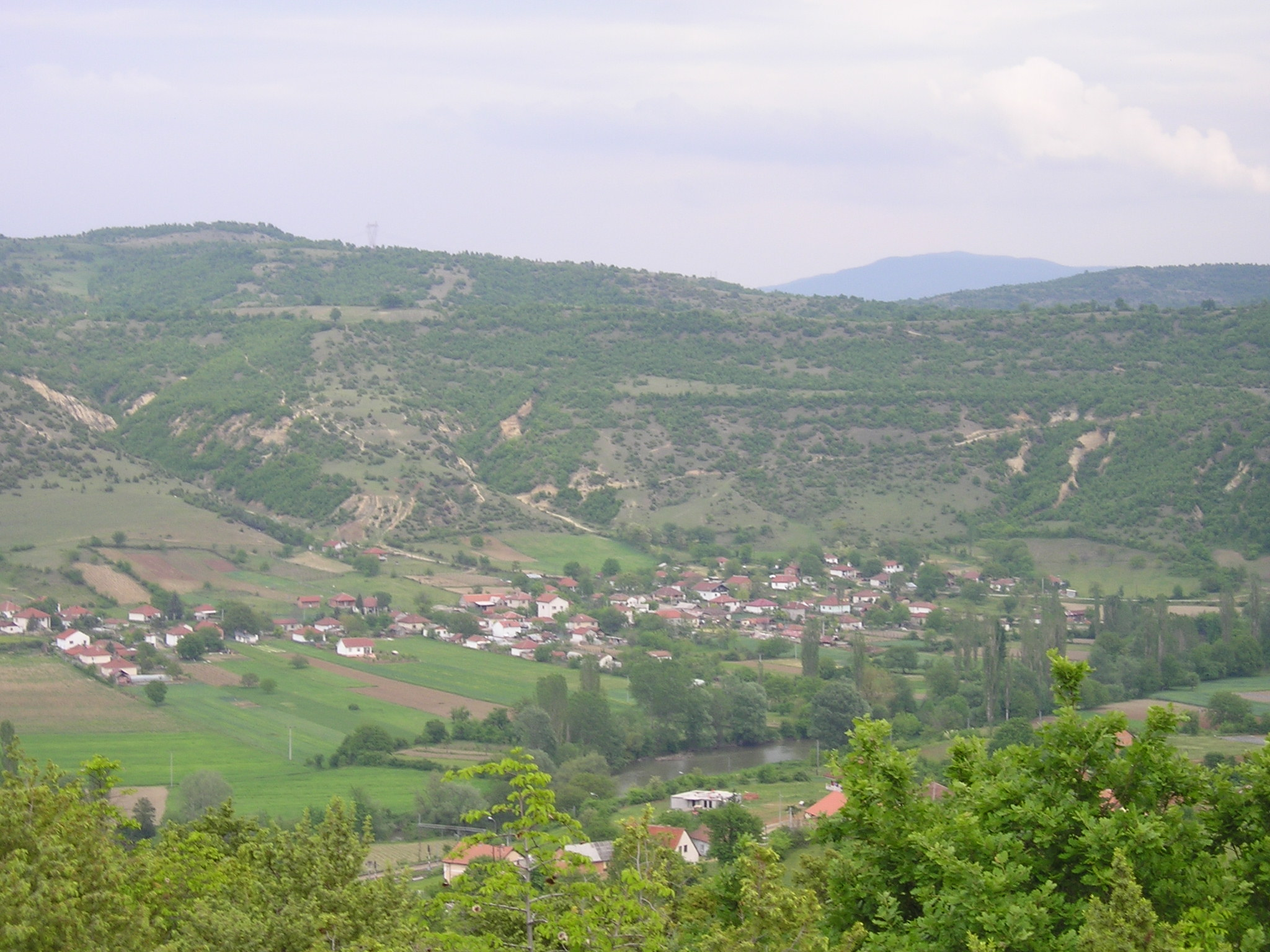

- Location within North Macedonia
- Coordinates: 41.873504°N 21.617369°E
- Country: North Macedonia
- Region: Skopje
- Municipality: Zelenikovo

Population (2021)
  - Total: 243
- Time zone: UTC+1 (CET)
  - Summer (DST): UTC+2 (CEST)
- Car plates: SK
- Website: .

Pakoševo (Macedonian: Пакошево is a village in the municipality of Zelenikovo, North Macedonia.

== Demographics ==
As of the 2021 census, Pakoševo had 243 residents with the following ethnic composition:

- Macedonians 210
- Persons for whom data are taken from administrative sources 14
- Roma 14
- Others 5

According to the 2002 census, the village had a total of 247 inhabitants. Ethnic groups in the village include:

- Macedonians 210
- Serbs 10
- Romani 27
