= Gumalevo =

Gumalevo Гумалево Gumalevë
- Village
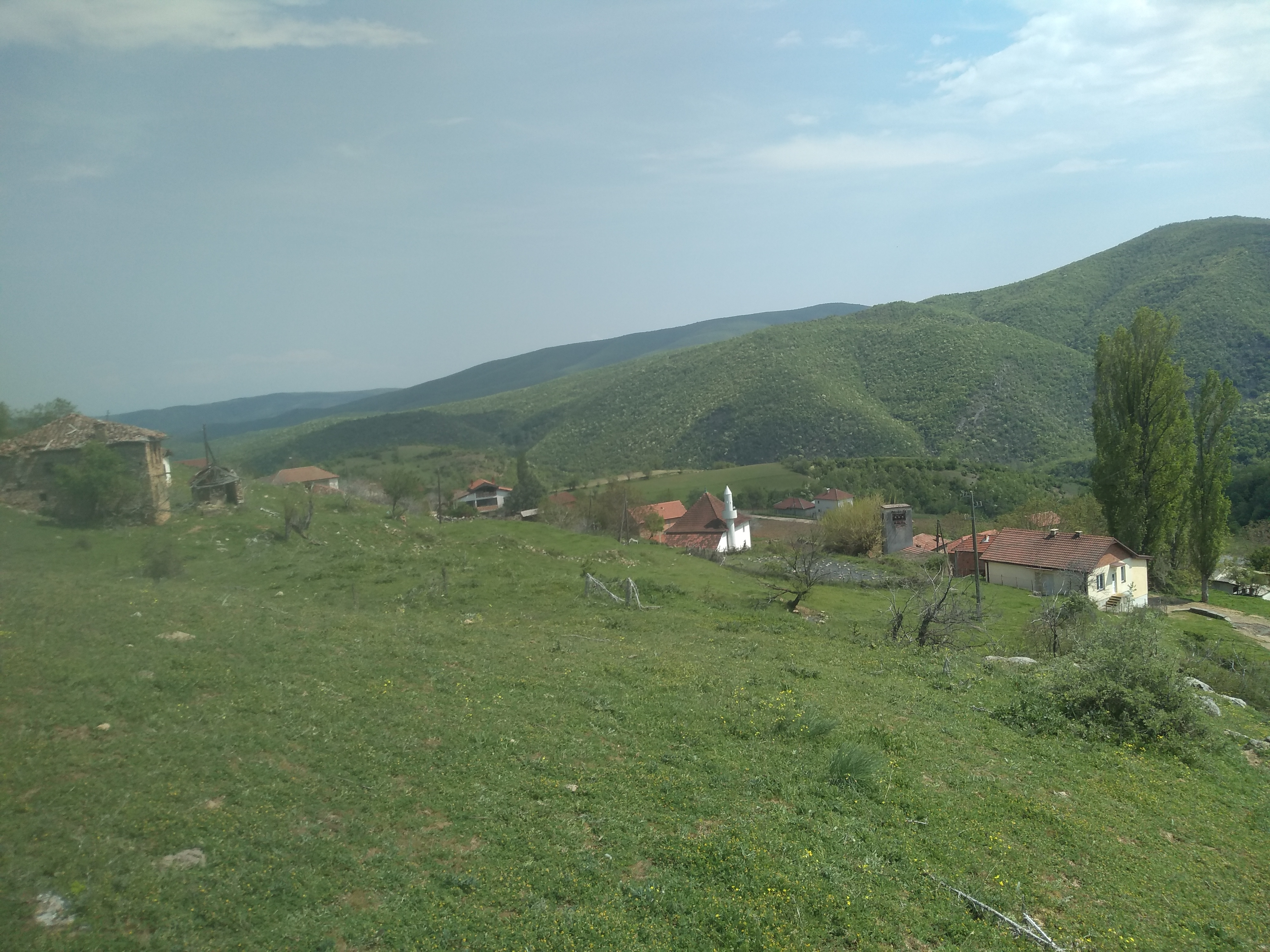

- Location within North Macedonia
- Coordinates: 41°50′N 21°36′E
- Country: North Macedonia
- Region: Skopje
- Municipality: Zelenikovo

Population (2021)
  - Total: 15
- Time zone: UTC+1 (CET)
  - Summer (DST): UTC+2 (CEST)
- Car plates: SK
- Website: .

Gumalevo (Macedonian: Гумалево, Albanian: Gumalevë) is a village in the municipality of Zelenikovo, North Macedonia.

== Name ==
The name is tautological, stemming from the Albanian and Persian words for mountain, mal and guh respectively.

== Demographics ==
According to the 1467-68 Ottoman defter, Gumalevo appears as being inhabited by an Orthodox Albanian population. Some families had a mixed Slav-Albanian anthroponomy - usually a Slavic first name and an Albanian last name or last names with Albanian patronyms and Slavic suffixes. The names are: Niko the son of Drala, Daba the son of Drala, Niko the son of Luna, Nikola the son of Gropsha, Pejo the son of Nikola, Nikola the brother of Kolojan, Daba the son of Drala, Rala son of Capo, Radoslav son of Prenko.

As of the 2021 census, Gumalevo had 15 residents with the following ethnic composition:

- Albanians 9
- Persons for whom data are taken from administrative sources 6

According to the 2002 census, the village had a total of 102 inhabitants. Ethnic groups in the village include:

- Albanians 102
