= 88 Trees for Comrade Tito =

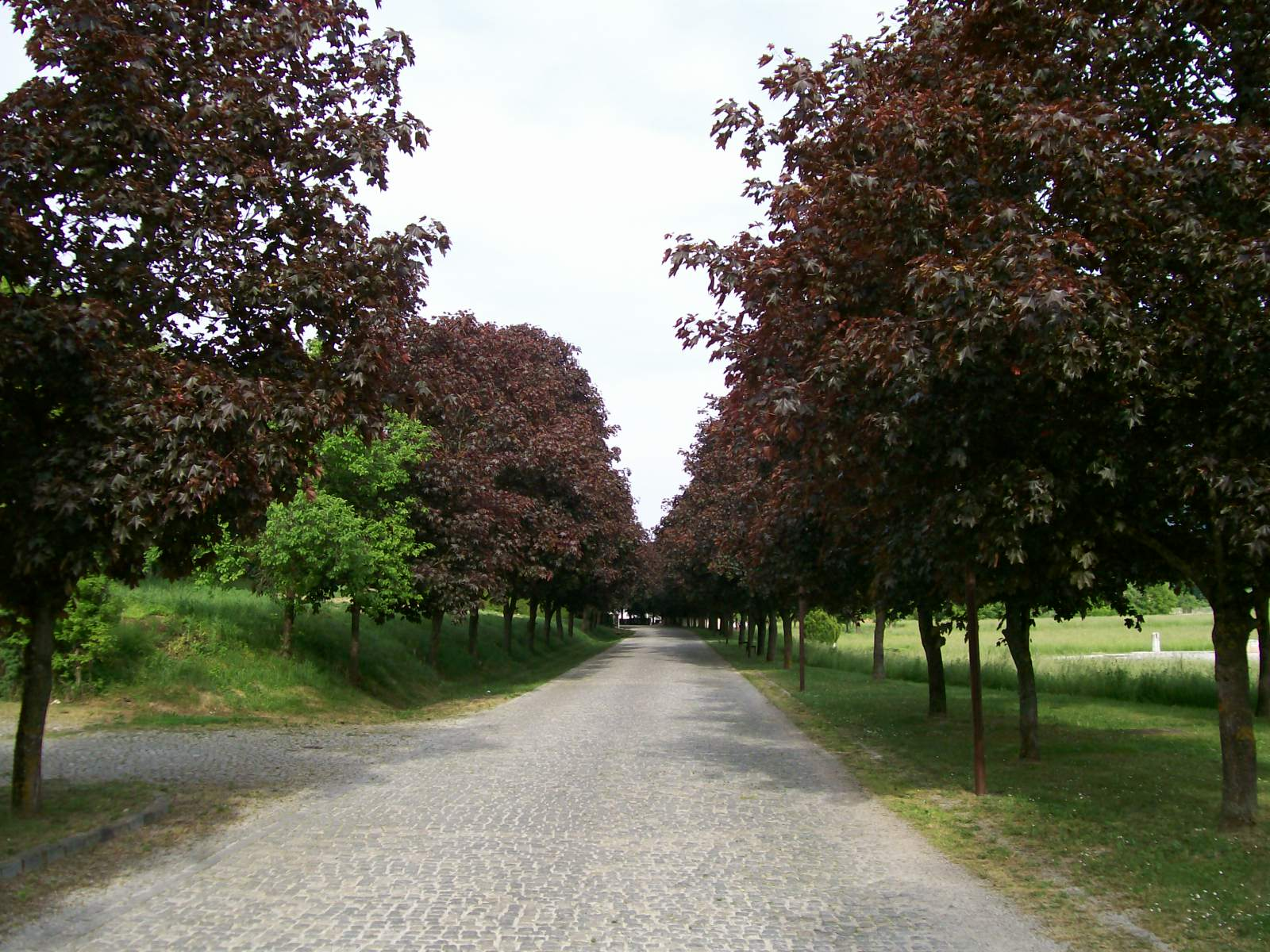
Alley of 88 red ashes in Kumrovec planted in May 1980

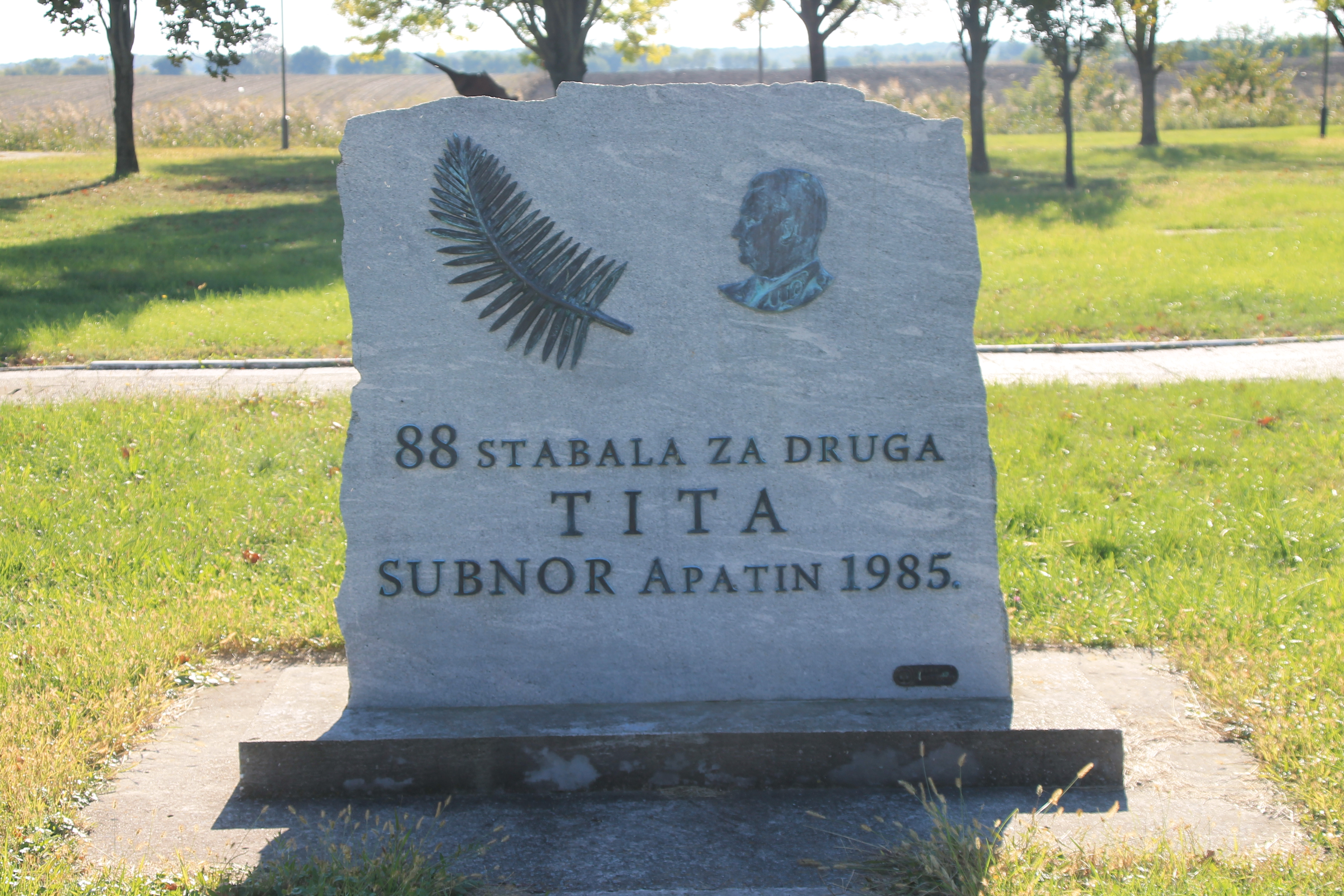
Plaque at the memorial alley in Banja Junaković near Apatin

88 Trees for Comrade Tito (Serbo-Croatian: 88 стабала за друга Тита, romanized: 88 stabala za druga Tita; Slovene: 88 dreves za tovariša Tita) was an initiative undertaken in many communities across Yugoslavia after the death of its long-time president Josip Broz Tito. Its goal was to create memorial alleys consisting of 88 trees, symbolizing the 88 years of Tito’s life. The initiative was officially launched on 1 April 1981, but planting of 88 trees had already started in some places soon after Tito's funeral. It was officially approved by the Socialist Alliance of Working People (SSRNJ) based on a proposal by the Yugoslav Council for the Protection and Improvement of the Human Environment, although they claimed the idea came "spontaneously" from many places.

More than one thousand memorial alleys, parks, woods or rose gardens were created all over the country until 1989 when the initiative was over. Many of these are still standing today.

== Beginnings ==
Josip Broz Tito died on 4 March 1980, after leading the country for some 35 years. Already in May 1980, it was announced that 88 trees will be planted in the new "Tito Grove" in Dobanovci. On 25 May, 88 red ashes were planted in Tito's home village of Kumrovec. According to the government sources, the idea of planting 88 trees came "spontaneously from many communities around Yugoslavia". On 5 June 1980, the Assembly of the Yugoslav Association for the Protection and Improvement of the Human Environment accepted proposal of the Croatian branch of the SSRNJ to make a nationwide initiative of planting 88 trees for late Tito. SSRNJ and its committee for commemorating Tito analyzed this idea and gave formal approval on 5 February 1981. It was decided that the initiative would be launched on 1 April and would last until the end of 1985. 1 April was chosen because it was the Day of the Youth work actions.

According to the official decision, this initiative had "ideological, educational and commemorative character." It was stipulated that 88 trees can be planted wherever there is enough space that is publicly owned. Also, several types of memorials were proposed: "Tito forest", "Tito grove", "Tito park", or "Tito alley", made up of 88 trees or "Tito rose garden" made up of 88 roses if there was no enough space for trees.

Even before the official launch of the initiative, 88 trees were planted in some communities. On 7 February 1981, 88 trees were planted in front of an elementary school in Šibenik. During February and March 1981, the planting was undertaken in Smederevo, Tuzla, Vinkovci, Zelenikovo, Trnje, Bihać, Titograd, Ulcinj, and in several local communities in Slovenia and Timok Valley. On 3 March, the Kosovo branch of the SSRNJ decided to plant 88 trees in every town and every local community in the province. In Pucarevo, 264 roses were planted (three times 88).

Decades later, in 2023, Večernje novosti reported that the idea of planting 88 trees for Tito came from Ljubomir Demšar, a local official from Vršac who proposed planting 88 trees in a park adjacent to what is now the Millennium Centar.

== Action ==
The initiative was officially launched on 1 April 1981. April saw planting of trees and roses is many towns and villages all over the country. Soon, the planting of 88 trees or roses became a staple of every commemoration connected to Tito. Trees were planted in parks, schools, factories and military barracks. On 21 May, the Association positively assessed the results of the initiative, although it criticized hastily and random planting of trees and planting on spaces that are not suitable for permanent commemoration. During the summer of 1981, the initiative took on massive proportions as thousands of trees were being planted all over the country every week. All participants in the initiative were given commemorative badges. Planting of trees for Tito became a kind of competition between the towns and communities. In November 1981, Yugoslavian construction workers in Iraq planted 88 palm trees for Tito.

The initiative was continued through 1982. Many trees were planted on 1 April and 4 May 1982. Already in 1982, it was noticed that many Tito parks and alleys were lacking adequate maintenance. In September 1983, unidentified persons uprooted 88 apple trees that were planted in Raušić near Peć. The officials blamed Albanian nationalists. Tree planting was continued in 1983, 1984 and 1985, albeit at a slower pace, as there was almost no village or town left without a Tito alley. In July 1984, an explosive device was detonated in the memorial park in Split where 88 trees were planted back in 1981. In November 1985, SSRNJ decided to extend the initiative after the end of 1985. In 1987, it was reported that many trees planted as part of the 88 Trees initiative have dried up due to lack of maintenance, but the initiative was still ongoing. The last tree planting actions were reported on 1 April 1989 in Istok and Đakovica.

== Results ==
Exact numbers are not known as nobody collected data, but it is estimated that some 300 new parks with 10 000 trees were planted in Belgrade only, while in Rijeka 88 000 trees were planted. More than one thousand memorial parks and alleys were planted in total. Many memorial alleys and parks planted during the initiative still stand today as a good example of urban greening. Yet, many others were destroyed due to negligence or urban development, or lost their memorial function.

In some places, the trees were planted in such way to spell the word TITO when seen from above. One such example is near the Military Medical Academy in Belgrade (44.76159°N 20.4698°E).

== See also ==
- Arbor Day
