= Sugar Refinery, Čukarica =

Former sugar refinery in Belgrade, Serbia

Coordinates: 44.786540°N 20.421548°E

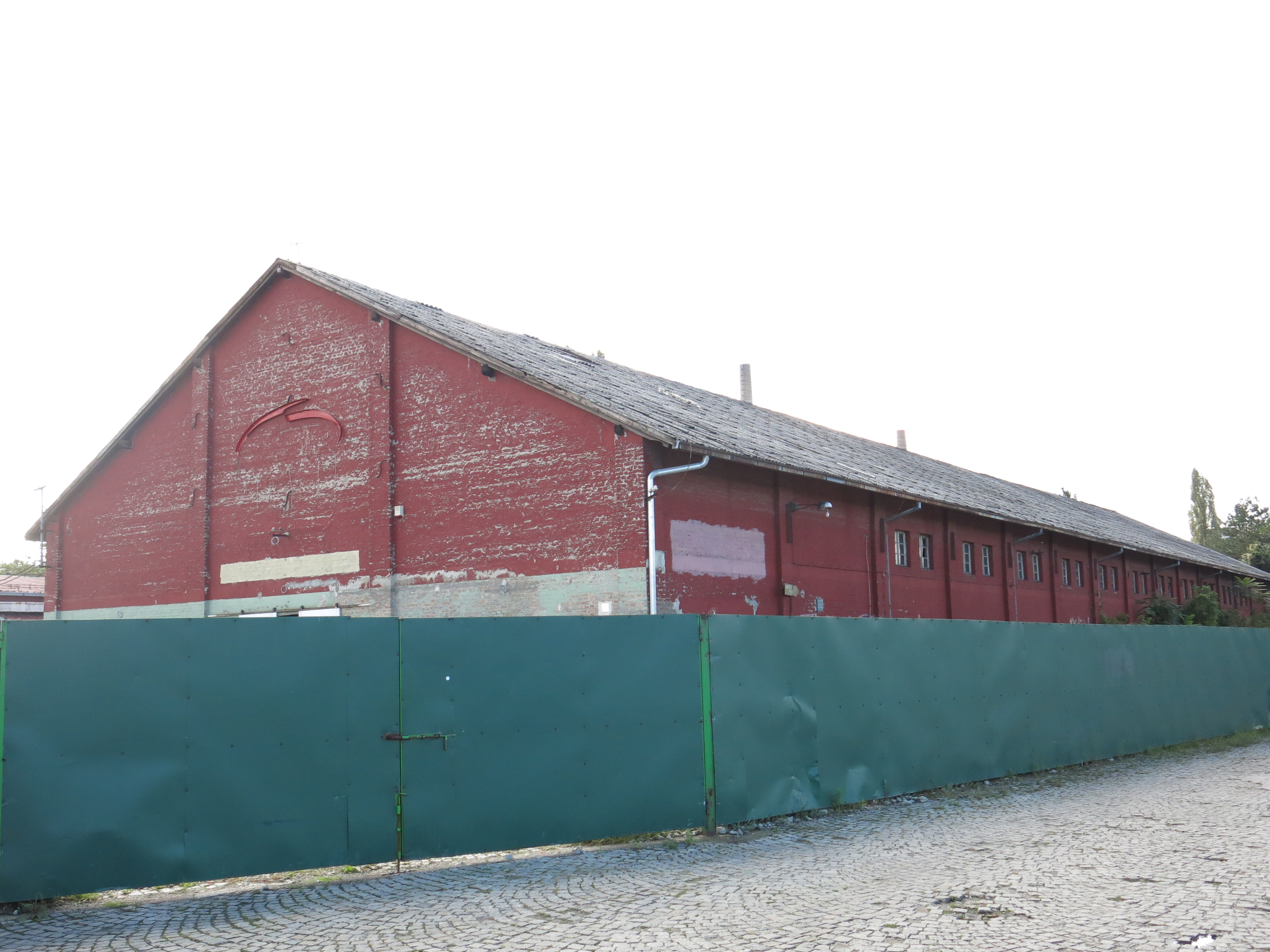
One of the factory buildings

Sugar Refinery in Čukarica or Old Sugar Factory (Serbian: Фабрика шећера на Чукарици / Стара шећерана, romanized: Fabrika šećera na Čukarici / Stara šećerana) is a defunct industrial complex in Belgrade, the capital of Serbia. Built in 1901, it was the first sugar factory in Serbia. In 1984 it was placed under protection as a cultural monument.

== Location ==
The factory complex is located at 3 and 3-a Radnička street, in the municipality of Čukarica. On the west, south and east it is encircled by the Paštrovićeva street, which on the east separates it from the Belgrade Hippodrome and the neighborhood of Careva Ćuprija. To the north, across the Radnička, is the Sava river's Bay of Čukarica and Belgrade's popular recreational zone, Ada Ciganlija. To the northwest it borders another industrial complex, the reservoirs of Jugopetrol.

== History ==
At the present location of the sugar factory, there was a kafana in the second half of the 19th century. It was very popular as it was located at the point where two roads, one from Obrenovac and other from Šumadija, meet at the entrance to Belgrade. It was owned by Stojko Čukar and after him the kafana was named “Čukareva kafana” which later gave name to the village of Čukarica, which developed into the urban neighborhood and a municipality of Belgrade.

King Alexander Obrenović instigated the Law on promotion of the domestic industry in 1898. Based on the law, the international tendering for the sugar factory was announced and companies from Belgium, United Kingdom, Austria-Hungary, Germany and even Japan applied. The grant was given to the German consortium "Royal Serbian privileged sugar factory in Belgrade, Hacke, Goldschmidt and Weinschenk". The consortium was formed by Alfred Hacke, an engineer from Magdeburg, Julius Goldschmidt, a banker and a consul from Lugshaven and Max Weinschenk, industrialist and the main shareholder of the large sugar refinery in Regensburg. The complex was built from 1899 to 1901, as the first sugar refinery in Serbia. The refinery had a machine room, drying room, quarters for the employees, administrative building and a house for the workers. The complex was later renovated and expanded several times with new objects.

Already in 1902 it was temporarily closed due to being unprofitable. During the First World War, the Sugar factory was heavily damaged. After the war, it was under the administration of the Ministry of Justice until 1925, when — thanks to its first director, Eng. Borivoje J. Jovanović — it became majority state-owned and received the name “State Sugar Factory in Čukarica.” Eng. Borivoje J. Jovanović (1895–1944), director of the State Sugar Factory in Čukarica, was also the founder and first technical manager of the Spirit and Yeast factory. He completed his studies in technology at the Sorbonne in Paris and his specialization in Prague. He became the first graduate technologist in that field and brought his knowledge to Belgrade, transferring and applying the most modern technologies of that time.

The Spirit and Yeast factory, within the Old Sugar Factory complex, was built shortly before the Second World War and put into operation in 1940. The most modern technology was applied from France, while the design concept, the foundations of the construction project, the mechanical project, and the delivery of equipment were provided by the Czech company Škoda.

It was damaged again, during the German bombing of Belgrade in April 1941, while German troops looted the remains during the 1944 retreat. After 1945, new Communist authorities nationalized the factory and renamed it the "First Serbian sugar factory Dimitrije Tucović 1898" in 1948, after the socialist Dimitrije Tucović. During its heyday, the factory employed 500 people in three shifts. In 1969, the factory became a part of PKB, Belgrade Agricultural Combinat.

As a part of the wider industrial complex of Čukarica, the refinery became one of the centres of trade union activities. It was the focal point of the workers who were members and agitators of the Serbian Social Democratic Party, founded by Tucović. The factory was especially known for the 1907 strike. The State Council ordered for both the army and the police to suppress the strike. The intervention was brutal and violent, 4 workers were killed and many were wounded. In 1952 a bust of Tucović was placed in the factory yard. The bust has vanished since then while the damaged pedestal still stands.

== Closing ==
In 1982 the production was transferred to the new sugar factory in Padinska Skela, surrounded by 80,000 hectares (200,000 acres) under sugar beet. The factory in Čukarica fully stopped refining sugar in 1983. The new complex worked until 1998, processing 6,000 tons of sugar beets daily. It has its own power plant on gas and furnace oil, electrical substation, lime kiln, reservoirs for the furnace oil and molasses, concrete pools, silos, warehouses, administrative building with a restaurant and has its own road and railway access.

The premises are vacant since 1983, except for the fermentation section which became operational. It is split into the separate company, "Vrenje". "Vrenje" covers an area of 2.5 ha (6.2 acres), while "Dimitrije Tucović" occupies the remaining 7.4 ha (18 acres) with 19,000 m^{2} (200,000 sq ft) of business area. The machines were partially moved to Padinska Skela and partially sold.

The bankruptcy proceedings for "Dimitrije Tucović" started in 2007. The state decided to sell the premises, but in the package with the factory in Padinska Skela (70 objects on 104 ha (260 acres)). From 2008 to 2011, five auctions were held and all failed cause there were no interested buyers. For the April 2011 auction, the value for both factories was estimated to 11.88 billion dinars or €118.8 million. Economists and estate agents gave several reasons for so many unsuccessful sales. While the old factory is on a very attractive location, Padinska Skela section, distant from the city, is not appealing. As the factory is protected, during any reconstruction the authentic appearance has to be preserved and nothing can be done on the complex without the permits from the institutes for protection. Commercial and residential objects are not allowed by the city urban plan, so the possibilities for adaptation include cultural venues: museum, libraries, ateliers, theaters, etc. Also, they concluded that the price is highly overestimated and the state, and not the factory, is still officially owner of some of the land within the complex.

Several leaseholders occupy some of the objects. Best known is the alternative theatre house "KPGT" which held the first show, as part of the BITEF festival in 1994; in 1995, it moved into one of the buildings.

== Future ==
In 2017 city announced the bidding for an architectural competition concerning the wider Careva Ćuprija area (hippodrome, Sugar Refinery and the "Jugopetrol" complex), 55 hectares (140 acres) in total. In September 2017 the winning project was announced, a work of Marija Krsmanović Stringeta, Anđelka Badnjar and Milena Kordić. The present "Jugopetrol" depots will be demolished and the hotel and the sports center will be built instead. The total area of the complex will be 64,000 m^{2} (690,000 sq ft) and it will not be higher than 18 m (59 ft), or 4 floors. Two separate buildings (hotel and the sports center) will be shaped like the curved waves. From the complex, a new system of pathways will allow the entrance into the hippodrome from the side which is not accessible to the visitors today, while in front the buildings the square will be constructed. From the square, paths through the wooded area will connect it to the old factory. Industrial halls will be renovated. As for the protected objects, they will remain as they are, since they are not owned by the city. Within the factory complex, on the area of 9.9 ha (24 acres), some of the objects will be adapted into the artistic colonies, research centers, bookstores, souvenir shops, etc., though all of them will have to preserve the authentic look of the objects. The monuments to Dimitrije Tucović and the strikers who were killed in World War II will be restored. A footbridge over the Radnička Street will be built, to directly connect the refinery complex to Ada Ciganlija.

In October 2018 city officially announced its intention of purchasing the sugar refinery complex, thus becoming its legal proprietor. In February 2022 city declared the Old Refinery and surrounding 12 hectares (30 acres) a cultural center which can't be used for any other purposes. City and state plan to jointly buy out the complex from the bankruptcy estate.

City managed to acquire the former "Jugopetrol" section, adjacent to the refinery complex, and part of the same project, through the exchange with the Naftna Industrija Srbije. The city announced selling of this land in November 2021, where the potential buyer and future investor has no obligation to follow the already accepted project. City also announced that construction of shopping molls, supermarkets, gas stations, wholesale markets, warehouses or commercial garages is forbidden. Cultural and sports complexes are allowed. Some of the existing structures, like the watch tower, a residential house, and chimney of the former heating plant, have to remain intact, or eventually to be renovated. On 17 December 2021, city sold the lot to the controversial "Belgrade Waterfront" investor. Political opposition and activists criticized the purchase, citing dubious and haste process, and the fact that "Belgrade Waterfront" purchased the lot for €27 million, while at the same time it owes €100 million to the city.

On 24 May 2019, a five-storeys Ada Mol shopping mall was opened right across the complex. Unrelated to any of the previous plans, the mall's project envisioned a footbridge which would directly connect the mall with the pedestrian section of the Radnička Street in front of the former factory. When construction began in May 2020, it was announced that the project includes extended footbridge from factory directly to the Ada Ciganlija's main entrance. Original deadline was set for September 2020. Though the project was described as "not really complicated", the deadline was first moved to 1 December 2020, and then to 15 March 2021, before being moved to 30 Apr 2021. The construction works were effectively completed in May 2021, but the footbridge remained closed, and the opening was moved to March 2022, but then prolonged to August 2022.

== Architecture ==
The buildings are typical examples of the late 19th century industrial architecture in northern and central Europe. Concerning architectural merits, only the central building, the machine room, stands out. It was made of brick and has a characteristic Lombard band (bogen-friz) under the roof. The reconstructions done during the Interbellum and after the World War II, apart from adding new machines also expanded some of the buildings. These extensions changed some of the original architectural features of the complex.

== Protection ==
In the 1980s it was included into the Topčider Spatial Cultural-Historical Unit of Exceptional Importance, as an important work of industrial architecture.

The complex itself was declared a cultural monument in 1984 (Službeni list grada Beograda, No. 23/84). The protected area covers 7.4 ha (18 acres) and includes 7 objects.
