= Sunčana Padina =

Sunčana Padina (Serbian Cyrillic: Сунчана падина) is an urban neighborhood of Belgrade, the capital of Serbia. It is located in Belgrade's municipality of Čukarica.

Sunčana Padina is the southern extension of Banovo Brdo neighborhood, bordered by Golf Naselje and Banovo Brdo to the north, Košutnjak to the east, and Žarkovo's extensions of Repište to the south and Julino Brdo to the east.

Sunčana Padina is a new neighborhood, stretching partially into the area of the Sports Center Košutnjak to the west.

The name of the neighborhood is descriptive: Sunčana Padina is Serbian for sunny slope
