= Church of St. George, Banovo Brdo =

Church in Belgrade, Serbia

Church of the Saint George
- Црква светог Ђорђа (Баново брдо)
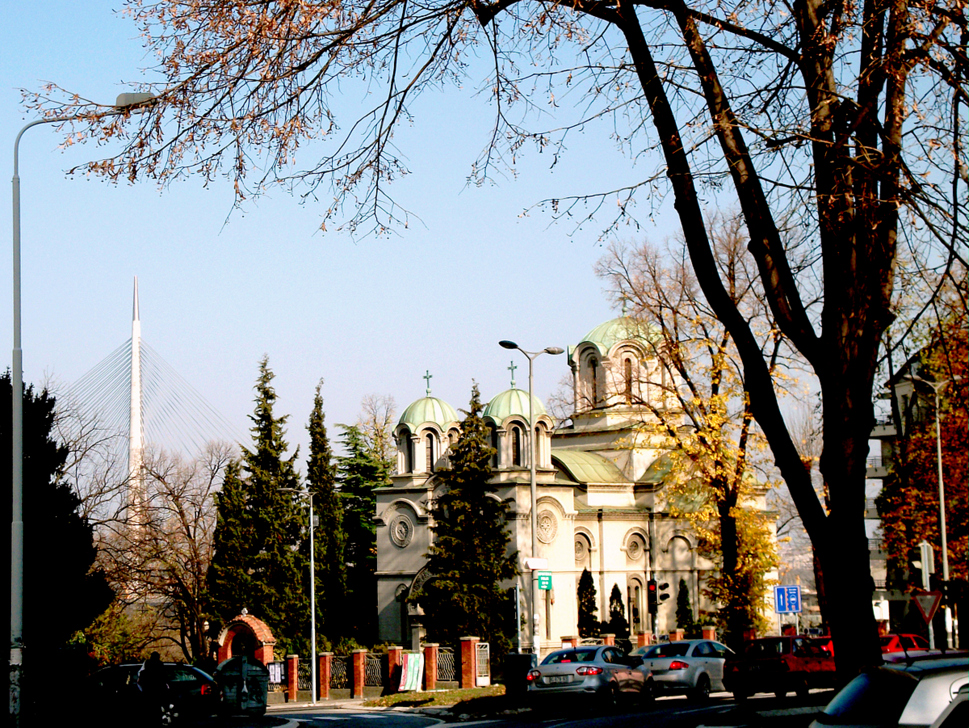
- Church of the Saint George
- Location: Banovo Brdo, Belgrade
- Country: Serbia
- Denomination: Serbian Orthodox Church

Architecture
- Architect: Androsov
- Years built: 1928–1932
- Completed: 1932

Church of St. George is the Serbian Orthodox Church, located in Banovo Brdo, in Čukarica, Belgrade, Serbia. Built between 1928 and 1932, the church was designed by Russian architect Androsov, and is situated on the edge of a hill overlooking the Sava River.
