= Golf Naselje =

Coordinates: 44°46′20″N 20°25′09″E

Golf Naselje (Serbian Cyrillic: Голф Насеље) is an urban neighborhood of Belgrade, the capital of Serbia. It is located in Belgrade's municipality of Čukarica.

== Location ==
Golf Naselje is a modern settlement in the vicinity of the sport center Košutnjak, the easternmost extension of the Banovo Brdo. It is bordered by the Košutnjak park to the north and east, Sunčana Padina to the south and Banovo Brdo to the west.

== Restaurant Golf ==
Predating the neighborhood, a restaurant was built on top of Košutnjak in c.1930. It was designed by Dragiša Brašovan, as a rustic edifice with cellar, ground floor and a loft. The main façade, facing the garden, is made of 5 large, arched, glassed openings. The middle one serves as the door between the winter salon and summer garden. Main entrance into the restaurant is built on the side of the building.

In 1936, golf courses were built around the restaurant, which gave the name to the venue. There were 9 greens and foreign ambassadors considered the courses "among the most beautiful in Europe". The initiative for the golf complex, which included the building of the Golf Club, came from the regent, Prince Paul of Yugoslavia.

The building was restored in 1946, after World War II. It was originally used as the children's vacation and recuperation facility and restaurant. The venue was to be liquidated so it was taken over by the Hospitality Management Chamber which adapted it into the pre-service training facility for the Masters School in 1955. As number of students grew, the building was annexed with 3 classrooms, 18 rooms and the great hall which continues into the terrace. In 1960 it was renamed Catering School which became part of the Catering Educational Center in 1963. Students were moved from the boarding rooms in Zeleni Venac into the restaurant in 1975, but the school moved out from the restaurant completely in 1978, which continued as a hospitality venue of its own.

== Characteristics ==
The whole neighborhood was named after the restaurant.

== Administration ==
The neighborhood was mostly organized as the local community, sub-municipal administrative unit, of Blagoje Parović. It had a population of 6,616 in 1981, 7,623 in 1991 and 9,447 in 2002. Prior to the 2011 census, it was merged into the Mihajlovac local community, which includes much wider area.
