= Belgrade Hippodrome =

Horse racing venue located in Belgrade, Serbia

Coordinates: 44.7861°N 20.4266°E

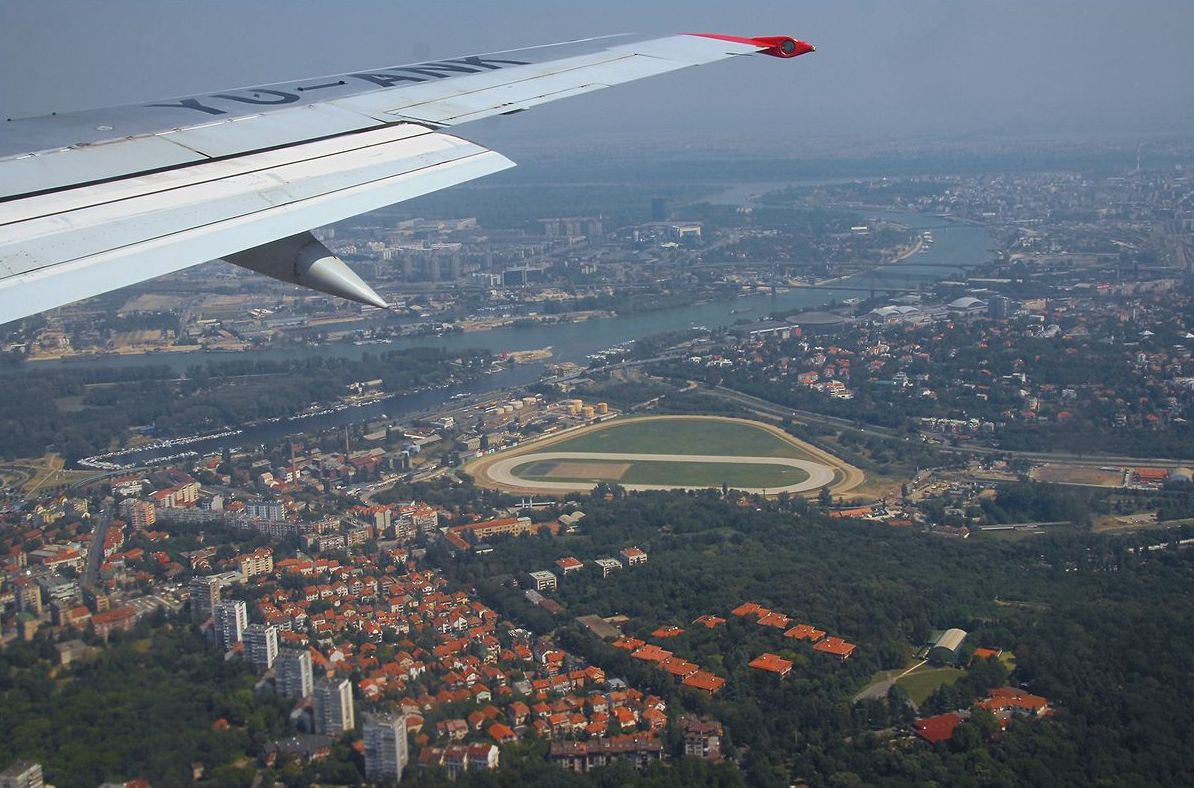
- Aerial view of the Hippodrome
- Interactive map of Belgrade Hippodrome

The Belgrade Hippodrome is a horse racing venue located in Careva Ćuprija, Belgrade, Serbia.

First modern horse races in Belgrade, based on those held in Western Europe, were organized in 1842, by the former British consul-general George Lloyd Hodges. During the reign of prince Mihailo Obrenović, horse races became an annual event since 1862, with prince himself being one of the participants and creator of the rules. He organized three annual races: for the officers, for the public horsemen and for “anyone else who wanted to participate”. But for decades, the city had no regular horse track. Originally, the races were organized in the, at that time, outskirts of Belgrade: modern Vukov Spomenik neighborhood (close to the University of Belgrade Faculty of Law and Metropol Palace Hotel Belgrade area), and from the 1890s in Marinkova Bara. First Serbian derby was held in the neighborhood of Banjica at the beginning of the 20th century. The Danube circle of the equestrians ”Knez Mihailo” was founded in 1890 and in 1905 Vladislav Ribnikar, a journalist, owner of the Politika newspapers and an avid equestrian, and Jaša Prodanović, a politician, started and initiative for the permanent racetracks.

Hippodrome finally settled in Careva Ćuprija in 1912. Officially, it was open on 28 June 1914 and, because of the situation after the assassination of Archduke Franz Ferdinand of Austria which happened on that day, the hippodrome worked only for one day as a month later the World War I began. By the ukaz issued by king Alexander I of Yugoslavia in 1920, he ceded the hippodrome's land to the Danube circle for the next 75 years, free of lease. In 1921 first gallop derby and Belgrade City Race were held. Trotting races were organized since 1930. After World War II, new Communist government nationalized the track in 1949 and named it “Belgrade Hippodrome”.

In 1981, the venue hosted "Hipodrom '81" rock festival, later nicknamed "Čukarica's Woodstock". It lasted for 36 hours, during the weekend of 5 and 6 September, under the tagline Svi marš na ples, a line taken from the Bijelo Dugme's 1980 song Ha, ha, ha meaning "everybody dance" or "everybody hit the floor". A total of 18 rock bands participated, 15 Yugoslav and 3 foreign, including Bijelo Dugme, Zoran Miščević and Siluete, Divlje Jagode, Film, Haustor, and Iron Maiden. The festival was notorious for bad organization, scrappy stage, no toilets and water, and power outages. Unusually heavy rains turned hippodrome's ground into the mire, and reduced temperature to almost winter conditions. Iron Maiden's Steve Harris, noting that there is no roof above the stage, said if there is rain, everything will probably explode. In the end, the festival finished as planned, and with 36,000 visitors was one of the major rock events in Europe in 1981.

Today, the Hippodrome covers an area of 24 hectares (59 acres). Last major renovation occurred in the 1980s, while on 30 October 1999 a major fire destroyed section of the bleachers, the roof above it and an umpire's tower. In 2006 the bankruptcy proceeding began but was retracted in 2008 and the hippodrome became a city owned enterprise. The highest attendance on one event was recorded in 1989 when the trotting derby was attended by 10,000 spectators.

In March 2017, city manager Goran Vesić said that the hippodrome is just accumulating debts and that the question is whether it is on the right place. As the stories of the city government's wishes to demolish the hippodrome and build a residential and commercial complex instead circulated the public for several years, his statement prompted the public reaction. Other possible indications that the hippodrome will be demolished included the fact that Belgrade was removed from the international racing calendars, the 95th racing season (for 2017) wasn't scheduled and contract with the French partner, signed in 1988 for the period of 30 years, which prevented the city to change the purpose of the hippodrome, expires in 2018. Also, city announced the bidding for an architectural competition concerning the wider Careva Ćuprija area (hippodrome, Sugar Refinery in Čukarica and the "Jugopetrol" complex), 55 hectares (140 acres) in total. Public actions against the relocation and petition ensued. Vesić promptly reacted, stating that he never said that the hippodrome will be demolished and that all this is a nonsense, but then added that a fact is that a new location, on which the hippodrome would develop, should be found.

Certain races were later announced. In May 2017, the conditions of the future bidding were made public by which the hippodrome is kept on its present location. Problems and conditions which the architects participating in the competition should address include: expansion of the grandstand - the great grandstand is to be reconstructed and the eastern is to be expanded; reconstruction of the administrative building, horses quarters and the training center; all the illegally built facilities on the property are to be demolished; construction of the pedestrian bridge which would connect it to Topčider; allowed height of any construction is one floor.

In September 2017 the winning project was announced, a work of Marija Krsmanović Stringeta, Anđelka Badnjar and Milena Kordić. The present "Jugopetrol" depots will be demolished and the hotel and the sports center will be built instead. From that complex, a new system of pathways will allow the entrance into the hippodrome from the side which is not accessible to the visitors today. As for the hippodrome itself, the existing objects will be adapted and expanded. The grandstand will be restored, the VIP stand will be preserved as it is, while the east stand will be tripled in size. Part of the grandstand will be the "green" amphitheater and commercial cascades, with cafés and restaurants, which will also function as a separate commercial venues when there are no races.
