= Smesnica =

Smesnica Смесница Smesnicë
- Village
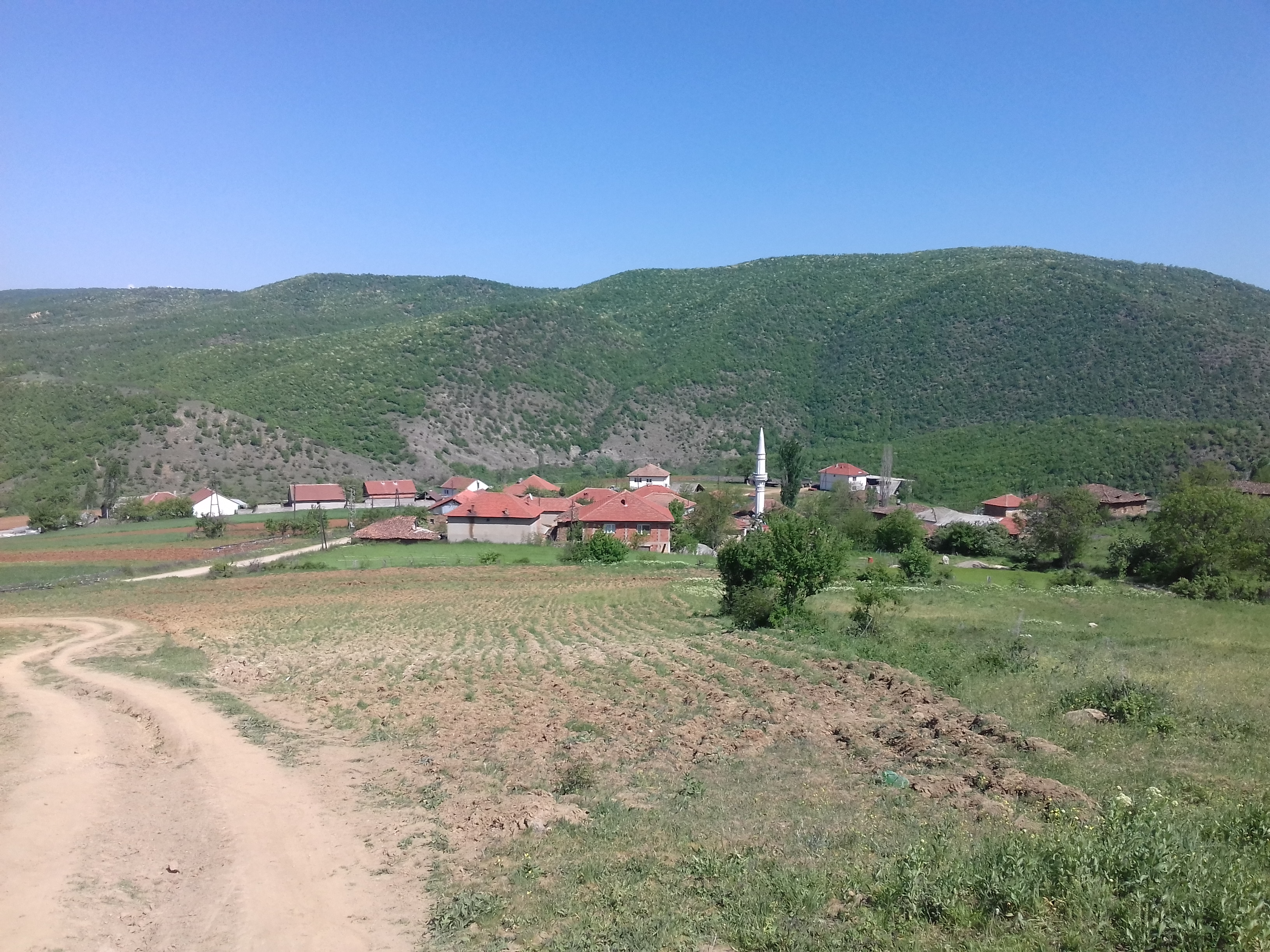

- Location within North Macedonia
- Coordinates: 41°51′N 21°37′E
- Country: North Macedonia
- Region: Skopje
- Municipality: Zelenikovo

Population (2021)
  - Total: 59
- Time zone: UTC+1 (CET)
  - Summer (DST): UTC+2 (CEST)
- Car plates: SK
- Website: .

Smesnica (Macedonian: Смесница, Albanian: Smesnicë) is a village in the municipality of Zelenikovo, North Macedonia.

== Demographics ==
As of the 2021 census, Smesnica had 59 residents with the following ethnic composition:

- Albanians 45
- Persons for whom data are taken from administrative sources 14

According to the 2002 census, the village had a total of 104 inhabitants. Ethnic groups in the village include:

- Albanians 104
