= Carski rez =

Serbian hip hop label

- Founded: 2006
- Founder: Blokovski; Mauzer; Kuer
- Distributor: Independent
- Genre: Hip hop
- Country of origin: Serbia
- Official website: carskirez.com

Carski Rez (short: CRZ, Cyrillic: Царски Рез) is an independent Serbian hip hop label from Belgrade formed in 2006 by Blokovski, Mauzer and Kuer, who make up the group Arhitekti. Carski Rez literally translates into English as caesarean cut, but generally means caesarean section, or c-section in Serbian.

The label has a roster of fifteen artists based in four countries: Serbia, Austria, Canada and Switzerland. With fifteen official releases, it is one of the most prolific labels on the Serbian hip hop scene. Although independent, Carski Rez has occasionally partnered with other music labels (namely Magmedia, owned by the rapper Škabo from Beogradski sindikat) for distribution deals.

Besides its creative output, Carski Rez also offers production services and a professional recording studio.

== History ==
=== Formation and Roster ===
When Spirit Blokovski (aka Kajblo Spirit), Mauzer (then Rastamon), and Kuer founded the group Arhitekti in 2005, it quickly became one of the more popular demo groups on the Belgrade hip-hop scene. This was primarily because its members had previously built a solid reputation as solo artists—most notably Kajblo Spirit, who had independently released the album Čekanje je mučno (The Waiting is Painful), which was retroactively included in the Carski Rez discography as its first official release.

Knowing that domestic music publishing at the time offered little space and interest for hip-hop, Arhitekti decided to form their own label to promote and distribute their future releases. Thus, on May 11, 2006, the working title of the album they were recording at the time became the name of the newly founded independent label: Carski Rez.

From the very beginning, the label was joined by New Belgrade MC and producer Madafankinmjan (MothaphonkinMjan), along with a producer and MC duo from Žarkovo, Skubi end d Ist (Sqb & The Easst). The three of them were connected to the founders of Carski Rez through Blokovski. Mjan and Blokovski had been making songs long before the formation of Arhitekti (Mjan even guested on Kajblo's first release, Čekanje je mučno). Skubi and The Easst had always worked together, but they only began performing as a duo after the breakup of a larger group they had both been part of. In one of their first tracks under the name "Skubi end d Ist," Blokovski contributed the chorus and some additional backing vocals.

By the end of 2006, Carski Rez expanded its roster and went international. The artist lineup was joined by Novi Sad MCs Ask and Miraž, followed by the Canadian duo Babble Goons (Bebl Gunz), which then consisted of Highduke (Hajduk) and Scribe (Skrajb), as well as an MC, DJ, and producer from Switzerland named Baron. With their sharp and aggressive style, Babble Goons had already built a reputation both in Canada and among domestic listeners who followed the Serbian demo rap scene, mainly through the hip-hop internet portal Radivizija. Baron had caught the attention of that same audience back in 2003 with his entirely self-produced album Publika Bezbednosti (Security Audience). Due to its signature dark atmosphere and layered sampling, listeners labeled Baron's music as the "Serbian Def Jux sound."

In 2007, Babble Goons changed their lineup. Scribe left the group, while Earthquake Slick (Rtkvejk Slik), Bigavac, and DJ Grusm joined. Grusm, being of Irish nationality, became the first member of the label who was not of Serbian origin. Scribe remained on the Carski Rez roster as a solo artist.

That same year, Grema Dži, an MC and producer from Austria who handled the post-production on the Babble Goons album, joined the label.

The supergroup Los Losos (Bdat Džutim, Kruks, Fili Pi) joined the roster in 2010.

=== CRZ golden age (2006 - 2012) ===
The foundation was laid with the releases Oproštaj od lošeg snimka by Blokovski and Ritam, priča, bas, fank by MothaphonkinMjan. Songs like "Rep limunada" and "Damn", alongside "Mrzim" by Arhitekti, found their audience, while the "Rezači" (the Cutters) guest-starred on all major rap radio shows and performed across Serbia.

Arhitekti, together with Bauk Squad and FTP, performed at Exit Festival 06 as the sole representatives of the domestic demo hip-hop scene. Aiming to promote the new label, "Promo 1" CDs—a compilation featuring tracks from all current label members—were distributed at the festival. This established the Carski Rez practice of releasing annual "Promo" compilations for free distribution.In the autumn of that same year, Carski Rez organized its first independent concert at the Belgrade club Mint, as part of the promotion for the two releases that had dropped a few months prior (Spirit Blokovski – Oproštaj od lošeg snimka and Madafankinmjan – Ritam, priča, bas, fank).

The opening of the official Carski Rez studio in 2007 in Banovo Brdo marked a new chapter in the label's work. Two years after their collective beginning, Arhitekti released their first album, “Arhitekti EP” whose lead single Mrzim (I Hate) received moderate airplay on Serbian radio stations. Four months later Blokovski released his third solo effort, Oblici od Oblaka deo 1 (Cloud Shapes Pt. 1) which was voted as the best demo album of the year by visitors of Rad I Vizija, now Serbia's premier hip hop resource on the internet.

Following the release of the Babble Goons album Critical Condition, Skrajb left the group, but continues with Carski Rez as a solo artist. Taking his place are MCs Earthquake Slick and Bigavac, and DJ Grusm, the only member of Carski Rez who is not of Serbian descent. They continue to perform in Ottawa and are currently working on a new album.

In 2008, Oblici od Oblaka deo 2 (Cloud Shapes Pt. 2) repeated the success of its predececor, earning Blokovski another demo album of the year title at Rad I Vizija, while the album's leading single "Ha Ha" was voted best demo song (Sqb & The Easst also found themselves in the final round). Skubi's side project “Skubi predstavlja Gazda Paju” (Skubi Presents: Gazda Paja – Funk'd Up) was voted as the year's best EP.

June 2008 saw the first nationwide release of a Carski Rez album, a compilation featuring all of the label's artists and titled “Rez 1” in cooperation with the music label Magmedia. This release allowed for new exposure, including two critically acclaimed singles from the album, “Kosmos” by Skubi & The Easst and “Gengsta Fank” by Mothaphonkin Mjan.

That same year, the label was joined by Supreme, an MC from Zaječar who formed a duo with Blokovski. In September 2009, they released their collaborative album "Samo Lagano". With this release, promotional activities expanded across the region; in addition to the major hubs of Belgrade and Novi Sad, promotional performances were held in Banja Luka and Podgorica.

That same year, after long preparation, what would turn out to be the first in a series of cult compilations of MCs gathered around producer Skubi appeared in the form of the CD "Bonus Trake".

A steady stream of albums, EPs, and singles followed, and in 2010, Skubi struck again—this time as part of a lineup featuring Ill G, Skubi, and DJ Rokam—releasing the album "Šta Ima".

The fourth Promo compilation by the label's artists was distributed by hand at concerts throughout 2010. Skubi closed out this highly productive year with the compilation "AE", which introduced a much-needed duo for the first time—Kruks and The Easst.

In 2011, on the label's anniversary, Blokovski released a double edition: the album "Prototip" and the mixtape "Dete sa loptom uvek nađe društvo za igru". This release pushed the boundaries of their reach, bringing Carski Rez out of the deep underground and into magazine columns, alternative music charts, and recognition far beyond the rap audience where they had already achieved cult status. To make the year complete, Skubi delivered the compilation "Baos", gathering over 20 artists—including Juice, Coby, Gazda Paja, and Bvana—alongside the standard crew of Rezaci.

Supreme and Blokovski continued their collaboration with the concept release "Zumbul i Zvekan". The 2012 promotion of this album during a mini-tour through Belgrade, Novi Sad, and Pančevo also marked the eventual end of the golden era of the Carski Rez label, its concert activities, and its hyper-production.

The massive influence of Carski Rez on the alternative scene at the time is best illustrated by the project "Reci Sta Imas". Following a single call from Blokovski, more than 40 regional MCs submitted their work for a song, resulting in 15 selected artists forming one of the longest cyphers in the history of the regional scene.

On the final day of 2012, Blokovski released the EP "Ništa Naročito".

==== CRZ New Moments (2013-2024) ====
In March 2013, Skubi released "Sinee!", featuring collaborations with names like Struka, Škabo, and Kendi.

Shortly after, Mauzer, one of the label's co-founders, dropped his solo album "Dribling na petoparcu", which holds a special place among fans of the CRZ sound.

DJ Kobazz and Skubi took stock of things in 2016 with the mixed mixtape "Skubazz Volume Two". Soon after, the compilation "Torimas" was released; in addition to featuring new names on the roster like Mikri, Marčelo, and Ivana Zečević, it was marked by a deluxe package with accompanying merchandise such as a T-shirt and stickers.

In 2020, Carski Rez - "Lost Tapes" gathered all the songs that slipped through the label's work during its first 14 years but did not make it onto previous releases.

The Novi Sad king of punchlines and wordplay, Ask, published his debut "Desktop.rar" on the symbolic date of December 13, 2021, where, alongside a team of local producers, Kuer and Shmac Daddy (Bauk Squad) provided the beats.

Skubi's collaborations with various MCs brought two EPs, Lou Benny and Kila33, as well as a single together with Ukov and DJ BKO.

On the final day of 2024, Blokovski released the album Dan mrmota.

==== Carski Rez Today (2025-2026) ====
The beginning of 2026 was marked by a collaboration between producer zicabitz and Blokovski. A new drumless sound, dubbed "meskalin rep" once again pushes the genre boundaries on the Serbian hip-hop scene, while the single "Danka" announces new releases and projects that directly and indirectly involve Kuer, Skubi, and DJ Grusm.

In April 2026, Ask presents "Još jedna jedina", a conceptual EP over Ant's beats, with mixing and mastering credited to Kuer.

== Current List of Artists ==
- Blokovski (MC, Belgrade)
- Mauzer (MC, Belgrade)
- Kuer (producer, Belgrade)
- Mjandžizl (aka Mothaphonkin Mjan), (producer, MC, Belgrade)
- The Easst (MC, Belgrade)
- Skubi (producer, Belgrade)
- Ask (MC, Novi Sad)
- Mirage (MC, Novi Sad)
- Supreme (MC, Zaječar)
- Baron (MC, producer, DJ, Schaffhausen, Switzerland)
- Grema (MC, producer, Vienna, Austria).
- Skrajb (MC, Ottawa, Canada)
- Earthquake Slick (MC, Ottawa, Canada)
- Bigavac (MC, Ottawa, Canada)
- HighDuke (MC, producer, Ottawa, Canada)
- DJ Grusm (DJ, Ottawa, Canada)

== Discography ==
Carski Rez releases generally fall into one of four categories: Albums are available either as free downloads, or in retail. In between, some albums are offered both as free downloads or as retail CD's. Finally, there is a series of Promo CD's released annually, which are not sold but handed out for free at various events. The type of release is noted in the brackets along with the year.

1. Kajblo Spirit – Čekanje je mučno (2005, retail)
2. Spirit Blokovski – Oproštaj od lošeg snimka (2006, retail)
3. Madafankinmjan – Ritam, Priča, Bas, Fank (2006, retail)
4. Carski rez - Promo 1 (2006, free CD)
5. Miraž - Sinkretizam 16 (2006, retail)
6. Arhitekti – EP (2007, retail)
7. Spirit Blokovski – Oblici od oblaka deo 1. (2007, free download/retail)
8. Babble Goons - Critical Condition (2007, retail)
9. Carski rez – Promo 2 (2007, free CD)
10. Skubi predstavlja Gazda Paju - FUNK'D UP (2008, free download/retail)
11. Spirit Blokovski – Oblici od Oblaka deo 2. (2008, retail/free download)
12. Carski Rez – Rez 1. (Carski Rez/Magmedija) (2008, retail)
13. Baron – The Re-Cuts (2008, free download)
14. Carski Rez – Promo 3 (2009, free CD)
15. Skubi in the DJ Rokam's Mix (2009, free download)
16. Supreme & Blokovski – Samo Lagano (2009, free download)
17. Mauzer - Carski Kobazz (2009, free download)
18. DJ Dust & Blokovski - Мој друже (2009, free download)
19. Crz Instrumentals 1 (2009, free download)
20. Skubi - Bonus Trake (2009, retail)
21. The Easst - Koga Briga (2010, free download)
22. Blokovski i AC3PO - Hologram RMX EP (2010, free download)
23. Baron - Publika Bezbednosti: RELOADED (2010, free download)
24. ILL G, Skubi, DJ Rokam - Sta Ima (2010, CD)
25. DJ Kobazz i Skubi - SKUBAZZ! umiksovana kaseta vol.1 (2010, free download)
26. Blokovski - Ko sam ja (2010, free download)
27. Carski Rez – Promo 4 (2010, free cd)
28. Skubi - АЕ (2010, free download)
29. Blokovski - Dete sa loptom uvek nađe društvo za igru (2011, free CD)
30. Blokovski - Prototip (2011, retail)
31. Skubi - Baos (2011)
32. Supreme i Blokovski - Zumbul i Zvekan (2012)
33. Blokovski - Ništa Naročito (2012)
34. Skubi - Sinee! (2013)
35. Mauzer - Dribling na petoparcu (2013)
36. DJ Kobazz i Skubi - SKUBAZZ! umiksovana kaseta vol. 2 (2016)
37. Skubi - Torimas (2016)
38. Carski Rez - Lost Tapes (2020)
39. Ask - Desktop.rar (2021)
40. Blokovski - Dan Mrmota (2024)
41. Blokovski - Danka (2026)
42. Ask - Još Jedna Jedina (2026)
43. ILL G, Skubi, DJ Rokam - Novi Dan (2026)
44. Blokovski - Rajske Ptice (2026)
