= Zelenikovo, North Macedonia =

Zelenikovo Зелениково (Macedonian)
- Village
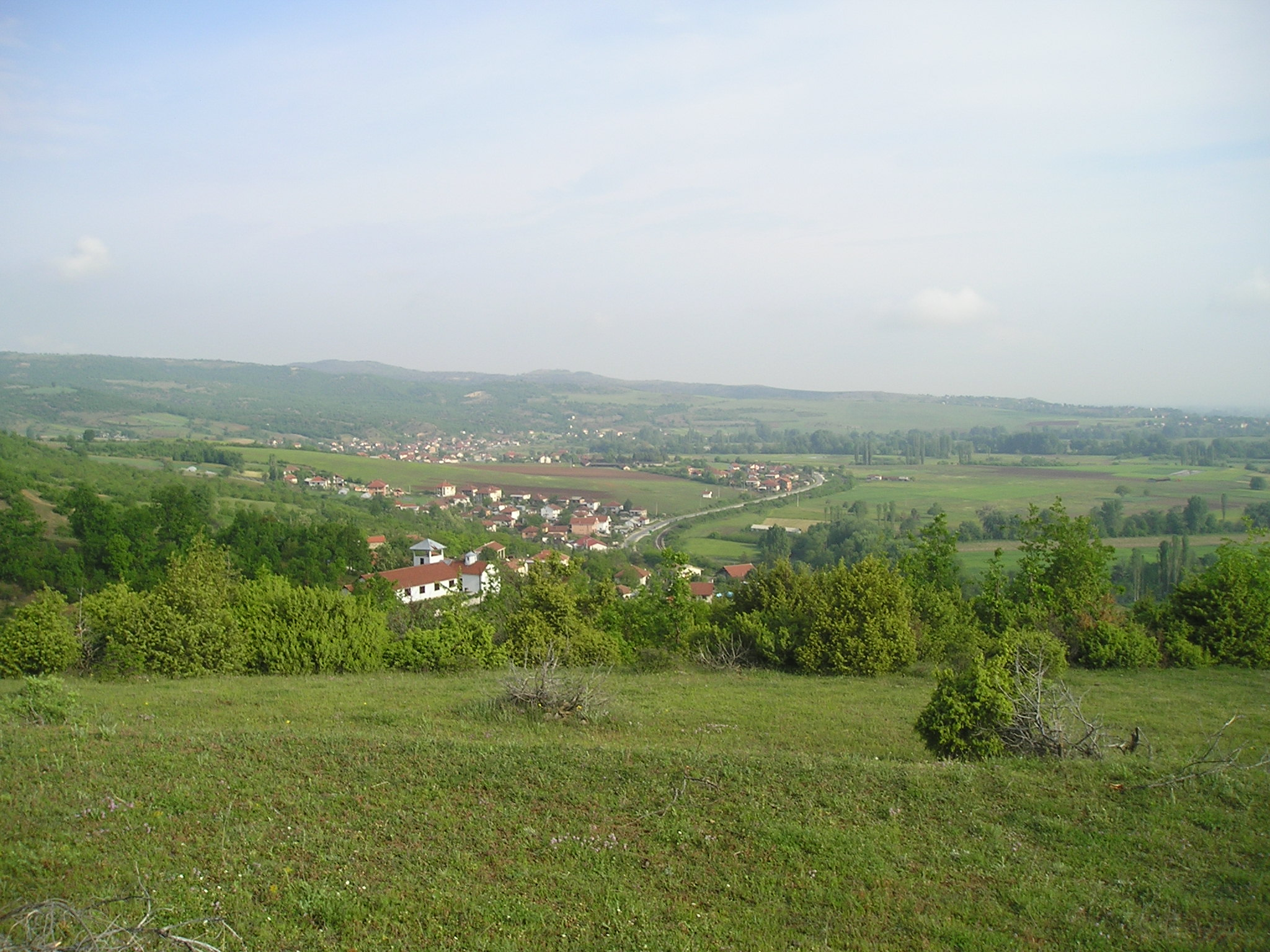

- Location within North Macedonia
- Country: North Macedonia
- Region: Skopje
- Municipality: Zelenikovo

Population (2021)
  - Total: 1,107
- Time zone: UTC+1 (CET)
  - Summer (DST): UTC+2 (CEST)
- Vehicle registration: SK
- Website: .

Zelenikovo (Macedonian: Зелениково) is a village in the municipality of Zelenikovo, North Macedonia.

== Demographics ==
As of the 2021 census, Zelenikovo had 1,107 residents with the following ethnic composition:

- Macedonians 977
- Persons for whom data are taken from administrative sources 82
- Roma 29
- Serbs 15
- Others 4

According to the 2002 census, the village had a total of 771 inhabitants. Ethnic groups in the village include:

- Macedonians 697
- Serbs 8
- Romani 61
- Aromanians 1
- Others 4
