= Careva Ćuprija, Belgrade =

Neighborhood in Belgrade, Serbia

Careva Ćuprija Царева Ћуприја
- Neighborhood
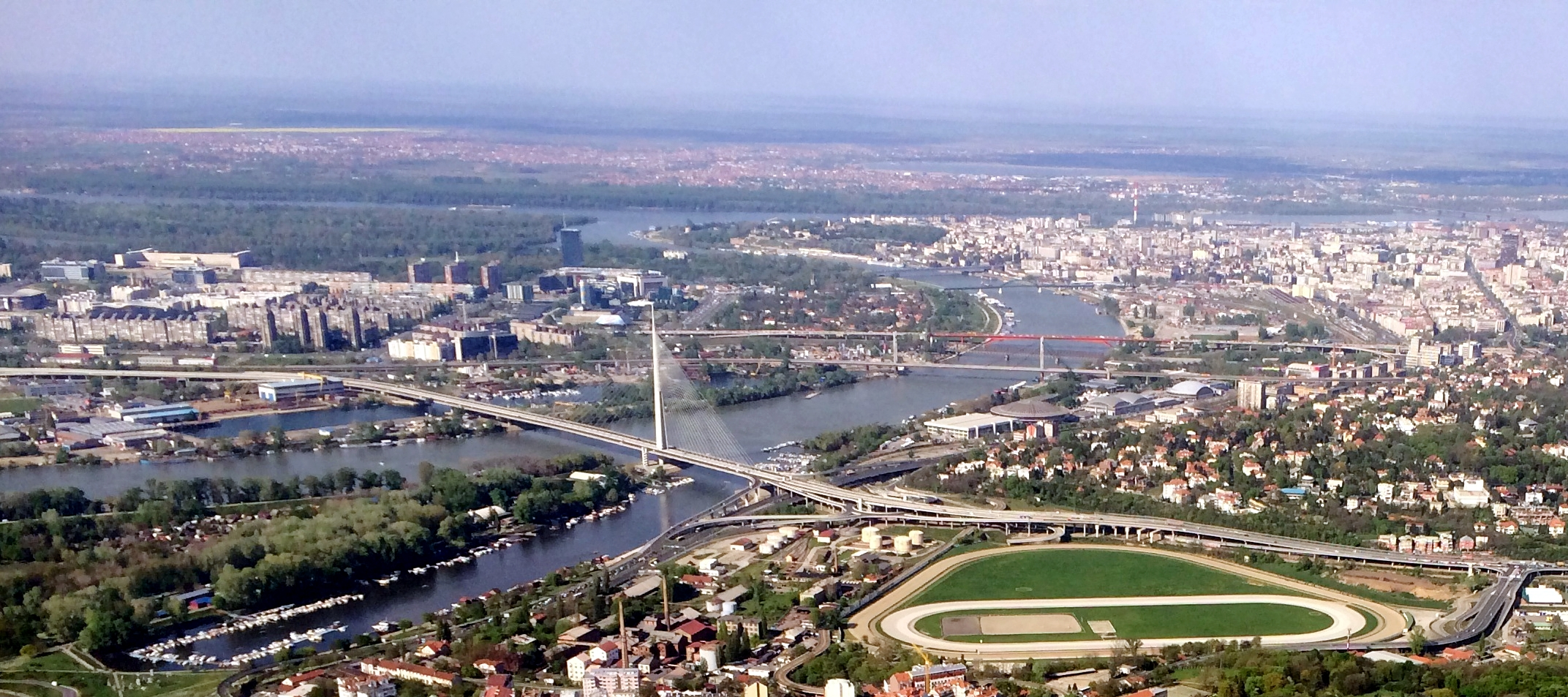
- Careva Ćuprija, including the Belgrade Hippodrome and Ada Bridge
- Interactive map of Careva Ćuprija
- Country: Serbia
- City: Belgrade
- Municipality: Čukarica

Careva Ćuprija (Serbian Cyrillic: Царева Ћуприја) is an urban neighborhood of Belgrade, the capital of Serbia. It is located in Belgrade's municipality of Čukarica.

== Location ==
Careva Ćuprija is a small neighborhood, located on the western bank of the Topčiderska reka, on the border of Čukarica and Savski Venac municipalities. Careva Ćuprija is bordered by the Boulevard of Vojvoda Mišić and Senjak neighborhood to the north, Topčider to the east and south, Banovo Brdo to the southwest and the Sava river's Bay of Čukarica to the west, across the Ada Ciganlija.

== History ==
During the Interbellum, the Shell company built a large complex of oil tanks in the area along the modern Radnička Street, next to river. The area was heavily bombed during the Allied bombing of Yugoslavia in World War II. Especially heavy was the bombing on 3 July 1944, when the tanks, and the wider area of old and north parts of Čukarica were carpet bombed. The tanks were rebuilt after the war, and in time became known as the Jugopetrol tanks.

== Characteristics ==
A stadium of the BASK football team is located in the neighborhood, a shooting range and the most prominent feature of all, Belgrade's horse racetrack. The shooting range was built in 1957 and hosted the 2nd ISSF European Shooting Championships in the same year. It is used by the members of the Serbian shooting sports team. In May 2020, reconstruction of the shooting range and construction of the new training ground for sport shooters was announced for 2021.

The name of the neighborhood, Careva Ćuprija, in Serbian means emperor's bridge. It was named after a bridge over the Topčiderska reka, built to connect the rural districts of Topčider and Žarkovo, which bordered at the river at the time. Though already mentioned in 1866, it is not known after which emperor it was named.

== Transportation ==
After the railway was introduced in Serbia in 1884, a railroad was conducted over the small stone bridge across the Topčiderka. The narrow-gauge railway connected the Belgrade Main railway station to Čukarica.

In the northern part, between Careva Ćuprija and the neighborhood of Senjak, an underpass was constructed in 1928. Becoming known as the "Underpass in Radnička street", it was dug beneath the first Serbian railroad, Belgrade-Niš, in order to conduct another railroad, which was connecting Belgrade to Obrenovac. In 1968 the lower rail tracks were removed and the underpass became a car road for the commuters which travel to downtown. In the next decades, it became notorious due to the traffic jams. In 2013 the underpass was closed for traffic, due to the construction of the loop "Radnička", eastern interchange of the Ada Bridge. Since then, it is used only as the service road for the bridge and interchange maintenance.

== Hippodrome ==
The Belgrade Hippodrome has been located in Careva Ćuprija since 1912-1914.
