= Tisovica, Zelenikovo =

Tisovica Тисовица Tisovicë
- Village
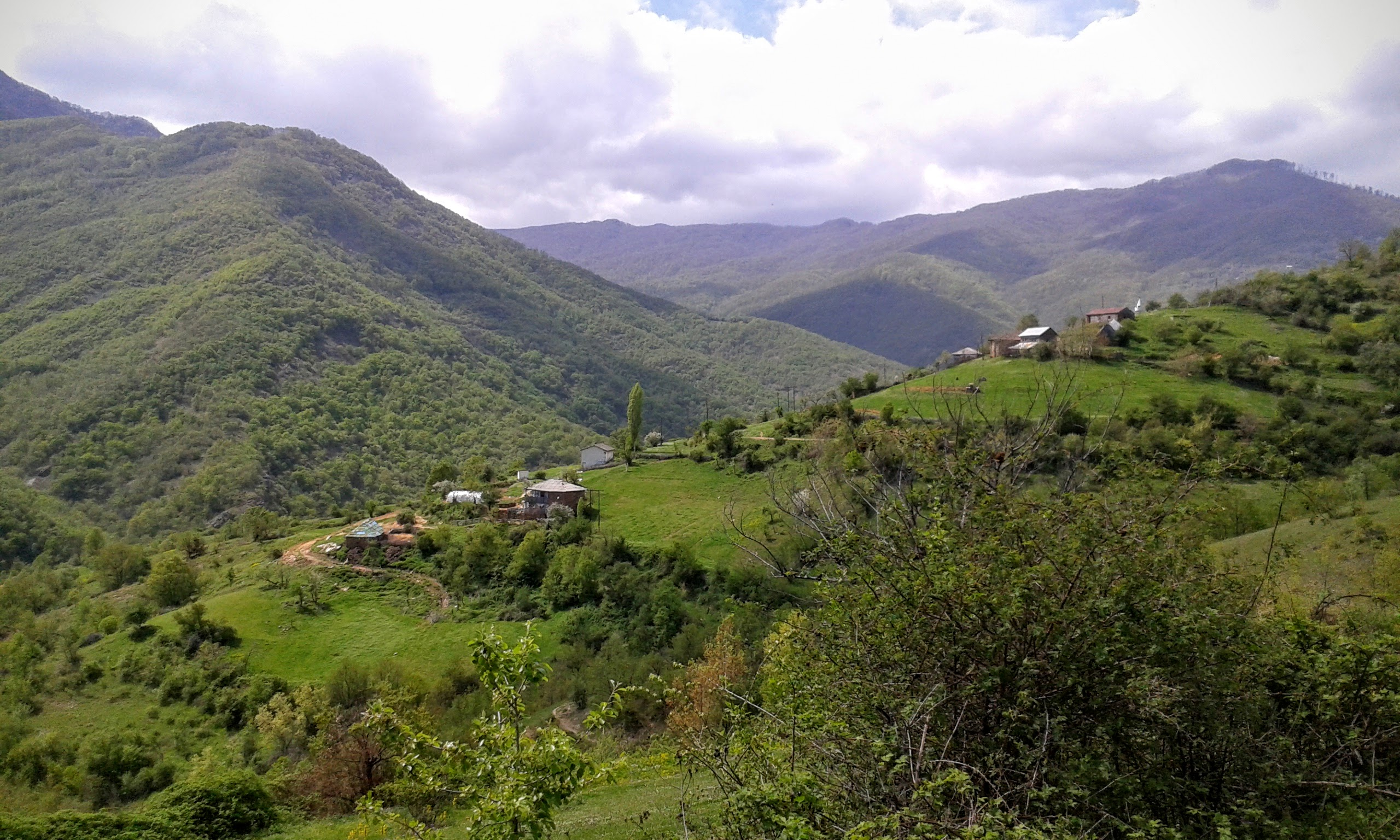

- Location within North Macedonia
- Coordinates: 41°49′15″N 21°32′24″E
- Country: North Macedonia
- Region: Skopje
- Municipality: Zelenikovo

Population (2021)
  - Total: 10
- Time zone: UTC+1 (CET)
  - Summer (DST): UTC+2 (CEST)
- Car plates: SK
- Website: .

Tisovica (Macedonian: Тисовица, Albanian: Tisovicë) is a village in the municipality of Zelenikovo, North Macedonia.

== Demographics ==
As of the 2021 census, Tisovica had 10 residents with the following ethnic composition:

- Albanians 9
- Macedonians 1

According to the 2002 census, the village had a total of 53 inhabitants. Ethnic groups in the village include:

- Albanians 53
