= 1 Turgenjev Street =

The building at 1, Turgenjev Street in Belgrade
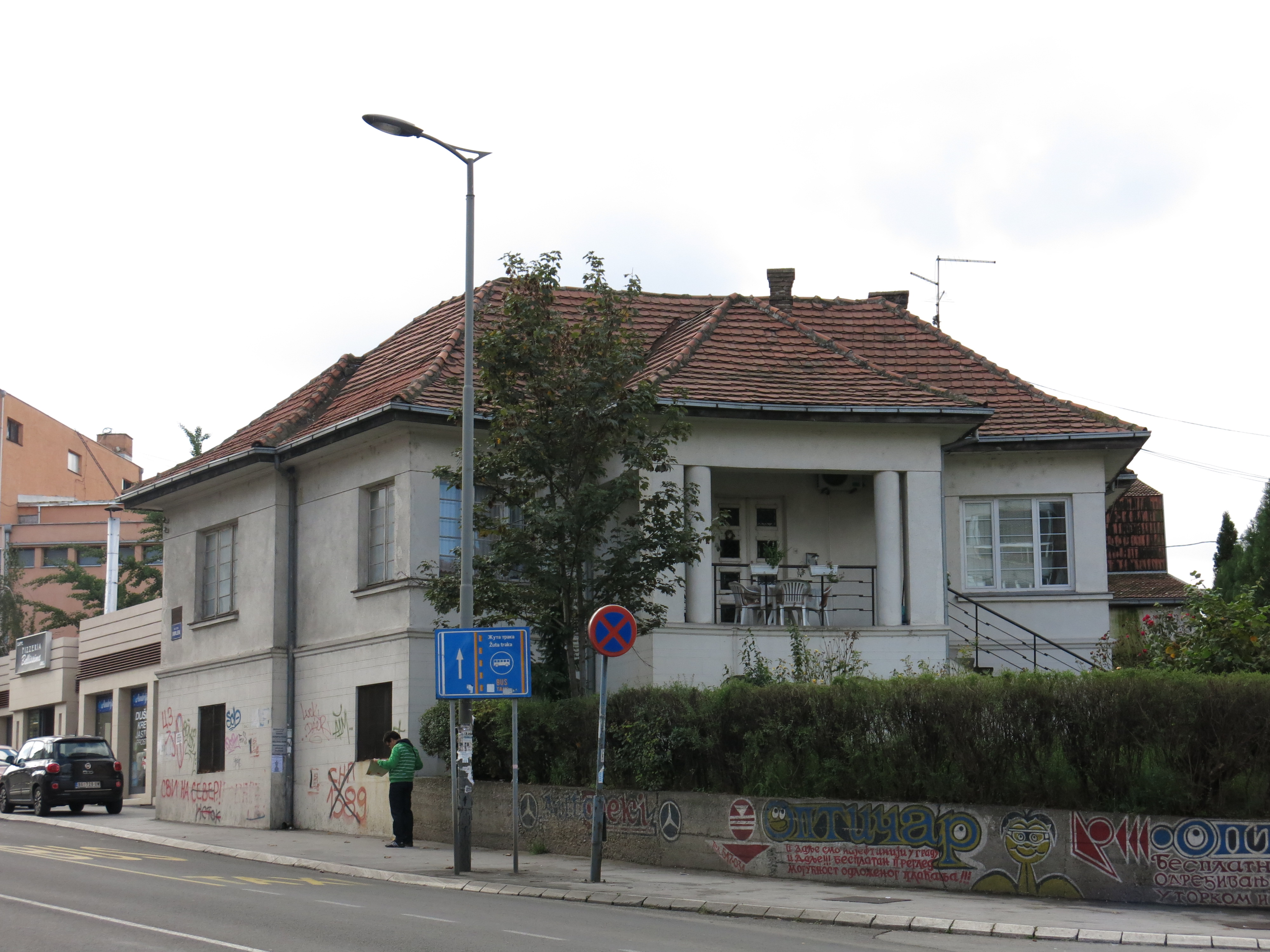
- Turgenjev Street in Belgrade

- Location within Belgrade
- Interactive map of the The building at 1, Turgenjev Street in Belgrade area

General information
- Status: Cultural monument
- Location: Belgrade, Čukarica, Serbia
- Coordinates: 44.7845°N 20.4178°E
- Completed: 1935; 91 years ago

Website
- beogradskonasledje.rs

The building at 1, Turgenjev Street in Belgrade was built in 1935, and it is important for the organization and operation of the Communist Party of Yugoslavia. It now stands as a cultural monument.

== Architecture ==
It was built as a family home for the doctor Radomir Ćirković. The building is located on the corner of Turgenjev and Kirovljev Street in the Municipality of Čukarica, it is slightly indented with a small garden in front of the front facade. It was built according to the project of the municipal architect – engineer Marko Andrejević as a two-wing corner building whose main facade with a terrace in the loggia faces the intersection, while the side facades face the regulatory line of the mentioned streets. The two storey building is built of solid material – brick – and covered with tiles and features a stone staircase. There used to be three entrances to this building: two led from Turgenjev Street to the ground premises, and the third led from Kirovljev Street to the basement. One of the first two entries was later walled up.

== History ==
In addition to the owner, party activists lived in the building, such as Lazar Kočović and Petruša Kočović-Zorić. Since 1936, the building became a meeting place and temporary residence of prominent members of the Communist Party of Yugoslavia. In 1943, Lazar Kočović as an activist of NLM was arrested and then executed in the Banjica camp. His sister Petruša stayed in the same apartment until 1945.

In the years before World War II, the layout of the building and its position was suited to the needs of the Party. According to Petruša's memories, as well as the memories of other activists, numerous activists met or hid in this building from police persecution. Sreten Žujović, Moma Marković, Svetozar Vukmanović-Tempo and many others stayed at the house. Before the war, numerous meetings and consultations took place in the building. The two most important consultations of the Provincial Committee of the CPY for Serbia were held in February and March 1941 in the building. The consultation held on 30 March was attended by Josip Broz Tito, Rade Končar, Ivan Milutinović, Žuro Strugar, Miloš Matijević, Lazar Koliševski and many others. A number of papers were published about this meeting, in addition to the memories of the participants and the number of articles in newspapers and magazines. This event which took place in March was also described in the monograph "Čukarica, Labor Movement and NLW", as well as in the sixth volume of Tito's collected works.
