= Aldinci =

Aldinci Алдинци Alldincë
- Village
- Location within North Macedonia
- Coordinates: 41°48′06″N 21°25′44″E
- Country: North Macedonia
- Region: Skopje
- Municipality: Studeničani
- Time zone: UTC+1 (CET)
  - Summer (DST): UTC+2 (CEST)
- Car plates: SK
- Website: .

Aldinci (Macedonian: Алдинци, Albanian: Alldincë) is a village in the municipality of Studeničani, North Macedonia.

== Demographics ==
According to the 2021 census, the village had no permanent inhabitants. Ethnic groups in the village include:

Year	Macedonian	Albanian	Turks	Romani	Vlachs	Serbs	Bosniaks	Others	Total
2002	...	3	...	...	...	...	...	...	3
2021	...	...	...	...	...	...	...	...	0
