= Zelenikovo Municipality =

Municipality of North Macedonia

Coordinates: 41°52′59″N 21°35′22″E

Municipality of Zelenikovo Општина Зелениково
- Rural municipality
- Flag

- Country: North Macedonia
- Region: Skopje
- Municipal seat: Zelenikovo

Government
  - Mayor: Kosta Manevski (VMRO-DPMNE)

Area
  - Total: 176.95 km^{2} (68.32 sq mi)

Population (2021)
  - Total: 3,361
  - Density: 18.99/km^{2} (49.19/sq mi)
- Time zone: UTC+1 (CET)
- Postal code: 1053
- Area code: 02
- Vehicle registration: SK

Zelenikovo Municipality (Macedonian: Зелениково) is a municipality in the central part of North Macedonia. The municipal seat is located in the village Zelenikovo. The municipality is located in the Skopje Statistical Region.

== Geography ==
The municipality borders Studeničani Municipality to the west, Petrovec Municipality to the northeast, Čaška Municipality to the south, and Veles Municipality to the southeast.

== Demographics ==
According to the 2021 North Macedonia census, Zelenikovo Municipality has 3,361 inhabitants. Ethnic groups in the municipality:

	1953		1961		1971		1981		1994		2002		2021	
	Number	%	Number	%	Number	%	Number	%	Number	%	Number	%	Number	%
TOTAL	5,284	100	4,696	100	4,109	100	4,363	100	4,236	100	4,077	100	3,361	100
Macedonians	1,679	31.8	1,877	40	2,035	49.5	2,198	50.4	2,384	56.3	2,522	61.86	2,407	71.62
Albanians	1,680	31.8	1,187	25.3	773	18.8	1,511	34.6	1,543	36.4	1,206	29.58	415	12.35
Bosniaks											191	4.68	187	5.56
Serbs											45	1.1	46	1.37
Roma											92	2.26	44	1.31
Turks	1,765	33.4	1,426	30.4	849	20.7	266	6.1	11	0.3	1	0.02	5	0.15
Vlachs											1	0.02		
Other / Undeclared / Unknown	160	3	206	4.4	452	11	398	8.9	298	7	19	0.48	12	0.35
Persons for whom data are taken from administrative sources													245	7.29
