= Aćim Doljanac =

Prominent figure in the First Serbian Uprising

Aćim Doljanac (Аћим Дољанац) was a prominent figure in the First Serbian Uprising. He took part in several battles, and he also performed actions of another kind, on the direct order of Karadjordje Petrović.

== Origin and family ==
Aćim Doljanac was born in the former village of Doljani, which was located south of Ostruznica, near Belgrade. His surname was formed after the name of this settlement. Aćim's son was Radovan Doljančević. The descendants of Acim Doljanac are represented by the Doljančevićs in Ostružnica. Judging by their specific baptismal feast, St. Ignatius the God-bearer, the further origin of Doljancčević (Doljanci) is from the family of Maleševci.

== Activities during the First Serbian Uprising ==
Aćim Doljanac was a close associate of Karađorđe. On the leader's order, he set fire to some houses in Topčider in 1804, during the Serbian-Turkish negotiations in Zemun. The action was supposed to show the officials from the Habsburg monarchy, who mediated in the mentioned negotiations, how the Turks were committing violence against Serbs and burning their houses. Proto Mateja Nenadović left a note about this event in his memoirs: "There were about ten, empty Bulgarian straw-bale houses in Topčider, whose occupants had fled. When we left Ostružnica, we left Aćim Doljanac behind to set these houses ablaze at a certain time before disappearing." This event took place before Easter 1804.

At the end of August 1806, Doljanac took part in a company led by Pavle Popović, in an attack on the Turks near Tašmajdan. On that occasion, several Turks from Belgrade were killed, but when the Turkish reinforcements arrived from the Varoš Gate, a couple of Serbian insurgents were killed and several were wounded. Aćim was also among the wounded.
