= 2023 World Rowing Championships – PR3 Men's coxless pair =

PR3 Men's coxless pair at the 2023 World Rowing Championships
- Venue: Lake Sava
- Location: Belgrade, Serbia
- Dates: 5 September – 8 September
- Competitors: 4 from 2 nations
- Winning time: 8:30.78

Medalists
gold medal	Ivan Kupriichuk; Andrii Syvykh	Ukraine

The PR3 men's coxless pair competition at the 2023 World Rowing Championships took place at Lake Sava, in Belgrade.

== Schedule ==
The schedule was as follows:

Date	Time	Round
Tuesday 5 September 2023	14:14	Heats
Friday 8 September 2023	15:53	Final

All times are Central European Summer Time (UTC+2)

== Results ==
All boats advanced directly to final.

=== Heat ===
Rank	Rower	Country	Time	Notes
1	Ivan Kupriichuk; Andrii Syvykh	Ukraine	8:12.63	F
2	Daniel Müller; Moritz Hagen	Germany	8:18.54	F

=== Final ===
The final determined the rankings.

Rank	Rower	Country	Time
1st place, gold medalist(s)	Ivan Kupriichuk; Andrii Syvykh	Ukraine	8:30.78
2	Daniel Müller; Moritz Hagen	Germany	8:41.50
