= 2023 World Rowing Championships – Men's lightweight coxless pair =

Men's lightweight coxless pair at the 2023 World Rowing Championships
- Venue: Lake Sava
- Location: Belgrade, Serbia
- Dates: 5 September – 8 September
- Competitors: 8 from 4 nations
- Winning time: 7:34.82

Medalists
gold medal	Francesco Bardelli; Stefano Pinsone	Italy
silver medal	Bence Szabó; Kálmán Furkó	Hungary
bronze medal	Dmitrii Zincenco; Nichita Naumciuc	Moldova

The men's lightweight coxless pair competition at the 2023 World Rowing Championships took place at Lake Sava, in Belgrade.

== Schedule ==
The schedule was as follows:

Date	Time	Round
Tuesday 5 September 2023	14:24	Heats
Friday 8 September 2023	15:05	Final

All times are Central European Summer Time (UTC+2)

== Results ==
=== Preliminary round ===
All boats advanced to the final.

Rank	Rower	Country	Time	Notes
1	Francesco Bardelli; Stefano Pinsone	Italy	7:11.78	F
2	Bence Szabó; Kálmán Furkó	Hungary	7:18.71	F
3	Dmitrii Zincenco; Nichita Naumciuc	Moldova	7:33.65	F
4	Cal Gabriel Gorvy; Daniel Dubitsky	Israel	7:40.78	F

=== Final ===
The final determined the rankings.

Rank	Rower	Country	Time
1st place, gold medalist(s)	Francesco Bardelli; Stefano Pinsone	Italy	7:34.82
2nd place, silver medalist(s)	Bence Szabó; Kálmán Furkó	Hungary	7:40.23
3rd place, bronze medalist(s)	Dmitrii Zincenco; Nichita Naumciuc	Moldova	7:57.24
4	Cal Gabriel Gorvy; Daniel Dubitsky	Israel	7:59.17
