= 2023 World Rowing Championships – Women's lightweight coxless pair =

Women's lightweight coxless pair at the 2023 World Rowing Championships
- Venue: Lake Sava
- Location: Belgrade, Serbia
- Dates: 5 September – 8 September
- Competitors: 6 from 3 nations
- Winning time: 8:33.13

Medalists
gold medal	Serena Mossi; Elisa Grisoni	Italy
silver medal	Luise Münchi; Eva Hohoff	Germany

The women's lightweight coxless pair competition at the 2023 World Rowing Championships took place at Lake Sava, in Belgrade.

== Schedule ==
The schedule was as follows:

Date	Time	Round
Tuesday 5 September 2023	10:50	Preliminary
Friday 8 September 2023	15:21	Final

All times are Central European Summer Time (UTC+2)

== Results ==
=== Heat ===
All boats advanced directly to Final.

Rank	Rower	Country	Time	Notes
1	Serena Mossi; Elisa Grisoni	Italy	7:25.66	FA
2	Luise Münchi; Eva Hohoff	Germany	7:37.71	FA
3	Solveig Imsdahl; Elaine Tierney	United States	7:42.14	FA

=== Final ===
The final determined the rankings.

Rank	Rower	Country	Time
1st place, gold medalist(s)	Serena Mossi; Elisa Grisoni	Italy	8:33.13
2nd place, silver medalist(s)	Luise Münchi; Eva Hohoff	Germany	8:40.64
3	Solveig Imsdahl; Elaine Tierney	United States	8:51.84
