= Ostružnica =

Ostružnica Остружница
- Suburban settlement
- Location within Belgrade
- Coordinates: 44°43′25″N 20°19′05″E
- Country: Serbia
- Region: Belgrade
- Municipality: Čukarica

Area
  - Total: 12.79 km^{2} (4.94 sq mi)

Population (2011)
  - Total: 4,218
  - Density: 329.8/km^{2} (854.1/sq mi)
- Time zone: UTC+1 (CET)
  - Summer (DST): UTC+2 (CEST)
- Area code: +381(0)11
- Car plates: BG

Ostružnica (Serbian Cyrillic: Остружница) is a suburban settlement of Belgrade, Serbia, in the municipality of Čukarica. It has a population of 4,218 people (2011).

== Geography ==
Ostružnica is located on the right bank of the Sava river, at the mouth of the Ostružnička reka, 14 km southwest of Belgrade, south of the Ada Ciganlija island.

== History ==
Area of Ostružnica was a location of the Long Bridge, the first permanent bridge in Belgrade's history. As the opposing, Syrmian side across the Sava was a vast marsh at the time (modern New Belgrade), the bridge didn't stop at the bank but continued for some length above the swamp. Because of that, the people also called it the Bridge above the marsh (Most preko močvare). The bridge was built by the Austrians to help them conquer Belgrade from the Ottomans during the 1688 Siege of Belgrade. According to the records, a seasoned Belgrade master craftsman Đorđević "in only one month, with the help of his 400 workers, built the Long Bridge, using 2,000 tree trunks, 1,100 wooden piles, 15,500 bundles of palings and 12,000 palisade pickets." Right next to it, bit closer to the island of Ada Ciganlija, the Austrians constructed another, classical pontoon bridge, which "leaned on the Long Bridge".

During the First Serbian Uprising, Karađorđe, the leader of the rebellion, summoned the very first national assembly of Serbia in Ostružnica 24–28 April 1804.

Doljani is a former settlement that was located in the upper part of the Doljanski potok stream, between the villages of Velika Moštanica, Meljak and Sremčica, just south of today's Ostružnica. It is widely held that Doljani was depopulated during the First Serbian Uprising, by Karađorđe due to the plague; Aćim Doljanac, Karađorđe's close cooperator and progenitor of the Doljančević family, moved to Ostružnica at that time.

== Economy and infrastructure ==
Ostružnica has its own train station on Belgrade's internal freight railway Batajnica–Surčin–Ostružnica–Železnik–Resnik, as the Sava is crossed by the railway bridge at Ostružnica. It is connected to the Belgrade's major freight train station and the Belgrade marshalling yard in Makiš.

A new Ostružnica road bridge, in the final stages of construction, was bombed during NATO air attacks on Yugoslavia in 1999 and wasn't finished until 2005. It represents one of the major sections of the Belgrade bypass.

A small neighborhood of Tarolit, named after the former factory, is located at the exit from Ostružnica in the Umka direction. Situated on the rim of the Sava's river bed, between the water and the Old Obrenovac Road, it is regularly flooded during the Sava's high water levels. In February 2022, it was announced that the residents will be resettled to other parts of Ostružnica.

The Church of Saint Nicholas was built in 1833, as a donation of the ruling Prince Miloš Obrenović. It was built on the top of the hill where the first national assembly was held in 1804. The church was declared a cultural monument in 1969.

== Demographics ==
Ostružnica is classified as an urban settlement, with a fluctuating population count:

- 1921: 1,497
- 1961: 3,871
- 1971: 4,011
- 1981: 4,060
- 1991: 3,628
- 2002: 3,929
- 2011: 4,218

== Sources ==
- Lukić, Nenad M. (2024). "Милош, Вићентије и Никола Станковић, капетани и кнезови из Остружнице" (PDF). ГОДИШЊАК. LXIX‒LXX. Музеј града Београда.
- Lukić, Nenad M. (2016). "ЧУКАРИЦА 1840−1900, НАСТАНАК И РАЗВОЈ". Наслеђе. 17: 187–206.
- Nikolić, Rista T. (1903). "Околина Београда". Srpski etnografski zbornik. V. Srpska kraljevska akademija.
- Mala Prosvetina Enciklopedija, Third edition (1985); Prosveta; ISBN 86-07-00001-2
- Jovan Đ. Marković (1990): Enciklopedijski geografski leksikon Jugoslavije; Svjetlost-Sarajevo; ISBN 86-01-02651-6
