= Long Bridge, Belgrade =

Bridge in Belgrade, Serbia

Long Bridge
- Coordinates: 44°49′17″N 20°26′42″E
- Crosses: Sava
- Locale: Belgrade
- Official name: Дуги мост Dugi most

History
- Opened: 1688
- Closed: 1691?

The Long Bridge (Serbian: Дуги мост / Dugi most) was the first permanent bridge in Belgrade. It was built in 1688, spanning across the Sava river.

== History ==
The Greek historian Zosimus mentions the bridge in Belgrade (at that time, Singidunum) already in the 5th century, which is the oldest historical mention of any bridges in the city. Other historical records observe other bridges, like in 1521, 1595 or 1717, but they were all temporary, pontoon bridges, constructed solely for the purpose of conquering the city during the numerous battles and sieges of Belgrade in history.

== Location ==
The bridge was constructed further to the south from the city, near the village of Ostružnica on Šumadija side of the river. As the Syrmian side across the Sava was a vast marsh at the time (modern New Belgrade), the bridge didn't stop at the bank but continued for some length above the swamp. Because of that, the people also called it the Bridge above the marsh (Most preko močvare).

== Construction ==
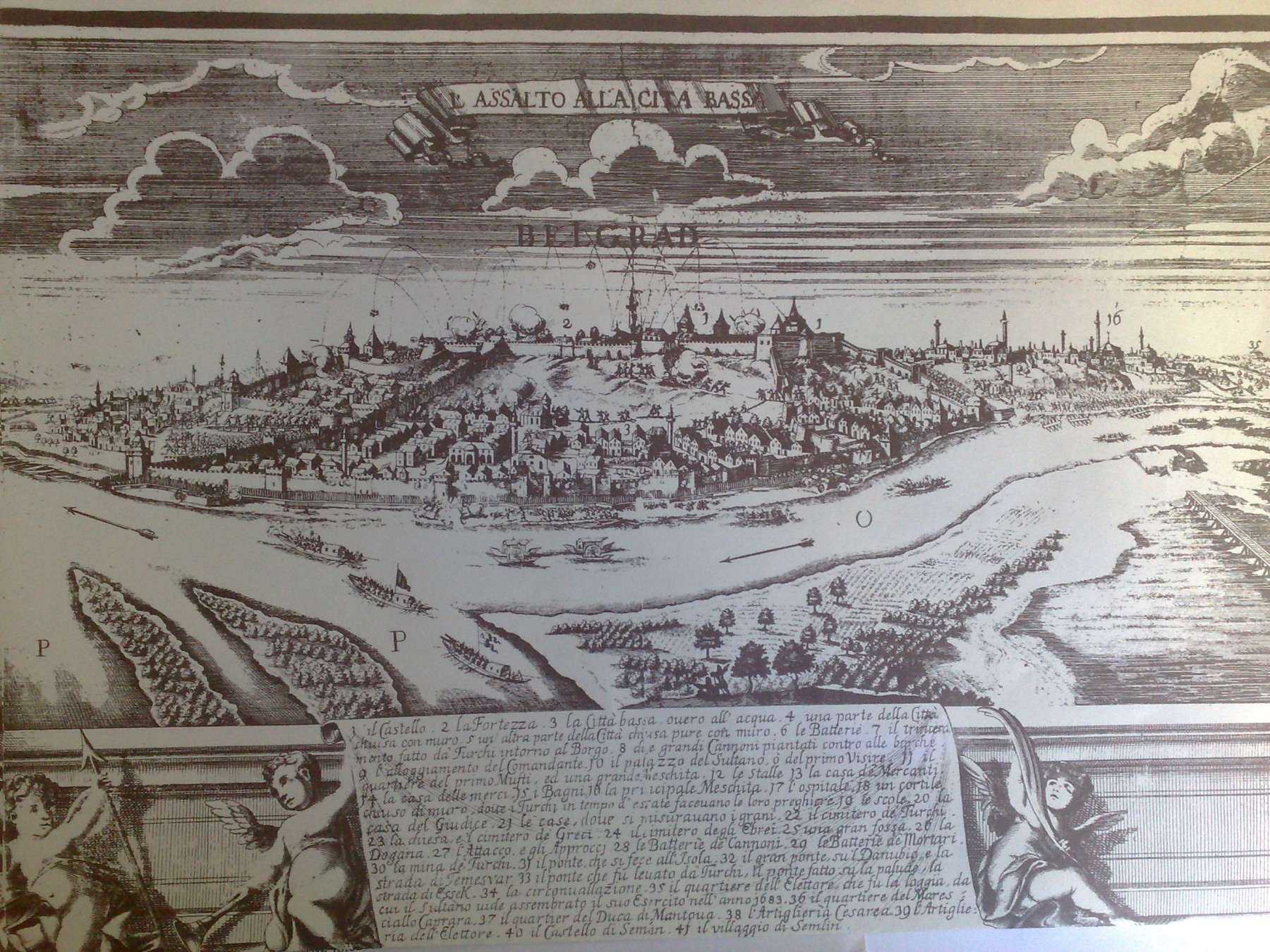
1688 Siege of Belgrade

Just like all the previous temporary bridges, the Long Bridge was also built by the Austrians to help them conquer Belgrade from the Ottomans during the 1688 Siege of Belgrade. According to the records, a seasoned Belgrade master craftsman Đorđević "in only one month, with the help of his 400 workers, built the Long Bridge, using 2,000 tree trunks, 1,100 wooden piles, 15,500 bundles of palings and 12,000 palisade pickets."

== Demolition ==
If not before, the bridge had to be demolished by 1691 when the Ottomans reconquered Belgrade.

== Importance ==
The Long Bridge is the first permanent bridge in Belgrade history. Right next to it, bit closer to the island of Ada Ciganlija, the Austrians constructed another, classical pontoon bridge, which "leaned on the Long Bridge". Maps show another pontoon bridge, on the boats, directly connecting the road from Zemun to the Belgrade Fortress.
