= Doljani, Serbia =

Coordinates: 43°7′N 20°22′E

Doljani Дољани
- Village (Selo)
- Interactive map of Doljani
- Country: Serbia
- Municipality: Novi Pazar
- Time zone: UTC+1 (CET)
  - Summer (DST): UTC+2 (CEST)

Doljani is a village situated in Novi Pazar municipality in Serbia.
