= Ada Ciganlija =

Island in Serbia

Native name: Ада Циганлија
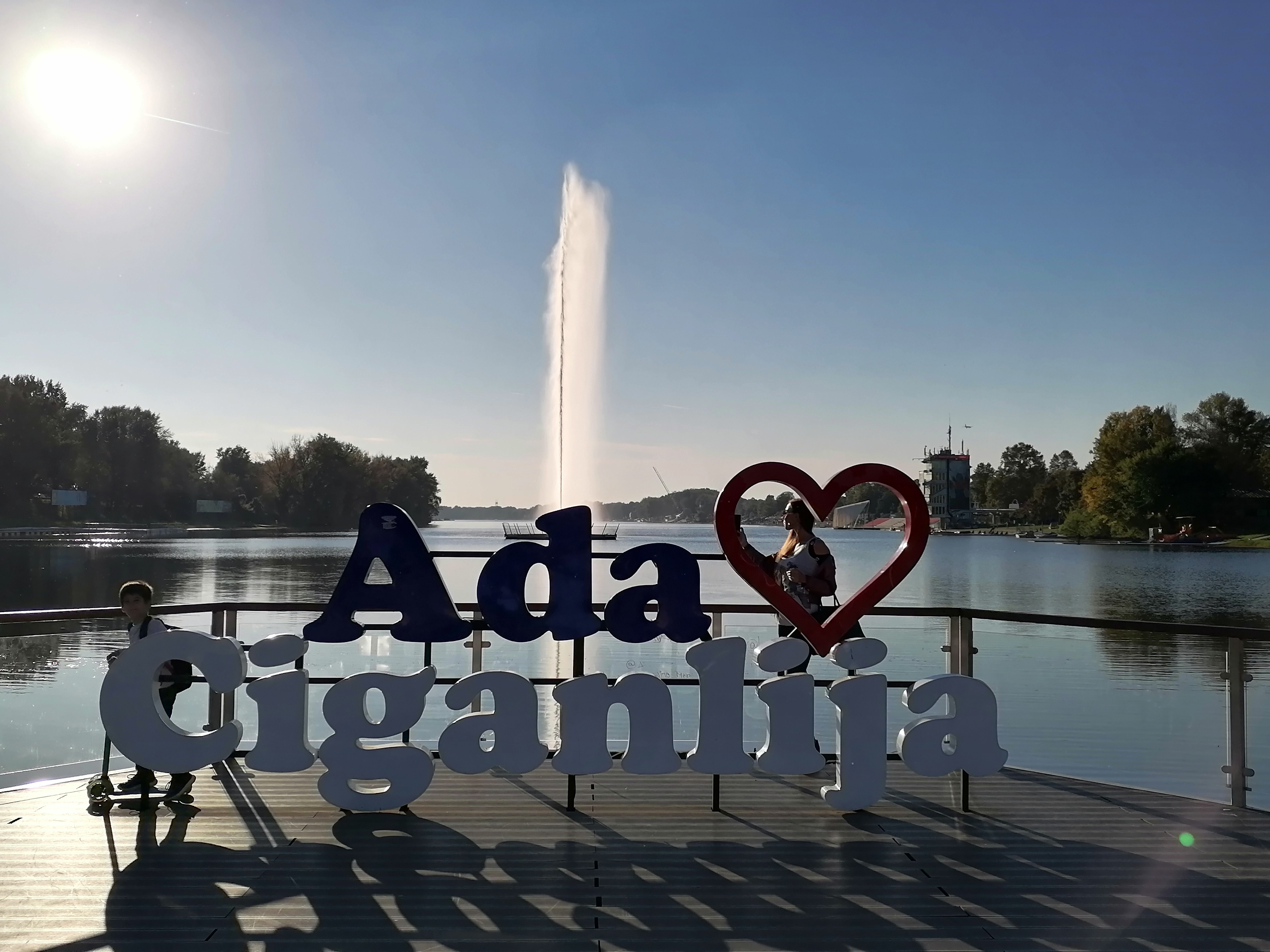
- Ada Ciganlija

- Location within Belgrade

Geography
- Location: Belgrade
- Coordinates: 44°47′N 20°24′E
- Area: 8 km^{2} (3.1 sq mi)
- Length: 6.3 km (3.91 mi)
- Width: 0.7 km (0.43 mi)

Administration
- Serbia

Additional information
- Official website: www.adaciganlija.rs

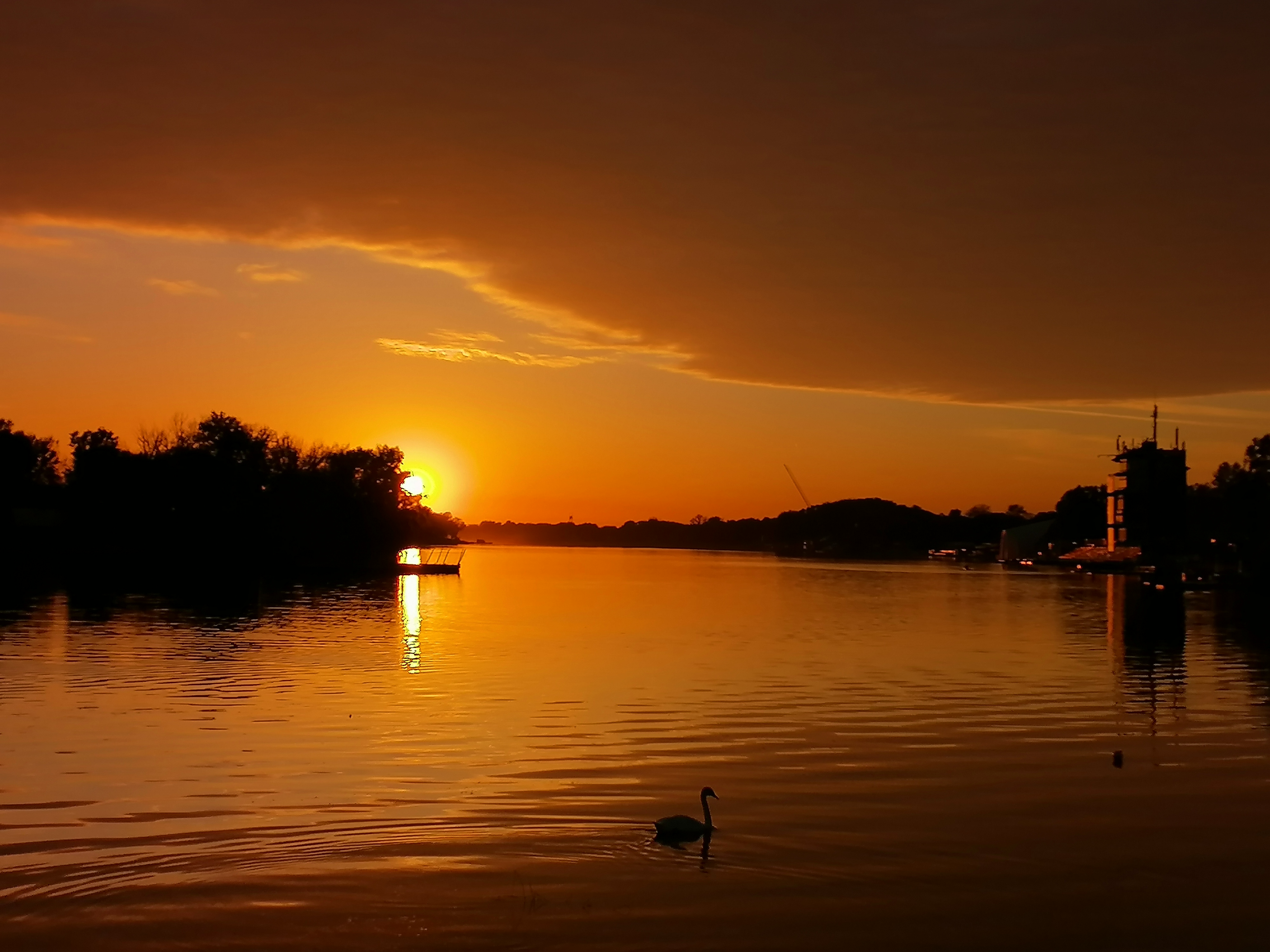
Ada Ciganlija

Ada Ciganlija (Serbian Cyrillic: Ада Циганлија, pronounced [ˈǎːda tsiˈɡǎnlija]), colloquially shortened to Ada, is a river island that has artificially been turned into a peninsula, located in the Sava River's course through central Belgrade, Serbia. The name can also refer to the adjoining artificial Lake Sava and its beach. To take advantage of its central location, over the past few decades, it was turned into an immensely popular recreational zone, most notable for its beaches and sports facilities, which, during summer seasons, can have over 100,000 visitors daily and up to 300,000 visitors over the weekend. Owing to this popularity, Ada Ciganlija has been commonly nicknamed "More Beograda" ('Belgrade's Sea'), which was officially accepted as an advertising slogan in 2008, stylised as More BeogrADA.

== Location ==
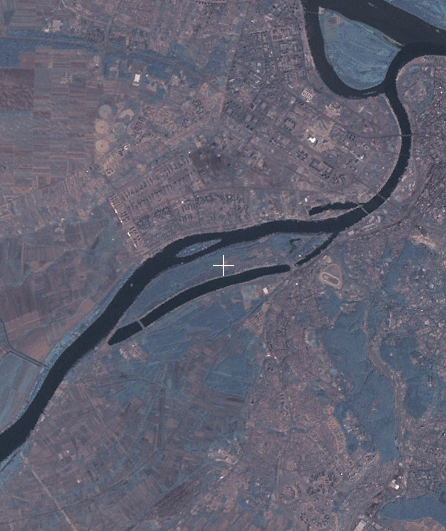
Satellite view on Ada Ciganlija

Ada Ciganlija is located on the southern bank of the Sava River, 4 km from its mouth, and entirely belongs to Belgrade's municipality of Čukarica. Its eastern tip roughly borders the urban neighborhood of Senjak on the west (across an inlet called Čukarica Bay), and the body of the peninsula borders the neighborhoods of Čukarica and Makiš (both across Lake Sava). Across the river, Ada Ciganlija borders Novi Beograd (specifically residential blocks and the urban neighborhoods of Savski Nasip) and another artificial peninsula called Mala Ciganlija ("Little Ciganlija"). Between Ada Ciganlija and Novi Beograd lies Ada Međica, a wholly insulated river island.

== Geography ==
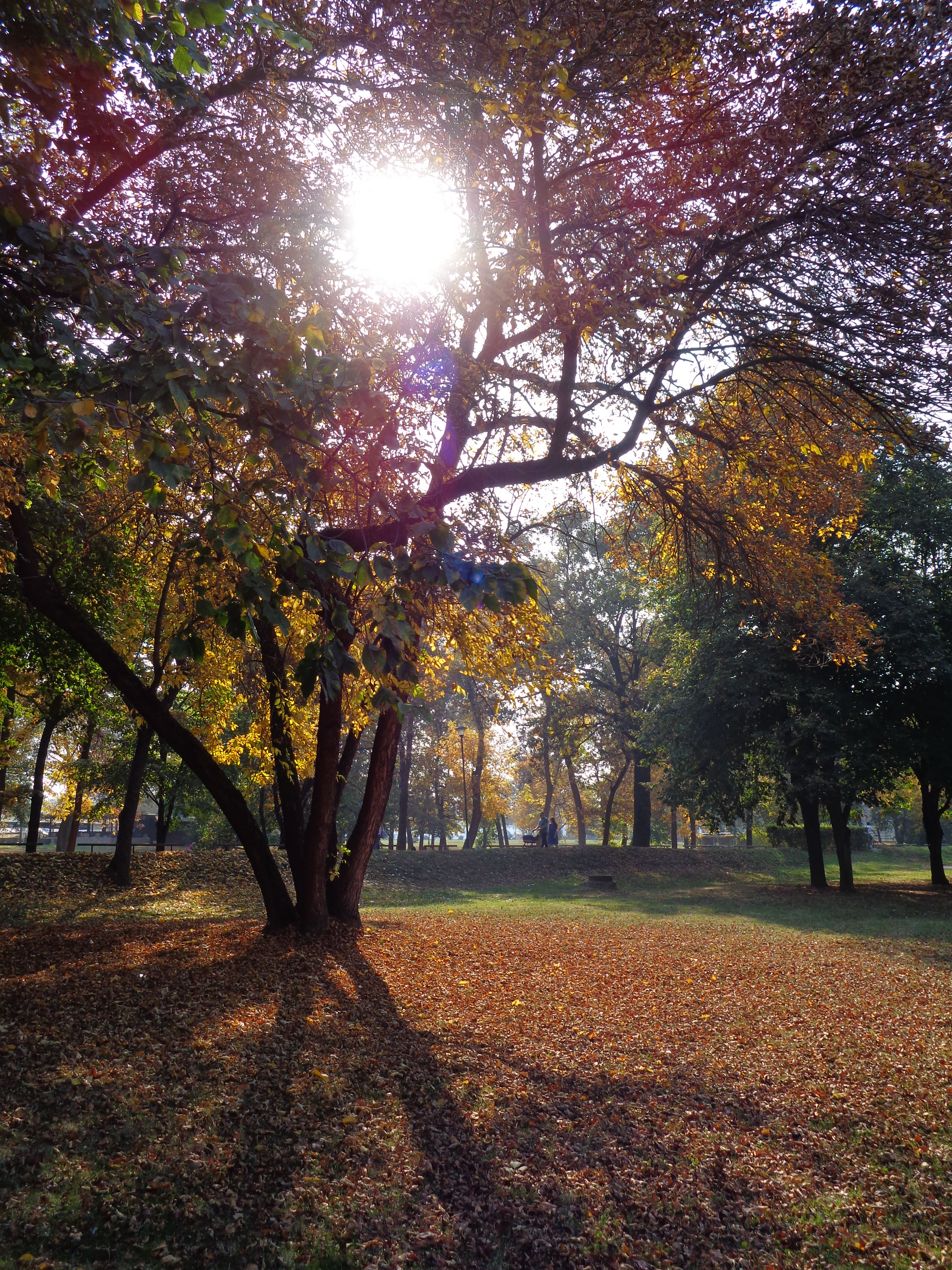

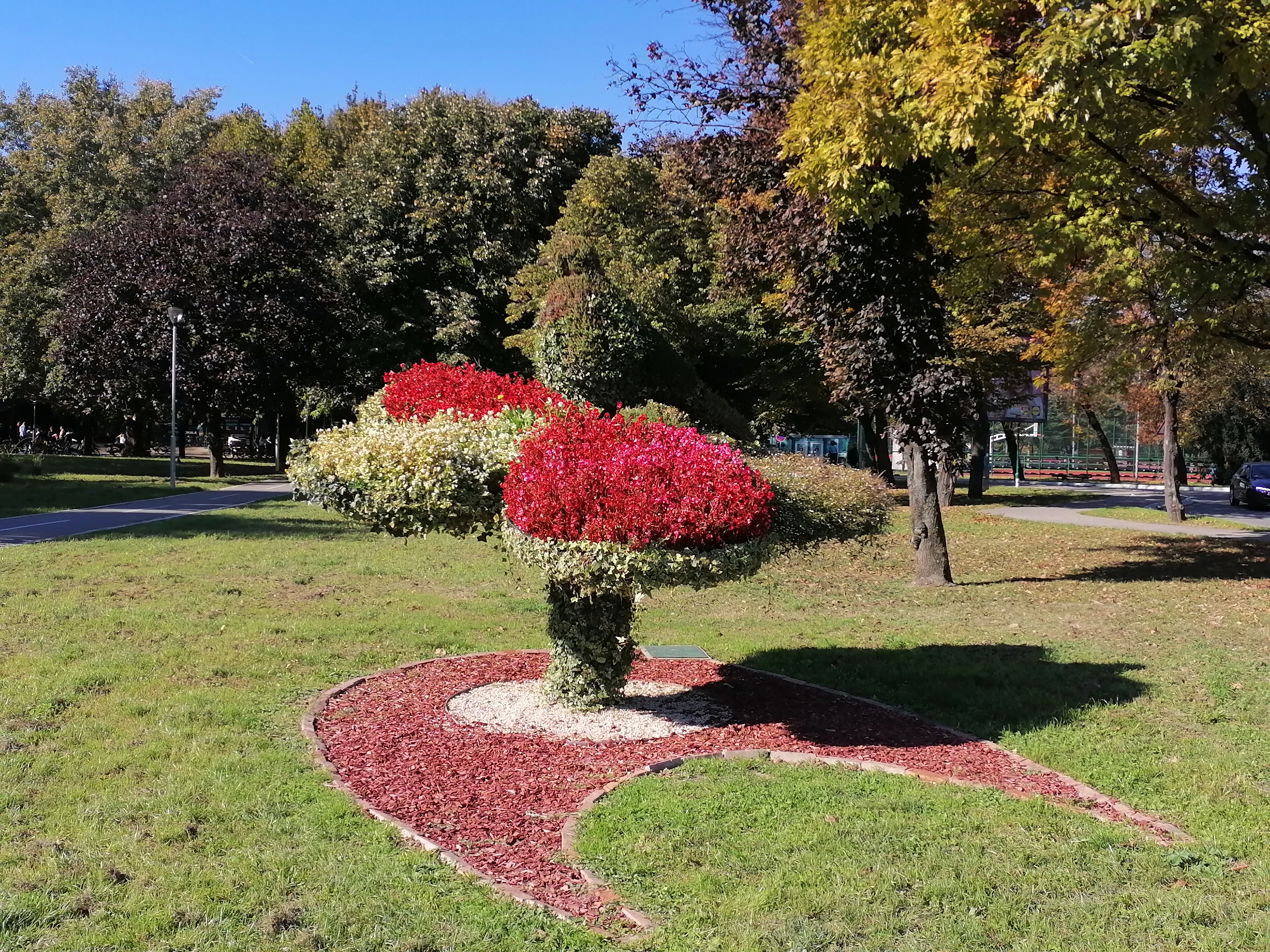

Formerly an island, Ada Ciganlija is now an elongated peninsula, stretching for 6 km from west to east and 700 m from north to south at its widest, and covering an area of 2.7 km^{2}. The entire Ada Ciganlija ecological complex, which stretches into the municipality of Novi Beograd, covers an area of 8 km^{2}, including the islands of Ada Ciganlija and Ada Međica, waterways between the two Adas and Lake Sava, and some of Makiš itself. Lake Sava, formerly a branch of the Sava, was turned into a lake with two dams, while the remaining section on the northeast was turned into Čukarica Bay. There is another small lake on Ada Ciganlija itself, known as Ada Safari.

Thanks to the combination of factors, Ada Ciganlija is privileged with a microclimate. Situated between a river, an artificial flowing lake, various islands, and a heavily wooded area, air humidity is heightened compared to the rest of the city, helping to nullify Belgrade's high temperatures during summer.

=== Hydrology ===
==== Lake Sava ====
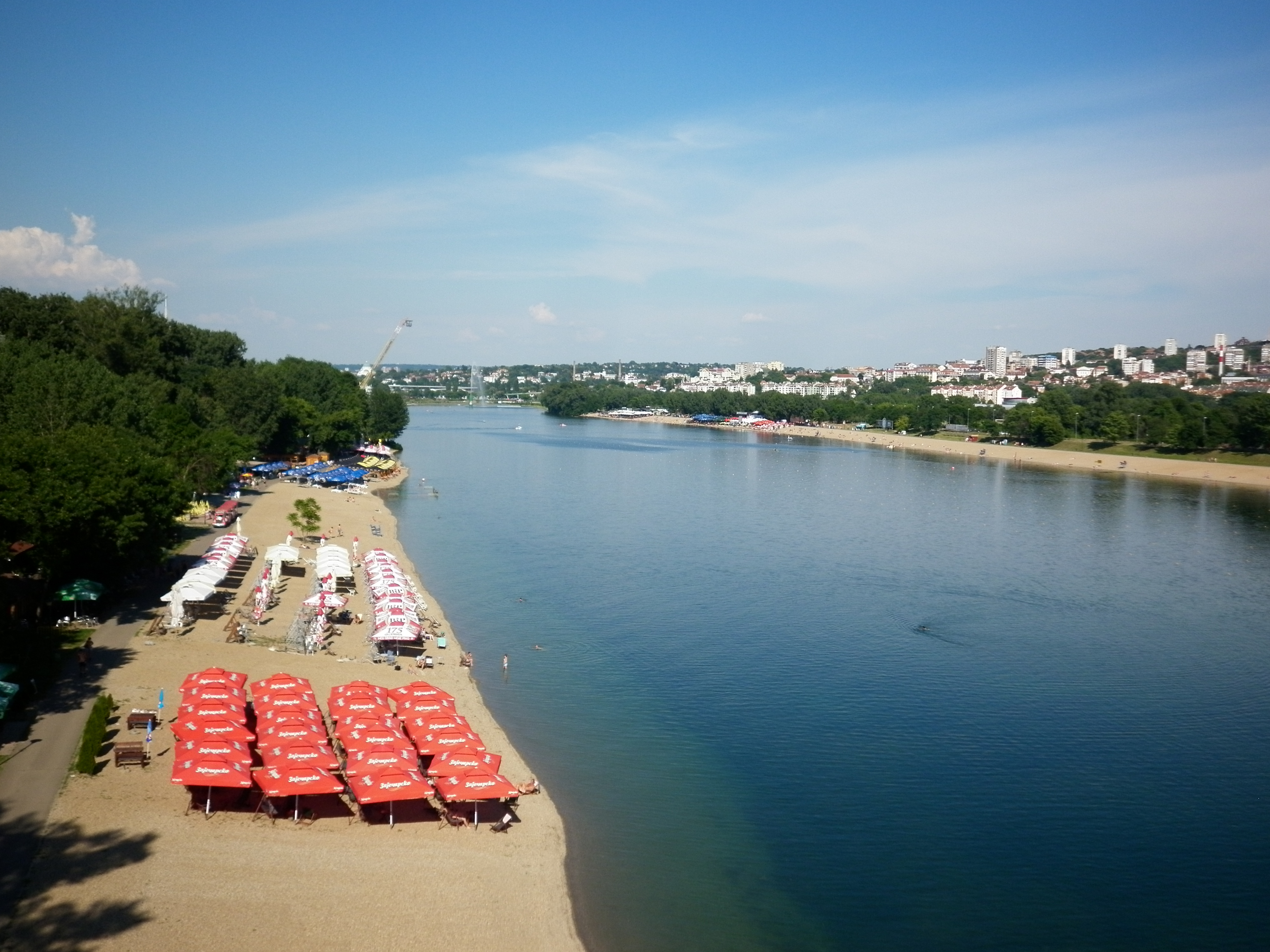
Ada Ciganlija and Lake Sava

Lake Sava
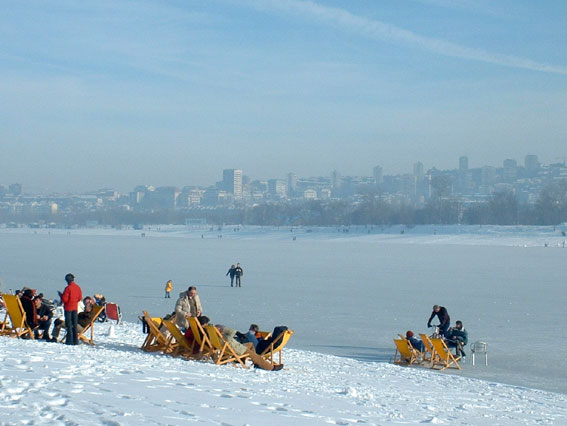
- Lake Sava in winter

- Location within Belgrade
- Location: Belgrade, Serbia
- Coordinates: 44°47′21″N 20°24′8″E
- Type: artificial
- Primary inflows: Sava
- Primary outflows: Sava
- Basin countries: Serbia
- Max. length: 4.2 km (2.6 mi)
- Max. width: 200 m (660 ft)
- Surface area: 0.86 km^{2} (0.33 sq mi)
- Average depth: 4 m (13 ft)
- Max. depth: 14 m (46 ft)
- Shore length^{1}: 9 km (5.6 mi)
- Surface elevation: 78 m (256 ft)
- Islands: none
- Settlements: Belgrade
- ^{1} Shore length is not a well-defined measure.

Lake Sava (Serbian: Савско језеро, Savsko jezero), often also referred to as Ada, was created from the right arm of the Sava with the building of two dams near the northern and southern tips of the island in 1967. The lake is 4.2 km (2.6 mi) long, has an average width of 200 m (660 ft) and is 4 to 6 m (13 to 20 ft) deep. It covers and area of 0.86 km^{2} (0.33 sq mi) and is 78 m (256 ft) above sea level, one of the lowest areas of Belgrade. 7 km (4.3 mi) of its shores on both sides have been transformed into a gravel beach. The water regularly reaches 24 °C (75 °F) during summer.

Both dams allow water to flow through tubes and pumps. This way, the main body of the lake is connected to the smaller body of water on the southwest, which is itself separated from the river by the third dam. This mini "buffer" lake called Taložnik ("depository") is used as a purifier for the waters of both Lake Sava and city waterworks, which also use this water. Filtered water is constantly being pumped into the lake while on the northeast, the water is pumped out by electrically powered pumps through another dam into Čukarica Bay. In this way, an artificial flow of water through the lake is created. Because the water is also used for drinking, sanitation and environmental protection of the lake are imperative and the lake is under rigorous environmental protection. Weeds are groomed on the lake's bottom to purify the water by bonding phosphorus, nitrogen and dirt. Use of motorboats is strictly prohibited in the lake and dogs are not allowed on the beach.

Wildlife in the lake mostly consists of the fish species which were introduced since the 1950s. The most common fish in the lake are the introduced silver carp and grass carp, but large autochthonous wels catfish, weighing over 100 kg (220 lb), can also be found, causing concern among the swimmers so the authorities issued a statement that they are harmless. In March 2019, a 2 m (6 ft 7 in) long catfish was caught in the lake. Catfish of this size is a rarity and, as required by the law, it was returned in to the lake. Other catfishes of this size were reported by the divers in previous years, but they lay lazily on the bottom of the lake, not swimming to the surface.

There are 20 to 25 fish species in the lake, including the autochthonous carp, northern pike, zander, common bream, asp and European perch, and the imported, and highly invasive brown bullhead, Prussian carp and pumpkinseed. There are also crayfish and crabs, and since the 2010s, the red-eared slider inhabits the lake, too, probably being released in the lake by the owners who kept them as pets.

The freshwater jellyfish Craspedacusta sowerbyi was discovered in 2008, garnering much attention for the lake. These anthomedusae begin their life as polyps and develop into jellyfish only if conditions, such as purity and water temperature over 25 °C, are right. However, authorities claim that these harmless and almost invisible jellyfish (they are only 3 mm (0.12 in) to 5 mm (0.20 in) wide, bell is 12 mm (0.47 in) in diameter and have no sting cells) actually have been present in the lake for over 20 years. The first specimens were discovered in 1994 and they can also be found in the Danube. They live only for several days.

==== Ada Safari ====
Ada Safari (Serbian: Ада Сафари) is a small, irregularly shaped lake on the northern tip of Ada Ciganlija, primarily used for fishing. In the late 1960s, the hole was formed as the sand was dug to construct the permanent embankment which connected Ada Ciganlija to the mainland, turning it into the peninsula by 1974.

It was the last remaining marshy area during the transformation Ada Ciganlija, infested by undergrowth and reeds, until its conversion into a lake in 1994, 235 m (771 ft) long, with an area of 6 ha (15 acres). It was officially opened in 1995. The water pumps are used to fill the lake, bringing water from the Sava Lake. Rare species of fish were introduced in order to create a fishing resort, which now consists of 300 numbered fishing seats around the lake with an obligatory special permit for fishing. Fish species include common carp, grass carp, crucian carp, wels catfish, Prussian carp, zander and tench, which is rare in Serbia. Fish are mostly released back into the lake as fishermen can keep their catch in case if the fish is lighter than 10 kg (22 lb), if they pay extra and if it is not a tench, which is protected by the law.

Some animals roam freely in the area, like rabbits, ducks, geese and swans. A small zoo has been built next to the lake, chiefly containing swamp birds, as well as more exotic animals such as peacocks, pheasants and pygmy goats. There is also a restaurant on the shore and a typical Serbian 18th century house from Šumadija which was deconstructed from the Central Serbia and transferred here. The house was originally built around 1735 in the village of Junkovac, near Topola. There is also a "Magical forest", an area for the kids with reproductions of the fairytale characters: Evil Witch, Cinderella, Wolf and the Three Little Pigs, Little Red Riding Hood, the Scarecrow and the Tin Man, etc. There is a small stream over which the bridge and the cross, both made from timber, have been constructed. Fish are especially prepared for the winter in the process of "winter carp bathing". In the second week of November each year, fish (up to 9 tonnes in total) are taken from the lake to the shore by the professional fishermen. The lake is then emptied and the largest fish specimens are "bathed" in the small bathtubs with the water mixed with the medical, healing ingredients.

In 2022, new city administration headed by mayor Aleksandar Šapić included relocation of the Belgrade Zoo from the Belgrade Fortress in the city's urban plan. In February 2023, Šapić announced relocation of the zoo to Ada Safari. This would also include relocation of the Partizan settlement. The relocation was planned to last several years. Šapić added that the "political decision was made to handle this", and, if everything goes by the plan, the relocation might be finished in three years.

The new zoo will be double in size, from 7 ha (17 acres) to 14 ha (35 acres). In order to ease the access to the zoo on an island, city will push the construction of the pedestrian bridge and revitalize the project of gondola lift from New Belgrade to Košutnjak, via Ada. Public and expert's backlash against the project was massive, especially regarding hastiness, arbitration, irrelevance, legality and selected location. Public speculated that the residents of the newly built affluent K-Distrikt residential complex across the zoo are bothered by the smell, or that some more lucrative structures might be built instead of the zoo on such exceptional location. Additionally, this area of Ada is a floodplain with high level of underground waters, and is an area under sanitary protection.

Šapić then back-pedaled a bit, stating that this is just a "political idea" which is not hastily made, that only now analyses and surveys will be done to check the viability, that nothing will be built instead of the zoo but the fortress will be conserved, and that there is no set time frame for the project.

==== Čukarica Bay ====
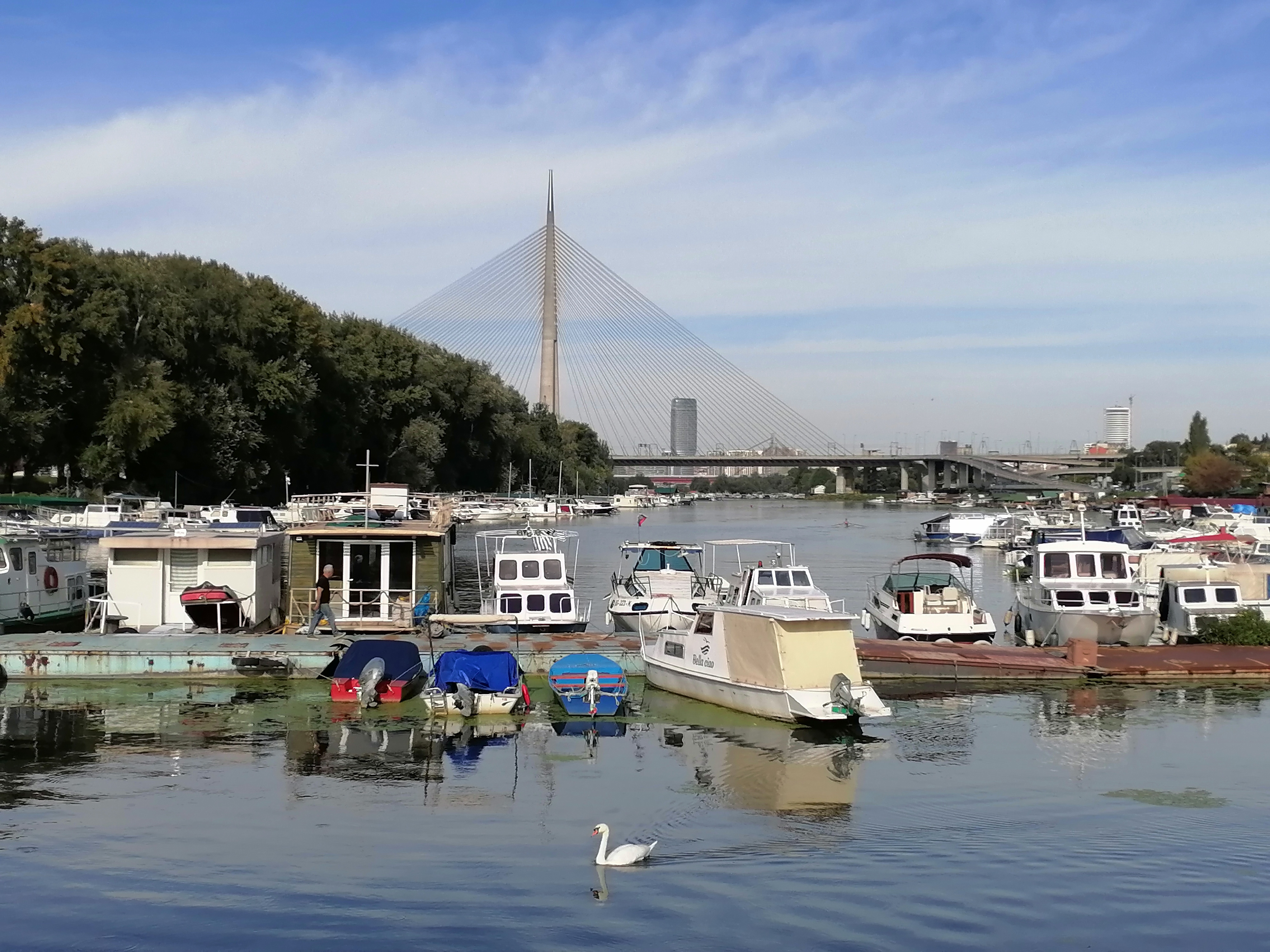

The arm of the Sava river which separated the island from the mainland was called Čukarica Arm (Чукарички рукавац). Serbian Shipping Society, which was founded in 1890, decided to use the arm as the zimovnik, or winter shelter for ships and boats. Upstream from Čukarica, at the time suburban village of Belgrade, the Society dammed the arm with slanted, shackled, thick triangular piles, called pilotne. Facing the stream, they stopped the ice which would then elevate itself slab by slab until it reaches over the top of the piles and breaks into pieces. The stream would then take smaller pieces next to the docked ships. In the case of complete freezing of the river, the tugboats were deployed, with crew members being armed with axes, grappling hooks and dynamite.

As the Society built and kept zimovnik on its own, without state help, they charged the use of the object. In the arm's central section, on Čukarica bank, the first shipbuilding facility in Serbia was opened. Though the engines had to be acquired abroad, the shipyard was producing smaller and medium-sized steamboats. Known as the Čukarica Shipyard (Čukarička brodarnica), it also repaired all Serbian ships and continuously produced iron-made barges of all kinds and sizes for Serbian and Bulgarian markets.

When Ada was connected to the mainland via the embankments in 1967, northern section of the arm was transformed into the Čukarica Bay (Чукарички залив), though the previous name survived, too. The arm is elongated in the southwest–northeast direction, bounded by the northern tip of Ada Ciganlija, the embankment and the right bank of the Sava (neighborhoods of Careva Ćuprija and southern stretch of Bara Venecija, formerly known as Šest Topola). This is where the Topčiderka river flows into the Sava. Near the connection point with the main flow of the Sava, the bay is today crossed by the Ada Bridge.

The bay is used for the sports and leisure activities as the kayaking clubs were located in it, so as the marina for small boats, while the banks are encircled with the bicycle paths. The bay is 1.3 km (0.81 mi) long and 120 to 160 m (390 to 520 ft) wide. Surface of the bay itself is 16 ha (40 acres), but the area which city administration included in the bay locality includes and additional 5.8 ha (14 acres) of aquatorium and 20.8 ha (51 acres) of the surrounding land. In March 2018 city announced an urban design competition for the adaptation of the total bay area (42.6 ha (105 acres)). The forested area on the mainland, at the entrance into the bay, administratively belongs to the municipality of Savski Venac and covers 3.61 ha (8.9 acres).

Since the early 1980s there is a constant ecological problem due to the massive pollution of the bay as a result of the polluted waters of the Topčiderka river. The garbage and highly polluted silt fills the bay and creates shoals. During low-tide, the bay is unusable for the boats in the marina, located in the middle of the bay or for the kayakers of Partizan and Crvena Zvezda who use the bay for practice. The silt is up to 5 m (16 ft) thick, smells bad and is poisonous so the swimming in the bay is forbidden.

In 2011 the estimated amount of garbage sludge in the bay was 120,000 m^{3} (4,200,000 cu ft). The sludge cannot simply be dredged and thrown in the Sava further downstream due to the toxicity. The plan to build a treatment plant on the bank near the Belgrade Fair which would detoxicate the sludge and produce fertilizer from it was scrapped due to the high costs. At the time, the silt is being dredged and vegetation cut just enough to make it navigable for the small boats in the marina. The bay was partially dredged in 2016.

The pollution of the bay continued, including two atmospheric precipitation collectors which overspill into the bay, to which the fecal sewage is illegally connected, and the bay was described as the ecological time bomb. In December 2019 the winning project was announced. It includes the transformation of the bay into the artificial whitewater and the proper marina. A project by Aleksandar Nedeljković, named "Flight of the gull" envisions the reconstruction and elevation of all embankments along the bay's banks, turning them into the vertical retaining walls. Pumps for the creation of the whitewater by day, would be used to purify the water by night and prevent the sludge from depositing on the bottom. Proposed name for the marina and sports center is "Whitewater Arena". However, this project, just like some others from the competition (conducting the Topčiderka directly into the main Sava riverbed by the pipes) does not tackle the problem of the already existing sludge deposits or the toxicity of the waste. Also, it was outright labeled as way too expensive, even by its authors (up to €70 million).

An experiment was conducted when the water from the bay and river was pumped into the special pools in the nursery gardens of the state company for the forest management "Srbijašume". The water was treated by various selected plants, in the process called phytoremediation, and the quality of the water improved from the fifth to the second category, but the technology wasn't pursued any further. Instead, in 2019 and 2020, it was applied at the Lake Trešnja, in the suburb of Ripanj, where it proved to be highly successful in reducing pollutants in the water. After several months of bad smell which spread from the bay, the dredging began in November 2020. Until February 2021, the 40,000 m^{3} (1,400,000 cu ft) was removed, thus creating a channel to allow the water to flow out of the bay into the river. The dredged sludge is spread along the central section of the Danube's flow, upstream from the Pančevo Bridge.

Instead of revitalization, the bay turned out to be polluted more than ever. By April 2021 the water was classified as the lowest, fifth category. The water was anoxic, full of ammonium-nitrogen and orthophosphates. The red wastewater from the sewage also influenced water's organoleptic qualities – changed color, murkiness, strong smell and visible residues of organic matter, but in May city administration announced it inspected the Topčiderka's watershed, founded the polluting factories and closed them, fixing this problem.

=== Wildlife ===
==== Plants ====
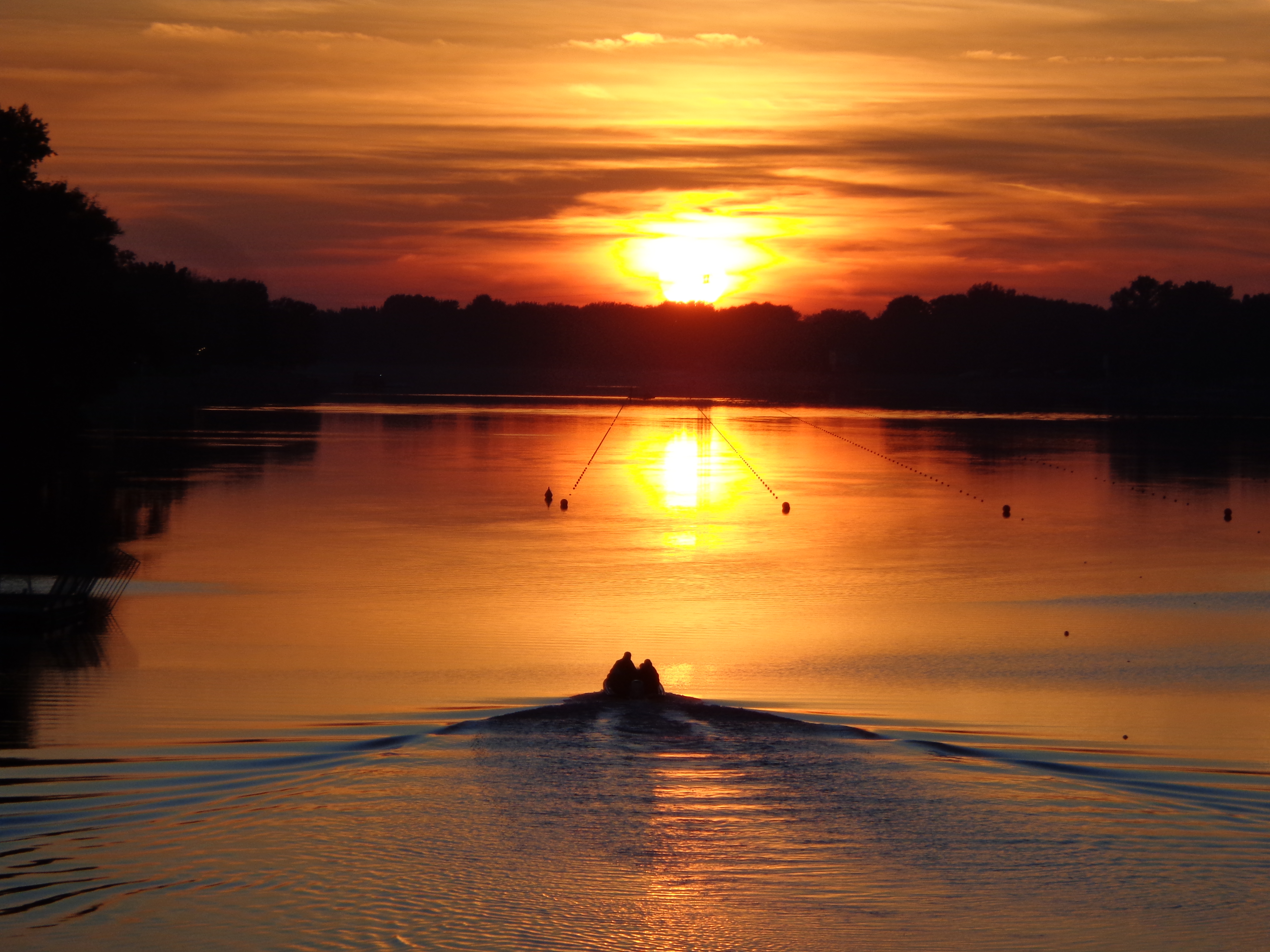

Ada Ciganlija has a unique ecosystem, creating an oasis in the urban area. Most of the peninsula is forested. The original, thick deciduous forest mainly consists of oaks, elms, birches and willows. In the mid 20th century, further planned forestation of Ada Ciganlija included the planting of Northamerican poplars and green ash. In total, some 450 plant species inhabit Ada, including white poplar, black poplar, white willow, pedunculate oak, narrow-leaved ash, Canadian poplar, European white elm, box elder, American ash. In 2010, total forested area covered 1.79 km^{2} (0.69 sq mi), or two thirds of the island. This characteristic of Ada gives its visitors an illusion of being in complete wilderness, aided by the fact that city ambient noise is completely muted by the thick forest.

Most of the forest on the island is protected, including the entire central, northern and western sections. These parts of the peninsula are entirely wild with uncultivated vegetation and very little or no human presence, making it unique compared to other European city islands and peninsulas. Part of the Ada's central forested complex was declared a protected habitat "Fungi of Ada Ciganlija" by the city on 29 November 2013. Apart from the wood fauna characterized for the wet soils, it hosts 250 species of fungi, many of which are listed on Serbian and international lists of rare or endangered species. It is the only known habitat in Serbia of Myriostoma coliforme. Location starts 80 metres (260 ft) away from the lake. The fungi was discovered on the island in 1993, and in 2022 covered 21.25 hectares (52.5 acres).

==== Animals ====
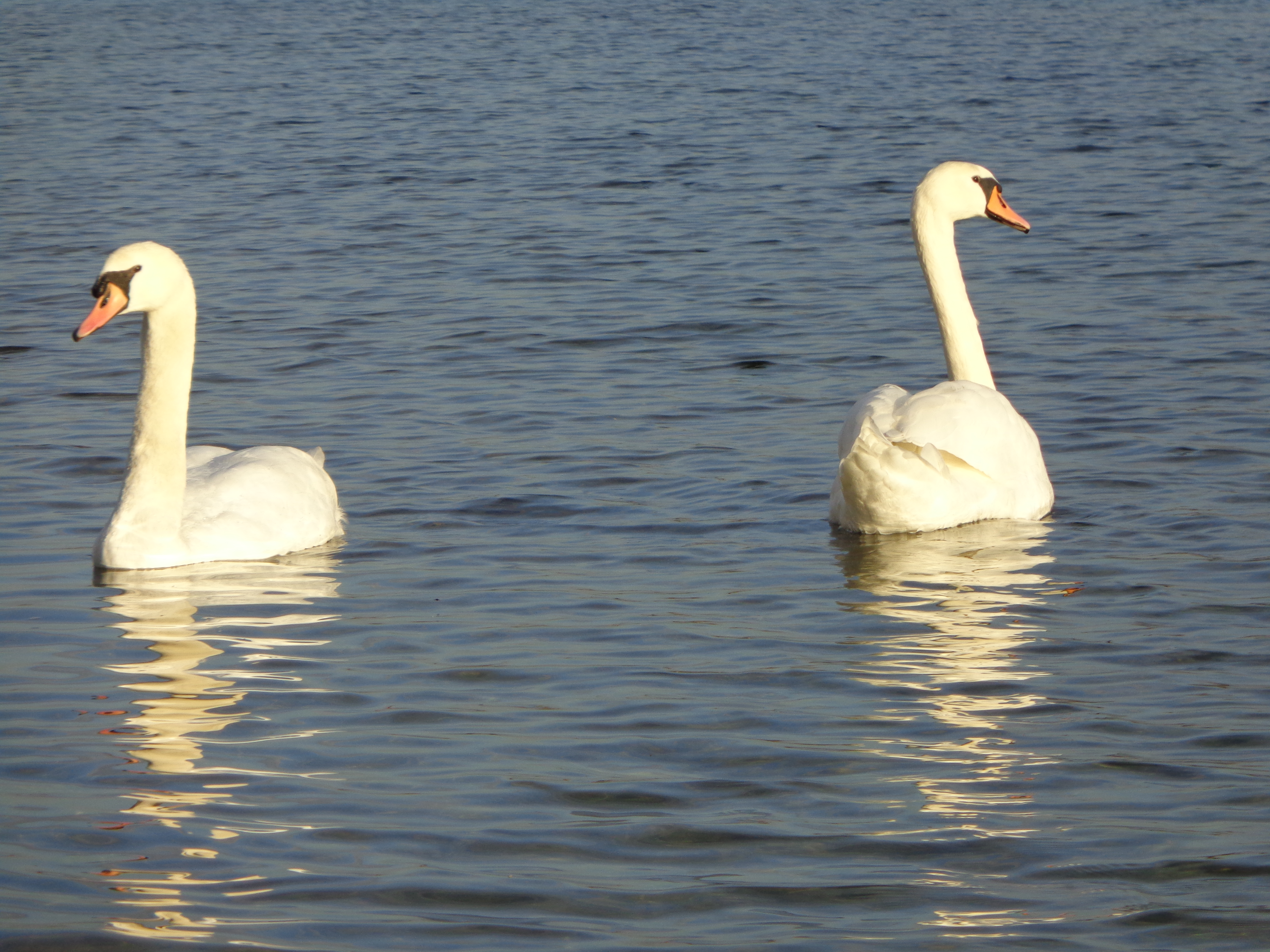
Swans

In terms of fauna, besides having numerous amphibians and 94 species of insects, Ada Ciganlija contains several mammal species, considered special due to the setting of the peninsula in an urban area. Foxes, hares and roe deer inhabit the peninsula. However, with environmentalists warning that the island's biocoenosis has been overly affected, a new population of 60 hares and 100 pheasants was introduced into the ecosystem in 2006.

Bird species include northern lapwings, mallards and pheasants. Common woodland and parkland birds during the nesting season include song thrush, great tit, blue tit, long-tailed tit, Eurasian nuthatch, European green woodpecker, great spotted woodpecker, golden oriole, nightingale, blackcap, common chaffinch, hooded crow, Eurasian magpie, common wood pigeon, feral pigeon, white wagtail and barn swallow.

Unlike other rivers and wetlands in Belgrade, swans rarely visited the lake, including occasional black swans. Starting in September 2020, swans began to arrive at the lake, until several dozens flocked in total, and remained on Ada. The number of swans in Belgrade had been constantly growing since the 2010s, reaching some 600 birds by the winter of 2021. They are mostly mute swans and are quickly adapted: more and more of them becoming sedentary rather than migratory, accustoming to humans who regularly feed them, becoming popular among the residents, and turning into the mascots of the neighborhoods they inhabit.

Ada is also the wintering ground for some threatened migratory birds, most notably the pygmy cormorant which winters in Belgrade in large numbers. Pygmy cormorant inhabited the Pančevački Rit marshland, just north of Belgrade, in the early 20th century, but after that area was drained and urbanized, they disappeared. Several hundreds of birds in the early 1990s began spending winters on the Malo Ratno Ostrvo, in the Danube. When their number exceeded 1,000, they resettled to three new locations: first at the willow grove on the Sava's bank (Belgrade Fair) and then to the area near the tip of Ada and the neighboring Mala Ciganlija. Their number rose every year to 6,750 in 2007/08, but since then is generally reducing and in 2015 it was 3,850 which is still 5,4% of the European and 2% of the world's pygmy cormorant population. There were concerns that the building of the new Ada Bridge in 2008–12 would disturb the habitat, but the birds endured it well. Their habitat was protected by law in 2008. Any destruction, clearing or pruning of the vegetation is forbidden, so as scaring, disturbing or killing of the birds.

In c.1900, the last nests of yellow-legged gull in Serbia were spotted on Ada. The nesting pairs were spotted again in 2021, in the Đerdap Gorge, some 250 kilometres (160 mi) to the east.

In April 2022, plans were announced to declare Ada Ciganlija a protected area, as a landscape of outstanding features, by the end of 2022. It will cover 4.51 square kilometres (1.74 sq mi).

=== Settlements ===
==== Partizan ====
The only settlement on Ada Ciganlija is in its northern section, located behind another dam. It is called Partizan, because of the nearby Partizan Rowing Club. First stilt houses were built right after World War II as the summer houses for the army officers. In 1959 the construction of the proper settlement was suggested, and the first houses were built in 1960. Those were small, serial weekend houses with an area of 12 m^{2} (130 sq ft). Most of the original construction was finished from 1964 to 1966. As the nearby Ada Safari wasn't adapted yet and was a marshland, original settlers, who were from the upper classes, were leaving and instead the workers who migrated from the interior of Serbia settled in. During the various works on Ada Ciganlija, workers would use the houses as tool sheds. Additional boost was an influx of refugees from the Yugoslav Wars since 1991.

City authorities planned to relocate the settlement. During the 2006 European floods, city authorities urged them to move to the mainland from the settlement, which was located almost 8 m (26 ft) below the dam, as the Sava reached a record height of 723 cm (285 in). The wall of the dam, on the brink of collapse, was hastily strengthened and elevated in an effort to prevent catastrophe, but even in these conditions, the populace refused to relocate, claiming the city to just be using the situation to relocate them.

As their families grew, inhabitants expanded the houses. As of 2016 Partizan had some 1,000 inhabitants in 260 houses covering an area of 14 ha (35 acres). By the latest urbanistic plans, the settlement is still to be evacuated as it is built without any permits and is located in the zone of the sanitary protection. In the 2016 plan for the area, city envisioned thermal and outdoor pools, spa center, small hospitality and catering venues, children's playgrounds and outdoor exhibition area.

Announcement of the relocation of the Belgrade Zoo to Ada in February 2023, also included statement of the relocation of the settlement. Despite claims from the city officials that the idea was not made hastily, residents confirmed that already in July 2022 they were approached by the city to move out, but the zoo was not mentioned to them, which they took as a proof that the relocation of the zoo was an ad hoc idea. The residents were reluctant to move and refused compensations offered by the city.

==== Old Bath ====
Close to the northern tip, as the northeastern extension of Partizan settlement, there is an Old Bath "Partizan" (Staro Kupatilo). Since 1983 it has been a location of an artistic colony, occupied by the painters and sculptors. In the 1980s the venue organized many artistic exhibitions. After the 2006 floods a project of reconstruction of the embankment to prevent the flooding was introduced. The embankment, which was to prevent 25 Renney water wells from being flooded, passes right through the bath building which was to be demolished so that this gap in the embankment can be filled. The gap, which is considered the weakest section of the entire embankment system on the island is just 100 m (330 ft) from the Partizan settlement. Next to the building is the parking for the communal vehicles used for the works on Ada. In 2011, the management ordered the artists to move out. As of 2023, the building still stands and serves as an atelier. One of the artists working there was Ratko Vulanović (1941–2023), author of the sculptural composition at the Ada's entrance, called Stone City, or popularly nicknamed Adahenge. The author himself called the sculptural complex Gates of Belgrade (Kapije Beograda).

== History ==
=== Nomenclature ===
The etymology of the name could be Celtic in origin, which probably is the most likely scenario. Some believe that it is derived by some form of the word for Romani (cigani, "gypsies"), attested in 1717 as German: Zigeuner-Insel when it was mentioned as a depopulated village after the Austrian takeover of Belgrade.

An Italian work from 1788 mentions it as Isola degli Zingari. The original toponym might have been singalia, from Celtic Singi (cf. Singidunum). During World War II it was renamed "Serbian Ada" (Srpska ada). The first part of Ada Ciganlija's name, ada, means "river island" in Serbian, a word of Turkish origin (meaning "island"), but in landlocked Serbia it specifically denotes river islands, beside the already existing Serbian word for island, ostrvo. A river island can also be referred to as ostrvo (e.g. Veliko Ratno Ostrvo) but never vice versa.

=== Human history ===
==== Antiquity ====
The remains belonging to the Scordisci, a Celtic tribe which founded Singidunum and Taurunum, the predecessors of Belgrade and Zemun, respectively, were found.

==== 1680s–1914 ====
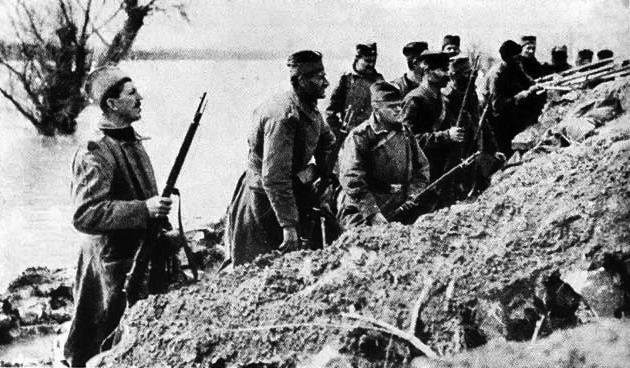
Serbian Army on Ada Ciganlija during World War I

Area of Ostružnica, near the southern tip of Ada Ciganlija, was a location of the Long Bridge, the first permanent bridge in Belgrade's history. As the opposing, Syrmian side across the Sava was a vast marsh at the time (modern New Belgrade), the bridge didn't stop at the bank but continued for some length above the swamp. Because of that, the people also called it the Bridge above the marsh (Most preko močvare). The bridge was built by the Austrians to help them conquer Belgrade from the Ottomans during the 1688 Siege of Belgrade. According to the records, a seasoned Belgrade master craftsman Đorđević "in only one month, with the help of his 400 workers, built the Long Bridge, using 2,000 tree trunks, 1,100 wooden piles, 15,500 bundles of palings and 12,000 palisade pickets." Right next to it, bit closer to Ada Ciganlija, the Austrians constructed another, classical pontoon bridge, which "leaned on the Long Bridge".

The Romani settlement which existed on Ada in the 17th century was displaced from the island to the Sava's right bank, at the mouth of the Topčiderka, before the Austrian occupation of Belgrade from 1717 to 1739. It is not known whether it happened some time before or during the fighting from 1716 to 1718. One map from the Austrian period shows a Romani settlement with 24 houses at the mouth of Topčiderka. Maps also show that the settlement existed during the next Austrian occupation from 1788 to 1791.

When the Austrian army attacked Belgrade in the 18th century, the Ottomans expelled Serbian population from the city, so they temporarily settled on Ada. When Belgrade was liberated by the Serbian rebels in the First Serbian Uprising, leader of the uprising, Karađorđe, granted the island to Mladen Milovanović, the first city chief. After the collapse of the uprising, Milovanović fled to Hungary, but returned in 1813 and unsuccessfully tried to find the gold which he has dug and hidden somewhere on Ada.

Starting in 1821, the state government decided to organize food trade and to check the quantity and quality of the goods imported to the city. The project included introduction of the excise on the goods (in Serbian called trošarina) and setting of a series of excise check points on the roads leading to the city. One of those check points, which all gradually also became known as trošarina, was located next to Topiderka's mouth into the Sava, across the northern tip of Ada. Built in the 1830s and 1840s, it became known as Gospodarska Mehana. It was also a location of the ferry which transported pigs across the Sava into the Austria. This trošarina also functioned as a customs house. On 25 January 1859, when prince Miloš Obrenović and his son Mihailo Obrenović returned to Serbia, they disembarked here. In this period, Ada became a home to ferrymen and numerous smugglers, who operated both ways. The island was sort of a base where the goods was prepacked either for the customs, or was simply smuggled.

The importance of Ada Ciganlija can be traced back to 1821, when it was declared a protected public domain by then Prince of Serbia, Miloš Obrenović. The first official urban plan for Belgrade was drafted in 1867. It was a work of Emilijan Josimović, the first Serbian trained urbanist. He envisioned Ada as the main sports' center of Belgrade and was to be transformed in the "source of fresh air", a term Josimović used for large forests. Neglected since then, Ada came to the spotlight in 1908 when the Society of the Belgrade's journalists organized the first journalists' ball on the lower tip of Ada. In 1911, the first Serbian feature-length motion picture, The Life and Deeds of the Immortal Vožd Karađorđe was filmed on the island.

==== World War I ====
On 28 July 1914, when Austria-Hungary declared war on Serbia, thus triggering the World War I, Serbian forces spread over the island to prevent Austrians to use it as the starting point of entering Serbia. Two major battles ensued, on 22–24 September 1914 and in September 1915. In an effort to exploit the withdrawal of the Serbian army from Syrmia in September 1914, Austro-Hungarian Lieutenant field marshal Kasimir von Lütgendorf decided to conduct the feint attack on the Sava rivers (Ciganlija and Međica) which was to be followed by the landing operation on the Serbian side of the river, conquering of the neighborhoods of Banovo Brdo and Topčider and then, using the western route, entering downtown Belgrade. Attack began on 22 September when the first group of the Austrians attempted to land on the southern tip of Ada. The location was defended from the blockhouse "He-goat", across the river in the Makiš forest. Under strong fire from the blockhouse, Austrians landed more to the north, in the area which Serbs didn't even defend because it was the plain marsh and it was thought that no one will land there. That way, Austrians successfully landed on the island without much resistance. Major Dobrivoje Mojsilović, acting commander of the Ada's defense, engaged the Austrians in an effort to force them to retreat across the river. Serbian reserve was sent to the battle and major Mojsilović, who was wounded, was replaced by major Svetomir Đukić. After several charges which resulted in hand-to-hand combat, Serbs cornered Austrians on the Ada's northern tip. During that time, behind Serbian back, Austria landed more troops from Međica so the Serbian forces ended being encircled. They managed to break out but by that time they were attacked from the flank by the new Austrian forces. Serbs retreated to the easternmost section of the island and started to dig in. On 23 September Austrians conducted three charges on Serbian positions, coming close to only 30 steps from the trenches, but were backed off. As Austrian army had problems with the invasion of western Serbia and attack on Šabac, General Alfred Krauß asked from the commander of the forces for the entire Balkans, Oskar Potiorek, to send him two regiments from Lütgendorf. Potiorek not only agreed but he ordered Lütgendorf to reroute all forces to Šabac. On 24 September the Austrians withdrew. Serbs followed them to make sure it is not another ploy, but the withdrawal was complete. Serbs lost 1 officer and 17 soldiers, while the Austrian fatalities included 4 officers and 310 soldiers.

There was a year long shootout between the two armies, with long calm periods in between, before the German army interfered and began non-stop heavy artillery beating of the island in the late September 1915. Hand-to-hand battle ensued and the German fighters pushed the Serbs from the island. Serbian loses were heavy, turning effectively Ada into an open graveyard, earning a moniker "Island of death".

==== Interbellum ====
During Interbellum, Ada wasn't the most popular recreational area as the major beach area was across its northern tip, in the Gospodarska Mehana section of the Senjak neighborhood. Still, even then, one of major Serbian writers Branislav Nušić, nicknamed it Vodeni cvet (watery flower) because of its beauty.

In 1920 city decided to arrange the Ada as part of the international design competition concerning the arrangement and expansion of Belgrade. Competition was announced in 1921. One of the submitted works, titled Urbs Magna ("Great City"), proposed construction of the large, multi-functional stadium and transformation of the island into the sports park. First facilities of the swimming and rowing clubs on the island were built after that. The Belgrade's first general urban plan, completed in 1924, envisioned the island as an excursion and leisure area. In 1936 city government adopted a new general urban plan which projected Ada as the "sports island".

By the early 1930s, state rowing championships, and Danube States Rowing Championship have been held at Ada Ciganlija. The 1932 European Rowing Championships was held 2–4 September 1932 at the island. A straight, 2,000 metres (6,600 ft) long track was arranged. Hangars and stands ("water stadium") were built, so as the administrative headquarters of the Belgrade Rowing Club at the mouth of the Topčiderka.

==== World War II and after ====
During the German occupation, as the food became scarce and parts of population began to starve, city administration parceled part of the island and awarded the lots to its clerks and other employees to grow vegetables and other food. Occupational administration planned to establish a concentration camp on the island, right after the capitulation of Yugoslavia in April 1941. They decided to push the idea after the attack on Soviet Union in June 1941, but ultimately had to drop the idea of the island camp due to the constant flooding of Ada. Instead, they decided to use the barracks of the 18th Infantry Regiment of the Kingdom of Yugoslavia in Banjica, creating the Banjica concentration camp in July 1941.

Until 1941, a prison was located on Ada Ciganlija. On the night of 17 July 1946, new Communist authorities executed a number of former politicians on Ada Ciganlija, while military officers were tried as collaborators with the Nazis during World War II, including Chetniks leaders Draža Mihailović and Kosta Mušicki, and ministers in the government of Milan Nedić: Tanasije-Tasa Dinić, Đura Dokić and Velibor Jonić. Despite other plans, Ada was a prison from 1928 to 1954 and was nicknamed the "Little Serbian Alcatraz". It was established on the notion of the king Alexander I of Yugoslavia and the prisoners include Milovan Đilas, Moša Pijade and Borislav Pekić.

In 1947, a public swimming pool was built behind the premises of the "Crvena Zvezda" rowing club. Known as the "Sever pool" (Severov bazen), it became quite popular as it was one of the rare such venues in Belgrade in those days. Many swimmers held preparations for the Olympic games in it. In the 1950s, as part of the Youth work actions, the filling of the bank on the swampy island was organized, which in total employed some 15,000 youth workers.

In 1957 city government decided to put in order the neglected, feral island. The beach was gradually prolonged as the overgrowth and trees were cut and cleared, under the strict control by the experts from the University of Belgrade Forestry Faculty. Works on transforming the island began in 1960. That year, the army constructed a temporary, pontoon bridge to connect the island with the mainland. This prompted opening of numerous beach baths on the island: first was Partizan, followed by Grafičar, Zvezda, Beograd and others, including many unregulated. This marked the end of beach locations on the opposite side of the river, as they all were closed in the next several years. By September 1961 an embankment on the outer side of the island was finished. It is 6 km (3.7 mi) long, 8 m (26 ft) wide at the crown and prevented the Sava to flood the island every spring, like it used to do. Already at the time, Ada was the largest and the most visited swimming and excursion site.

The military removed the pontoon bridge in 1966, and transferred it to the Great War Island. This was when the filling of the permanent embankment which was to connect Ada with the mainland began. Milan Pećinar, engineer and a member of the Serbian Academy of Sciences and Arts suggested the dual solution for Ada, as both the source of the drinking water and a sports and recreation center. His plan was conducted by 1967 when Ada was connected to the mainland on both the north and south tips, and the Sava Lake and the settling basin Taložnik. In the 1968 season, the first visitors came to the lake. An underground pipeline was built in 1969 which conducted water from the river into the newly formed lake. The water is being purified in the Taložnik, before being conducted further into the lake and to the Belgrade's major water facility in Makiš. The shanty settlement along the mainland bank of the Sava was demolished, and number of barge-houses on the island began to grow.

In the late 1960s and early 1970s the first sporting championships were organized, such as the kayaking championships in 1971, prompting the construction of special facilities. The popularity of Ada was further increased in the 1980s with the music and entertainment show Leto na Adi ("Summer on Ada"), televised live by the Radio Television of Serbia. Also in the 1980s, partial clearing of the wood on the Makiš side began, so as the filling of the beach on that side. In time, a continuous, over 7 km (4.3 mi) long beach around the entire lake was formed. On 21 August 1996, the 60 metres (200 ft) tall bungee jumping platform became operational. Makiš side was officially declared a swimming area in the season of 2010. In June 2017 construction of two new pipelines which would increase the amount of water transferred from the Taložnik to the water treatment facility in Makiš began. As a result, during the works in the off-season 2018–2019, the lake level was significantly lowered.

Ada Ciganlija is today managed by the municipal government via the Public Enterprise "Ada Ciganlija" (JP "Ada Ciganlija"), which maintains the grounds of the recreational areas and, especially, the beach and Lake Sava. It is responsible for cleanliness, maintenance such as trimming of the underwater algae, public safety (lifeguards), and so on. Even though the island is a public asset, the island itself is not exclusively managed and owned by the city. There are numerous private entities that administer businesses and recreation facilities, such as the golf course. Notably, many famous Serbian sports personalities have invested in the area.

== Facilities, activities and tourism ==
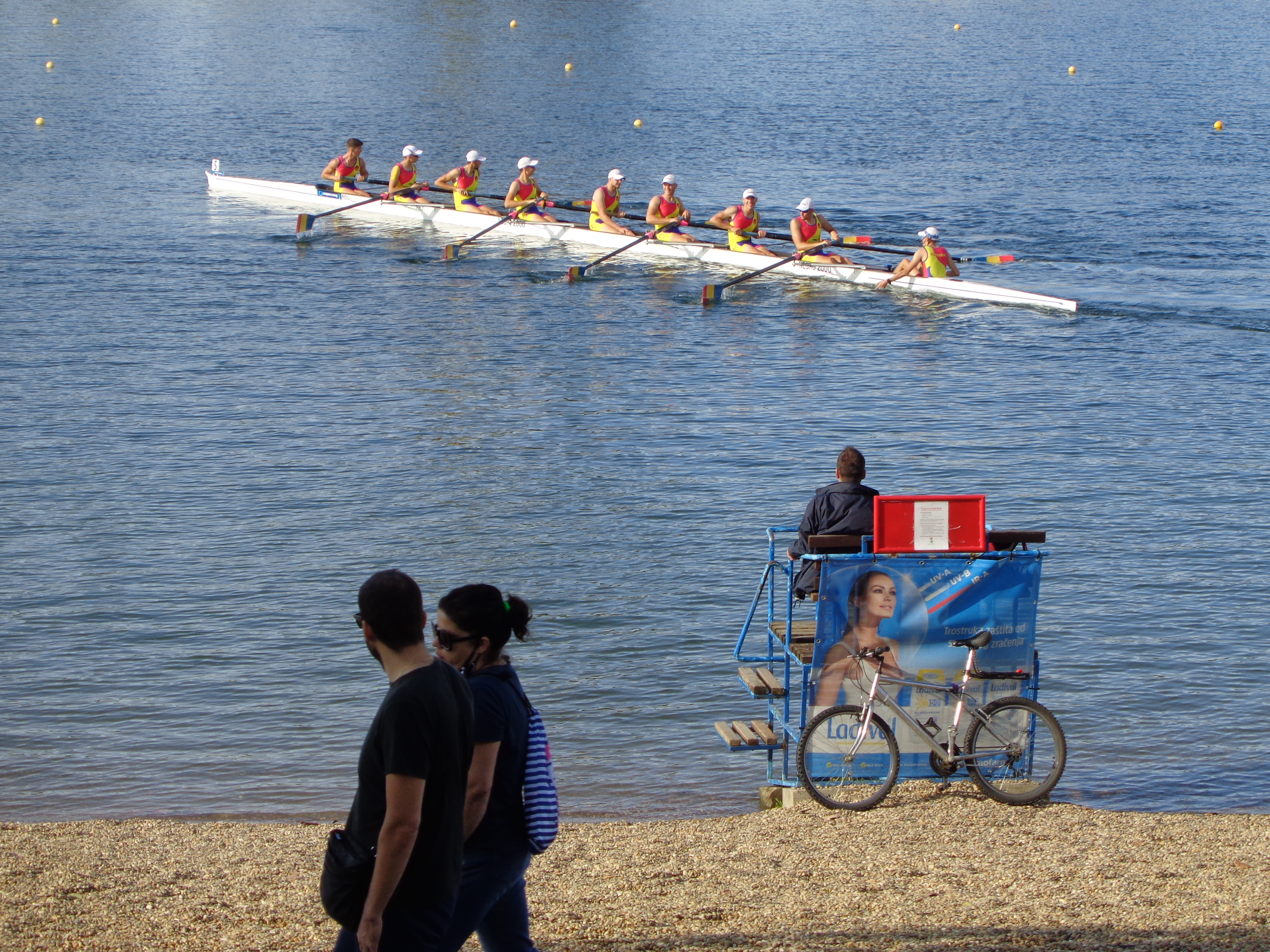
Ada Ciganlija

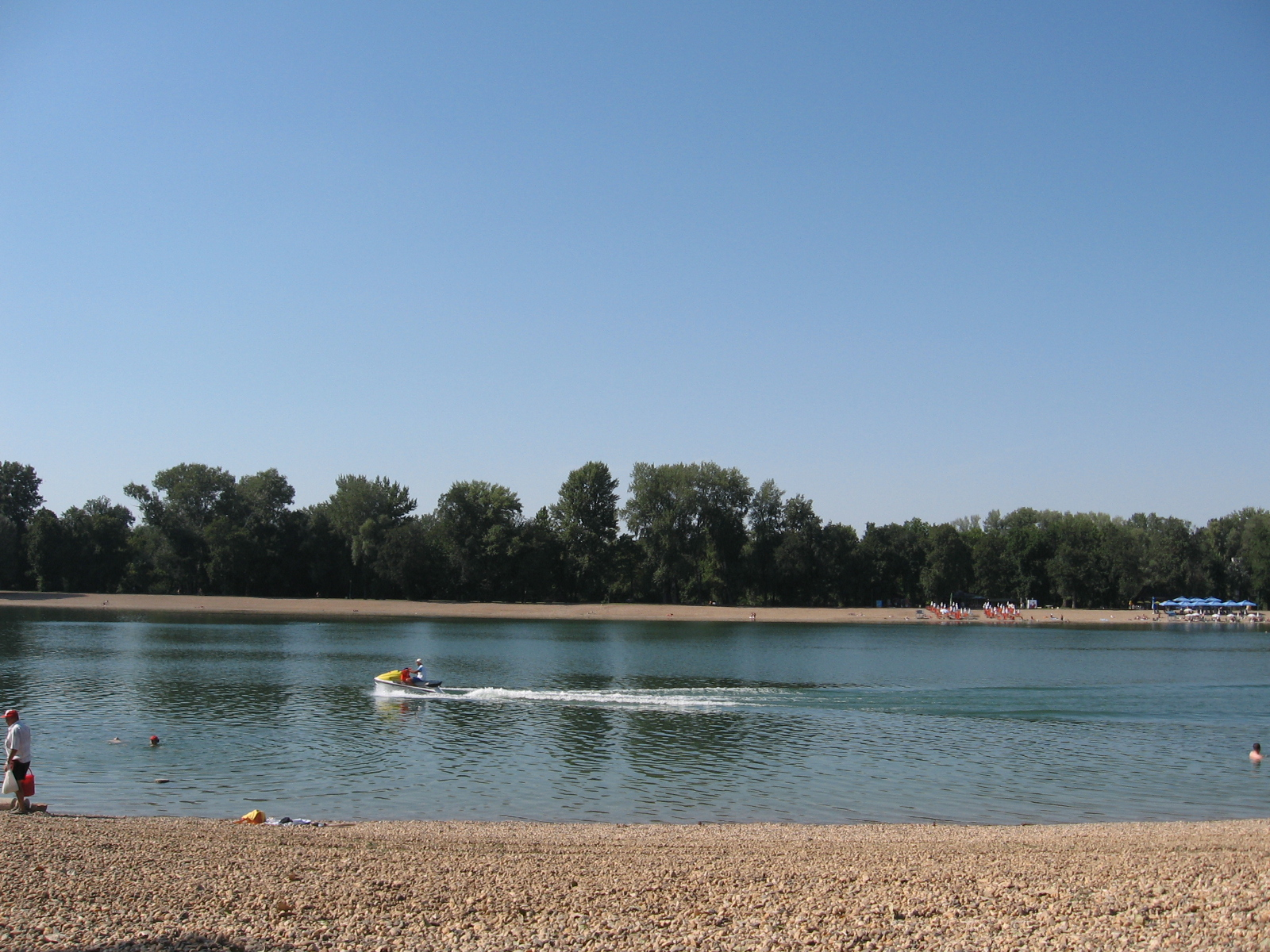
Ada Ciganlija beach. The heavily wooded Makiš can be seen across Lake Sava

Apart from the sport facilities, a 7 kilometer-long beach of Lake Sava has a closely supervised, fenced-off children's swimming area. Ada Ciganlija features a tall sports observation tower and bleachers on multiple levels which is its most prominent structure as well and one of very few permanent solid structures. One of those structures is the "Jezero" hotel at the entrance.

The northern edge of the island is lined with attached floating barges, or houses on the water owned by many inhabitants of Belgrade as a weekend refuge given the peninsula's exceptionally quiet and green environment. In addition, many city dwellers come to enjoy fishing excursions, picnics and barbecues.

=== Sport ===
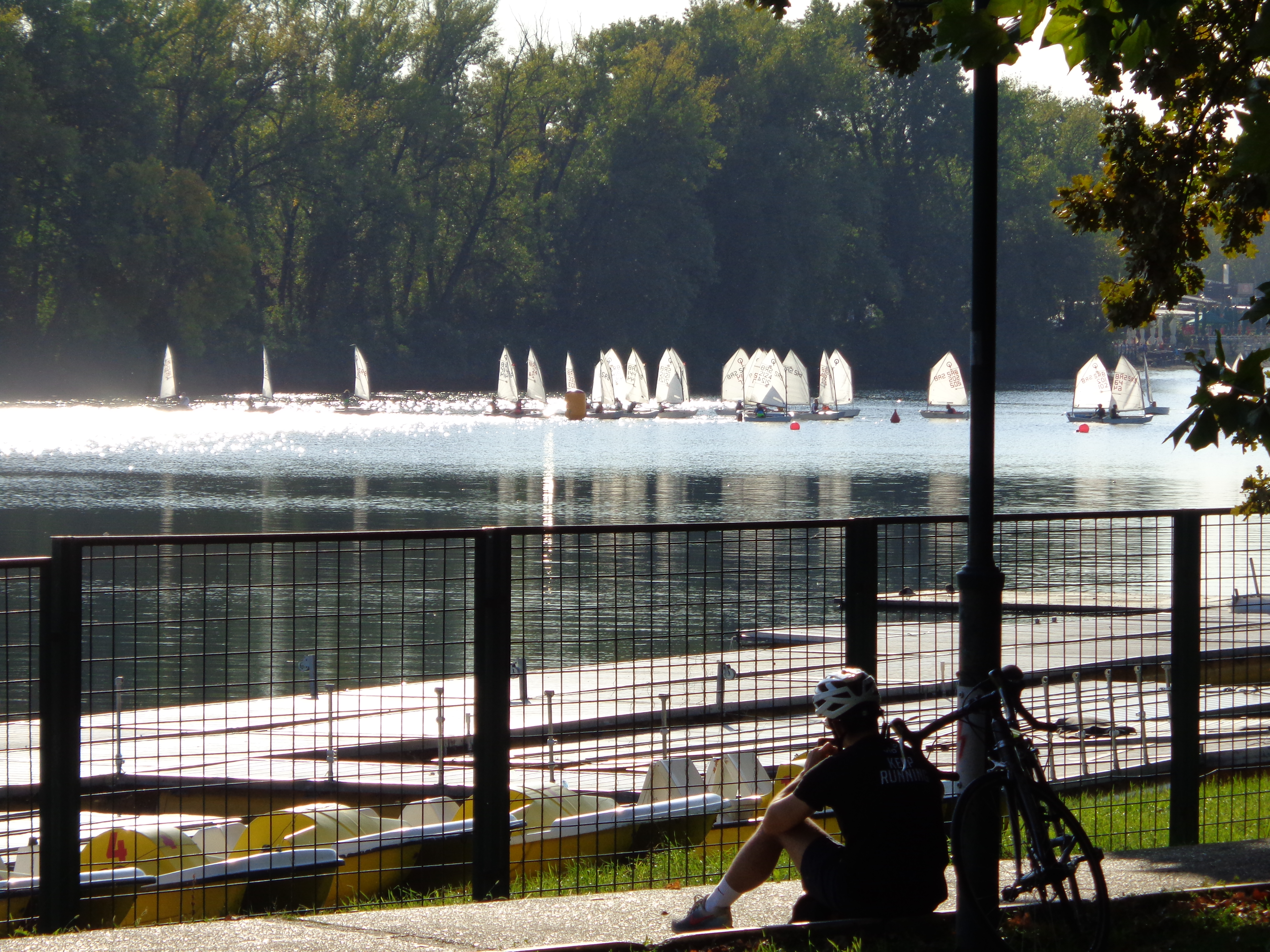

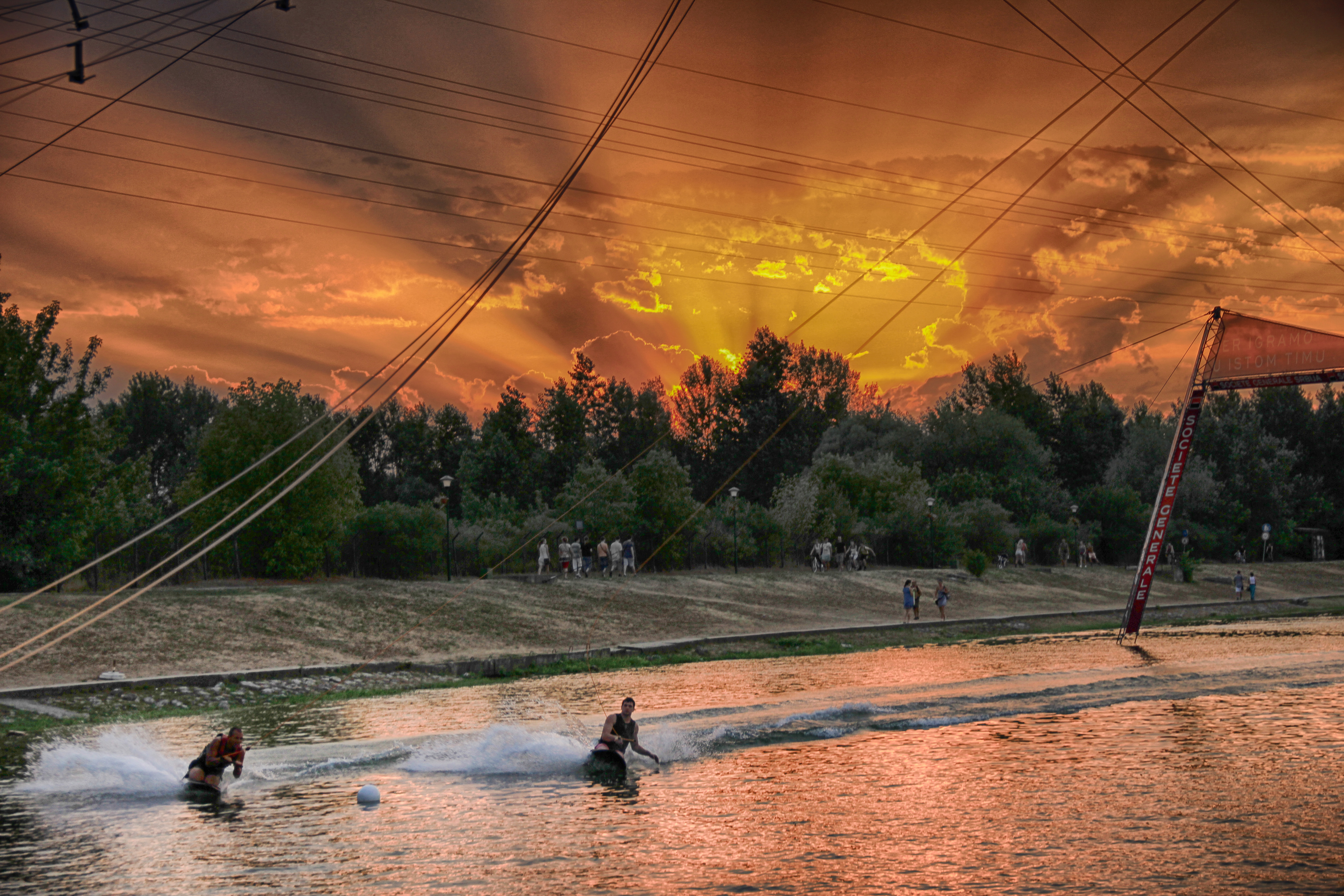
Water skiing

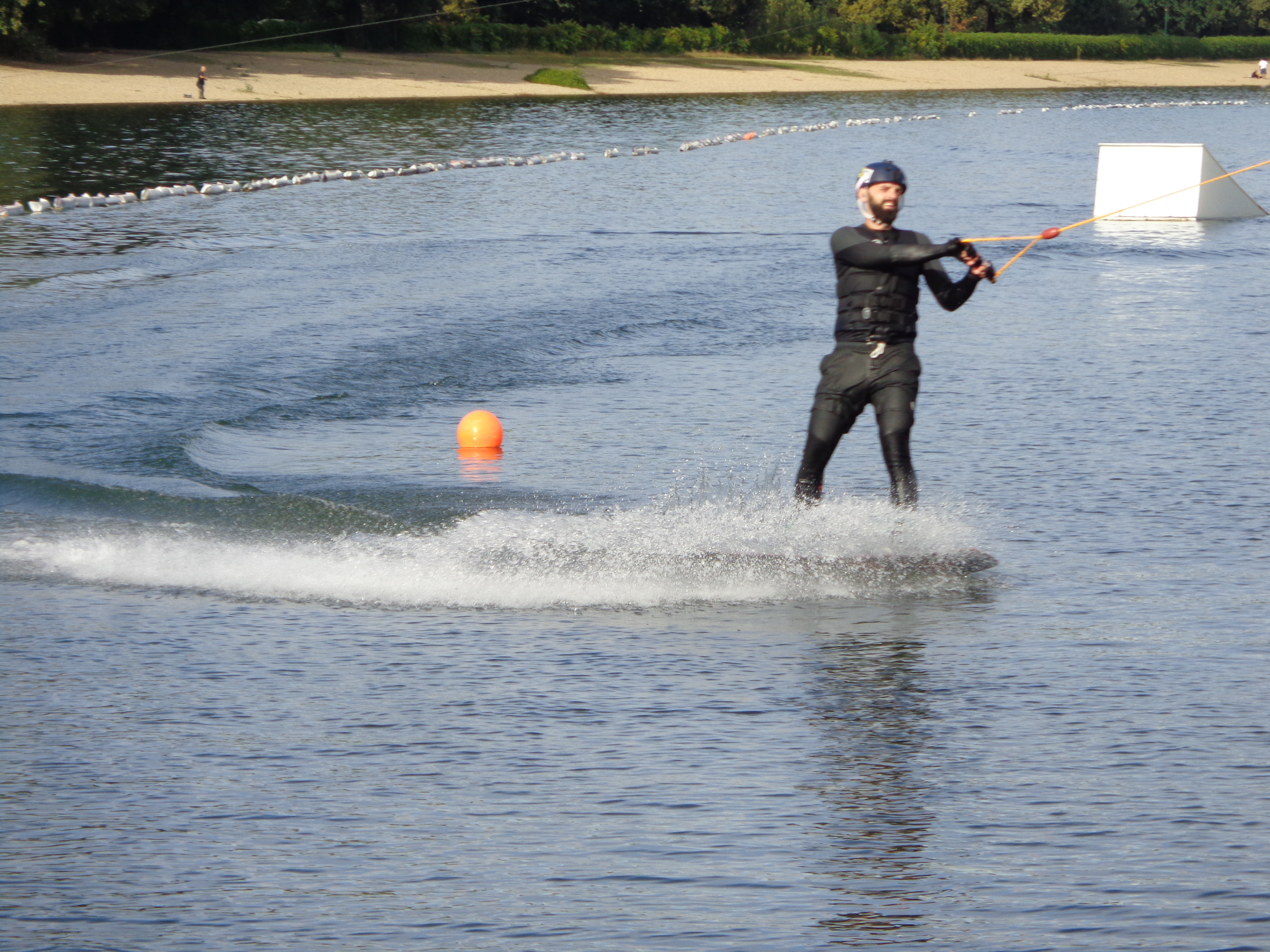
Water skiing

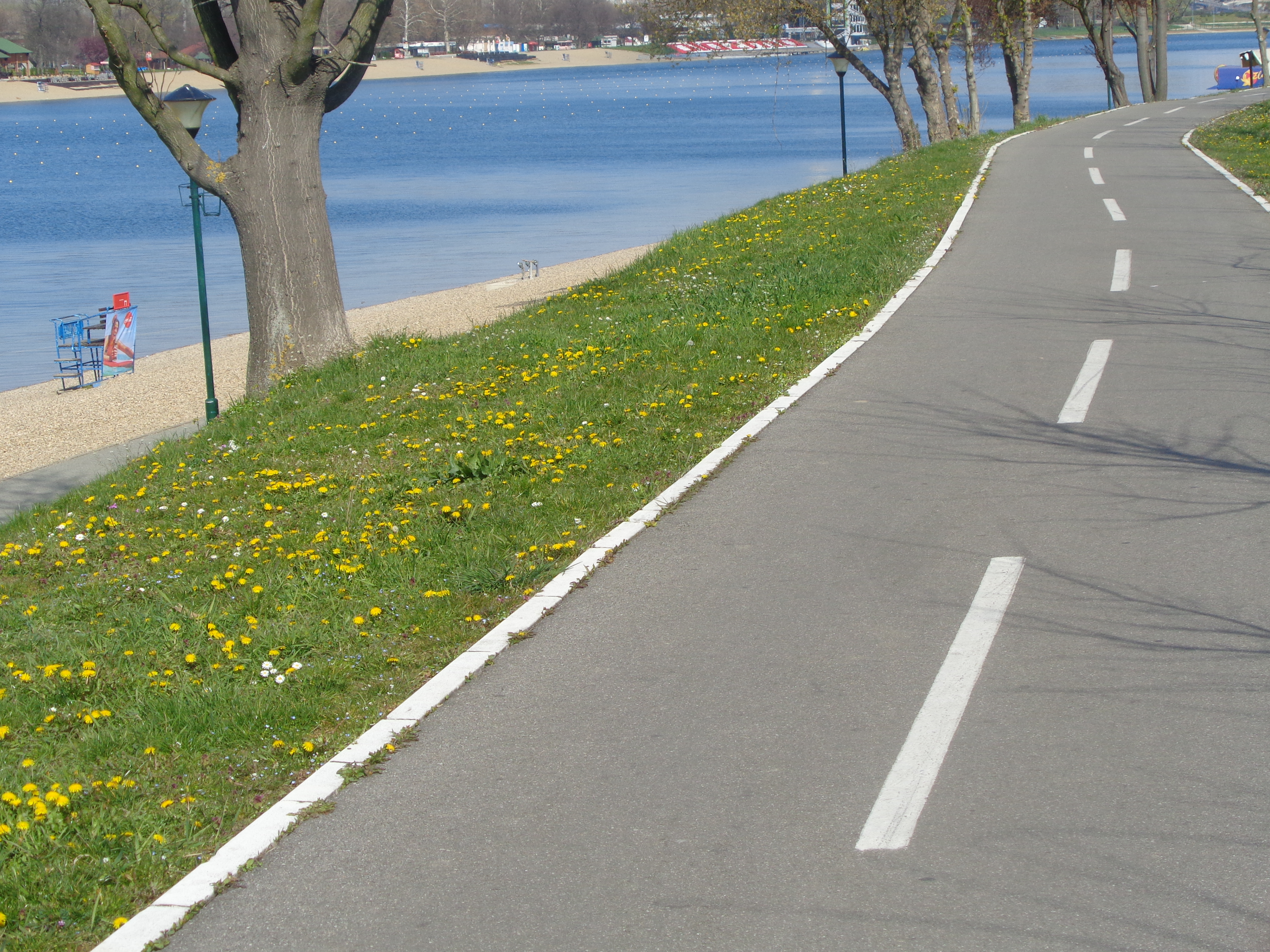

The island has been conceptualised as Belgrade's focal point for mass sporting activity and recreation. As such, it features a great number of facilities, which get more numerous every year. They include:

- tennis courts
- bike paths
- volleyball courts
- beach volleyball courts
- soccer fields
- five-a-side football fields
- skateboarding ramps
- rollerskating paths
- basketball courts
- a paintball field
- baseball fields
- bocce facilities
- Water football facilities
- rugby fields
- kayaking facilities
- an artificial rock climbing wall
- chess facilities
- water slides
- rowing facilities
- diving range
- artificial alpine skiing slope
- artificial snowboarding slope
- bungee jumping platform
- trim trail
- fishing facilities
- cable skiing facilities
- canoeing facilities
- water polo courts
- pedalos
- a golf course
- American football

Ada Ciganlija has in the past been a host to a number of local and international water sporting events such as competitions in rowing and kayaking. The very first golf course in Serbia has been built on this island in recent years along with a golf club house, a golfing store, golfing school and a practice range. This golf course is also the seat of the first and so far only Serbian golfing association. Also there is a separated cycling and rollerblading path that goes full circle around the lake (approximately 8 km long) and is connected to the path that goes all the way by the Sava river in downtown.

The island is home to the "Rowing Sport Club" and several rowing societies like VK Partizan, VK Crvena Zvezda, and VK Grafičar. A sailing school and club, in addition to all accompanying sailing facilities, can be found on Ada Ciganlija.

Within the complex of the Belgrade Football Association, a monument to Hugo Buli (1875–1941 or 1942) was dedicated on 22 May 2021. On 12 May 1896 Buli brought the first football to Serbia, and on 19 May organized the first football match in the state.

=== Restaurants and nightlife ===
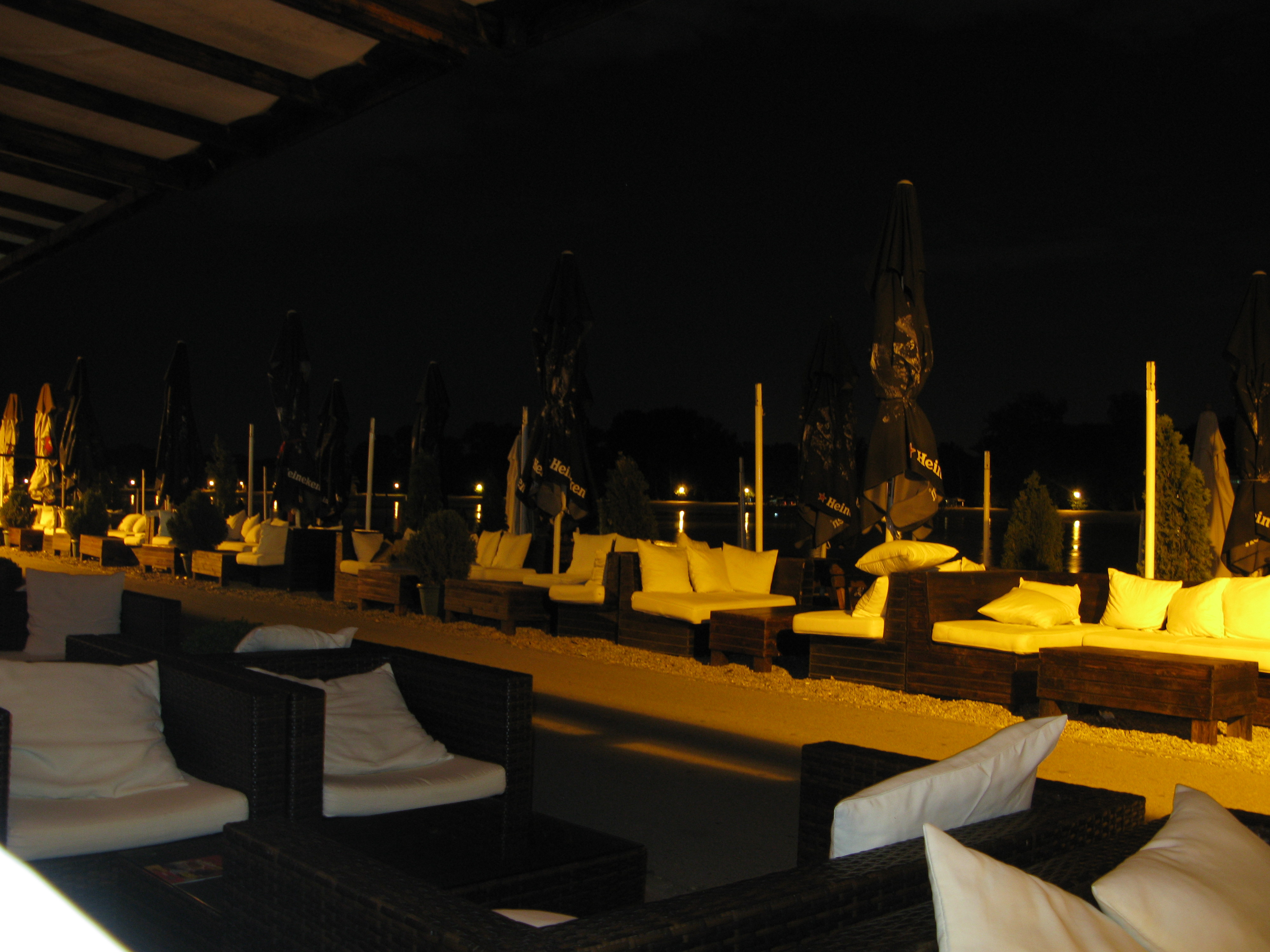
Lounge

For decades, Ada Ciganlija was popular among loners and fishermen, including the famous actor Pavle Vujisić. After his death in 1988, it was proposed that the access road to Ada should be named after him, but another street in the new neighborhood of Altina in Zemun was later named after him. Other famous bohemians which dwelled occasionally on Ada after the 1960s were actor Dragan Nikolić, writers Momo Kapor and Zuko Džumhur and opera singers Živan Saramandić and Milka Stojanović. Nobelist author Ivo Andrić called Ada the "Boka Kotorska of Belgrade" and the "Green jewel of our Pannonian rivers".

Number of splavovi (float barges) began to grow by the late 1970s and the visitors began to include the members of the political and business elite also, including mayor Živorad Kovačević. One of the first barges was "JAT", opened in the late 1970s. It was originally intended only for the employees of the JAT Airways, but soon became a gathering place for the regular clientele, becoming a famous venue in the city. It was derelict by the 2000s, when it was sold to a private owner. Before it was renovated, the barge detached and was taken by the river downstream. The owner took only emergency measures to keep it afloat, but in January 2019 it sank under the heavy snowfall. The barge itself was considered one of the best on the river. "Argument", the first restaurant on splav in Belgrade was opened in 1983. It looked like a "railroad car", without any specificities. In the 1990s it was relocated to the neighborhood of Ušće. At the time, Ada wasn't that well connected to the rest of the city which gave this venues a certain aura of exclusivity. Splav "Sara" was the very first venue in Belgrade with solely electronic music. It was opened only for a year in 1994.

Belgrade has a reputation for offering a vibrant nightlife, and many clubs that are open until dawn can be found throughout the city. The most recognizable nightlife features of Belgrade are the splavovi, spread along the banks of the Sava and Danube Rivers. The island has over 70 restaurants, bars and cafés as well as a café-cinema.

=== Ada Mall ===
First ideas of building a shopping mall on Čukarica side, across the Ada Ciganlija entrance where the former "Minel Dinamo" company was, appeared in 2007. Construction began in March 2017 and the object was opened on 24 May 2019, under the name of Ada Mall (Ada Mol). It has 5 floors, total floor area of over 90,000 m^{2} (970,000 sq ft) and atypical, attractive design, compared to the usual box-shaped malls in Belgrade: it has wavy façade with terraces and step-like floors.

Construction itself was already problematic, both financially (connections with the mayor Siniša Mali) and in terms of building process. After a while, investor reached a bedrock and decided to use dynamite. As the mall is embedded into the cliff which is fully urbanized on top, and dynamite explosions were used for almost a year, houses and buildings of the residents cracked in time. The roof tiles were falling off, while window frames separated from the walls. In the end, the residents received no support from either the investor or the city government, as municipal inspector concluded that the cracks on dozen houses are not caused by the explosions below.

As the opening of the facility was hurried, so that it could be opened ceremonially by the politicians, it wasn't fully finished when it was opened. Some sections were empty, dirty and covered in dust, the walls were naked, without panels, floor panels were badly placed, and electric wires were protruding into the corridors. The façade wasn't completely finished either, while some works on the access paths and the building itself have been reported as "slack". In the next several months, streak of bad luck for the object continued. Already in June it was evacuated two times in just couple of days, after it got flooded during the heavy rains. This gave the facility a nickname "Kada Mol" (kada, Serbian for bathtub). In July it was evacuated again because of the faulty alarm system, and in September due to the sabotage of the same system.

=== Footbridges ===
The original project of Ada Mol also envisioned a footbridge (pasarela), which would directly connect the mall with the pedestrian section of the Radnička Street. The footbridge hasn't been constructed, but the investor, who estimated the cost of the short pedestrian bridge to €1 million, promised it will be built by the end of 2019. Construction of the footbridge began in May 2020. It is not going to only connect the mall with the bus stop across the Paštrovićeva Street, as originally planned, but will continue from there across the Radnička Street, reaching the entrance area of Ada Ciganlija. Deadline was set for September 2020. The project was described as "not really complicated", yet the deadline was first moved to 1 December 2020, and then to 15 March 2021, before being moved to 30 April 2021.

Though construction works were effectively completed in May 2021, it remained closed, and the opening was moved to March 2022, then prolonged to August, late September, November 2022, and then to January 2023, as all necessary permits still weren't issued, and the city still had to officially take over the ownership of the footbridge. After 30 months of delays, the footbridge was opened for pedestrians on 13 February 2023, without ceremony, official takeover by the city, functional connection to the mall itself, and without any of the three elevators working.

The residents petitioned for the footbridge on another location in 2012, a bit further from the present Ada Mol. City began some procedures in 2019. In June 2020, construction was announced. The footbridge will directly connect the neighborhood of Čukarička Padina with hypermarket Tempo Centar, and further with Ada Ciganlija, over the 8-lane Obrenovac Road. Deadline is set for June 2021. In April 2022 the deadline was moved to July, and then to the autumn of 2022. The steel footbridge will be 40.5 metres (133 ft) long, and roofed. Construction began in late September 2022, and while majority of works were finished by November, as of February 2023 the bridge was still not in use. It was opened for pedestrian traffic on 25 May 2023.

=== Landmarks ===
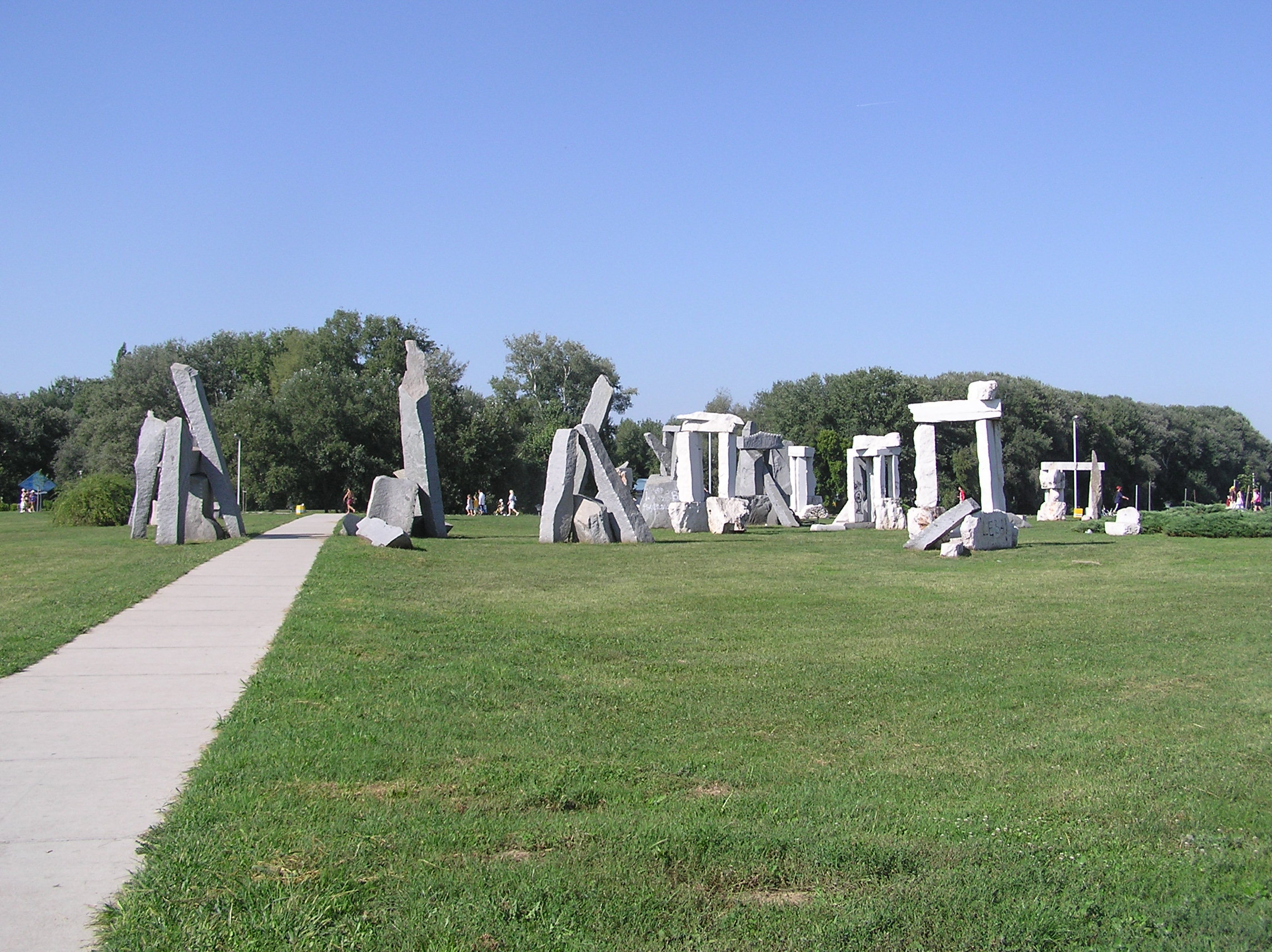
Sculptural composition called Stone City, or nicknamed Adahenge. Work of sculptor Ratko Vulinović, it is located at the entrance to the island

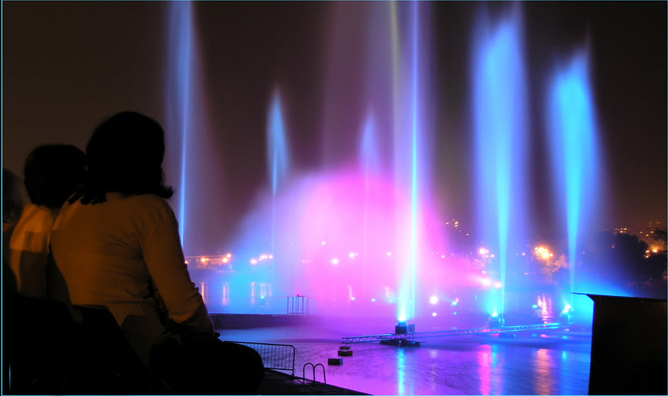
Water and light show by the lake

One of the island's most noted landmarks is the fountain, based on the famous Jet d'Eau (water-jet), situated in Lake Geneva. The Belgrade one is also 140 metres high and it was installed in 1996. The fountain operates during the day all year round, except in case there is frost or a particularly strong wind. It also operates in the evening between spring and autumn and is lit by a set of lights. During the summer months in the later hours, the island stages a special laser light spectacle for those still present at the beach.

This Island also has an artistic sculpture workshop located at the eastern end in the direction of the city. Ada Ciganlija also has a children's theatre featuring scheduled performances, as well as a Robinson Crusoe-themed entertainment feature that stages themed performances.

== Transportation ==
=== Roads ===
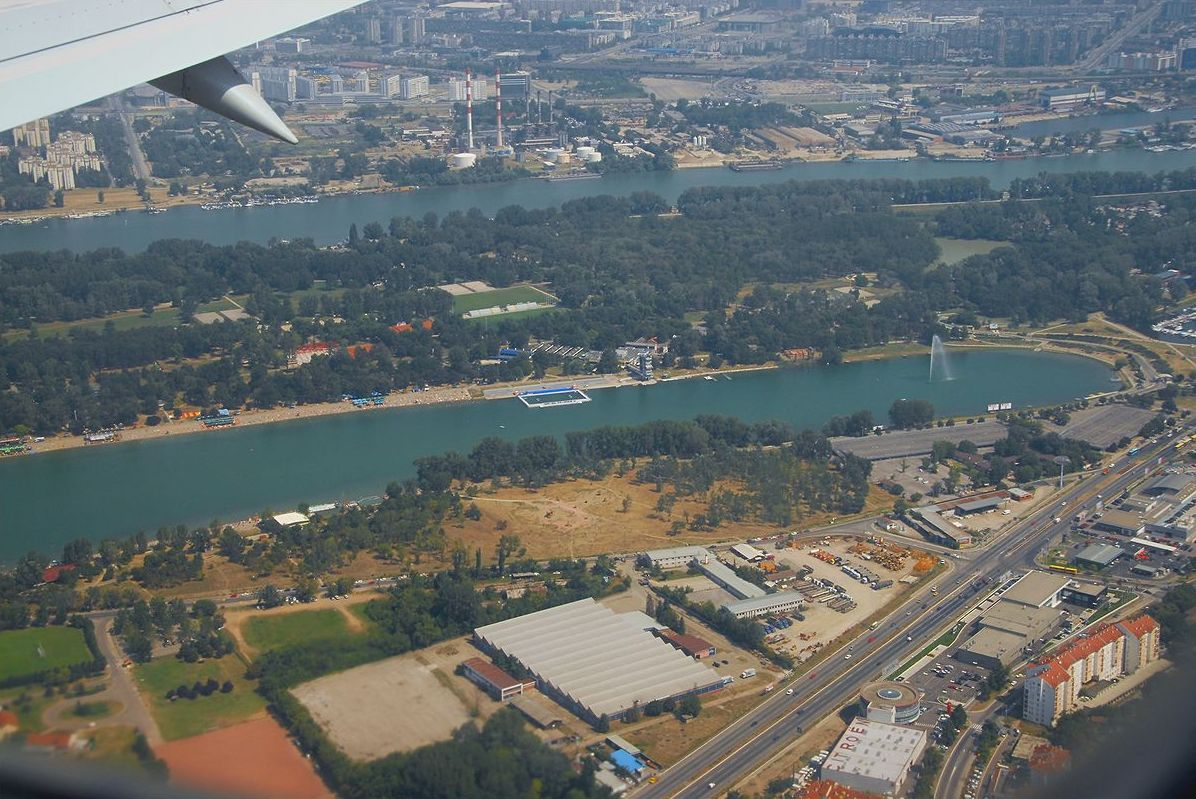
View from airplane

Although there are land routes leading to the island across the artificial dams, they are seldom used due to poor accessibility to the city's main roads and public transport system. Numerous routes of the city's public transport (GSP Beograd) pass close to the eastern entrance: bus routes 23, 37, 51, 52, 53, 56, 56L, 57, 58, 88, 89, 91, 92, 511, 551 and 552, while tram lines 12 and 13 also pass relatively nearby. Due to the ever-larger number of visitors, GSP Beograd introduced special seasonal bus lines, specifically designated for transport to Ada Ciganlija from distant parts of Belgrade. They have been expanding in recent years: Ada1 (Central Belgrade and Vidikovac), Ada2 (Zemun, Blokovi), Ada3 (Konjarnik), Ada4 (Mirijevo), Ada5 (Bežanijska Kosa, Novi Beograd).

=== Bridges ===
==== Ada Bridge ====
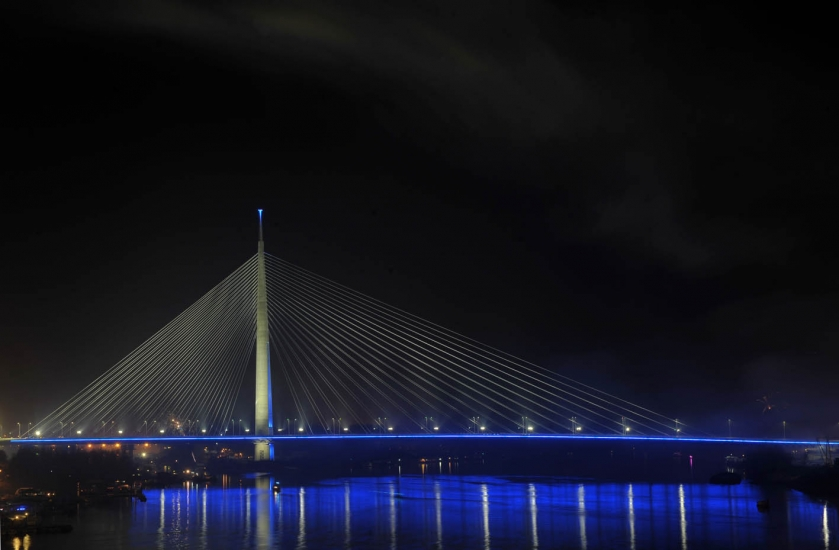
Ada Bridge, opened for traffic on 1 January 2012

A new cable-stayed bridge is being built across the Sava, over the eastern tip of the Ada Ciganlija. The bridge is set to be a future landmark due to its height and grandeur. The central abutment is to be 200 meters tall, carrying hundreds of cables suspending the bridge. It will provide a direct land link to the island via the elevators as well as a planned light rail station that will stop mid-bridge to service passengers to and from the island.

==== Ada Bridge II ====
When plans were made for the Ada Bridge, one of the proposals was the location on the opposite, upstream tip of Ada Ciganlija, instead of the downstream one, where it was built in the end. It would connect Makiš on the right, and Savski Nasip on the left bank of the Sava. When Ada Bridge was close to be finished, architects suggested this other location as the place where the next Belgrade bridge might or should be built.

==== New Belgrade-Ada Ciganlija Bridge ====
In March 2020, it was announced that the construction of the first pedestrian-cyclist bridge in Belgrade will commence in 2021. It will connect New Belgrade with the island of Ada Ciganlija across the Sava, as the continuation of the Omladinskih Brigada street in Block 70. Public, partially underground garage with 300 parking spots will be built at the end of the street. This is the second part of the project city administration alleged is the result of citizens' online voting (first part is relocation of the Old Sava Bridge on dry land, in the Park Ušće to become an "attraction"). Reporters and public distanced from the voting or debunked it as being rigged. City then announced plans for a completely new bridge and in December 2020 announced it will be finished in 2022.

New project includes a two-level parking lot on the New Belgrade's side, in the Block 70. This was one of the reasons for the protests of the local residents, who claimed the bridge will disrupt neighborhood's green zones, create even larger traffic jams, and turn Block 70 into the vast parking lot for Ada visitors. The 2020 petition against the bridge was signed by over 10,000 residents. City said the bridge will be built regardless, but moved the beginning of the construction for the late 2023 or early 2024. When the plan was opened for public viewing in December 2022, citizens filed 3,500 complaints. With the announcement of the relocation of the Belgrade Zoo to Ada, mayor Aleksandar Šapić also announced expedition of this project, stating that by the early 2025 the bridge should be finished. City set the design competition only in November 2023, giving a deadline of 765 days just for the completion of all paperwork and permits. The planned bridge should be 520 m (1,710 ft) long.

=== River ===
There are regular ferry services to take people from Belgrade's river banks onto the island. In 2008, experimental introduction of public transport by boat began, one of whose routes is from Blok 44 (Novi Beograd)-Ada Ciganlija. There is also a small electric road vehicle that tours the island called the "tourist train". There is also an impromptu recreational marina on the island's downstream end. There are plans to expand this marina and make it permanent. Boating in the lake, as well as car traffic on land, is strictly forbidden. There is a large parking lot on the Makiš side of the river.

=== Gondola lift ===
In 1922 company "Čavlina and Sladoljev" from Zagreb drafted the project of connecting two banks of the Sava river by the cable car. In 1928, building company "Šumadija" again proposed the construction of the cable car, which they called "air tram" but this project was planned to connect Zemun to Kalemegdan on Belgrade Fortress, via Great War Island. The interval of the cabins was set at 2 minutes and the entire route was supposed to last 5 minutes. The project never realized. Engineer and CEO of the Yugoslav institute for urbanism and dwelling "Juginus", Mirko Radovanac, revived the idea in the 1990s. After conducting extensive surveys (traffic analysis, interviews with the commuters, climatic, geological, urban and other researches), "Juginus" presented the project in 1993. They proposed that the terminuses should be at the Sports Center Košutnjak and Block 44 in the neighborhood of Savski Blokovi in New Belgrade, across the Sava. Stops in between would include the major public transportation roundabout in Banovo Brdo, Makiš and Ada Ciganlija, five in total. They called it the "ideal route". The plan also included construction of commercial areas around the terminuses, which would cover 2,000 m^{2} (22,000 sq ft) and help with the profitability of the project. Apart from being ecological and an attraction, it was estimated that it would shorten the trip for 45 minutes.

City government included the project into the city's General Urban Plan, which envisioned the construction in phases, the first being a 1,000 m (3,300 ft) long section Block 44-Ada Ciganlija. It would lay on 8 steel pillars, 35 m (115 ft) above the ground and the trip would last for 3 minutes. The cabins were projected to receive not just the commuters, but also the bicycles, skateboards, sledges and skis, as the cableway was planned to work year-round. The complete facility would have of 27 pillars, it would be 5 km (3.1 mi) long which would be travelled in 15 minutes by 2,000 commuters per hour.

Despite the project has been publicly revived by the mayors Dragan Đilas (2008–2013) and Siniša Mali (2013–2018), it remained on hold. The idea was included in the Belgrade's General Regulatory Plan in December 2021, including two phases: New Belgrade-Ada Ciganlija-Makiš, and Makiš-Banovo Brdo-Košutnjak. After announcing relocation of the zoo to Ada, mayor Aleksandar Šapić announced execution of the project, expanding its New Belgrade starting point from the Blokovi neighborhood to Delta City. He announced reactivation of the publicly unknown city project from 2009.

== Social aspect ==
Ever since Ada Ciganlija began gaining popularity, there have been varying views of its importance. During the economic hardship of the 1980s and subsequent wars of the 1990s, it was often regarded as a "necessary evil", as the only resort available to masses of economically disadvantaged people. Use of this recreation area has always been free of charge, leading to it often being overcrowded and regarded as having poor hygiene, because, for decades, Ada had no proper facilities or institutionalised care. That has changed however, and the zone is today properly maintained, and has suitable infrastructure and appropriate commercial and recreational content. It is now possible to play sports that were not even invented when transformation of Ada began and it has become a highly popular gathering place, especially among youth, and a must-see destination for foreign tourists visiting Belgrade.

== See also ==
- Sava
- Belgrade
- Ada Bridge
