= List of former and proposed municipalities of Belgrade =

This is a list of former and proposed municipalities of Belgrade, the capital city of Serbia. The city currently consists of 17 municipalities, 10 urban and 7 suburban, but after World War II, over 30 more municipalities were created, abolished and merged with each other.

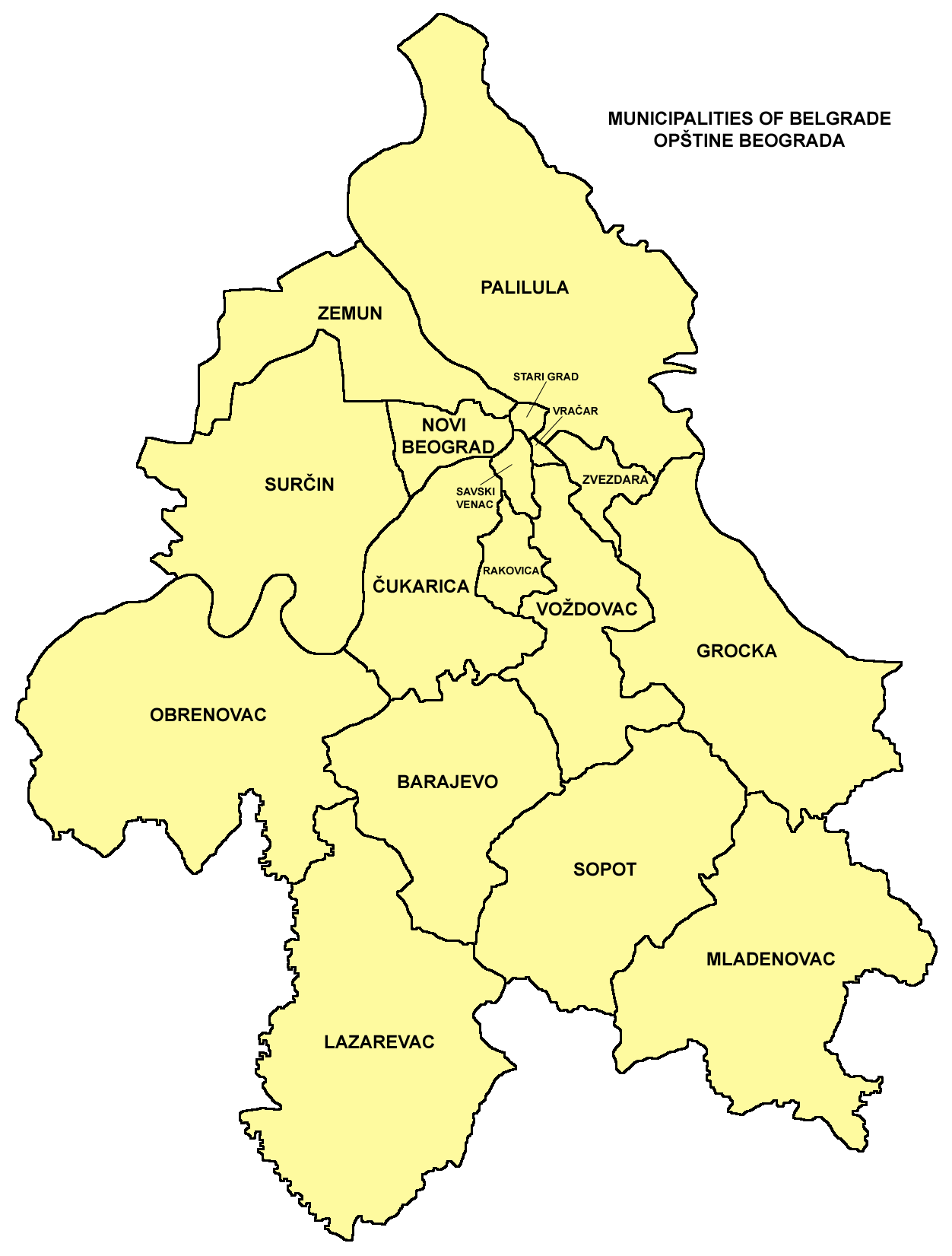
Metropolitan area of the City of Belgrade (click to enlarge)

== Formation of metropolitan area ==
It took 27 years (from 1944 to 1971) to territorially shape the modern metropolitan area of the City of Belgrade. Even after 1971 some changes occurred, but due to the internal reorganization, the area's outer borders were intact. Certain ideas of the enlarging further the metropolitan area appeared in the early 1990s. Still, they were not realized (see "Further expansion" below). Some of the most important changes include:

- after 1944 - Belgrade consisted of the City of Belgrade, which covered the urban area (divided into raions), and the Zemun and Vračar districts (srez), which covered the suburban areas. As the city expanded, almost entire area of the Vračar District today also makes urban section.
- 1952 - Raions were abolished and the urban section was divided into municipalities.
- 1955 - City of Belgrade and parts of the Zemun, Vračar and Podunavlje districts merged into the new, Belgrade District. At this point, the area was enlarged to 2,090 km^{2}, followed by the creation of many new urban municipalities.
- 1957 - New reorganization of the municipalities which reduced their number by merger.
- 1960 - Another reorganization and abolition of some municipalities (including Rakovica which was annexed to Čukarica). Metropolitan area enlarged as many municipalities from the bordering districts were annexed to the Belgrade's municipalities.
- 1965 - Abolition of the municipalities of Surčin (annexed to Zemun) and Krnjača (annexed to Palilula), reducing number of municipalities to 13: Barajevo, Čukarica, Grocka, Novi Beograd, Obrenovac, Palilula, Savski Venac, Sopot, Stari Grad, Voždovac, Vračar, Zemun and Zvezdara.
- 1971 - Fourteenth and fifteenth municipalities, Lazarevac and Mladenovac, annexed to the City of Belgrade, shaping its present territory (3,222 km^{2}).
- 1974 - Sixteenth municipality, Rakovica, split from Čukarica.
- 2003 - Seventeenth municipality, Surčin, split from Zemun.

== Former municipalities ==
The list deals with all the municipalities which existed on the territory of the modern City of Belgrade since 1945, regardless if they were administratively part of Belgrade during their existence or not.

- Batajnica - now part of the municipality of Zemun (see the "Proposed municipalities" below). Population: 5,291 in 1953.
- Beljina - short-lived municipality created in 1956. Consisted of the villages of Beljina, Arnajevo, Manić and Rožanci. Already in 1957 it was abolished and annexed to the municipality of Barajevo to which it still belongs. It had a population of 2,171 in 1953 and 4,116 after the enlargement in 1956. If it would exist today, it would have a population of only 2,555 according to the census of population of 2011 and would be the second least populous municipality in the entire Serbia, after Crna Trava in the Jablanica District.
- Bežanija - municipality abolished and annexed to the municipality of Novi Beograd in 1955. Population: 3,330 in 1953.
- Boljevci - now part of the municipality of Surčin (incorporated into Zemun 1965-2003). Population: 3,468 in 1953.
- Borča - municipality abolished in 1955 and annexed to the municipality of Krnjača, which in turn was incorporated into the municipality of Palilula in 1965. See Dunavski Venac below at "Proposed municipalities". Population: 3,384 in 1953.
- Dobanovci - now part of the municipality of Surčin (incorporated into Zemun 1965-2003; see "Proposed municipalities" below). Population: 3,519 in 1953.
- Draževac - municipality abolished in the 1960s and annexed to the municipality of Obrenovac. Population: 1,934 in 1953.
- Dudovica - municipality abolished in the 1960s and annexed to the municipality of Lazarevac. Technically, it was never municipality of Belgrade as Lazarevac was not part of the City of Belgrade at that time (it was part of the Valjevo District), but it was located on the territory of the modern metropolitan area of Belgrade. Population: 922 in 1953.
- Grabovac - municipality abolished in the 1960s and annexed to the municipality of Obrenovac. Population: 3,462 in 1953.
- Istočni Vračar - municipality created on 1 September 1955 with division of the municipality of Vračar. Merged with the municipality of Neimar and the part of the municipality of Terazije on 1 January 1957 to re-create the municipality Vračar. Population: 35,986 in 1953.
- Karaburma - municipality created on 1 September 1955, on 3 January 1957 incorporated into the municipality of Palilula. It had a population of 9,587 in 1953. Modern local communities which make the modern neighborhood of Karaburma had a combined population of 31,815 in 2011.
- Krnjača - municipality was much enlarged in 1955 when the municipalities of Borča, Ovča and Padinska Skela were annexed to it. However, in 1965 Krnjača was itself incorporated into the municipality of Palilula (see Dunavski Venac at the "Proposed municipalities" below). It had a population of 2,936 in 1953 and, after the enlargement, 21,904 in 1961. Today, it would have a population of 86,841 (2011).
- Lekino Brdo - municipality created in 1952, incorporated into the municipality of Voždovac on 1 September 1955. It had a population of 24,711 in 1953. The neighborhood was known as Pašino Brdo until the 1950s when was renamed Lekino Brdo, but the original name was restored in the late 1990s.
- Mali Mokri Lug - municipality enlarged in the 1950s, abolished on 1 January 1957 and incorporated into the municipality of Zvezdara. Other settlements in the municipality (Kaluđerica, Leštane, Vinča) were later detached and annexed to the municipality of Grocka. Population in 1953 was 1,896 and after the enlargement 8,173. If it would exist today, the municipality would have a population of 65,741 (2011).
- Neimar - municipality merged with the municipality of Istočni Vračar and the part of the municipality of Terazije on 1 January 1957 to (re-)create the municipality Vračar. Population: 28,885 in 1953.
- Ovča - municipality abolished in 1955 and annexed to the municipality of Krnjača, which in turn was incorporated into the municipality of Palilula in 1965. See Dunavski Venac below at the "Proposed municipalities". Population: 1,767 in 1953.
- Padinska Skela - municipality abolished in 1955 and annexed to the municipality of Krnjača, which in turn was incorporated into the municipality of Palilula in 1965. See Dunavski Venac below at the "Proposed municipalities". Population: 6,694 in 1953.
- Ralja - municipality abolished in the 1960s and annexed to the municipality of Sopot. Population: 941 1 in 1953.
- Ripanj - municipality abolished and incorporated into the municipality of Voždovac in the 1960s. (see Avalski Venac at the "Proposed municipalities" below). Population: 8,255 in 1953.
- Ropočevo, municipality abolished in 1950 and annexed to the municipality of Sopot.
- Skadarlija - municipality abolished on 1 January 1957 and annexed to the municipality of Stari Grad. Population: 31,281 in 1953.
- Skela - municipality abolished in the 1960s and annexed to the municipality of Obrenovac. Population: 2,064 in 1953.
- Stari Đeram - municipality abolished on 1 January 1957 and incorporated into the municipality of Zvezdara. Population: 27,595 in 1953.
- Stepojevac - municipality abolished in 1960 and divided between the municipalities of Lazarevac and Barajevo (villages of Veliki Borak and Šiljakovac). Population: 3,138 in 1953.
- Stubline - municipality abolished in the 1960s and annexed to the municipality of Obrenovac. Population: 2,331 in 1953.
- Terazije - municipality abolished on 1 January 1957 and divided between the municipalities of Stari Grad and Vračar. Population: 17,858 in 1953.
- Topčidersko Brdo - municipality merged with Zapadni Vračar on 1 January 1957 to create the municipality of Savski Venac. Population: 20,469 in 1953.
- Umčari - municipality abolished in the 1960s and annexed to the municipality of Grocka. Prior to that, it was part of the Vračar District to 1955, then of the Smederevo district. It comprised the villages of Umčari, Begaljica, Dražanj, Živkovac, Kamendol, Brestovik and Pudarci. By the 1953 census it had 3,576 inhabitants. It had an estimated population of 10,500 in 1959, while if it would exist today it would have a population of 10,902 in 2011.
- Umka - municipality was expanded in the 1950s, abolished in 1960 and divided between the municipalities of Barajevo (villages of Vranić and Meljak) and Čukarica (villages of Umka, Rucka, Pećani, Velika Moštanica, Sremčica). By the 1953 census it had 3,044 inhabitants. It had an estimated population of 10,500 in 1959, while if it would exist today it would be three and a half times more populous: 37,082 in 2011. (see Posavski Venac below, at the proposed municipalities).
- Vrčin - now part of the municipality of Grocka (see Avala at the "Proposed municipalities" below). Population: 5,342 in 1953.
- Zapadni Vračar - municipality created on 1 September 1955 with division of the municipality of Vračar. Merged with the municipality of Topčidersko Brdo on 1 January 1957 to create the municipality of Savski Venac. Population: 21,149 in 1953.
- Žarkovo - now part of the municipality of Čukarica. As a minor village, Čukarica split from the municipality of Žarkovo in 1911, but today it is Žarkovo which belong to the municipality of Čukarica. Population: 4,642 in 1953.
- Železnik - now part of the municipality of Čukarica (see Posavski Venac below). Population: 6,758 in 1953.

== Proposed new municipalities ==
With successful 2000-2002 campaigning for Surčin's split from the municipality of Zemun (proclaimed separate municipality on 24 November 2003, separate administration from November 3, 2004), several other motions for the creation of new municipalities appeared. Acting mayor of Belgrade Zoran Alimpić stated in November 2007 that probably no new municipalities will be created before 2011 or 2012. As of April 2022 none have been created.

- Avalski Venac - a movement originated from 1996. A motion for the re-creation of the municipality of Ripanj appeared in 2002. It sought the split from the municipality of Voždovac of its distant, suburban settlements in the area of the Avala mountain: Ripanj, Beli Potok, Pinosava and Zuce. Later, a motion for Vrčin's split from the municipality of Grocka and creation of a joint sub-Avalan municipality also appeared, but wasn't that much vocal. If created, the new municipality would have a population of 28,949 (2011). In September 2007 an official motion was started by the municipality of Voždovac to create this new municipality, which would also include Resnik from the municipality of Rakovica which would raise population to 52,332. It was supported by the local administration headed by the Democratic Party at the time, but not by the members of the same party on the city level. It was also proposed by the political party G17 Plus in 2010 and Nova Stranka in 2015. Coalition Moramo, during the April 2022 campaign for the local elections in Belgrade, favored formation of the Avalski Venac municipality, but also of several others.
- Batajnica - a movement was very active in 2002, when Surčin also campaigned, but wasn't that much in the public media. Proposed municipality of Batajnica would split from the municipality of Zemun and comprise Batajnica and Ugrinovci (with Busije and Grmovac), with a population of 43,660 in 2011. The notion was supported by G17 Plus in 2010 and Nova Stranka in 2015. The movement was revived in the 2010s by the citizens' groups, but also by some politicians, though no official steps were taken. Local movement for separate municipality was established in June 2021 ("Option for our municipality Batajnica"). Coalition Moramo supported the motion in 2022.
- Bežanijska Kosa - separation from the municipality of New Belgrade, which is considered too large anyway. Combined population of Bežanijska Kosa, Bežanija and Ledine is 45,017 (2011). Also proposed by G17 Plus in 2010.
- Dobanovci - a motion for splitting from Zemun ceased when Surčin split from Zemun in 2003.
- Dunavski Venac - the most vocal of all movements, asking for the area on the left bank of the Danube to split from the municipality of Palilula and basically re-create the municipality of Krnjača (under the new name), abolished in 1965. In 2003 a petition signed by 17,000 inhabitants from the area was handed to the Belgrade City Assembly which, at the time, judged that conditions for creation of new municipality were not fulfilled. The movement continued gaining a momentum until in 2005 Municipal assembly of Palilula finally accepted to support the move but later decided the opposite so the organization of the establishment of the municipality of Dunavski Venac announced it will sue the municipality of Palilula. The proposed new municipality, if accepted and confirmed by the Belgrade City assembly, would have an area of 407 km^{2} and a population of 86,841 (2011). Supported by G17 Plus in 2010, Nova Stranka in 2015, and coalition Moramo in 2022.
- Kaluđerica - distant from its municipal seat Grocka, and with the population of 26,904 in 2011 three times larger, Kaluđerica makes one urban area with Belgrade. In 2010 G17 Plus proposed new municipality of Kaluđerica, which would also contain Leštane. In 2015, Nova Stranka proposed the detachment of Kaluđerica into separate municipality, so as coalition Moramo in 2022.
- Mirijevo - a movement which gained momentum during the ongoing protest from the local population against construction of the power transformer in the center of the neighborhood. Municipality, which would have a population of 41,407 (2011 Census), and comprise the neighborhood of Mirijevo, should split from the municipality of Zvezdara. The idea was on a hiatus for a while, but was revived in 2022 by coalition Moramo.
- New Belgrade I and New Belgrade II - proposed division of New Belgrade in two municipalities. Proposed by G17 Plus in 2010.
- Posavski Venac - a movement began in 2006 for separation from the municipality of Čukarica. Basically, it soughts the re-creation of the former Umka municipality (that is, section that belongs to Čukarica). It should consist of Železnik, Rušanj, Sremčica, Umka, Velika Moštanica, Pećani, Rucka, Ostružnica and Makiš, with a population of 61,590 in 2011. Also proposed by G17 Plus in 2010.
- Sremčica - to split from the municipality of Čukarica, if not as a part of the Posavski Venac. It has a population of 21,001 in 2011.
- Vinča - a motion, as a result of big economic and demographic discrepancy between the western and eastern parts of the municipality of Grocka, mentions Vinča as the possible seat of the future municipality formed from the western part of the municipality of Grocka, comprising also Kaluđerica, Boleč, Leštane, and Ritopek, with a population of 53,179 in 2011.
- Žarkovo - proposed by Nova Stranka in 2015 to split from Čukarica.
- Železnik - proposed by Nova Stranka in 2015. Apart from the neighborhood of Železnik, it was to include all separate settlements in the municipality of Čukarica, making it equal to the proposed Posavski Venac municipality.

== Possible expansion of metropolitan area ==
- Aranđelovac - the municipality with a population of 46,225 in 2011, located 80 kilometres (50 mi) south of Belgrade, in the Šumadija District. In September 2009, petition was started to get 4,000 signatures, so that a referendum can be organized where citizens would vote to detach from the district and to become part of Belgrade. Local population tried already twice before to attach the municipality to Belgrade, but the movements were thwarted by the local politicians. Belgrade officials were against the 2009 idea. Ultimately, the referendum was not held.
- Čenta - the village in the Vojvodina's municipality of Zrenjanin (population of 3,050 in 2011) is located on the northern border of the municipality of Palilula. Now and then, motions by the locals, not very vocal though, appear, asking for Čenta to be annexed to the City of Belgrade. Majority of population work on the territory of Belgrade and one regular bus line of the Belgrade City public transportation is connecting Čenta to Belgrade.
- Opovo - the municipality in Vojvodina with a population of 10,440 in 2011, considered by the state government for the incorporation into the City of Belgrade in 1992.
- Pančevo - the municipality in Vojvodina with a population of 123,414 in 2011, considered by the state government for the incorporation into the City of Belgrade in 1992. Though a city and large industrial center of its own (76,203 inhabitants in 2011), Pančevo already functions as de facto Belgrade's suburb: only 16 kilometer away from Belgrade, many people from Pančevo work in Belgrade with a very dense commuting, including a railway line "Beovoz" (Belgrade train) which connects the two cities, and two cities also make an almost continuous built-up area as the Belgrade spawned along the road which connects them (the industrial zone of the Belgrade's neighborhood of Krnjača). During the 1929-1941 period in the Kingdom of Yugoslavia, Pančevo, together with Belgrade and Zemun formed the Area of the City of Belgrade, official administrative entity within the kingdom. In 1957 idea of establishing trolleybus line Pančevo-Belgrade appeared in connection with future development of Pančevo industrial zone, but was dropped later.
- Stara Pazova - the municipality in Vojvodina with a population of 65,792 in 2011, it was one of the fastest growing in the province. Not officially considered for incorporation into the Belgrade, being on the outskirts of the city's metropolitan area, just like Pančevo, gravitates toward Belgrade. A commuter railway line "Beovoz" connects Stara Pazova, Belgrade and Pančevo and some of the largest settlements in the municipality, like Nova Pazova or Novi Banovci, almost make one continuous built-up area with the Belgrade's extreme north-western extension of Batajnica in the municipality of Zemun.

== Proposed and planned changes ==
Expansion of the metropolitan area of Belgrade was actual in the 1991-1992 when a new territorial reorganization was prepared for the entire Serbia. The government of Radoman Božović proposed the detachment of the municipality of Mladenovac, for example, but also the incorporation of the municipalities of the province of Vojvodina (Opovo and Pančevo) into Belgrade. A new map, with such borders was even printed in the daily newspaper of Večernje novosti at the time, but in the end the borders remained unchanged.

In an interview in April 2008, regarding the upcoming general elections, jointly with the local and provincial as well, former mayor of Belgrade in 2000-2001 period, Milan St. Protić stated that rural municipalities (like Obrenovac and Mladenovac) should be detached from Belgrade as they can't function efficiently as part of urban agglomeration. In 2010, political party G17 Plus, which was part of the ruling coalition in the city, proposed a new division with 24 municipalities. New proposed 7 municipalities were Avalski Venac, Batajnica, Bežanijska Kosa, Dunavski Venac, Kaluđerica (including Leštane), New Belgrade I and II (division of present municipality in two) and Posavski Venac. "Nova stranka", a political party formed by the former prime minister Zoran Živković, proposed a new administrative division in the late 2015, which was to exclude the municipalities of Lazarevac, Obrenovac and Mladenovac from the City of Belgrade, and creation of new urban municipalities: Avalski Venac, Batajnica, Dunavski Venac, Kaluđerica, Žarkovo and Železnik.

After the change in city government in 2014, a commission for the change of the City Statute was formed. It was announced in 2015 and 2016 that the new statute will also deal with the administrative division, return of the division of the municipalities within the city on urban and suburban, change in the municipal jurisdiction, etc., but as of October 2017 nothing changed. In October 2017, Belgrade's Administrative secretariat disclosed that the notions for Dunavski Venac, Avalski Venac and Kaluđerica were applied, but that all three were in a discord with the City Statute. In 2020, some city officials stated unofficially that Batajnica is the most probable candidate for the new, 18th municipality of Belgrade.
