= Lists of cities in Serbia and Montenegro =

This is a list of cities in Serbia and Montenegro. For a list of municipalities, see Internal structure of Serbia and Montenegro; for a list of all places in Serbia, see List of places in Serbia; for lists of villages in Serbia and Montenegro, see List of villages in Serbia and Montenegro.

(figures after the names are from the 2002 census for Serbia and 2003 census for Montenegro, two figures designate both strictly urban as well as wider city limits, T – Town, C – muniCipality)

== Serbia ==
=== Central Serbia ===
- Aranđelovac (T −24,336, C – 48,071)
- Bajina Bašta
- Belgrade (Urban Belgrade – 1,280,639, C – 1,574,050)
  - Barajevo (T – 8,200, C – 24,436)
  - Belgrade – Voždovac (T – 132,640, C – 151,746)
    - Beli Potok (T – 3,507)
    - Pinosava (T – 2,826)
  - Belgrade – Vračar (T – 57,934)
  - Grocka (T – 8,339, C – 75,376)
  - Belgrade – Zvezdara (T – 132,352)
  - Zemun (T – 146,172, C – 191,938)
  - Surčin (T – 14,209)
    - Dobanovci (T – 8,114)
  - Lazarevac (T – 23,556, C – 58,474)
    - Veliki Crljeni (T – 4,556)
    - Rudovci (T – 1,783)
  - Mladenovac (T – 22,131, C – 52,394)
  - Novi Beograd – New Belgrade (T – 217,180)
  - Obrenovac (T – 23,573, C – 70,974)
  - Belgrade – Palilula (T – 103,702, C – 155,575)
    - Borča (T – 35,001)
    - Ovča (T – 2,303)
  - Belgrade – Rakovica (T – 98,935)
  - Belgrade – Savski Venac (T – 42,483)
  - Sopot (T – 1,761, C – 20,356)
  - Belgrade – Stari Grad (T – 55,541)
  - Belgrade – Čukarica (T – 132,081, C – 168,356)
    - Ostružnica (T – 3,929)
    - Pećani (T – 489)
    - Rucka (T – 306)
    - Umka (T – 5,236)
- Bor
- Bosilegrad
- Bujanovac
- Čačak
- Ćuprija
- Despotovac
- Dimitrovgrad
- Golubac
- Gornji Milanovac (T – 23,927, C – 47,588)
- Jagodina (T – 35,514, C – 70,773)
- Kragujevac (T – 193,930, C – 211,580)
  - Stari Grad
  - Aerodrom
  - Pivara
  - Stanovo
  - Stragari
- Kraljevo
- Kruševac (T – 59,371, C – 131,102)
- Kuršumlija (T – 14,962, C – 21,608)
- Lazarevac
- Leskovac
- Loznica
- Medveđa
- Mladenovac
- Novi Pazar (T – 54,588, C – 85,534)
- Niš (T – 173,724, C – 250,518)
  - Palilula
  - Pantelej
  - Medijana
  - Crveni Krst
  - Niška Banja
- Obrenovac
- Paraćin
- Pirot
- Požarevac
- Preševo
- Priboj (T – 19,502, C – 30,283)
- Prijepolje (T – 14,960, C – 40,971)
- Prokuplje
- Šabac
- Sjenica
- Smederevo
- Smederevska Palanka
- Sopot
- Svilajnac (C – 36,000)
- Tutin
- Užice (T – 55,025, C – 82,852)
- Valjevo
- Veliko Gradište (T – 6,500, C – 27,000)
- Vranje
- Zaječar (T – 39,676, C – 65,837)

=== Vojvodina ===
- Ada
- Alibunar
- Apatin
- Bač
- Bačka Palanka (T – 29,341, C – 60,938)
- Bačka Topola
- Bački Jarak
- Bački Petrovac
- Banatski Karlovac
- Bečej (T – 25,703, C – 40,877)
- Bela Crkva
- Beočin
- Crvenka
- Čoka
- Futog
- Inđija (T – 26,244, C – 49,510)
- Irig
- Jaša Tomić
- Kačarevo
- Kanjiža
- Kikinda (T – 41,825, C – 66,800)
- Kovačica
- Kovin
- Kula
- Mačvanska Mitrovica
- Mali Iđoš
- Mol
- Nova Crnja
- Novi Bečej
- Novi Kneževac
- Novi Sad (Urban Novi Sad – 215,659, C – 298,139)
  - Novi Sad proper (190,602)
  - Petrovaradin (13,917)
  - Sremska Kamenica (11,140)
- Odžaci
- Opovo
- Palić
- Pančevo (T – 76,400)
- Pećinci
- Plandište
- Ruma (T – 32,125, C – 59,858)
- Sečanj
- Senta
- Sombor (T – 50,950, C – 96,669)
- Srbobran
- Sremska Mitrovica
- Sremski Karlovci (T – 8,839)
- Stara Pazova
- Starčevo
- Subotica
- Šid
- Temerin
- Titel
- Vrbas (T – 25,887, C – 45,839)
- Vršac
- Zrenjanin
- Žabalj
- Žitište

=== Kosovo and Metohija ===
- Deçan
- Dragaš
- Gjakova
- Gnjilane
- Ferizaj
- Istok
- Junik
- Kačanik
- Klina
- Kosovo Polje
- Kosovska Mitrovica
- Leposavić
- Novo Brdo
- Orahovac
- Peć
- Podujevo
- Pristina
- Prizren
- Skenderaj
- Štrpce
- Vitina
- Vučitrn
- Zubin Potok
- Zvečan

== Montenegro ==
- Andrijevica T – 1,073; C – 5,785
- Bar T – 13,719; C – 40,0337
- Berane T – 11,776; C – 35,068
- Bijelo Polje T – 15,883; C – 50,284
- Brskovo
- Budva T – 10,918; C – 15,909
- Cetinje T – 15,137; C – 18,482
- Danilovgrad T – 5,208; C – 16,523
- Gusinje T –
- Herceg Novi T – 16,493(incl. Igalo); C – 33,034
- Kolašin T – 2,989; C – 9,949
- Kotor T – 9,500(incl. Dobrota); C – 22,947
- Mojkovac T – 4,120; C – 10,066
- Nikšić T – 58,212; C – 75,282
- Petrovac T – 1,485
- Plav T – 3,615; C – 13,805
- Pljevlja T – 21,377; C – 35,806
- Plužine T – 1,494; C – 4,272
- Podgorica T – 136,473; C – 169,132
- Rožaje T – 9,121; C – 22,693
- Sutomore T – 1,827
- Šavnik T – 570; C – 2,947
- Tivat T – 9,467; C – 13,630
- Ulcinj T – 10,828; C – 20,290
- Žabljak T – 1,937, C – 4,204

== Dissolution ==
Following the dissolution of the State Union of Serbia and Montenegro, Serbia and Montenegro are now separate sovereign countries. For lists of cities in these two countries, see:

- List of cities in Montenegro
- List of cities in Serbia

== See also ==
- Serbia and Montenegro
- Subdivisions of Serbia and Montenegro
- List of villages in Serbia and Montenegro (disambiguation)
- Serbian cities
- List of places in Serbia
- List of cities, towns and villages in Vojvodina
- Cities of Kosovo
- List of city listings by country
- List of cities by country
