= State Road 22 (Serbia) =

Road in Serbia

State Road 22
- Serbian: Državni put IB reda 22; Serbian Cyrillic: Државни пут IБ реда 22
- Ibar Highway

Route information
- Part of E65 / E80 Bregovi – Špiljani
- Maintained by JP "Putevi Srbije"
- Length: 298.648 km (185.571 mi)

Major junctions
- From: Belgrade A1 / E75
- 346 near Sremčica; 147 near Guncati; 343 near Meljak; 344 in Meljak; 148 in Stepojevac; 27 near Lazarevac; 175 near Ćelije; 150 near Ljig; A2 in Ljig; 360 in Dići; 152 near Rudnik; 177 near Gornji Milanovac; 23 in Preljina; 179 near Preljina; 46 in Mrčajevci; A5 near Kraljevo; 24 in Kraljevo; 179 in Kraljevo; 261 near Mataruška Banja; 30 in Ušće; 411 near Ušće; 207 in Biljanovac; 412 in Brvenik; 31 near Raška; 198 in Raška; 29 in Novi Pazar; 206 in Novi Pazar; 32 in Ribariće; 203 near Bregovi
- To: Serbia – Montenegro Border at Špiljani M-5 / E-65 / E-80

Location
- Country: Serbia
- Districts: City of Belgrade, Kolubara, Moravica, Raška

Highway system
- Roads in Serbia; Motorways
← 21	→ 23

State Road 22, commonly known as Ibar Highway (Serbian: Ибарска магистрала, Ibarska magistrala), is an IB-class road, connecting Belgrade with Šumadija and Western Serbia and finally with Montenegro at Špiljani border crossing.

It starts with Orlovača interchange in Belgrade's municipality of Čukarica and is going through several major municipalities such as Ljig, Gornji Milanovac, Preljina (town in the municipality of Čačak), Kraljevo and Novi Pazar. In the southern section, highway goes in parallel to the upper course of the river Ibar, hence the name.

Before the new road categorization regulation given in 2013, the route wore the following names: M 22 and M 2 (before 2012) / A2, A4, 15 and 32 (after 2012).

The road is a part of the following European routes: E65 and E80 (Bregovi – Mehov Krš), E761 (Preljina – Kraljevo) and E763 (Belgrade – Preljina).

== Motorway alternative ==
In order to provide the safer and faster traffic link of Belgrade with Western Serbia and Montenegrin coast, and to alleviate the dangers of the Ibar Highway, the new A2 motorway is under construction from Čačak to border with Montenegro. The section from Belgrade bypass to Čačak was completed in 2019, and since then the traffic over the highway on section from Belgrade to Čačak was significantly reduced.

== Accident statistics ==
A single-lane carriageway, it bears heavy car and truck traffic between major cities of Belgrade, Čačak, Kraljevo and Novi Pazar, as well as transit traffic towards Montenegro, and occasional agricultural machinery is not unseen. If features long stretches of straight road interrupted by dangerous curves. Speeding, DUI and other traffic offences are major causes of accidents, most of them occurring during the night.

In three-year span from 2017 to 2019, a total of 1,736 traffic accidents happened on its route, with 86 deaths and 1,619 injured people.

Before the completion of motorway on section from Belgrade to Čačak, with more than 18,000 vehicles passing the highway daily (as of 2016), it was one of the most frequent roads in Serbia. Often called the "black highway", it is considered the most dangerous road in Serbia, averaging several hundreds traffic accidents annually.

== Sections ==
Section number	Length	Distance	Section name
02201	7.520 km (4.673 mi)/1.641 km (1.020 mi)	7.520 km (4.673 mi)	Orlovača interchange – Ripanj
02202	2.156 km (1.340 mi)	9.676 km (6.012 mi)	Ripanj – Lipovička šuma (Barajevo)
02203	2.744 km (1.705 mi)	12.420 km (7.717 mi)	Lipovička šuma (Barajevo) – Lipovička šuma (Velika Moštanica)
02204	3.074 km (1.910 mi)	15.494 km (9.628 mi)	Lipovička šuma (Velika Moštanica) – Meljak (Barajevo)
02205	0.556 km (0.345 mi)	16.050 km (9.973 mi)	Meljak (Barajevo) – Meljak (Vranić)
02206	12.713 km (7.899 mi)	28.763 km (17.872 mi)	Meljak (Vranić) – Stepojevac (Draževac)
02207	0.978 km (0.608 mi)	29.741 km (18.480 mi)	Stepojevac (Draževac) – Stepojevac (Veliki Crljeni)
02208	13.787 km (8.567 mi)	43.528 km (27.047 mi)	Stepojevac (Veliki Crljeni) – Lazarevac (Ibar Road)
02209	4.486 km (2.787 mi)	48.014 km (29.835 mi)	Lazarevac (Ibar Road) – Ćelije (overlap with)
02210	4.128 km (2.565 mi)	52.142 km (32.400 mi)	Ćelije – Županjac
02211	6.364 km (3.954 mi)	58.506 km (36.354 mi)	Županjac – Dudovica
02212	8.800 km (5.468 mi)	67.306 km (41.822 mi)	Dudovica – Poljanice
02213	1.571 km (0.976 mi)	68.877 km (42.798 mi)	Poljanice – Ljig
02214	3.075 km (1.911 mi)	71.952 km (44.709 mi)	Ljig – Kadina Luka
02215	5.704 km (3.544 mi)	77.656 km (48.253 mi)	Kadina Luka – Dići
02216	9.679 km (6.014 mi)	87.335 km (54.267 mi)	Dići – Ugrinovci
02217	10.739 km (6.673 mi)	98.074 km (60.940 mi)	Ugrinovci – Bućin Grob
02218	9.572 km (5.948 mi)	107.646 km (66.888 mi)	Bućin Grob – Gornji Milanovac (Nevade)
02219	2.650 km (1.647 mi)	110.296 km (68.535 mi)	Gornji Milanovac (Nevade) – Gornji Milanovac
02220	15.236 km (9.467 mi)	125.532 km (78.002 mi)	Gornji Milanovac – Preljina
02221	12.205 km (7.584 mi)	137.737 km (85.586 mi)	Preljina – Mrčajevci
02222	19.942 km (12.391 mi)	157.679 km (97.977 mi)	Mrčajevci – Kraljevo
02223	0.191 km (0.119 mi)	157.870 km (98.096 mi)	Kraljevo – Kraljevo (Jarčujak)
02224	6.771 km (4.207 mi)	164.641 km (102.303 mi)	Kraljevo (Jarčujak) – Mataruška Banja
02225	39.053 km (24.266 mi)	203.694 km (126.570 mi)	Mataruška Banja – Ušće
02226	5.234 km (3.252 mi)	208.928 km (129.822 mi)	Ušće – Bare
02227	9.575 km (5.950 mi)	218.503 km (135.771 mi)	Bare – Biljanovac
02228	8.238 km (5.119 mi)	226.741 km (140.890 mi)	Biljanovac – Brvenik
02229	9.176 km (5.702 mi)	235.917 km (146.592 mi)	Brvenik – Raška (Kosovska Mitrovica)
02230	0.554 km (0.344 mi)	236.471 km (146.936 mi)	Raška (Kosovska Mitrovica) – Raška (Kuti)
02231	17.420 km (10.824 mi)	253.891 km (157.761 mi)	Raška (Kuti) – Novi Pazar (Banja)
02232	0.333 km (0.207 mi)	254.224 km (157.967 mi)	Novi Pazar (Banja) – Novi Pazar
02233	3.454 km (2.146 mi)	257.678 km (160.114 mi)	Novi Pazar – Novi Pazar (Brđani)
02234	24.390 km (15.155 mi)	282.068 km (175.269 mi)	Novi Pazar (Brđani) – Ribariće (overlap with)
02235	12.562 km (7.806 mi)	294.630 km (183.075 mi)	Ribariće – Bregovi
02236	3.357 km (2.086 mi)	297.987 km (185.161 mi)	Bregovi – Serbia – Montenegro border (Špiljani)

== See also ==
- Roads in Serbia
- European route E65
- European route E80
- European route E761
- European route E763
