= Posavski Venac =

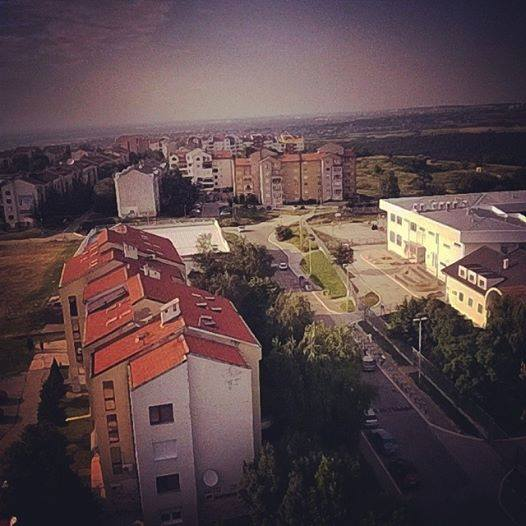
Sremčica, the largest suburban settlement in the municipality of Čukarica, and possible center of the future municipality of Posavski Venac

Posavski Venac (Serbian Cyrillic: Посавски венац) is a proposed municipality of the City of Belgrade, the capital of Serbia.

== Movement ==
One of the latest movements for the creation of new municipalities within the territory of the City of Belgrade. Originating in 2006, the movement centered on separating entire non-urban and part of urban section of the municipality of Čukarica into new municipality of Posavski Venac. Non-urban section consists of the suburban settlements of Rušanj, Sremčica, Umka, Velika Moštanica, Pećani, Rucka and Ostružnica, while from the urban section splitting neighborhoods would be Makiš and Železnik whose inhabitants appear to be the most vocal supporters of the movement. The area largely corresponds to the areas of the former municipalities of Železnik and Umka. If created, the municipality would have a population of 62,311 according to the 2002 census of population.

The political party G17 Plus proposed it again in 2010. The New Party, headed by former prime minister Zoran Živković, proposed in 2015 new municipality centered in Železnik, which would include all separate settlements in the municipality of Čukarica, making it equal to the proposed Posavski Venac municipality, minus the Makiš. It was also proposed to at least separate Sremčica into a municipality of its own, if Posavski Venac is not created.

== See also ==
- List of former and proposed municipalities of Belgrade
