= Lipovička šuma =

Forest in Serbia

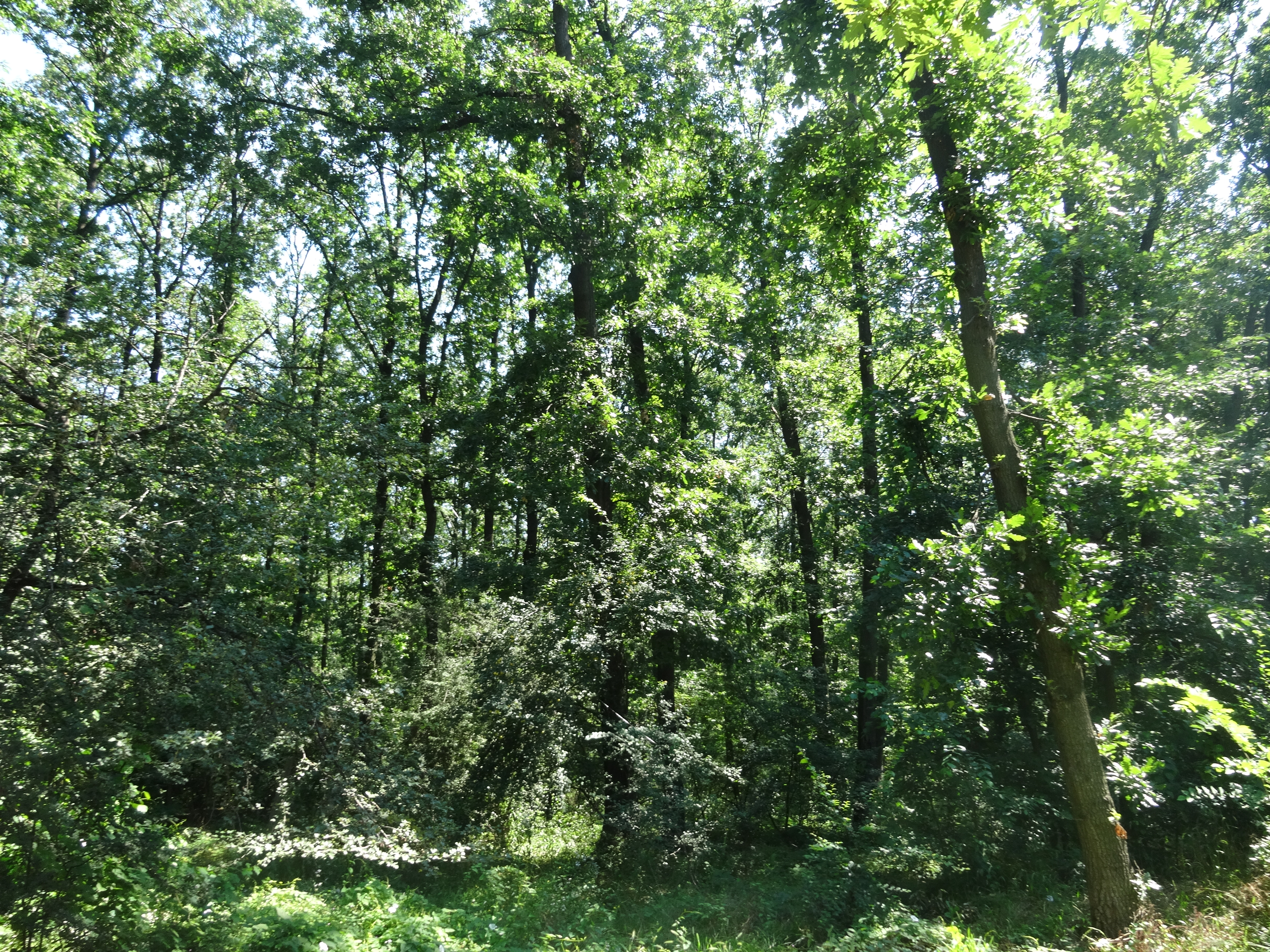
Lipovička šuma, Šuma, 11 Lipovica Forest
- Липовичка шума / Lipovička šuma
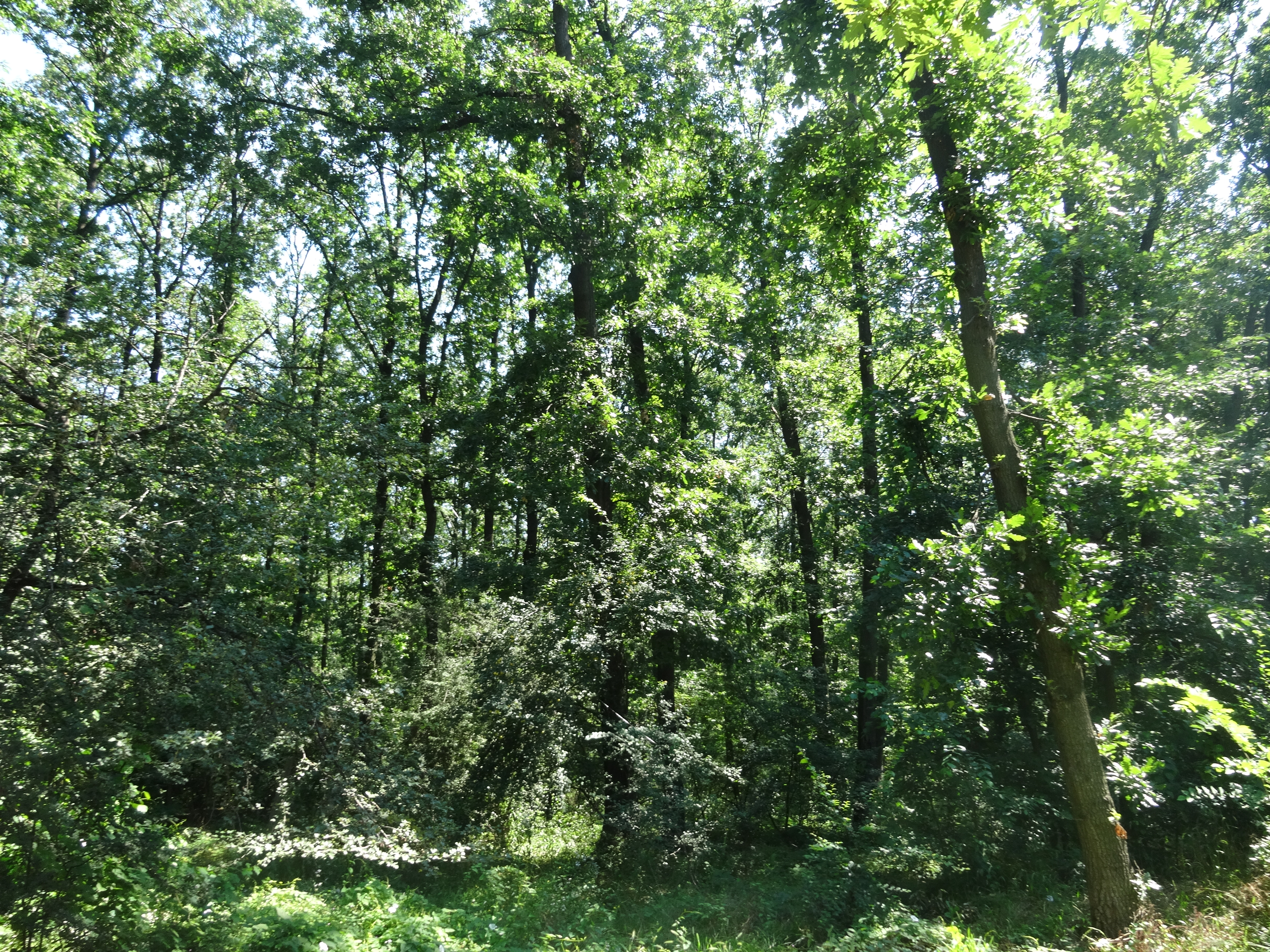
- Interactive map of Lipovička šuma, Šuma, 11 Lipovica Forest
- Location: Sremcica, Belgrade
- Coordinates: 44°38′11″N 20°24′12″E
- Open: Open all year

Lipovica Forest (Serbian: Липовичка шума, romanized: Lipovička šuma, pronounced [lîpoʋitʃkaː ʃûma]), or only Lipovica (Serbian Cyrillic: Липовица), is a forest in the outer, metropolitan area of Belgrade, Serbia. It is located in Sremcica.

== Location ==
Lipovička šuma is located in the low Šumadija region, 20 kilometers south of downtown Belgrade. It covers the more or less forested area of over 30 km^{2} (12 sq mi), on the northern slopes of the Parcanski vis hill, 409-metre-high (1,342 ft) northernmost extension of the Kosmaj mountain and spreads from the Ibar Highway and the valley of the Beljanica river on the west and south-west, to the upper valleys of the Topčiderka and Ralja rivers on the east. All three rivers originate in the wood's area itself.

== Characteristics ==
The forested area is uninhabited. Several settlements developed on the borders of the forest: Meljak on the west, Guncati and Barajevo on the south-west and Ripanj on the north-east.

The wood itself covers an area of 12 km^{2} (4.6 sq mi). The most common species of trees are the oak types, Hungarian oak and Turkey oak, though the name of the woods means "small linden wood". The area is a popular picnic area for the citizens of Belgrade and many restaurants, villas, weekend houses and sport's fields are located in Lipovička šuma. Attractions include the famed motel Lipovička šuma on the Ibarska magistrala and the youth hostel, the court for the hurdle riding and a vast hunting area in the woods, with wildlife including roe deers, hares, pheasants and partridges.

The area is for the most part organized as an official but unfenced hunting ground of Lipovička Šuma. It spreads between the altitudes of 160 to 290 m (520 to 950 ft) and covers 12.53 km^{2} (4.84 sq mi). Roe deer and wild boar are being bred in the facility.

The section of the forest, called Dugi Rt, was declared a protected area by the city on 29 November 2013. It is protected for both the biological (forest complex) but also for the geomorphological and hudrological values. The specificities of the Dugi Rt ridge and the bed of the Sremačka river helped the development of the diverse flora and fauna. The entire forest is part of the Belgrade's outer green ring which mitigates the aftermaths of the bad urbanization.

A chemical center of the Yugoslav army was located in the woods and was used as a reservoir for the rocket fuel. It was a target during the 1999 NATO bombing of Serbia. Explosion and subsequent flames were visible kilometers away and caused an extensive damage to the woods itself which was burnt to the wide extent around the reservoir.

Lipovička šuma was the location of the headquarters of PTJ, the Counter-terrorist Units, a special operations and tactical unit of the Serbian Police. When PTJ merged into SAD, Special Anti-Terrorist Unit, in 2015, the SAJ took over the base.
