= Beljina, Barajevo =

Beljina Бељина
- Village
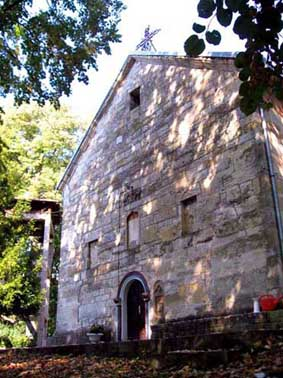
- Archangel Michael church in Beljina

- Location within Serbia
- Coordinates: 44°30′31″N 20°24′15″E
- Country: Serbia
- District: Šumadija
- Municipality: Barajevo

Population (2002)
  - Total: 810
- Time zone: UTC+1 (CET)
  - Summer (DST): UTC+2 (CEST)

Beljina (Serbian: Бељина) is a village in the municipality of Barajevo, Serbia. According to the 2002 census, the village has a population of 810 people.
