= Rucka (name) =

Rucka may refer to the following notable people:

- Greg Rucka (born 1969), American comic book writer
- Leo Rucka (1931–2016), American football player
- Rucka Rucka Ali (born 1987), Israeli-American rapper and comedian
