= Vesna Ranković =

Serbian politician

Vesna Ranković (Serbian Cyrillic: Весна Ранковић; born 1989) is a politician in Serbia. She has served in the National Assembly of Serbia since 2020 as a member of the Serbian Progressive Party.

== Private career ==
Ranković has a master's degree in spatial planning and lives in the Belgrade municipality of Barajevo.

== Politician ==
=== Municipal politics ===
Ranković appeared in the 110th position (out of 110) on the Progressive Party's electoral list for the City Assembly of Belgrade in the 2012 Serbian local elections. Election from this position was a mathematical impossibility; the list won thirty-seven mandates, and she was indeed not elected.

She later served on Barajevo's municipal council (i.e., the executive branch of the municipal government) from 16 September to 3 December 2015. She was chosen as the leader of the Progressive Party's municipal board in Barajevo in 2016 and has worked as an assistant to the mayor of the municipality.

=== Parliamentarian ===
Ranković received the 219th position out of 250 on the Progressive Party's Aleksandar Vučić – Serbia Is Winning list for the 2016 parliamentary election. This was too low a position for election to be a realistic prospect, and indeed she was not elected even as the list won a majority victory with 131 mandates. She was promoted to the 108th position on the party's Aleksandar Vučić — For Our Children list in the 2020 election and was elected when the list won a landslide majority with 188 mandates.

Ranković is a member of the assembly's European integration committee, a deputy member of the foreign affairs committee and the committee on constitutional and legislative issues, a member of Serbia's delegation to the Parliamentary Dimension of the Central European Initiative, the leader of Serbia's parliamentary friendship group with Nepal, and a member of the parliamentary friendship groups with Montenegro and Norway.
