= Arroyo (watercourse) =

Dry watercourse with flow after rain

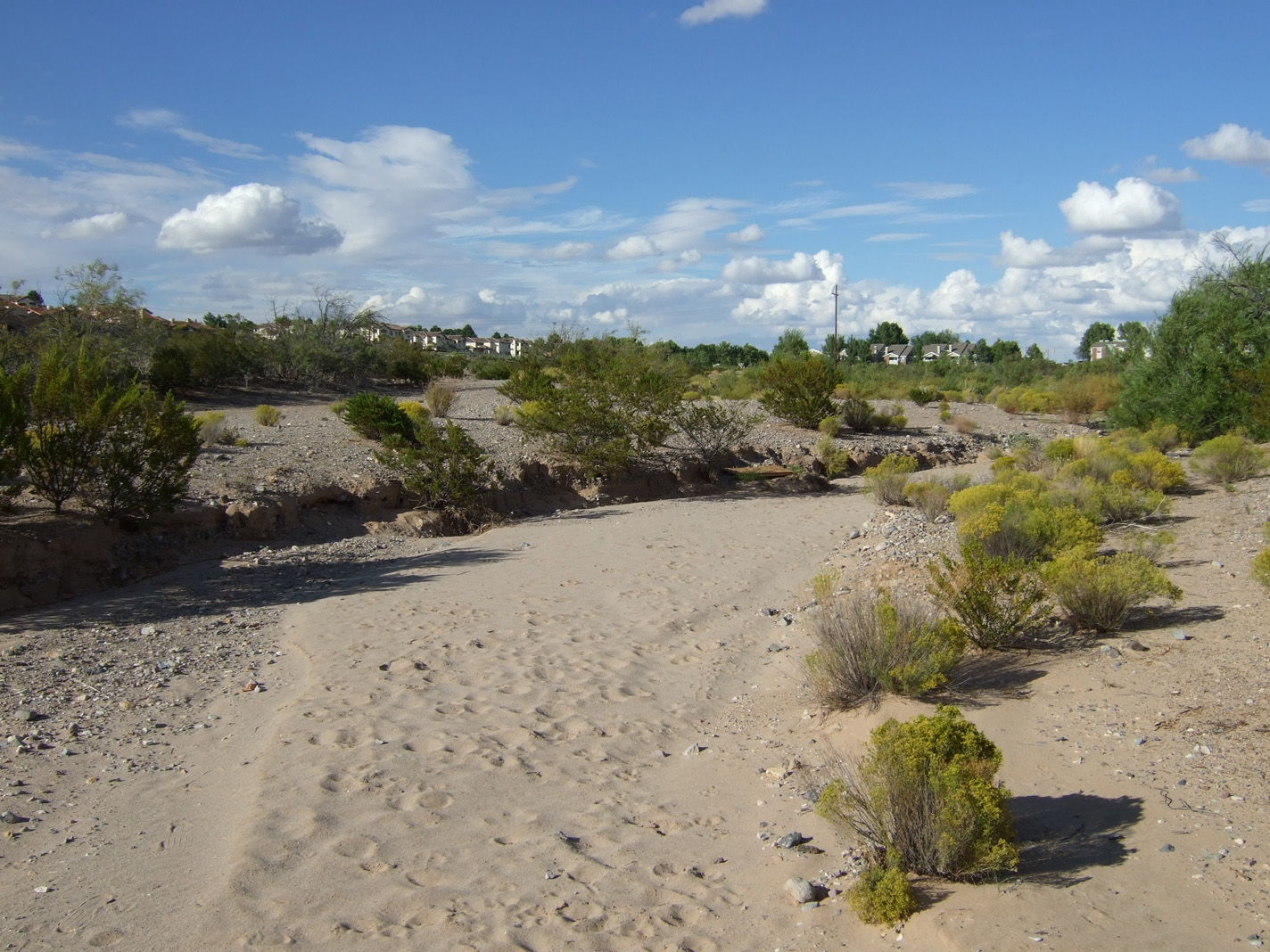
Las Cruces Arroyo in New Mexico

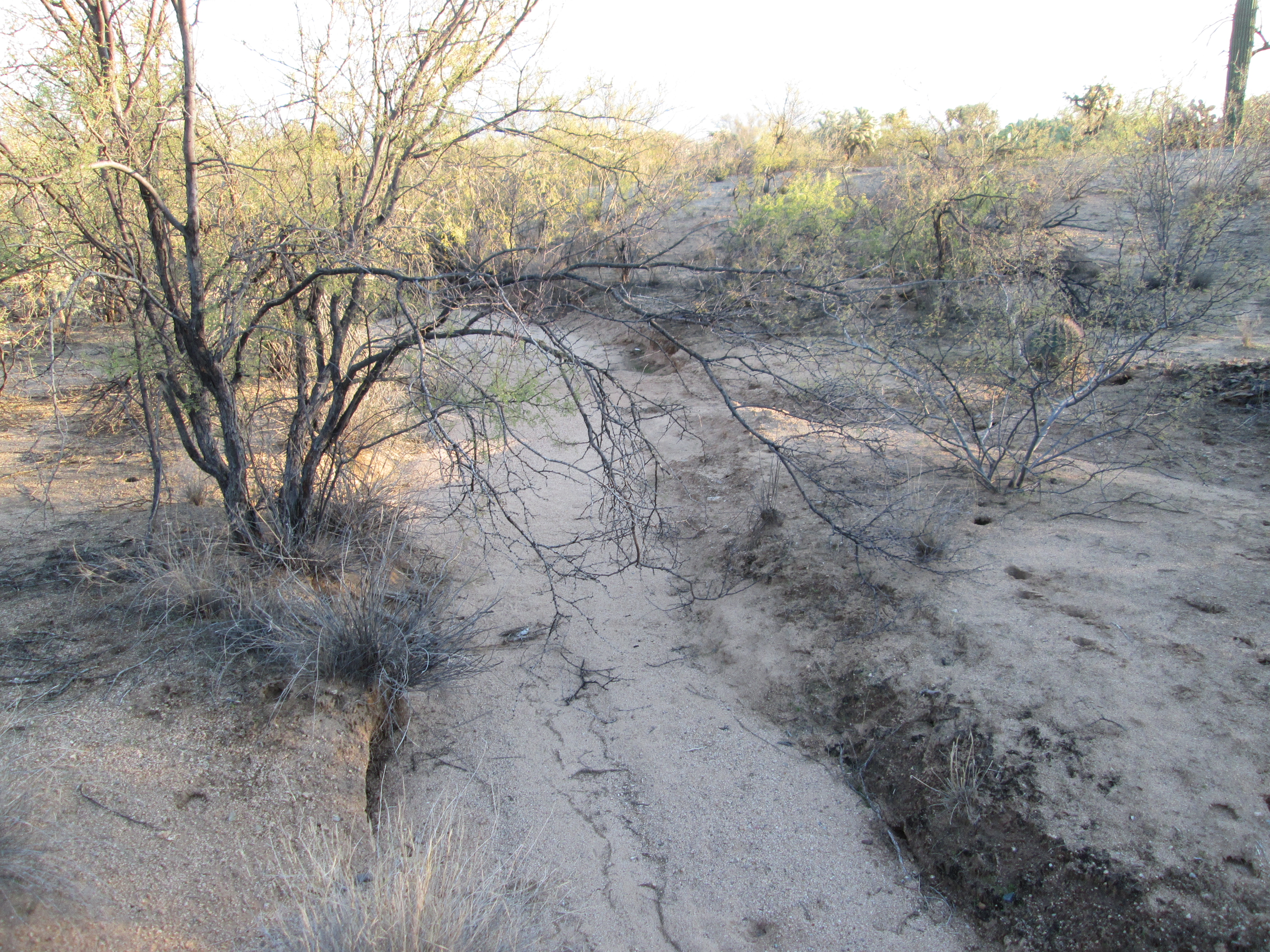
An arroyo in the Sonoran Desert of Arizona

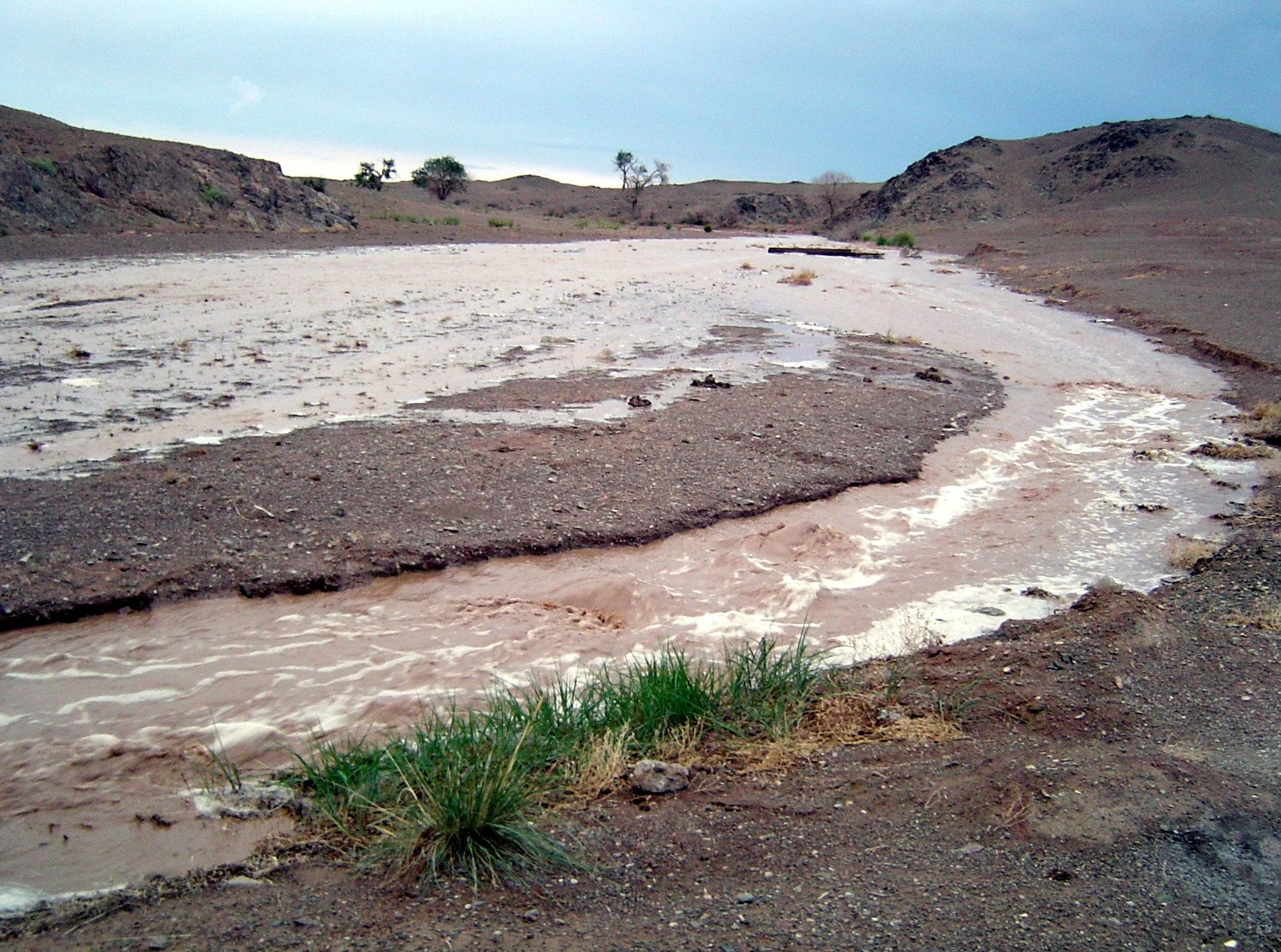
A flash flood hits a dry streambed in the Gobi Desert

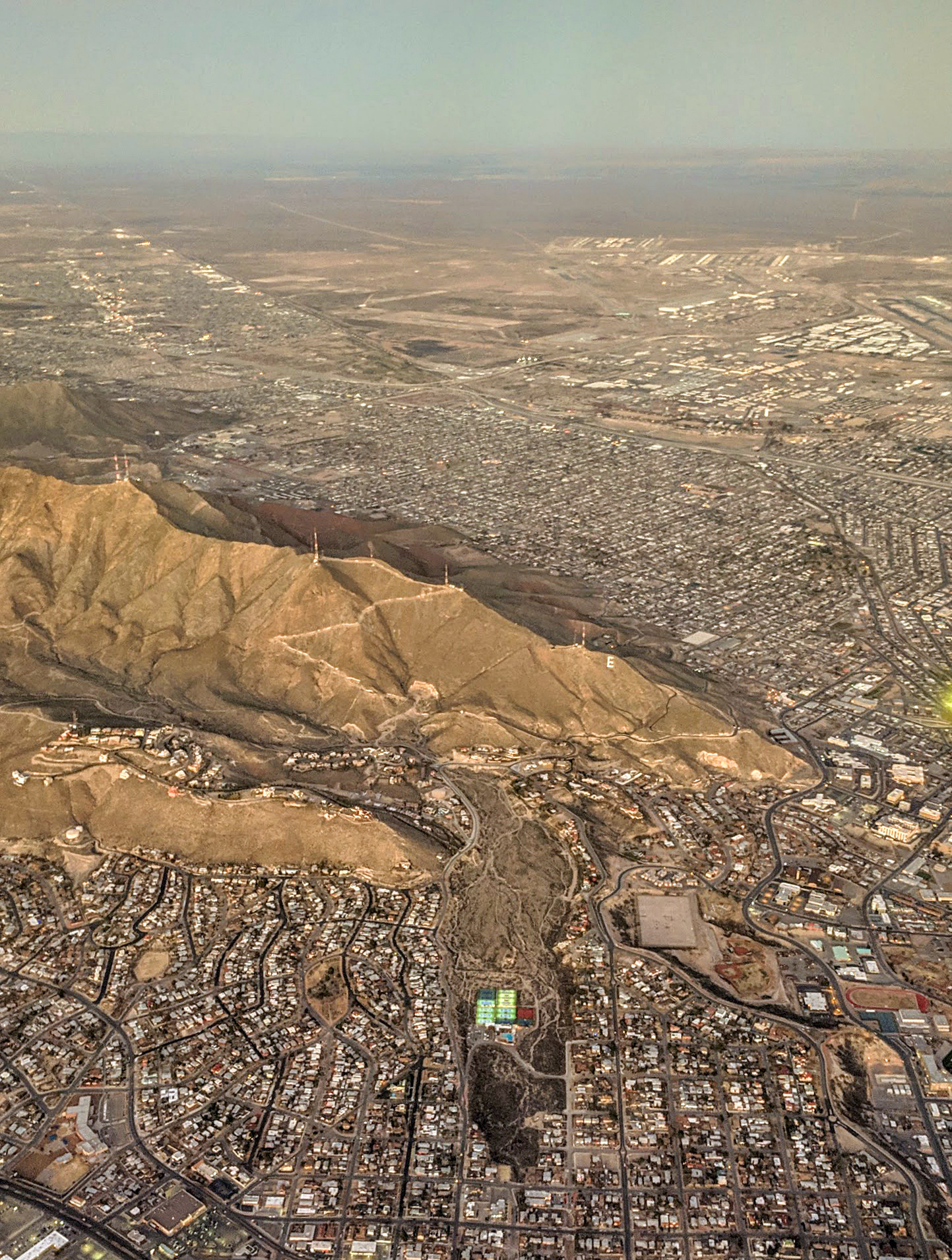
Aerial view of El Paso's Arroyo Park, or Billy Rogers Arroyo, providing a path for runoff of rain on the Franklin Mountains behind

An arroyo (/ə.ˈrɔɪ.oʊ/, from the Spanish arroyo (Spanish: [aˈroʝo], "brook") or wash is a dry watercourse that temporarily or seasonally fills and flows after sufficient rain. Flash floods are common in arroyos following thunderstorms. It is akin to the Catalan rambla, which stems from the Arabic rámla, "dry river".

Similar landforms are referred to as wadi (in North Africa and Western Asia), chapp in the Gobi, laagate in the Kalahari, donga in South Africa, nullah in India, fiumare in Italy, and dry valley in England.

The desert dry wash biome is restricted to the arroyos of the southwestern United States. Arroyos provide a water source to desert animals.

== Types and processes ==
Arroyos can be natural fluvial landforms or constructed flood control channels. The term usually applies to a sloped or mountainous terrain in xeric and desert climates. In addition: in many rural communities arroyos are also the principal transportation routes; and in many urban communities arroyos are also parks and recreational locations, often with linear multi-use bicycle, pedestrian, and equestrian trails. Flash flooding can cause the deep arroyos or deposition of sediment on flooded lands. This can lower the groundwater level of the surrounding area, making it unsuitable for agriculture. However a shallow water table lowered in desert arroyo valleys can reduce saline seeping and alkali deposits in the topsoil, making it suitable for irrigated farming.

=== Natural ===
The Doña Ana County Flood Commission in the U.S. state of New Mexico defines an arroyo as "a watercourse that conducts an intermittent or ephemeral flow, providing primary drainage for an area of land of 40 acres (160,000 m^{2}) or larger; or a watercourse which would be expected to flow in excess of one hundred cubic feet per second as the result of a 100 year storm event." Research has been conducted in the hydrological modeling relative to arroyos. Natural arroyos are made through the process known as arroyo-cutting. This occurs in arid regions, such as New Mexico, where heavy rains can lead to enlargement of rivers cutting into surrounding rock creating ravines which are dry under normal weather conditions. It is argued, however, whether these excessively stormy periods are the sole cause of arroyo-cutting as other factors such as long-term climate changes must also be taken into account. Further, overgrazing by livestock throughout the 20th century and today has removed vast amounts of surface vegetation which decreases ground infiltration of precipitation and increased runoff, increasing speed and energy of high flow rain events. Coupled with groundwater pumping this increases downcutting in arroyos as well. Arroyo cutting which occurred in the 1900s in the southwestern United States caused serious farming issues such as a lowered water table and the destruction of agriculture lands.

=== Constructed ===
In agricultural areas in climates needing irrigation, farmers traditionally relied on small constructed arroyos, acequias, zanjas or aqueduct channels and ditches for the distribution of water.

An example of larger constructed arroyos is in Albuquerque, New Mexico. There are several miles of open-air concrete lined drainage channels that drain an area into the main North Diversion Channel, a tributary of the Rio Grande joining upstream of Albuquerque. After the San Juan Project Water Treatment Plant here, the Rio Grande's flow exceeding that needed for the river's silvery minnow habitat is available for municipal water supply diversion. Signs are posted at the constructed arroyos warning to keep out due to danger of flash flooding, which can turn a dry channel into a roaring river in under two minutes, even when there is no rain in the local area. From 2017 to 2021, twelve people were killed by sudden flooding of drainage channels in Albuquerque, despite most residents being aware of the risk.

The Arroyo Seco and Los Angeles River are more famous examples in Southern California of former natural arroyo seasonal watercourses that became constructed open drainage system arroyos.

== See also ==
- Billabong
- Ravine
- Draw
- Wadi
