= Beljina =

Beljina Бељина
- Suburban settlement
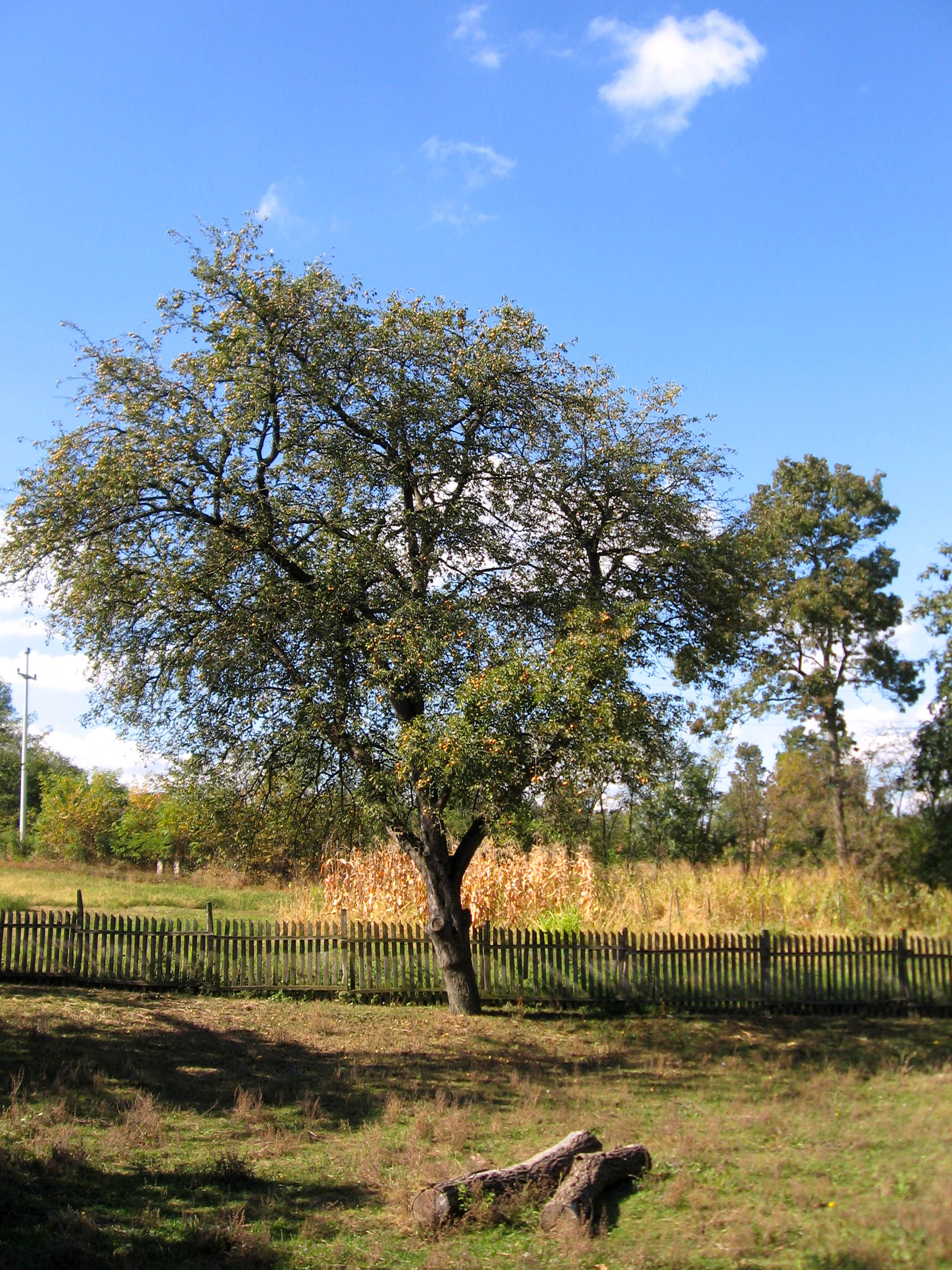
- A tree in Beljina

- Location of Beljina in Serbia
- Coordinates: 44°31′12″N 20°23′44″E
- Country: Serbia
- City: Belgrade
- Municipality: Barajevo

Area
  - Total: 10.11 km^{2} (3.90 sq mi)

Population (2011)
  - Total: 775
- Time zone: UTC+1 (CET)
  - Summer (DST): UTC+2 (CEST)
- Area code: 011
- Vehicle registration: BG
- RZS code: 703516

Beljina (Serbian Cyrillic: Бељина) is a suburban settlement of Belgrade, Serbia. It is located in the municipality of Barajevo. Beljina is a small rural settlement with 775 inhabitants as of 2011, located on the northeastern tip of the Kosmaj mountain, 12 km south of the municipal seat of Barajevo. In 1956 the municipality of Beljina was created, comprising villages of Beljina, Arnajevo, Manić and Rožanci, but already in 1957 the municipality was dissolved and annexed to the municipality of Barajevo.

Old section of the village, known as Čaršija in Beljina, is placed under the state protection as the spatial cultural-historical unit.

== Demographics ==
In 2011, the settlement contained 270 households with an average of 2.87 members. There were 228 families, with 87% of the population being adults and an average age of 46.2.

== Wildlife ==
By the 21st century, number of migratory European rollers in Serbia was reduced to some 20 nesting couples, where only few were recorded in Central Serbia and none in the central Šumadija region. The species was widespread by the mid-20th century, but was protected by the state in 1993. In order to try to repopulate the species, ornithologists placed bird houses on top of the trees in Beljina in 2015, but the attempt was unsuccessful. In 2017 the bird houses was moved to the village's utility poles, and rollers began nesting again, starting in 2018, in slowly growing numbers each year.

Historical population
Year	Pop.	±%
1948	977	—
1953	980	+0.3%
1961	954	−2.7%
1971	883	−7.4%
1981	892	+1.0%
1991	873	−2.1%
2002	810	−7.2%
2011	775	−4.3%
