= Avalski Venac =

Hypothetical Serbian Municipality

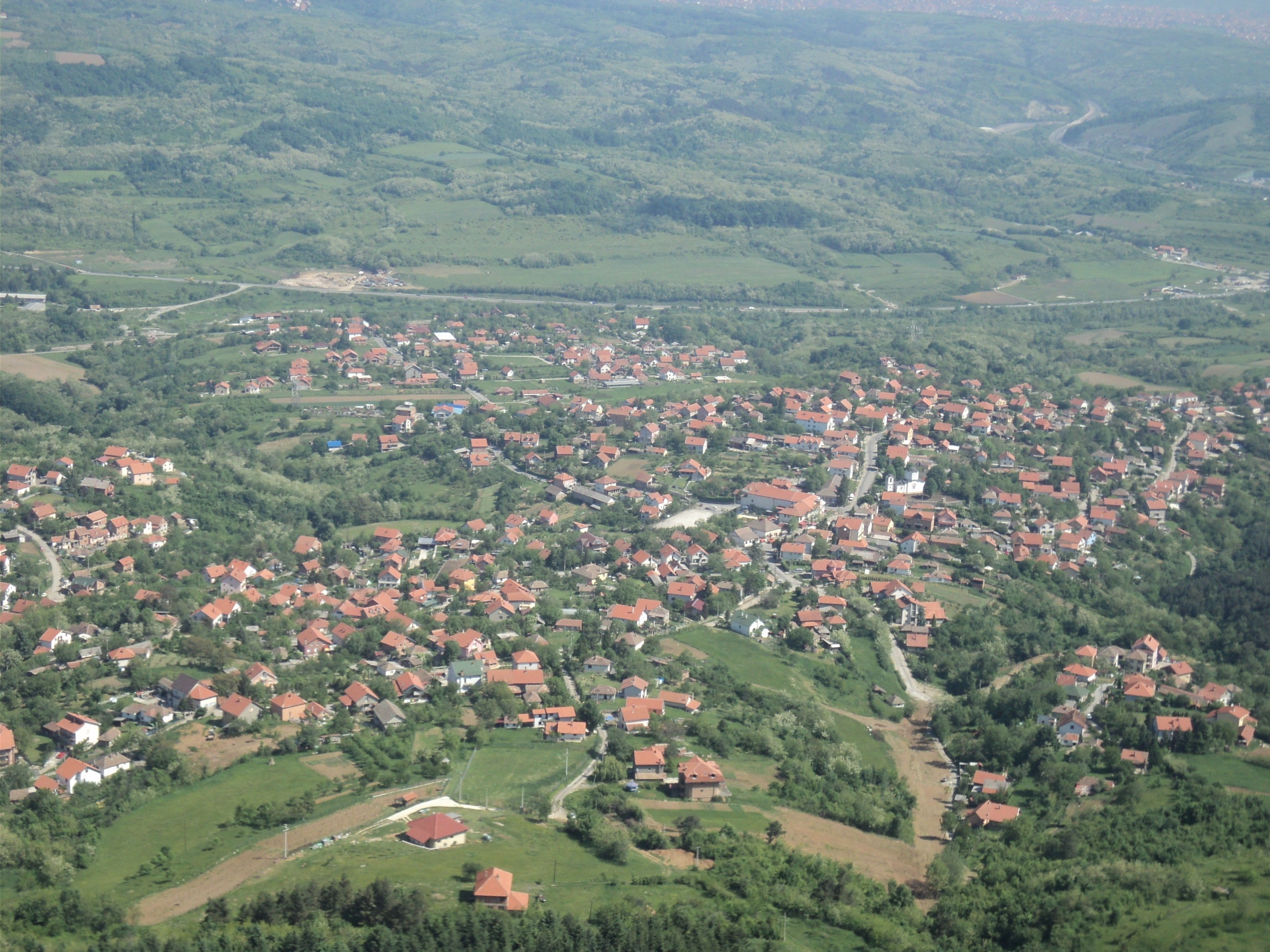
Beli Potok, prepared by the municipal government of Voždovac as the seat of the future Avalski Venac municipality in 2008, which by 2026 is still not created

Avalski Venac (Cyrillic: Авалски венац) is a proposed municipality of the City of Belgrade, the capital of Serbia.

== Movement ==
Movement for creation of the municipality began in 1996, and was enhanced since 2002 and successful campaigning for the re-creation of the municipality of Surčin, which split from the municipality of Zemun, almost 40 years after it was annexed to Zemun. Originally, the movement sought to re-create to former municipality of Ripanj, which was annexed to the municipality of Voždovac and now constitutes its southern part, which is at the most distant almost 40 km (25 mi) away from the municipal seat. It should constitute from the rural settlements of Ripanj, Beli Potok, Zuce and Pinosava, all in the municipality of Voždovac, but also including Vrčin, in the municipality of Grocka. All settlements are located on the slopes of the Avala mountain, distant from their municipal seats and have similar communal problems, notably the notorious summer's water shortages. The combined population of the settlements is 27,556 by the 2022 census of population.

== Official proceedings ==
In September 2007 an official motion was started by the municipality of Voždovac to create new municipality and in October 2007 municipal assembly began construction of the building in central Beli Potok which would serve as an outer representation of the assembly and the future municipal seat if new municipality is to be created. The new administrative center was finished in April 2008. President of the municipal assembly Goran Lukačević said that the opinions of the population will ensue soon and that inhabitants of the neighborhood of Resnik in the municipality of Rakovica will be also asked to join the new municipality.

At the time, the motion was supported by the local administration headed by the Democratic Party at the time, but not by the members of the same party on the city level. The new municipality was also proposed by the political party G17 Plus in 2010 and New Party in 2015. The coalition Moramo, during the April 2022 campaign for the local elections in Belgrade, favored formation of the municipality, but also of several others.

After the change in city government in 2014, a commission for the change of the City Statute was formed. It was announced in 2015 and 2016 that the new statute will also deal with the administrative division, but as of October 2017 nothing changed. In October 2017, Belgrade's Administrative secretariat disclosed that the notions for the creation of the municipalities of Dunavski Venac, Avalski Venac and Kaluđerica were applied, but that all three were in a discord with the City statute.

== See also ==
- List of former and proposed municipalities of Belgrade
