= Arnajevo =

Arnajevo Арнајево
- Suburban Settlement
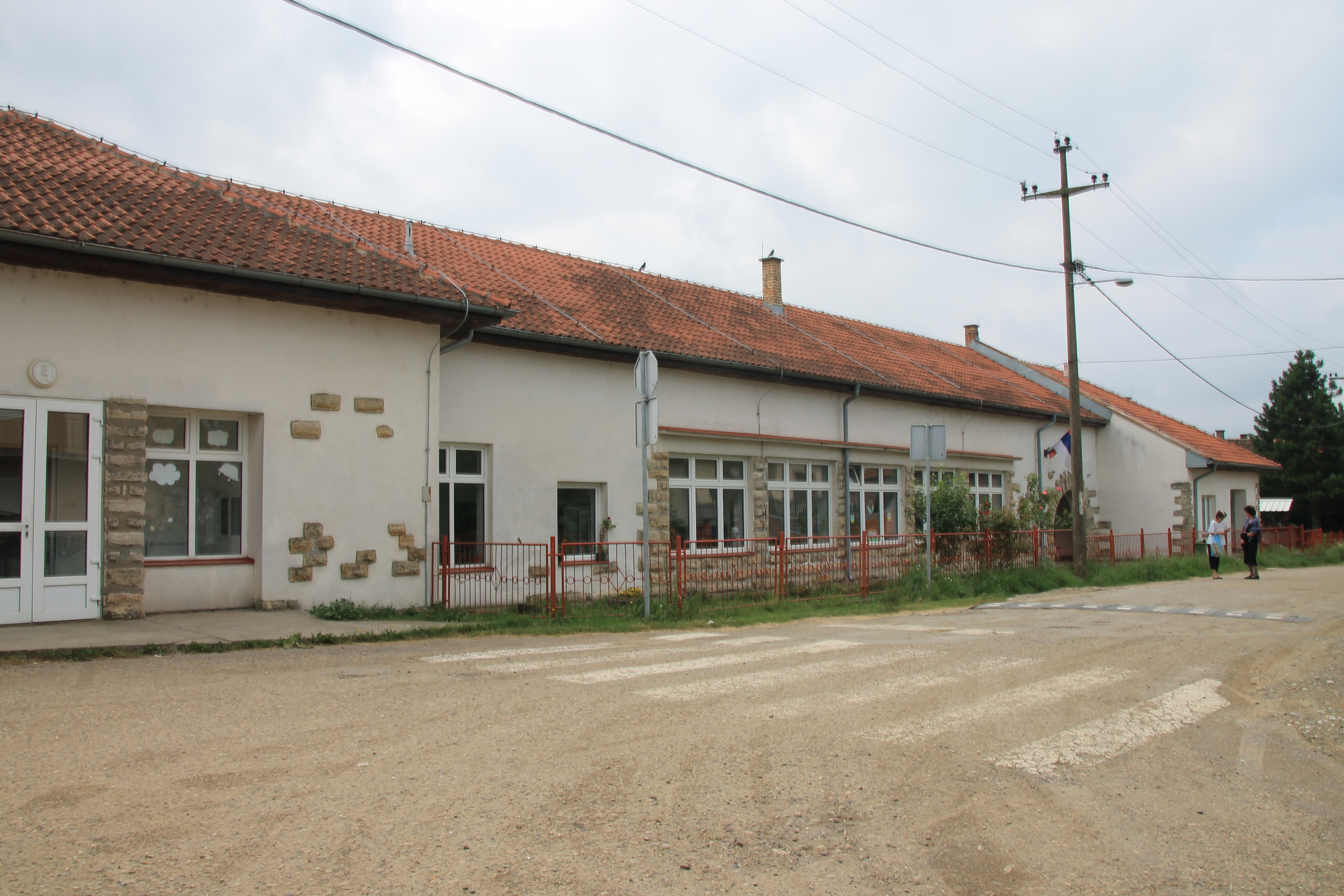
- Elementary school in Arnajevo

- Location of Arnajevo in Serbia
- Coordinates: 44.5011°N 20.3756°E
- Country: Serbia
- City: Belgrade
- Municipality: Barajevo

Area
  - Total: 9.71 km^{2} (3.75 sq mi)

Population (2011)
  - Total: 753
- Time zone: UTC+1 (CET)
  - Summer (DST): UTC+2 (CEST)
- Area code: 011
- Vehicle registration: BG
- RZS code: 703486

Arnajevo (Serbian Cyrillic: Арнајево) is a suburban settlement of Belgrade, the capital of Serbia. It is located in the municipality of Barajevo. Its population in 2011 was 753.

Arnajevo is located in the northwestern tip of the municipality, east of the village of Stepojevac. In 1956–57, Arnajevo was part of the municipality of Beljina, which in 1957 merged into the municipality of Barajevo.

== Demographics ==
It is a small, depopulating rural settlement. In 2011, the village contained 239 households with an average of 3.15 members. There were 212 families, with 82% of the population being adults and an average age of 44.4. It had a population of 853 according to Census 2002. In 1991, the settlement had 1,005 inhabitants.

Historical population
| Year | Pop. | ±% |
|---|---|---|
| 1948 | 1,113 | — |
| 1953 | 1,144 | +2.8% |
| 1961 | 1,094 | −4.4% |
| 1971 | 1,032 | −5.7% |
| 1981 | 1,034 | +0.2% |
| 1991 | 1,005 | −2.8% |
| 2002 | 853 | −15.1% |
| 2011 | 753 | −11.7% |
