= Baćevac =

Baćevac Баћевац
- Suburban settlement
- Location of Baćevac in Serbia
- Coordinates: 44°35′06″N 20°22′35″E
- Country: Serbia
- City: Belgrade
- Municipality: Barajevo

Area
  - Total: 15.71 km^{2} (6.07 sq mi)

Population (2011)
  - Total: 1,942
- Time zone: UTC+1 (CET)
  - Summer (DST): UTC+2 (CEST)
- Area code: 011
- Vehicle registration: BG
- RZS code: 703508

Baćevac (Serbian Cyrillic: Баћевац) is a suburban settlement of Belgrade, Serbia. It is located in the municipality of Barajevo. Its population in 2011 was 1,942.

Baćevac is located west of the municipal center of Barajevo, four kilometers east of the major road in western Serbia, Ibarska magistrala (Highway of Ibar) and it is a regional crossroad itself.

== Demographics ==
Historical population
Year	Pop.	±%
1948	1,067	—
1953	1,110	+4.0%
1961	1,031	−7.1%
1971	971	−5.8%
1981	1,092	+12.5%
1991	1,220	+11.7%
2002	1,624	+33.1%
2011	1,942	+19.6%

Baćevac is a rural settlement whose population, thanks to the proximity of the highway and the city of Belgrade itself, grew one third between the censuses of 1991 and 2002 (1,220 and 1,624 inhabitants, respectively). In 2011, the settlement contained 705 households with an average of 2.75 members. There were 584 families, with 84% of the population being adults and an average age of 44.9.

== Campground ==
One of only three officially designated campsites in Belgrade by 2018 is located in Baćevac. It is situated within the complex of the ethno-household "Zornić's House".
