= Trebež (Barajevo) =

- city
- Location within Serbia
- Coordinates: 44°38′22″N 20°25′35″E
- Country: Serbia
- District: Belgrade
- Municipality: Barajevo

Population (2002)
  - Total: 8,325
- Time zone: UTC+1 (CET)
  - Summer (DST): UTC+2 (CEST)

Trebež is a suburban settlement of Belgrade, the capital of Serbia. It is located in the municipality of Barajevo. According to the 2002 census, the village has a population of 8,325 people.
