= Boždarevac =

- Suburban settlement
- Location within Serbia
- Coordinates: 44°33′52″N 20°24′04″E
- Country: Serbia

Area
  - Total: 9.65 km^{2} (3.73 sq mi)
- Time zone: UTC+1 (CET)
  - Summer (DST): UTC+2 (CEST)

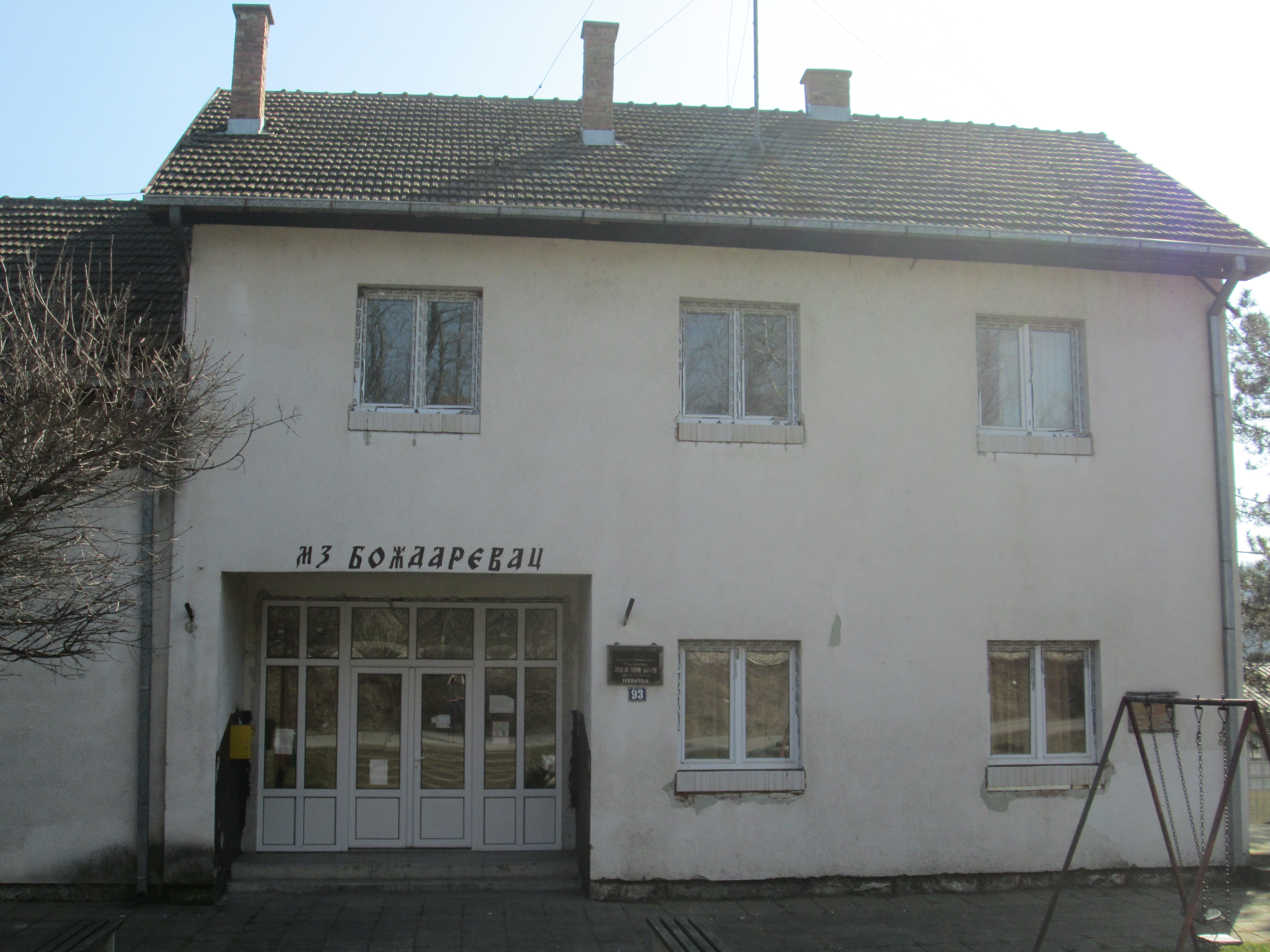
Community Center, Boždarevac

Boždarevac (Serbian Cyrillic: Бождаревац) is a suburban settlement of Belgrade, Serbia. It is located in the municipality of Barajevo.

Boždarevac (often misspelled Božidarevac) developed on the northwestern slopes of the Kosmaj mountain, on the Beljanica river. It is located in the central part of the municipality, some 6 km southwest of the municipal seat of Barajevo, on the Belgrade-Bar railway. The settlement is also a regional crossroad.

It is a small, rural settlement with a population of 1,218 (Census 2002).
