= List of villages in Serbia and Montenegro =

List of villages in Serbia and Montenegro may refer to:

- List of populated places in Serbia
- List of populated places in Montenegro
