= Špiljani =

Špiljani Шпиљани
- Village (Selo)
- Nickname: sr
- Location within Serbia
- Coordinates: 42°55′N 20°20′E
- Country: Serbia
- District: Raška District
- Municipality: Tutin
- Elevation: 971 m (3,186 ft)

Population (2011)
  - Total: 275
- Time zone: UTC+1 (CET)
  - Summer (DST): UTC+2 (CEST)

Špiljani (Serbian Cyrillic: Шпиљани) is a village located in the municipality of Tutin, southwestern Serbia. According to the 2011 census, the village has a population of 275 inhabitants. A border crossing between Serbia and Montenegro is located in the village.
