= Vranić, Serbia =

Vranić
- Suburban settlement
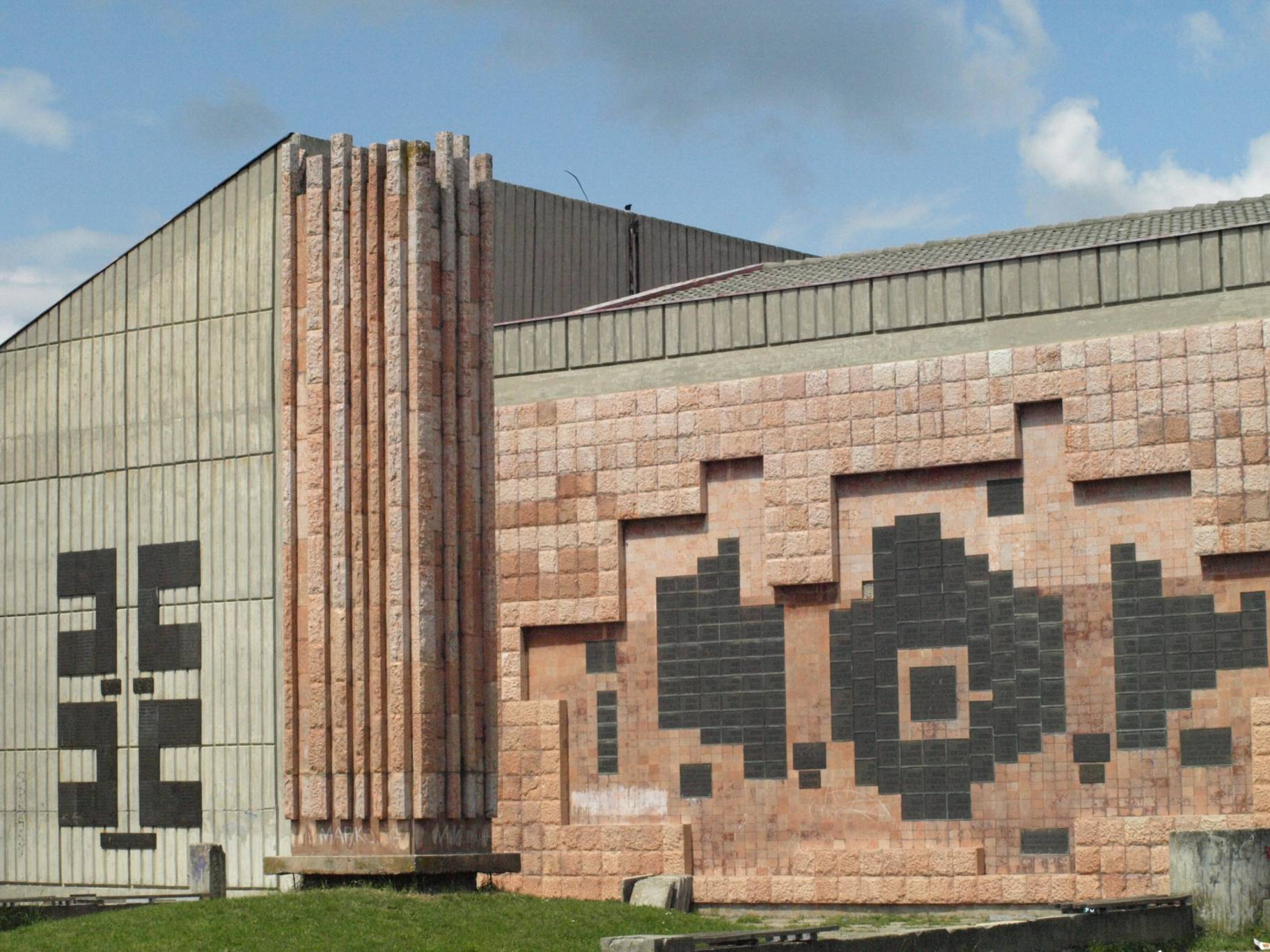
- Memorial home in Vranić

- Location within Serbia
- Coordinates: 44°36′05″N 20°19′34″E
- Country: Serbia

Area
  - Total: 26.58 km^{2} (10.26 sq mi)

Population (2011)
  - Total: 4,233
  - Density: 159.3/km^{2} (412.5/sq mi)
- Time zone: UTC+1 (CET)
  - Summer (DST): UTC+2 (CEST)

Vranić (Serbian: Вранић) is a suburban settlement of Belgrade, Serbia. It is located in the municipality of Barajevo. Vranić is the westernmost settlement in the municipality, located 2 km (1.2 mi) east of the Ibarska magistrala, but as the settlement grew, it reached the highway. Vranić was part of the municipality of Umka which was abolished in 1960 and divided between the municipalities of Čukarica and Barajevo (Vranić and Meljak).

It is a rural settlement and, thanks to the proximity of the highway, in the last three decades Vranić has developed into the second most populous settlement in the municipality after the municipal seat of Barajevo. As Vranić grew, it developed several outer hamlets, like Rašića Kraj and Taraiš. The population of Vranić in 2011 was 4,233.

== History ==
The wooden church in Vranić was built in 1823. Under its foundation, an archeological find was discovered, estimated to be 5,000 years old. It was built on the foundations of the older church from the 18th century, which had a role in preparations and organization of the rebellions of Koča's Frontier rebellion (1788) and First Serbian Uprising (1804). The church has rectangular base, it was built from oak logs and roofed with wood shingles. With iconostasis and wall in narthex, the interior is divided in three rooms. The church is known for its painted and exquisitely ornamented, carved western doors. The church hosts some 50 artifacts, including icons made by unknown artists but also by the icon painters Ilija Petrović and Nikola Janković, artistic crafts and books from the 17th century, etc. One of the most valuable items is the large carved cross of Hadži-Ruvim from 1800. Being one of the oldest surviving objects of this kind in Serbia, the log cabin was protected by the law as the cultural monument.

During World War II in night of October 20-21 1943 Chetniks killed 67 villagers including 15 children as part of terror against Yugoslav Partisan supporters.

Historical population
Year	Pop.	±%
1921	2,565	—
1948	2,991	+16.6%
1953	3,051	+2.0%
1961	2,868	−6.0%
1971	2,625	−8.5%
1981	3,044	+16.0%
1991	3,225	+5.9%
2002	3,899	+20.9%
2011	4,233	+8.6%

== Notable people ==
- Mihailo Pejić (1750–1812), archpriest in Zemun
