= Guncati =

Guncati Гунцати
- Suburban settlement
- Location within Serbia
- Coordinates: 44°36′08″N 20°23′58″E
- Country: Serbia
- District: Šumadija
- Municipality: Barajevo

Area
  - Total: 11.75 km^{2} (4.54 sq mi)

Population (2011)
  - Total: 2,752
  - Density: 234.2/km^{2} (606.6/sq mi)
- Time zone: UTC+1 (CET)
  - Summer (DST): UTC+2 (CEST)

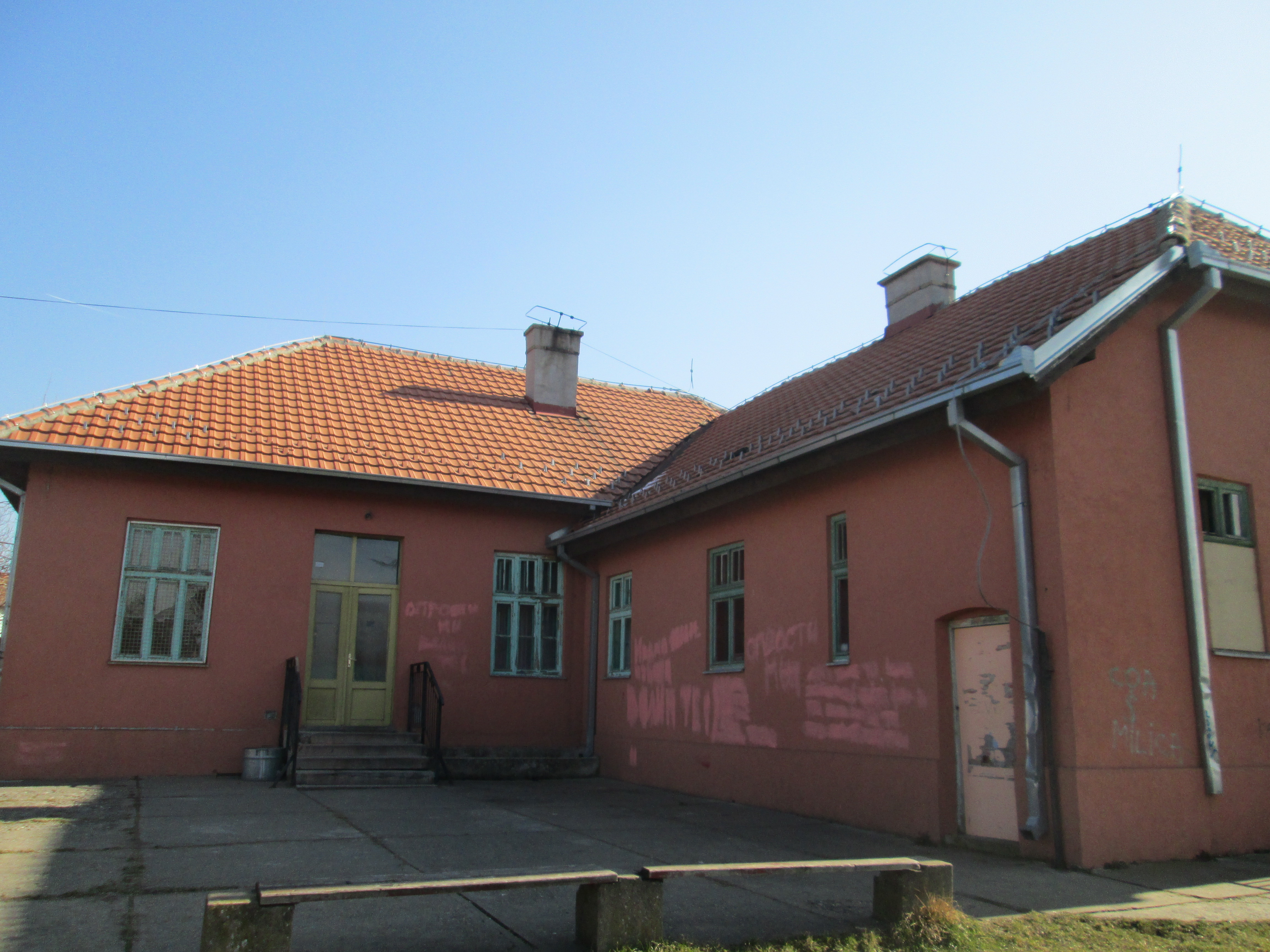
Primary school in Guncati

Guncati (Serbian Cyrillic: Гунцати) is a suburban settlement of Belgrade, Serbia. It is located in the municipality of Barajevo. According to the 2011 census, the village has a population of 2,752 people.

Guncati is located west of the municipal seat of Barajevo, halfway between the Belgrade–Bar railway and the Ibar Highway.

It is a rural settlement with a steady population growth: from 1,718 (Census 1991) to 2,752 (Census 2011).
