= Guberevac =

Guberevac Губеревац
- Village
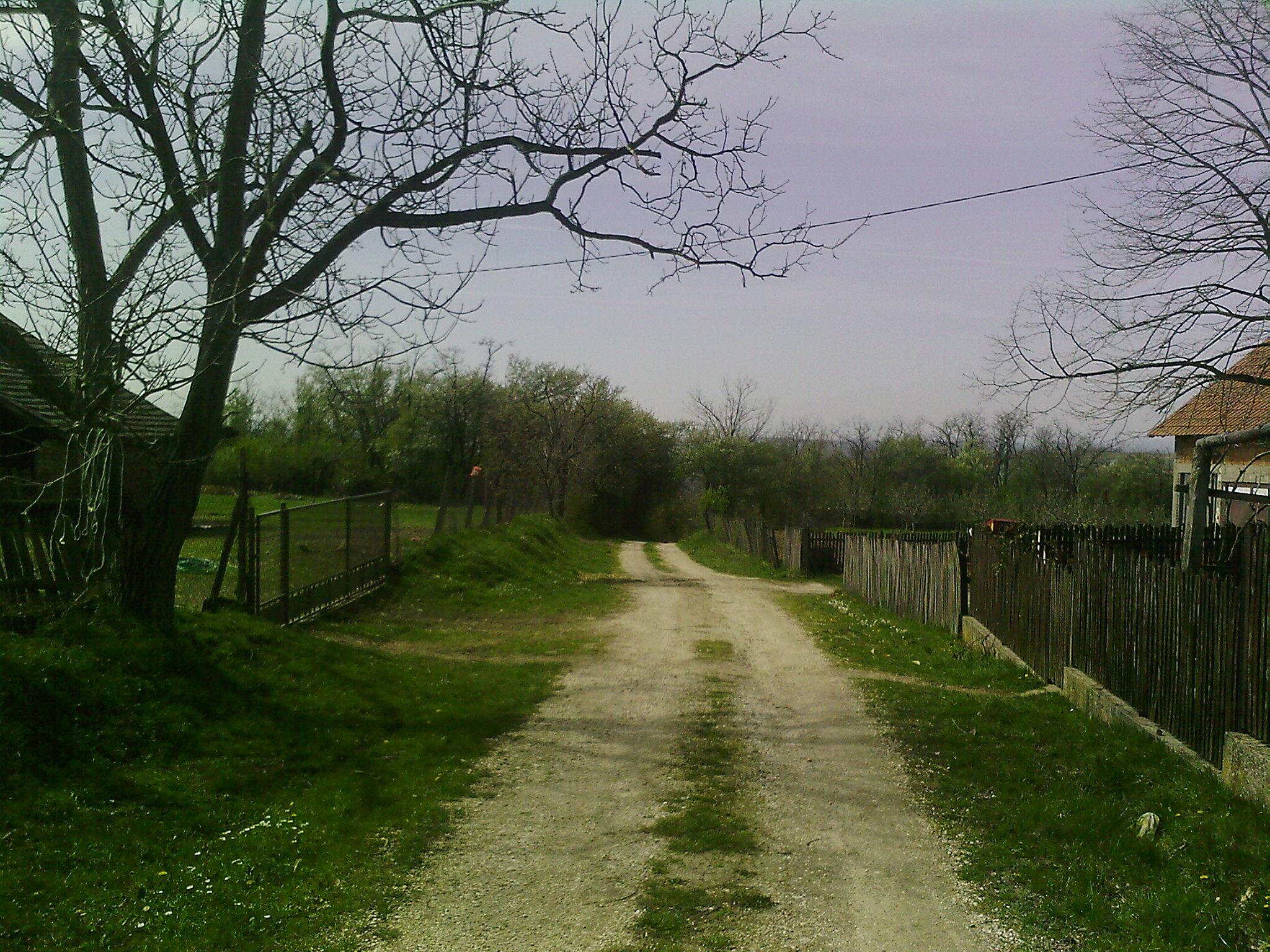

- Location within Serbia
- Coordinates: 44°32′14″N 20°28′1″E
- Country: Serbia
- District: Belgrade District
- Municipality: Sopot

Population (2022)
  - Total: ▼464
- Time zone: UTC+1 (CET)
  - Summer (DST): UTC+2 (CEST)

Guberevac (Serbian Cyrillic: Губеревац) is a village in the municipality of Sopot, Serbia. According to the 2022 census, the village has a population of 464 people.
