= Rožanci =

- Suburban settlement
- Location within Serbia
- Coordinates: 44°29′07″N 20°23′06″E
- Country: Serbia

Area
  - Total: 11.59 km^{2} (4.47 sq mi)
- Time zone: UTC+1 (CET)
  - Summer (DST): UTC+2 (CEST)

Rožanci (Serbian Cyrillic: Рожанци) is a suburban settlement of Belgrade, the capital of Serbia. It is located in the municipality of Barajevo.

Rožanci is located in the southern part of the municipality. It is a small, depopulating rural settlement. With a population of 523 (Census 2002), it is the least populous settlement in the municipality.

In 1956–57, Rožanci was part of the municipality of Beljina, which in 1957 merged into the municipality of Barajevo.
