= Manić =

- Suburban settlement
- Location within Serbia
- Coordinates: 44°30′43″N 20°25′59″E
- Country: Serbia

Area
  - Total: 7.39 km^{2} (2.85 sq mi)
- Time zone: UTC+1 (CET)
  - Summer (DST): UTC+2 (CEST)

Manić (Serbian Cyrillic: Манић) is a suburban settlement of Belgrade, Serbia. It is located in the municipality of Barajevo.

Manić developed on the western slopes of the Kosmaj mountain. It is located in the southeastern tip of the Barajevo municipality, south of the municipal center of Barajevo.

It's a small rural settlement, one of the least populous in the municipality, with a population of 551 (Census 2002)

There are two karstic caves close to the village, called Slatinski Točak and Pantićeva Pećina ("saline seep wheel" and "Pantić cave").
