= Bregovi =

- Village (Selo)
- Location within Serbia
- Coordinates: 42°55′39″N 20°21′21″E
- Country: Serbia
- District: Raška District
- Municipality: Tutin

Population (2002)
  - Total: 57
- Time zone: UTC+1 (CET)
  - Summer (DST): UTC+2 (CEST)

Bregovi (Serbian: Брегови) is a village in the municipality of Tutin, Serbia. According to the 2022 census, the village has a population of 42 people.
