= Saline seep =

A saline seep is seep of saline water, with an area of alkali salt crystals that form when the salty water reaches the surface and evaporates. Various types of water movement form saline seeps, including capillary action from a water table under the surface, and a water table being brought to the surface in a flow.

== Habitat ==
Biota adapted to saline conditions, often endemic, thrive in the specialized habitat.

== Agriculture ==
Saline seeps are considered detrimental for agriculture, as they may reduce yields and restrict growth.

== See also ==
- Salinity
- Soil salinity
- Soil salination
- Brackish water
- Spring (hydrosphere)
