= Umka =

Umka Умка
- Suburban settlement
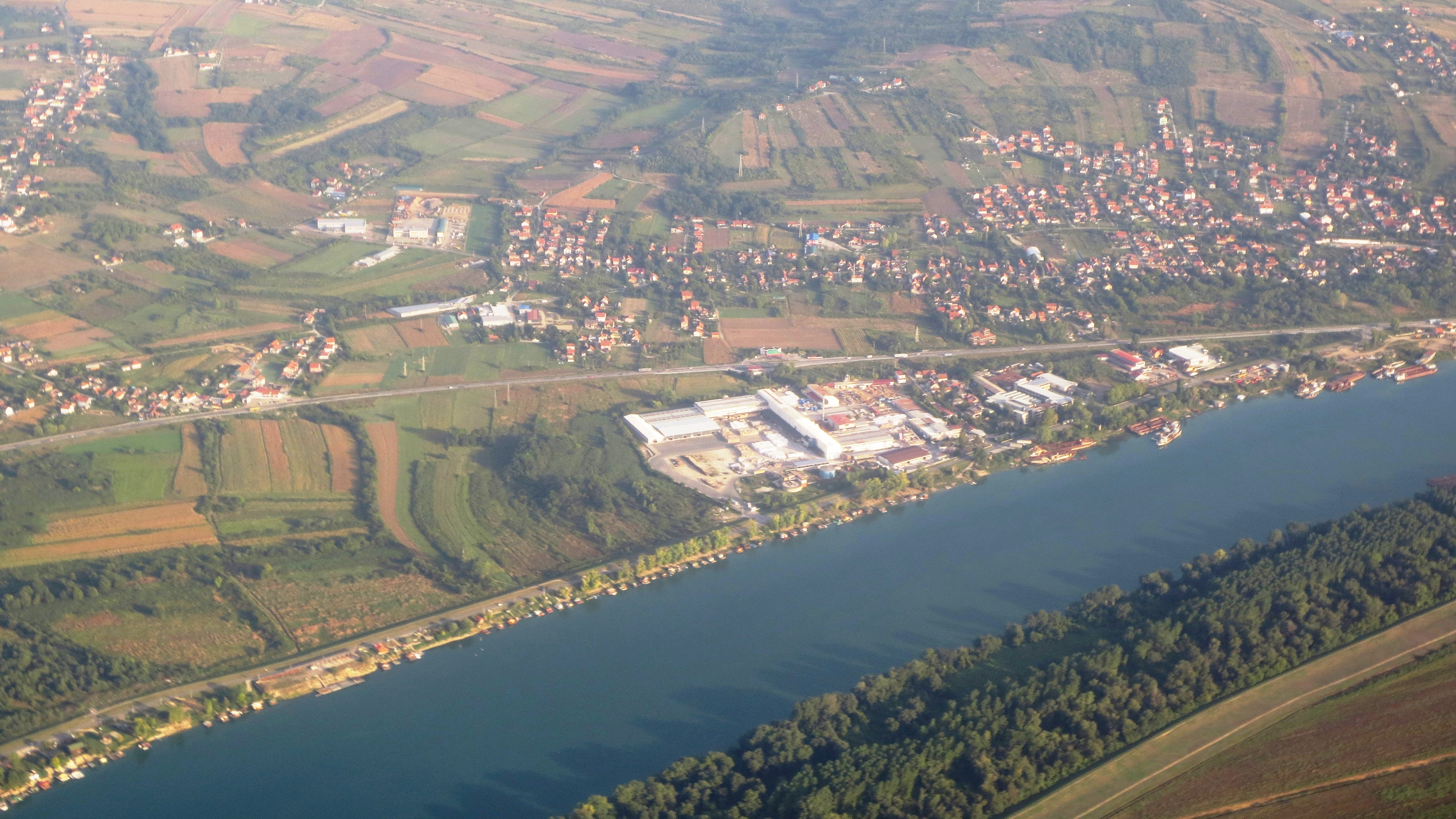
- Aerial view on Umka

- Location within Serbia
- Coordinates: 44.678092°N 20.306418°E
- Country: Serbia
- Region: Belgrade
- Municipality: Čukarica

Area
  - Total: 10.38 km^{2} (4.01 sq mi)

Population (2011)
  - Total: 5,272
  - Density: 507.9/km^{2} (1,315/sq mi)
- Time zone: UTC+1 (CET)
  - Summer (DST): UTC+2 (CEST)
- Postal code: 11260
- Area code: +381(0)11
- Car plates: BG

Umka (Serbian Cyrillic: Умка) is a suburban settlement of Belgrade, Serbia. It is located in the municipality of Čukarica. The settlement is notorious for the soil creep, so much that the apocryphal classified "Home for sale [in Umka], low mileage" entered the colloquial language.

== Location ==
Umka is located 22 km (14 mi) south-west of Belgrade, on the right bank of the Sava river, close to river's 22 km (14 mi). It is a crossroads on the IB-26 highway, with roads connecting it with another important highway to the east, the Ibar highway.

== Etymology ==
Umka was formerly called Humka, with humka meaning mound, knoll in Serbian language.

== Administration ==
Umka was a separate municipality, comprising surrounding villages of Rucka and Pećani which had a population 3,044 by the 1953 census. It was later enlarged with several surrounding villages, but the municipality was ultimately dissolved in 1960 and divided between Čukarica (Umka, Rucka and Pećani) and Barajevo (Meljak and Vranić).

== Geography ==
One of the characteristics of the Belgrade city terrain is mass wasting. On the territory covered by the General Urban Plan there are 1,155 recorded mass wasting points, out of which 602 are active and 248 are labeled as the "high risk". They cover almost 30% of the city territory. Downhill creeps are located on the slopes above the rivers, mostly on the clay or loam soils, inclined between 7 and 20 degrees and Umka, especially its neighborhood of Duboko, is one of the largest and most active. The creep stretches into the municipality of Obrenovac.

The creep in Umka became active in the early 19th century, as the settlement expanded to the unstable downhill. The creep itself is caused by the geological structure and proximity of the Sava. The settlement Duboko, on the creep, developed in the 1960s. It is unevenly constructed, with over 500 houses and other structures. Historically, the largest movements of the land occurred in 1914, 1941, 1978, 1982 and 2005. The creep itself is triangularly shaped, on the 900 m (3,000 ft) long slope, 1,450 m (4,760 ft) wide at the base, with the average inclination of 9 degrees. It covers an area of 100 ha (250 acres) and is 14 m (46 ft) deep on average.

The mass wasting causes the damages on the houses and the freeway which sink and get ruptured constantly. Damages are being repaired and patched but the massive project of stopping down the terrain is found to be too expensive. As the houses would lean on one side, the residents themselves were digging down the opposite side, leveling the objects. However, after the next massive rainy seasons, the process would continue. In the 1950s, the channels were dug for collecting the atmospheric precipitation from the slopes of the Lipik hill, conducting it down to the Obrenovac Road. There, several culverts were built below the road to conduct the water into the Sava. However, the system wasn't maintained and in time the mass wasting accelerated.

Several projects from the 1960s to the 1980s, aggravated the problem. The waterworks system was built, but not the sewage system. First major damages on the houses were recorded after the waterworks was finished. Downstream from Duboko, the Belgrade's water treatment facility was built in the 1980s, in Makiš, which also had a negative effect on the mass wasting. On its side closest to the river, the freeway is being patched every year, so the asphalt concrete is several meters thick in some sections.

It caused the problem for the route of the future A2 motorway, as the Belgrade City government planned to conduct the road on the left bank of the Sava, in the flat Syrmia region, bypassing the mass wasting area, while the government of Serbia pushed the right bank route. Ensuing debate became highly political and resulted in open clash between the Belgrade's mayor Nenad Bogdanović and Serbian minister for capital investments Velimir Ilić in 2006. In the end, in March 2017 the construction of the motorway through Syrmia began. The projected cost of repairing Duboko is over 30 million euros. The most likely process would be a massive filling up of the area with stone, which would shift the river current from the right side, where it erodes the creep, to the left, Syrmian side.

The municipality tried to relocate the population to Ostružnica, but the locality where the new settlement was to be built had numerous ownership problems, so the idea was dropped. In January 2020, the government declared public interest in this matter. Based on his, the expropriation of the privately owned parcels in Duboko began in January 2021, as the first phase of fixing the mass wasting problem. In July 2022, the government announced plans for the 14.8 kilometres (9.2 mi) long " fast thoroughfare", which will connect the Belgrade bypass at Ostružnica, to the Miloš the Great Motorway at Obrenovac. The project includes construction of the embankment in Duboko, fixing the mass wasting and regulation of the Sava's riverbed in this section.

The thoroughfare will effectively be built in the riverbed itself for 3 km (1.9 mi), along the parallel regulatory rampart-like structure, to create the ballast which will stabilize the creep.

== Population ==
Historical population
Year	Pop.	±%
1921	772	—
1948	2,058	+166.6%
1953	2,368	+15.1%
1961	3,731	+57.6%
1971	5,393	+44.5%
1981	5,618	+4.2%
1991	4,847	−13.7%
2002	5,292	+9.2%
2011	5,272	−0.4%

Umka is classified as an urban settlement (town), but many published sources refer to it as varošica (small town) even though statistically there is no such classification. The settlement experienced high growth of population after World War II, but has stagnated in the last four decades. New tourist settlement (vikend naselje) is built on the bank of the Sava. According to the 2011 census, the population of Umka was 5,272. Umka makes a continuous built-up urban area with the neighboring urban settlements of Pećani (pop. 562 in 2011) and Rucka (pop. 316).

== Economy ==
Umka was known for its beach on the Sava's bank, "the most beautiful beach on Sava". It was a busy port. In 1928, a railway tunnel was dug at Umka. It was part of the Belgrade-Dubrovnik narrow gauge railway. The 1,620 m (5,310 ft) long tunnel was later abandoned when the narrow gauge railways were discontinued and the gas pipeline was conducted through a part of it. As of 2018, the entrance into the tunnel is accessible.

The 1967–1972 construction of the massive Iron Gate I Hydroelectric Power Station on the Danube created the Lake Đerdap, and elevated water level hundreds of kilometers upstream, including Danube's tributaries, so the Sava flooded former bank in Umka suitable for docking and further augmented problem with landslides. The railroad was discontinued by the early 1970s. The administrative status changed (Umka used to be a seat of the district and of the municipality), typical local architectural physiognomy also began to changed, and the town began to stagnate.

Umka was well known in former Yugoslavia for its two major factories: Zelengora, the knitted goods manufacturer and general representative for the Speedo swimsuits, and Umka cardboard factory. Both factories followed the destiny of other companies during the economic collapse in the 1990s. Umka also has an advanced agricultural farm.

== Notable people ==
- Milan Gutović, actor
