= Stepojevac =

Stepojevac Степојевац
- Suburban settlement
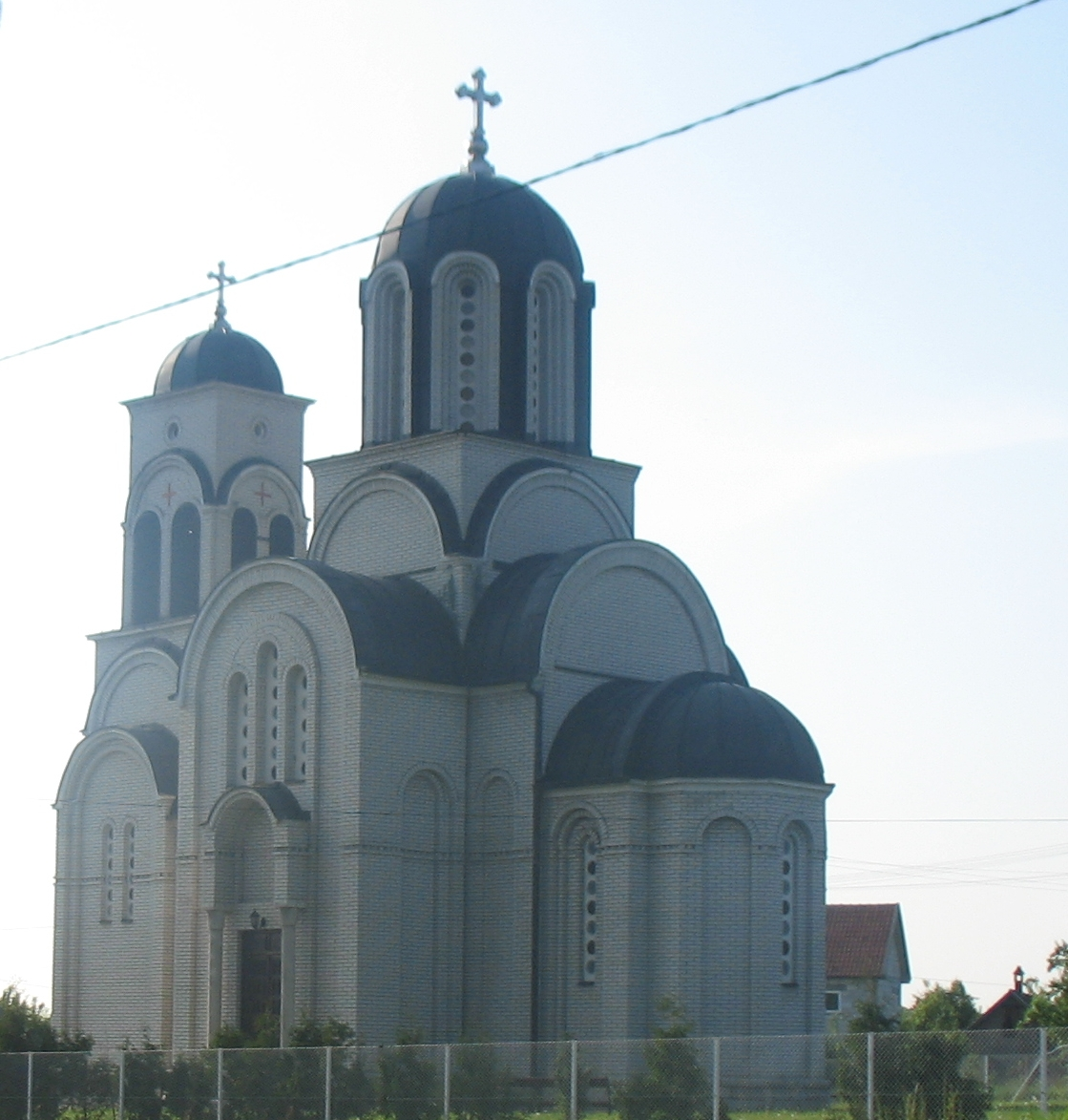
- Stepojevac Church

- Location within Serbia
- Coordinates: 44.5128°N 20.2950°E
- Country: Serbia
- Region: Belgrade
- Municipality: Lazarevac

Area
  - Total: 20.82 km^{2} (8.04 sq mi)
- Elevation: 119 m (390 ft)

Population (2011)
  - Total: 2,894
  - Density: 139.0/km^{2} (360.0/sq mi)
- Time zone: UTC+1 (CET)
  - Summer (DST): UTC+2 (CEST)
- Area code: +381(0)11
- Car plates: BG

Stepojevac (Serbian Cyrillic: Степојевац) is a suburban settlement of the municipality of Lazarevac, Belgrade, Serbia.
