= Meljak =

Meljak Мељак
- Suburban settlement
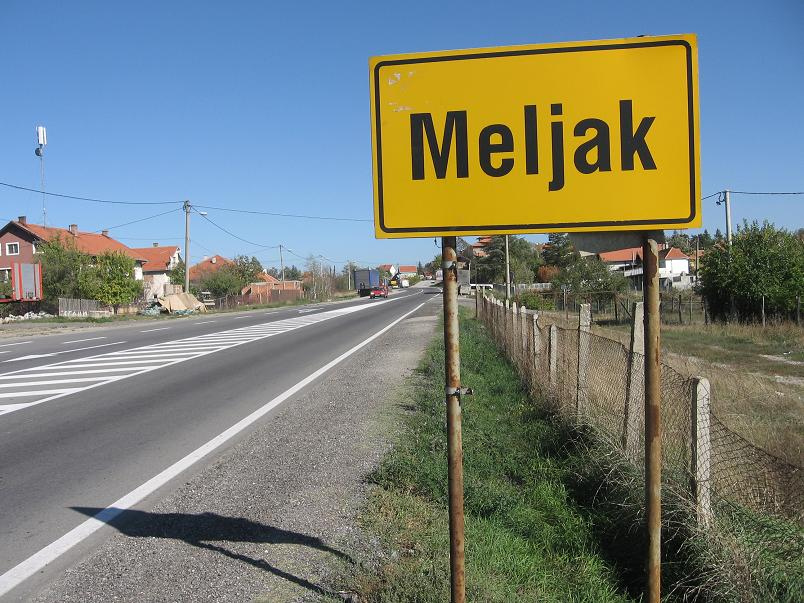
- Entrance sign to Meljak

- Location within Serbia
- Coordinates: 44°37′05″N 20°21′47″E
- Country: Serbia
- Region: Belgrade
- Municipality: Barajevo

Area
  - Total: 6.61 km^{2} (2.55 sq mi)

Population (2011)
  - Total: 2.208
  - Density: 0.334/km^{2} (0.865/sq mi)
- Time zone: UTC+1 (CET)
  - Summer (DST): UTC+2 (CEST)

Meljak (Serbian Cyrillic: Мељак) is a suburban settlement of Belgrade, Serbia. It is located in the municipality of Barajevo.

It is located northeast of the municipal seat of Barajevo. It is a rural settlement and thanks to its location on the Ibarska magistrala (Highway of Ibar), one of the fastest growing in the municipality. It grew from a population of 1,307 (Census 1991) to 1,772 (Census 2002), with an average annual growth of 2.8%.

Meljak was part of the municipality of Umka which was abolished in 1960 and divided between the municipalities of Čukarica and Barajevo (Meljak and Vranić).

== Demographics ==
year	population
1981	1,065
1991	1,307
2002	1,772
2011	2,208

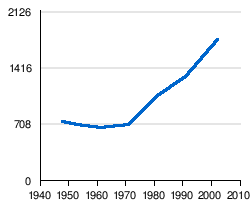
Meljak's population

== See also ==
2003 Meljak shooting
