= Barajevo =

Barajevo Барајево (Serbian)
- Municipality
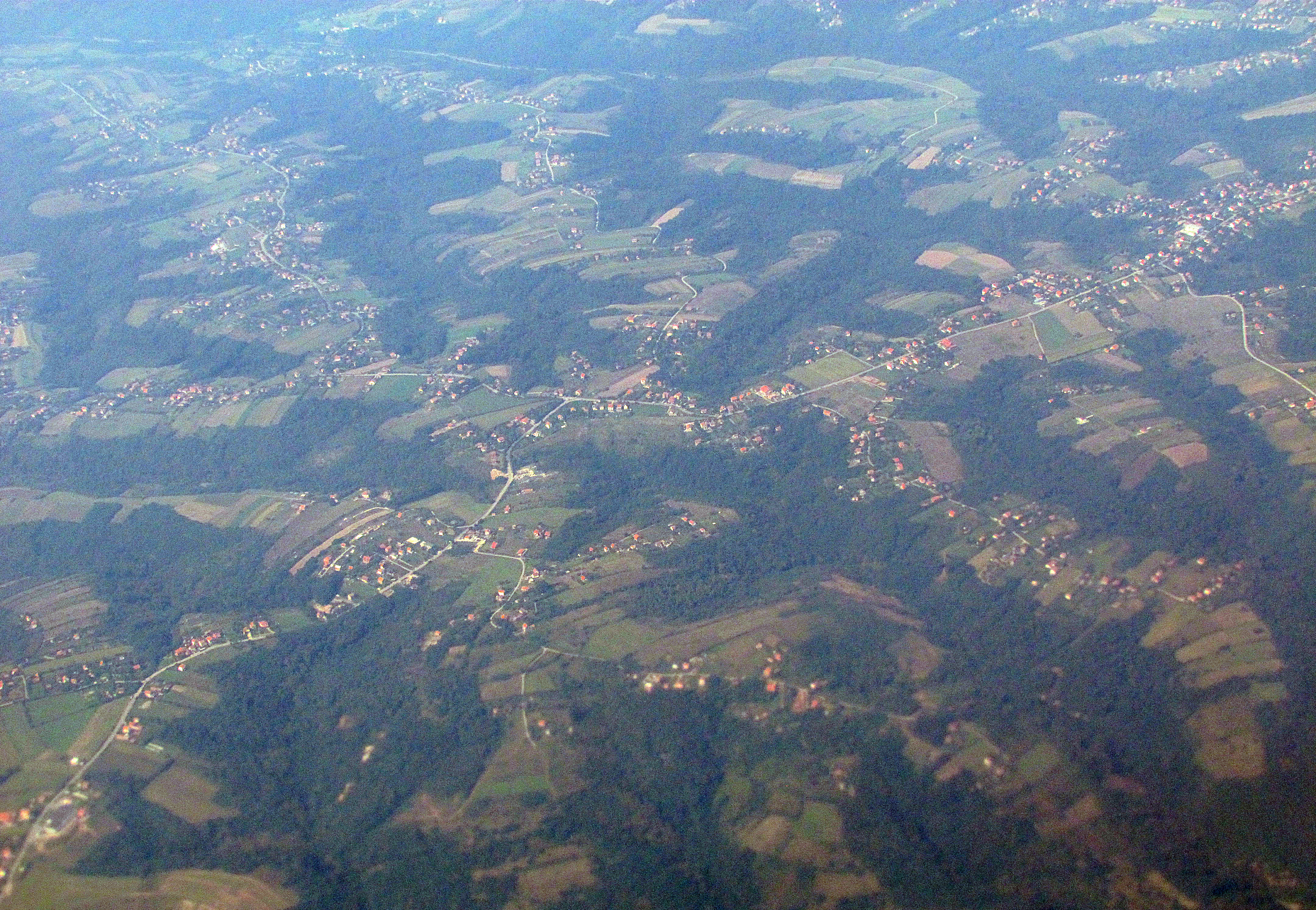
- Barajevo from air

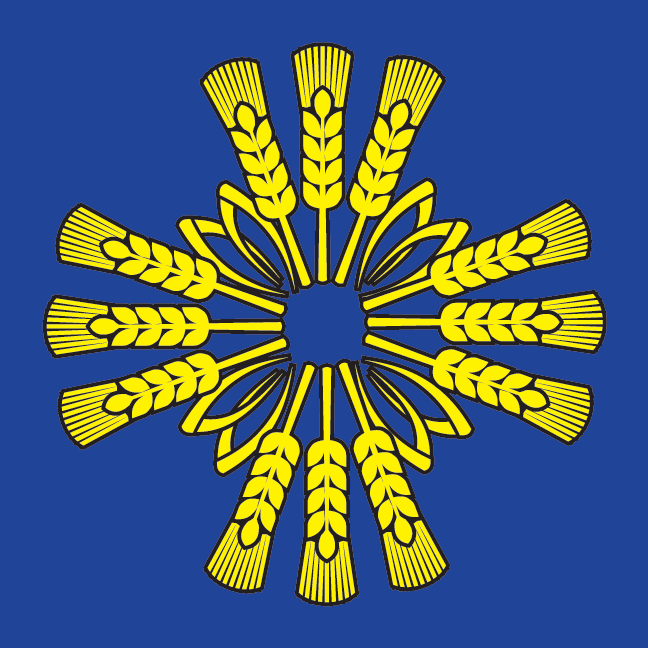
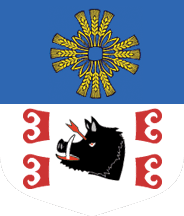
- Flag Coat of arms

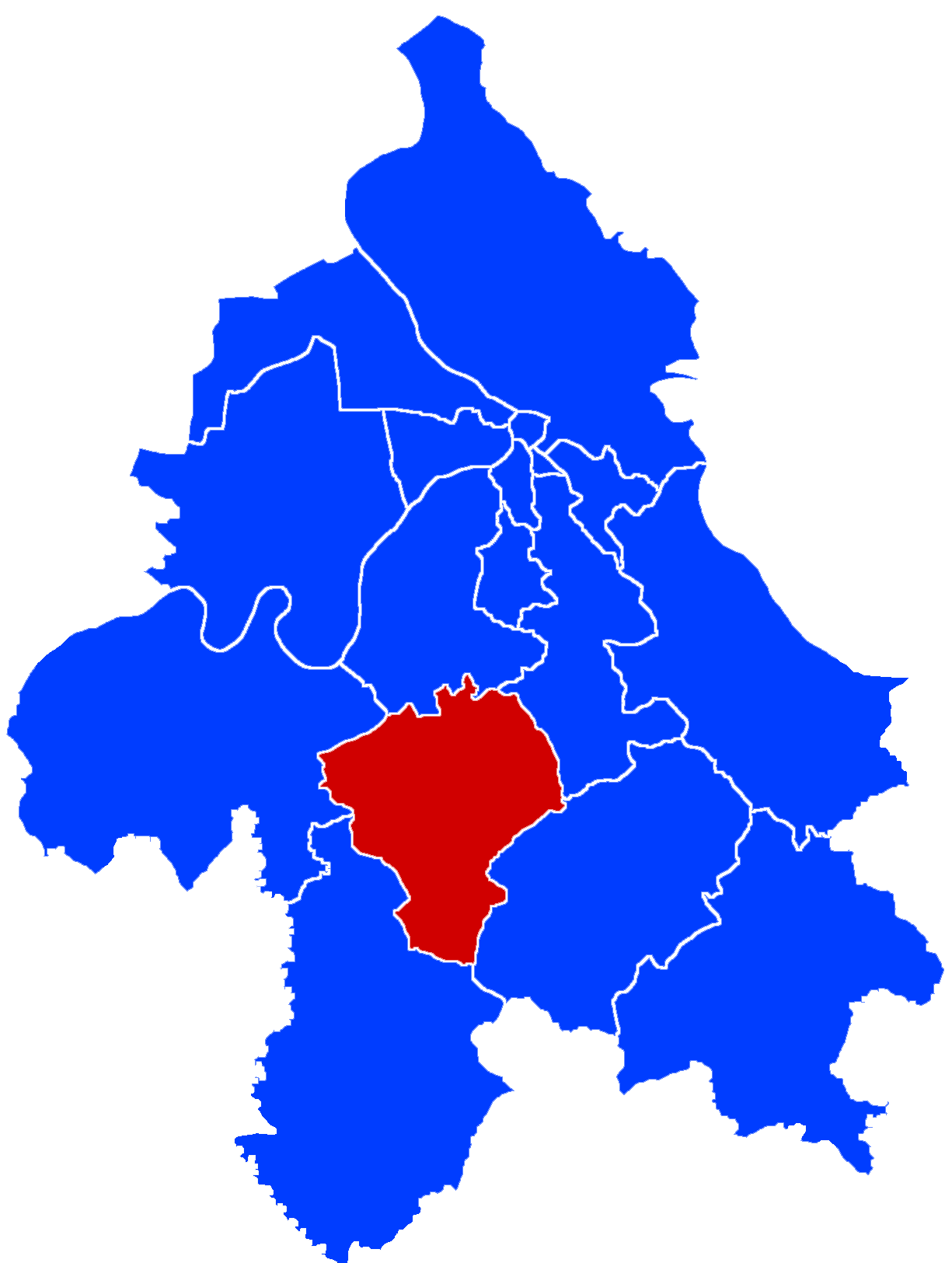
- Location of Barajevo within the city of Belgrade
- Coordinates: 44°35′N 20°25′E
- Country: Serbia
- City: Belgrade
- Settlements: 13

Government
  - Mayor: Bratoljub Stanisavljević (SNS)

Area
  - Village: 57.93 km^{2} (22.37 sq mi)
  - Municipality: 212.96 km^{2} (82.22 sq mi)

Population (2022 census)
  - Municipality: 26,431
- Time zone: UTC+1 (CET)
  - Summer (DST): UTC+2 (CEST)
- Postal code: 11460
- Area code: +381(0)11
- Car plates: BG
- Website: www.barajevo.org.rs

Barajevo (Serbian Cyrillic: Барајево, pronounced [bǎrajɛv̞ɔ]) is a municipality of the city of Belgrade. According to the 2022 census results, the municipality has a population of 26,431 inhabitants.

The municipality is located in the lower northern part of Šumadija, southeast of the Belgrade, with an elevation spanning from 140 meters to 364 meters. Most of the municipal territory belongs to the drainage area of the Turija river, right tributary of the Peštan river, which in turn flows into the Kolubara, thus whole area geographically gravitates to the Kolubara region. The cultural festival, "Barlet" (Barajevo summer) is held annually in Barajevo.

== History ==
Barajevo got the status of municipality in 1956 and immediately became administratively part of the wider Belgrade area. In 1957, a nearby municipality of Beljina was annexed to Barajevo, and in 1960 Umka municipality has been divided between Čukarica and Barajevo (villages of Meljak and Vranić).

The settlement of Barajevo is still statistically classified as a rural settlement. Its population is growing by even higher rate than the municipality as a whole. It is located east of the 'Parcanski vis' hill, northern part of the Kosmaj mountain, in the valley of the Beljanica river (or Barajevska reka; Cyrillic: Бељаница or Барајевска река), a tributary to the Turija river.

Many outer settlements and hamlets are built as Barajevo grows and stretches in all directions making one continuous built-up are with the neighboring settlements (Guncati, Baćevac, Lisović, Boždarevac, Guberevac in Sopot municipality): Bela Reka, Dražanovac, Dubrave, Gaj (a separate local community with a population of 1,930 in 2002), Glumčevo Brdo (a separate local community, split after the 2002 census), Karaula, Nenadovac, Pajšuma, Ravni Gaj, Srednji Kraj, Stara Lipovica, Suva Šuma, Trebež (the industrial zone), Vitkovica.

=== 2025 fire ===
On January 20 2025, a fire occurred in a nursing home killing 8 people.

== Settlements ==
The municipality of Barajevo covers an area of 213 km^{2} and includes 13 settlements, all of which are statistically classified as rural and not urban, including the settlement of Barajevo:

- Arnajevo
- Baćevac
- Beljina
- Boždarevac
- Guncati
- Lisović
- Manić
- Meljak
- Rožanci
- Šiljakovac
- Veliki Borak
- Vranić

It also includes various sub-settlements and hamlets spawning around the central settlements:

- Dražanovac
- Dubrave
- Gaj
- Glumčevo Brdo
- Karaula
- Nenadovac
- Pajšuma
- Rašića Kraj
- Ravni Gaj
- Srednji Kraj
- Stara Lipovica
- Suva Šuma
- Taraiš
- Trebež
- Vitkovica

== Demographics ==
Historical population
Year	Pop.	±% p.a.
1948	17,421	—
1953	18,148	+0.82%
1961	17,461	−0.48%
1971	16,552	−0.53%
1981	18,815	+1.29%
1991	21,647	+1.41%
2002	24,641	+1.18%
2011	27,110	+1.07%
2022	26,431	−0.23%

According to the 2022 census results, the municipality of Barajevo has a population of 26,431 inhabitants.

=== Ethnic groups ===
The ethnic composition of the municipality:

Ethnic group	Population	Percent
Serbs	24,134	91.3%
Romani	385	1.46%
Montenegrins	59	0.22%
Macedonians	61	0.23%
Muslims	43	0.16%
Yugoslavs	42	0.16%
Croats	41	0.16%
Russians	33	0.12%
Gorani	30	0.11%
Other	44	0.17%
Undeclared/Unknown	1,435	5.43%
Total	26,431	

== Economy ==
The economy of the municipality is not much developed. Being an agricultural area, Barajevo has a mill, large orchard farm, a veterinarian station and the hunting & forestry company of Lipovička šuma. Wheat, barley, oats and corn are being grown. Industry is based on the small construction and electronic companies and the ball bearing factory.

Two major traffic routes, the Ibar Highway and the railway Belgrade-Bar (Montenegro), are passing through the municipal territory. The settlement itself was further away, but as it grew, it reached the railway.

There are two game hunting grounds in the municipality: "Lipovička Šuma", which extends into the municipality of Čukarica, and "Barajevska Reka".

One of only three officially designated campsites in Belgrade by 2018 is located in the municipality, in the village of Baćevac. It is situated within the complex of the ethno-household "Zornić's House".

The following table gives a preview of total number of registered people employed in legal entities per their core activity (as of 2022):

Activity	Total
Agriculture, forestry and fishing	66
Mining and quarrying	2
Manufacturing	1,314
Electricity, gas, steam and air conditioning supply	49
Water supply; sewerage, waste management and remediation activities	139
Construction	363
Wholesale and retail trade, repair of motor vehicles and motorcycles	860
Transportation and storage	292
Accommodation and food services	195
Information and communication	68
Financial and insurance activities	24
Real estate activities	12
Professional, scientific and technical activities	166
Administrative and support service activities	57
Public administration and defense; compulsory social security	332
Education	320
Human health and social work activities	362
Arts, entertainment and recreation	46
Other service activities	96
Individual agricultural workers	37
Total	4,799

== Duboki Potok lake ==
The artificial lake "Duboki Potok" (Дубоки поток; Deep brook) is located near Barajevo, with the large weekend-settlement, and is colloquially called the "Barajevo Sea". The lake is some 30 km (19 mi) south of downtown Belgrade and 2 km (1.2 mi) northeast from downtown Barajevo. It was created in the early 1990s when the brook of the same name was dammed, so as one of his tributaries. The lake is 800 m (2,600 ft) long, 100 m (330 ft) wide, has an area of 7.2 ha (18 acres) and an average depth of 6 m (20 ft). One side of the lake is surrounded by the thick forest and other by the meadows. On the forested side, the lake is deepest, up to 7.5 m (25 ft). There are several water wells around the lake, remnants from the period when the dam was constructed.

Even though the water is health safe, it warms up to 28 °C (82 °F) during summer, and there is a 100 m (330 ft) long pebble beach on the left shore, bathing in the lake is officially banned, though visitors do swim regularly. Shores are not urbanized, but there are kafana, splav and a kayaking club on the shore. The club has rich collection of artistic paintings and sculptures donated by the artists from Serbia. One of the exhibits is the kayak which was used by Matija Ljubek and Mirko Nišović when they won a gold medal at the 1984 Summer Olympics in Los Angeles. Sports fishing is developed as the lake is populated with a variety of fish: common bream, common roach, Prussian carp, common rudd, common carp, zander, northern pike, wels catfish and grass carp. The water is apparently very clean, as the lake is also inhabited by crayfish and freshwater bivalves. There is an underwater spring in the lake.

As the splav was located at the starting point of the dam's spillway, there was a danger it might block it, so it was removed from the water in the late 2010s. Municipality made planes to arrange several sports fields around the lake, including volleyball and five-a-side football.

== Trivia ==
First mention of the name Barajevo is from the 16th century. The popular story that the settlement got its name from the multitude of springs in this area [Serbian: bara je ovo (this is a pond)] is probably not true.

Also, the reality TV show The Farm is captured in the village of Lisović.

== See also ==
- Subdivisions of Belgrade
- List of Belgrade neighborhoods and suburbs

== Sources ==
- Mala Prosvetina Enciklopedija, Third edition (1985); Prosveta; ISBN 86-07-00001-2
- Jovan Đ. Marković (1990): Enciklopedijski geografski leksikon Jugoslavije; Svjetlost-Sarajevo; ISBN 86-01-02651-6
- Srpska porodična enciklopedija, Vol. II (2006); Narodna knjiga and Politika NM; ISBN 86-331-2731-8
