= Rucka =

Town in Belgrade district, Serbia

Rucka Руцка
- Town
- Location within Serbia
- Coordinates: 44°39′22″N 20°18′23″E
- Country: Serbia
- District: Belgrade
- Municipality: Čukarica

Area
  - Total: 2.97 km^{2} (1.15 sq mi)

Population (2011)
  - Total: 316
  - Density: 106/km^{2} (276/sq mi)
- Time zone: UTC+1 (CET)
  - Summer (DST): UTC+2 (CEST)

Rucka (Serbian Cyrillic: Руцка) is a suburban settlement of Belgrade, the capital of Serbia. It is located in the municipality of Čukarica.

Rucka is the westernmost and the least populated settlement in the municipality of Čukarica. It is located just 1.5 km west of Umka, with which it makes a continuous built-up urban area, so in the future much smaller Rucka (population of 316, census 2011) might be annexed to Umka (population of 5,292, Census 2002).

Rucka is one of the smallest settlements in the City of Belgrade area, and being classified as an urban, one of the smallest towns in Serbia.
