= Stepin Lug =

Park in Belgrade, Serbia

Coordinates: 44°44′43″N 20°32′10″E

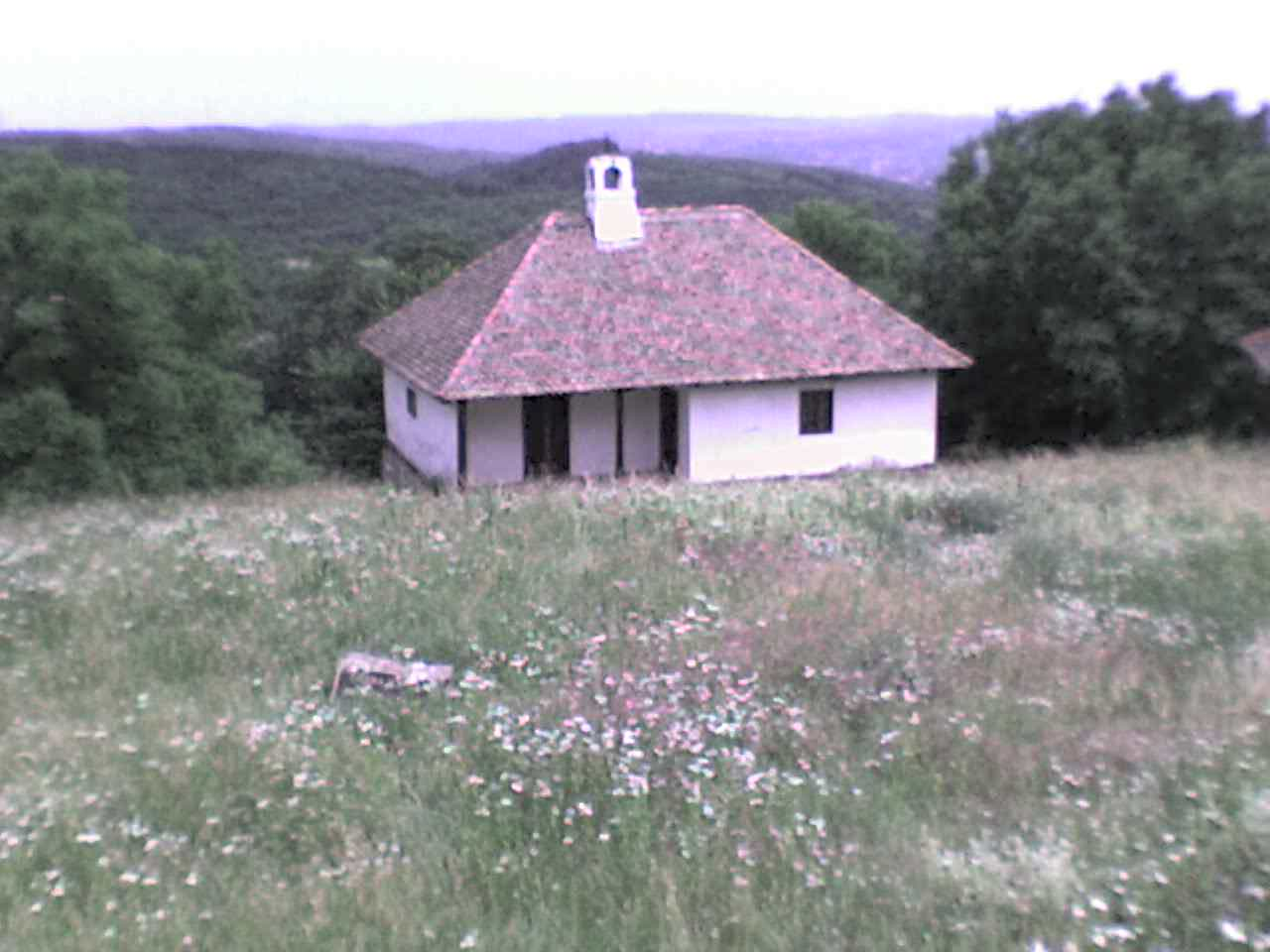
Birth house of vojvoda Stepa Stepanović in Kumodraž with Stepin Lug seen in the distance

Stepin Lug (Serbian: Степин Луг) or Gaj (Serbian: Гај) is a park-forest and, for the most part, non-residential suburban settlement of Belgrade, the capital of Serbia. It is located in Belgrade's municipalities of Voždovac (southern part) and Zvezdara (northern part). It is part of the forest complex Stepin Lug-Baba Velka-Torlak-Jajinci, which is the largest wooden area in Belgrade.

== Location ==
Stepin Lug is located on the south-eastern outskirts of Belgrade, 13 km (8.1 miles) from downtown. It is a large, wooded area, roughly bordered by the neighborhoods of Veliki Mokri Lug on the north, Kumodraž on the north-west, Jajinci and Selo Rakovica on the west, Beli Potok on the south and Bubanj Potok on the east. The southern border is marked by the road of Kružni put and eastern by the Belgrade-Niš highway.

== Geography ==
Stepin Lug or formerly known as Titov Gaj or just Gaj, is a memorial complex, a park-wood with an area of 8.5 km^{2} (3.3 sq mi), out of which 4.78 km^{2} (1.85 sq mi) has been protected and maintained. Total forested area was 4.91 km^{2} (1.90 sq mi) in 2010. Of that, 3.76 km^{2} (1.45 sq mi) was in Voždovac, and 1.15 km^{2} (0.44 sq mi) in Zvezdara.

Stepin Lug can be divided into several areas:

- Stepin Lug ("Stepa's Grove"), in the northern section of the wood. Bounded by the small stream of the Zavojnička reka, it is located in the municipality of Zvezdara. It occupies the small hill of Stražarska kosa and two smaller sub-areas of Baba Velka and Dugo bilo.
- Gaj or formerly Titov Gaj (Tito's Grove), in the central section. It occupies the area of the hill of Golo brdo, between the creeks of Bubanj Potok and Kamena voda.
- Lipovica (Lime tree wood), in the northern section, the least forested area of Stepin Lug, along the Kružni put. It should not bee confused with the much more popular recreational area of Lipovica (Lipovička šuma) in the municipality of Barajevo.

== Plantlife ==
The area has a 13 distinct tree communities, but the number of the separate species is three times larger as many species were planted later even though they are not autochthonous, including both conifers and deciduous trees. They include:

Evergreen trees:

- Cedar (Atlas cedar, white cedar, California Incense Cedar);
- Cypress (Lawson's cypress);
- Douglas fir;
- Fir (white fir, Greek fir, Nordmann fir, Spanish Fir);
- Juniper (Greek juniper);
- Larch (European Larch);
- Pine (European black pine, blue pine, Weymouth pine);

Deciduous trees:

- Ash tree (European ash)
- Birch;
- Black locust;
- Chestnut (common horse-chestnut, sweet chestnut);
- Common Hackberry;
- European hornbeam;
- Honey locust;
- London plane;
- Maple (Norway maple, Sycamore maple);
- Mulberry trees;
- Oak trees (English oak, northern red oak, durmast oak);
- Pagoda tree;
- Poplar (white poplar, black poplar)
- Rowan;
- Silver lime;
- Southern catalpa;
- Turkish Hazel;
- Walnut (black walnut, Persian walnut);
- Willow (White Willow, golden willow);

In March 2015, an area of 2 ha (4.9 acres) had been reforested with the white ash and red oak, one hectare and 2,000 seedlings each.

== Wildlife ==
The wildlife comprises hares, roes, pheasants. and wild hogs.

== Characteristics ==
Important historical features are the vicinity of the Torlak hill and its importance in the battles for Belgrade in the World War I and the memorial-house of vojvoda Stepa Stepanović, one of the main army-leaders of the Serbian army. On 23 May 1972 the wooded complex Torlak-Baba Velka('s forest) was declared a park under the name "Titov Gaj", celebrating Yugoslav Communist president Josip Broz Tito's 80th birthday.

Stepin Lug has a 5 km (3.1 miles) hiking and jogging path. While it was called Titov Gaj, a mountain hut was built especially for him. He never visited the hut and it burned in the fire in the early 2010s. Also in the early 2010s, Stepin Lug was mentioned as a possible location of the Belgrade Zoo, if the old one is to be moved out of the Kalemegdan, though the forest was envisioned as the possible location of the relocated zoo already in 1965.

Despite the bad traffic connection with downtown, in 2020–2021, during the COVID-19 pandemic, number of visitors from Belgrade grew as the city parks and green areas were closed or the access was restricted. In April 2022, the arranging of the area began with thorough cleaning. By June 2022, the construction of the sports fields and quad trail are planned.

== Sources ==
- B.Jovanović, E.Vukićević: Titov Gaj, 1977;
