= Rakovički potok =

- Native name: Раковички поток (Serbian)

Location
- Country: Serbia

Physical characteristics
- Source
  - location: Torlak Hill, Kumodraž-Belgrade
- Mouth
  - location: Topčiderka, at Kneževac-Belgrade
  - coordinates: 44°44′17″N 20°26′06″E
- Length: approx. 8.5 km (5.3 mi)

Basin features
- Progression: Topčiderka→ Sava→ Danube→ Black Sea

The Rakovički potok (Serbian: Раковички поток, Rakovički potok, lit. 'Rakovica Creek') is a short stream in north-central Serbia, an 8,5 kilometer-long right tributary to the Topčiderka river. During its entire flow it runs through the southern outskirts of the urban section of Belgrade. It is one of the 40 rivers, streams and creeks that flow or used to flow through Belgrade, but as the majority of them is completely or partially conducted underground into the city sewage system, Rakovički potok avoided such faith. Even though it is short, the creek flows through a number of Belgrade's neighborhoods and gave its name to two urban neighborhoods of Belgrade, one municipality and a monastery.

== Course ==
The creek originates from the northern slopes of the Torlak hill, in the south-eastern part of the Belgrade's urban neighborhood of Kumodraž in the Voždovac municipality. It flows to the south, along the eastern side of the Torlak, passing between the neighborhoods of Jajinci and Selo Rakovica. In the Pašinac field it receives the Milošev potok from the left, turns north-west and enters the municipality of Rakovica. It flows next to the northern section of the neighborhood of Resnik, several smaller, new neighborhoods (Jelezovac, Sunčani Breg, Straževica) and the monastery of Rakovica, curving along the eastern and northern slopes of the 209 meter-high hill of Straževica. At the neighborhood of Kneževac, Rakovički potok receives the creek of Zmajevac and for the last 300 meters has been conducted underground, below the industrial complex of the "21 Maj" factory, emptying into the Topčiderka.

== Characteristics ==
The creek got its name from the crayfish ("Crayfish creek"; Serbian: rak, rakovica) which used to live in the creek in the Middle Ages. In turn, the creek gave its name to the Belgrade's modern municipality of Rakovica, the neighborhoods of Rakovica (in the same municipality) and Selo Rakovica (in the municipality of Voždovac) and the monastery of Rakovica.

The central valley of the creek is a natural route for the eastern part of the Kružni put, the main road connecting the southern outskirts of Belgrade and the projected route of the future Belgrade beltway. Belgrade-Požarevac railway also passes through the valley, parallel to the road. The area near the creek's mouth (Kneževac-Rakovica) is one of major industrial zones in Belgrade.

In May 1999, during the NATO bombing of Serbia, the electrical substation in Rakovica was hit and 80 tons of heating oil partially burned polluting the air, but a significant amount leaked into the Rakovički potok polluting Topčiderka and Sava rivers downstream.

== Bibliography ==
- Beograd — plan grada; M@gic M@p, 2006. ISBN 86-83501-53-1.
