= Banjica =

Banjica Бањица
- Urban neighbourhood
- Location within Belgrade
- Coordinates: 44°45′32″N 20°29′04″E
- Country: Serbia
- Region: Belgrade
- Municipality: Savski Venac / Voždovac

Area
  - Total: 3.36 km^{2} (1.30 sq mi)
- Time zone: UTC+1 (CET)
  - Summer (DST): UTC+2 (CEST)
- Area code: +381(0)11
- Car plates: BG

Banjica (Serbian: Бањица, pronounced [bâɲitsa]) is an urban neighborhood of Belgrade, the capital of Serbia. It's divided between Belgrade's municipalities of Savski Venac (western half) and Voždovac (eastern half).

== Location ==
Banjica is located 5–6 kilometers south of the center of Belgrade (Terazije), on the Banjica hill. On the southwest, the hill descends into the valley and neighborhood of Lisičji Potok and further continues into the hill and woods of Topčider while on the southwest and south it descends into the valley of the creek of Kaljavi potok, bordering the neighborhoods of Kanarevo Brdo (south-west) and Jajinci (south). To the west, Banjica extends into the elite neighborhood of Dedinje while the eastern side is covered by the Banjica forest, a long narrow belt of deciduous woodland along the Boulevard of Liberation, which used to separate Banjica from the neighborhoods of Voždovac and Trošarina. Nowadays those neighborhoods are connected to Banjica.

== Geography ==
There are two forests in the neighborhood. Banjica hill (Banjički vis, Savski Venac, 1.96 hectares (4.8 acres)), and Banjica Forest (Banjička šuma, Voždovac, 39.61 hectares (97.9 acres)). There is a small park next to the Banjica Sports Complex, covering 0.36 hectares (0.89 acres)).

In 2011 a project of the revitalization of the Kaljavi potok was announced. The stream is already channeled and has a concrete bed, but it also receives waters from many local cesspits. It was envisioned as the green oasis between the trolleybus terminus in Banjica and the "Tehnogas" factory in Kanarevo Brdo, just 5 km (3.1 mi) from downtown Belgrade. The 800-metre-long (2,625 ft) section of the stream was projected as the history and nature reserve as it was to include the remnants of the Paleolithic site, pedestrian and bicycle paths, trim trail, a series of small bridges over the stream, three natural springs, limestone above-the-ground formations and the habitat of 20 species of rare birds, not usually find in the urbanized areas. The entire revitalized area was projected at 8 ha (20 acres) and should comprise the surrounding forest, rearranged forest paths, outdoor gym, children playgrounds and gazebos. The illegally built houses, fences, gardens and sewage drains along the stream were to be demolished. It was supposed to be the starting phase of the creation of the "green-blue corridors", the network of arranged forest and water sections all over the city, and the next project was already slated to be the stream of Jelezovac potok, a tributary to the Kaljavi potok. As of 2017, nothing from the entire project has been done.

== History ==
=== Prehistory ===
Vinča culture figurines and terracotta covered with inscriptions and meander art place civilized human activity in Banjica to 7,000 years ago. The Usek locality has been surveyed in 1955-1957, 1978 and 1998. With continuous habitation from 5200 to 4600 BCE, it is one of the longest existing Vinčan settlement that has been discovered so far. It has well preserved houses, giving insight into the architecture and urbanism of the day. The largest Vinčan house discovered so far, covering 200 square metres (2,200 sq ft), was excavated here. The settlement had megarons, specialized economic structures, but also numerous smaller structures, like pantries, and silos. In 1964, the locality was protected as the cultural monument.

The locality was endangered in the 1990s by the construction in the neighborhood, but was preserved. Illegal construction in 2004 which threatened it, was stopped. In July 2022, an "unknown investor" without any permits, destroyed 84 square metres (900 sq ft) of the locality with construction machines, as part of the surrounding protective green belt. After citizens reports, the inspection closed the area, but the investor removed the protection and continued with works. Before he was stopped, he removed almost 200 cubic metres (7,100 cu ft) of archaeological layers, or some 15 years of research. Ceramics, animal bones, bone, stone and horn tools, remains of the houses, furnaces and fireplaces ended up scattered over the locality. The damage was done by the construction of the supporting wall, 12 metres (39 ft) long and 2.6 metres (8 ft 6 in) tall, made of reinforced concrete, and the archaeologists consider it irreparable.

=== Modern history ===
The name of the neighborhood comes from the Serbian word banja, meaning spa, thus it can be translated as the "small spa".

Banjica used to be a suburban village, inhabited in the early 19th century by migrants from southeastern Serbia who came after the end of the Second Serbian Uprising in 1815. In 1903 Banjica was the location of the military parade made for coronation of king Petar I Karađorđević of Serbia.

At the beginning of the 20th century, location of the Belgrade Hippodrome was moved from the neighborhood of Marinkova Bara to Banjica. There, the First Serbian derby was held.

Near the location of modern VMA, in the beginning of 1912, first wooden airplane hangar was built. Two years later, when the World War I broke, Banjica was the base where an airplane squadron and the balloon company of the Serbian Air Force were stationed.

Until World War II Banjica remained a quiet village with most of its population employed in crop production to support the growing agricultural demands of Belgrade. During the World War II Banjica was also a place where the German forces together with their Serbian collaborators ran a Banjica concentration camp.

From June 1945 to December 1946, Banjica was one of 5 administrative neighborhoods within Belgrade’s Raion VI. After the war, the village was heavily urbanized, with new large apartment buildings built in place of old family houses. Banjica had a population of 17,711 in 2002.

== Characteristics ==
Today, Banjica is mainly a residential area, but with large diversity in administrative and sports buildings. The most notable ones are:

- VMA (Vojno-medicinska akademija), a famous military hospital. A massive, modern building constructed in 1980 on top of the Banjica hill, thus visible from many lower parts of the city. It is the largest single hospital in Serbia.

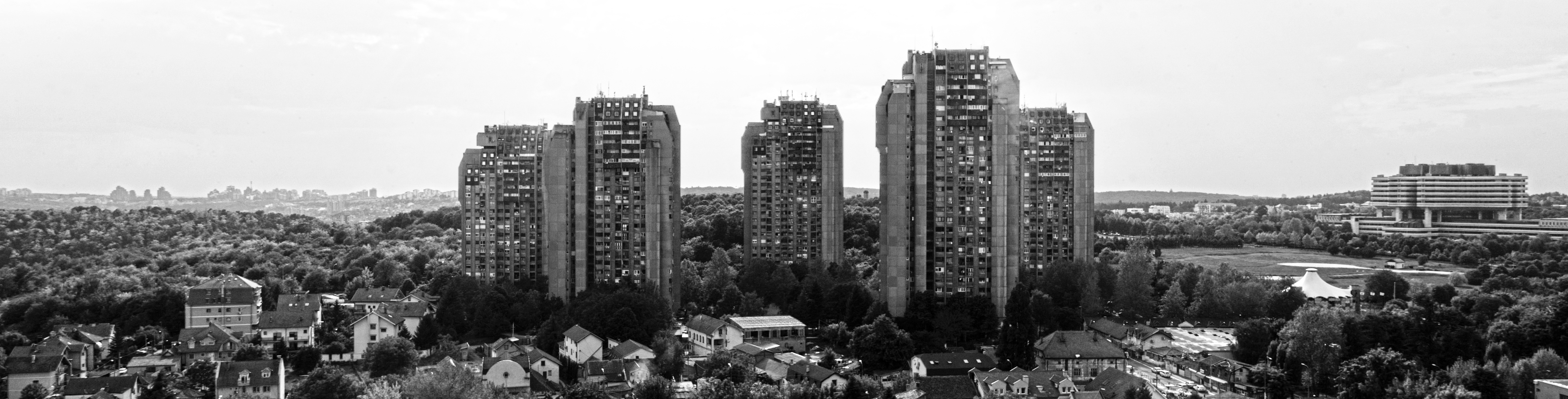
CRW 2636 Panorama

- Orthopedic hospital, just north-west of the VMA.
- Police academy.
- Banjica sports centre, which includes the open pools, one of the most popular in Belgrade during summer.
- FK Rad stadium, right next to the sports centre.
- Church of the Saint Vasilije Ostroški.
- Museum of the Banjica concentration camp, on the corner of the Crnotravska and Generala Pavla Jurišića Šturma streets.
- Hotel Best Western (former "Mladost") in the Banjica forest.

Public transport includes bus, trolleybus and tram lines. Bus lines toward the city are 42, 47, 48, 50, 59, 78, 94, trolleybus lines are 40 and 41, tram lines are 9, 10 and 14. The public transport station near the school is also the place where people living in nearby villages switch from their local buses (400(seasonal), 401, 402, 403, 405, 406, 407 and 408) to the above-mentioned lines toward the city.

=== Athletics Hall ===
In 2011 an initiative was started for building the first athletics hall in Serbia which, apart from organizing competitions, was to serve for training of the national athletes. First location was on New Belgrade (at the end of the Blokovi neighborhood) and then on Košutnjak, within the scopes of the Institute for sports. Projects were drafted for both locations, funding was provided through the National Investment Plan (NIP), but since none of the projects took off, the funds were returned to NIP. In 2012, the Ministry of Defense donated the lot within the Military Academy's barracks of "General Jovan Mišković". The lot is located in the northern part of the Byford's Forest (formerly, Banjica Forest). In April 2012 it was announced that the hall will be finished by the end of 2013. The military would also use the hall, as a training facility for the cadets and students of the academy. The project of the "Centroprojekt" company was compliant to the standards of IAAF.

The project includes 4 round (200 m (660 ft)) and 8 sprint tracks (60 m (200 ft)), sections for the long jump, high jump, pole vault, triple jump and shot put. Under the stands, which have 1,000 seats, numerous premises were planned, including the anti-doping facility, ambulance, gym, etc. Administrative section of the building will become the seat of the Athletics Federation of Serbia. The total area of the venue is 7,200 m^{2} (78,000 sq ft). Defense minister Dragan Šutanovac announced that the hall will be named "General Đukić Hall", after Svetomir Đukić, the founder of modern Olympism in Serbia. Works began in June 2012. Instead of being finished by the end of 2013, the construction dragged on for almost four years and the facility was ceremonially open on 1 March 2016 with the inaugural issue of the international athletics meeting "Serbia Open". The venue hasn't been named after General Đukić and, as of September 2017, it still has no official name.

== Banjica II ==
There is a small (by western standards) shopping mall next to the school, and a well-stocked green market up the hill, where people bring fresh grocery goods from afar. The school's name is "Bora Stanković" and it is for grades 1–8 (ages 7–15). There is no high school in the neighborhood, but due to good public transport students can easily reach numerous high schools in Belgrade (most popular choices are Fourth and Twelfth College-Preparatory High Schools, which are the closest).

== Images of Banjica ==
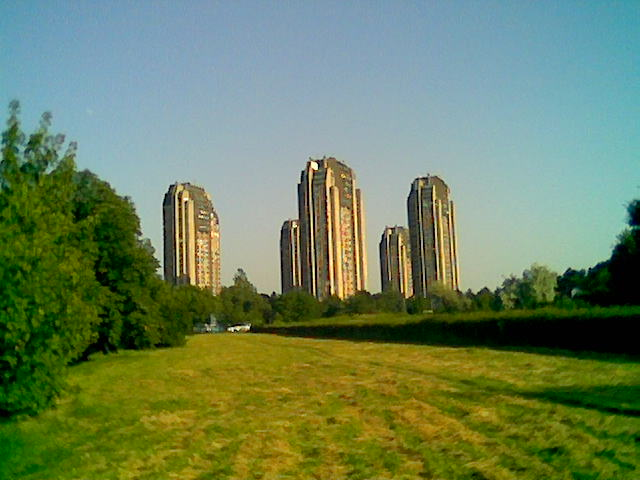

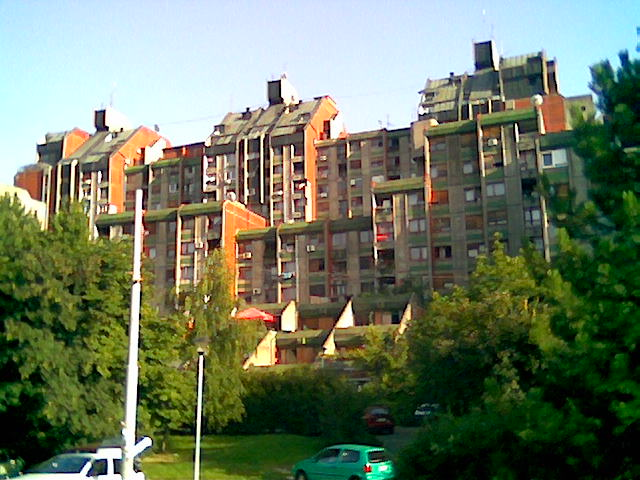

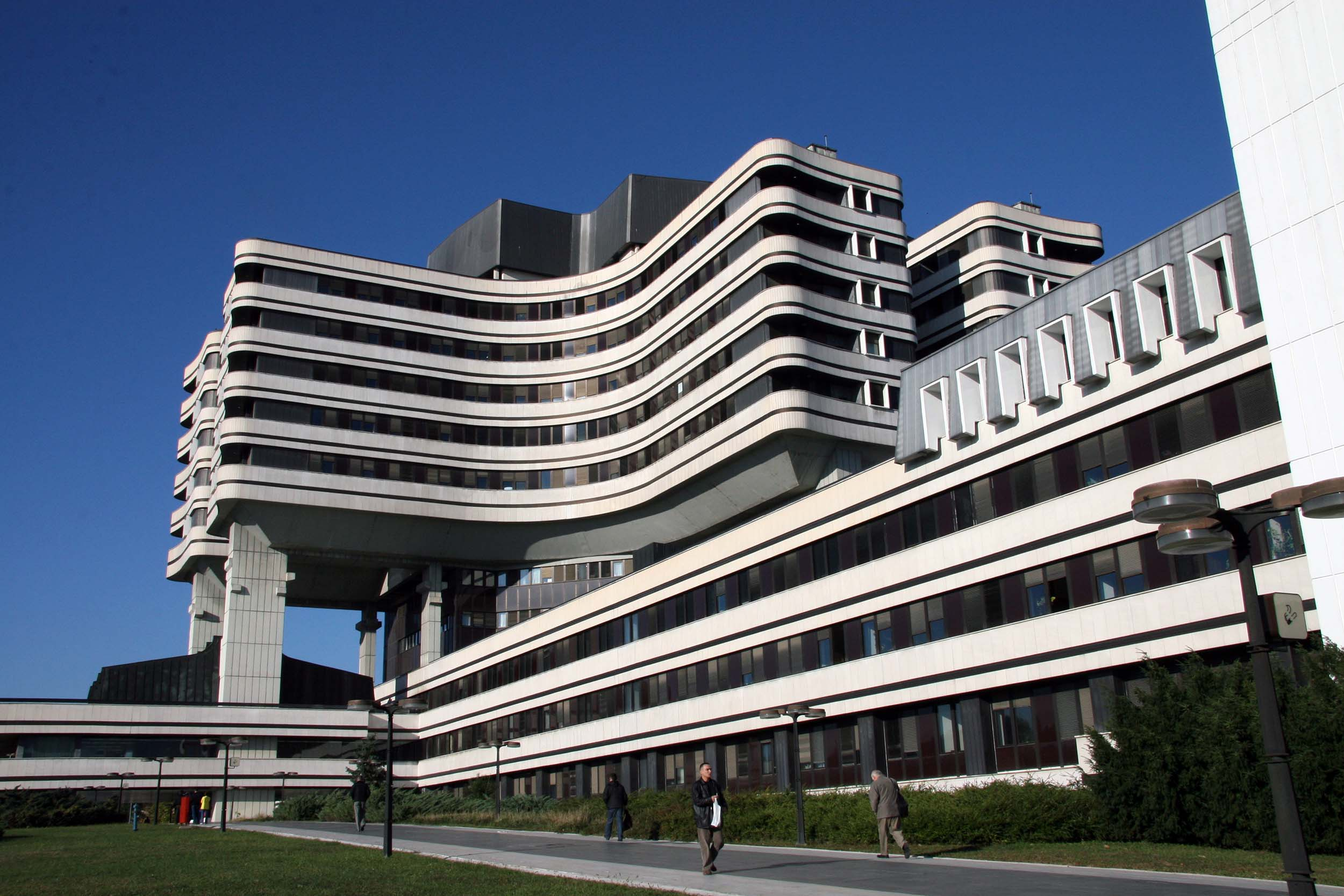
Military Medical Academy
