= Jelezovac =

Jelezovac Јелезовац
- Urban neighbourhood
- Location within Belgrade
- Coordinates: 44°44′00″N 20°28′08″E
- Country: Serbia
- Region: Belgrade
- Municipality: Rakovica
- Local community: Sunčani Breg

Area
  - Total: 0.44 sq mi (1.14 km^{2})
- Elevation: 607 ft (185 m)

Population (2002)
  - Total: 1,493
  - Density: 3,390/sq mi (1,310/km^{2})
- Time zone: UTC+1 (CET)
  - Summer (DST): UTC+2 (CEST)
- Postal code: 11231

Jelezovac (Serbian Cyrillic: Јелезовац) is an urban neighborhood of Belgrade, the capital of Serbia. It is located in the municipality of Rakovica. Though official city documents refer to the area as part of the Sunčani Breg-Jelezovac settlement, the neighborhood which developed in the western part of the Jelezovac area is known as Miljakovac III. Jelezovac remains as the name for the brook and its, still partially non-urbanized valley.

== Location ==
Jelezovac area occupies entire central-east part of the Rakovica municipality, adjoining the Voždovac municipality and its neighborhood of Jajinci (sub-neighborhoods Rasadnik and Mala Utrina). It is bordered by Kanarevo Brdo and southeast extension of Banjica II are on the north and Miljakovac II and Miljakovac Forest on the northwest. Central western section is urbanized as Miljakovac III while on the south it reaches the Kružni Put thoroughfare, and the neighborhoods of Resnik (to the west) and Selo Rakovica (to the east).

== Valley ==
The stream springs in the southern part of Jajinci and generally flows into the northwest direction, forming the boundary between the municipalities of Rakovica and Voždovaca for the most of its course. Water spring Kladenac is located in the lower section of the valley. The Lipica creek, flowing from the Mala Utrina area, is the right, and largest tributary. Both streams have torrential water levels. The Jelezovac itself flows into the Kaljavi Potok, at the Messer Tehnogas complex. Kaljavi Potok, in turn, continues to the west for 1.5 km (0.93 mi) and flows into the Topčiderka. This final section is completely regulated and conducted underground.

The valley is divided into the Upper Jelezovac (Gornji Jelezovac, altitude of 189 m (620 ft)) and Lower Jelezovac (Donji Jelezovac, 156 m (512 ft)). Upper section occupies the area around the source of the stream, close to the Rakovički Creek and Mali Zabran locality, while the lower encompasses the central section and the area around the creek's mouth.

== Characteristics ==
Unlike the Kaljavi Potok in which it flows, the Jelezovac creek is neither regulated nor conducted underground. As a torrential creek, the Jelezovac brings much eroded materials which the Kaljavi Potok's sewage collector can't receive. Sometimes this causes flooding in the neighborhood of Kanarevo Brdo, where the mouth of the Kaljavi Potok is. In its urbanized, central section, the Jelezovac area reaches the Zmajevac creek.

In 1965, city administration considered relocation of the city zoo from the Belgrade Fortress in downtown. One of the locations on the outskirts of the city, which was envisioned as the possible new location of the zoo by the city general plan, was Jelezovac. In the end, the zoo remained at its location.

In 2004, city began developing plans for developing Jelezovac-Sunčani Breg neighborhood, which was to stretch from Jelezovac on the east, to Resnik on the south-west. However, the illegal construction begin prior to that. Regulatory plan for the neighborhood was adopted in 2010, when three neighborhoods already formed in this area: Miljakovac III, Sunčani Breg and Zmajevac.

As urbanization began on the outskirts of the Jelezovac valley in the late 1960s, problems with the lack of sanitary sewage developed. They only grew in time and the valley became notorious for it. In 1991 a project for regulation of the creek was designed. It included construction of the reservoir (retention) and building of the proper sewage system for the urbanized sections along the valley.

From 2016 to 2020 the 3.5 km (2.2 mi) sewage collector "Jelezovac" was finally built. It extends from the Banjica collector and allows for some 10,000 individual septic tanks to connect to the main pipe, collecting waste from the surrounding neighborhoods of Jajinci and Miljakovac III.

== Population ==
According to the 2002 census, population of the planned Jelezovac-Sunčani Breg was 2,156, of which: 388 in Sunčani Breg, 1,493 in Miljakovac III (Jelezovac), 58 in buffer zone and 217 in Zmajevac. In its 2010 plan, city planned to settle over 16,500 people in the neighborhood. Local community of Sunčani Breg (sub-municipal administrative unit), which covers this area, was formed within Rakovica in 2010, being carved out from the local community of Resnik. By the 2011 census it had a population of 3,018.
