= Kumodraž =

Kumodraž Кумодраж
- Urban neighbourhood
- Location within Belgrade
- Coordinates: 44°44′N 20°31′E
- Country: Serbia
- Region: Belgrade
- Municipality: Voždovac
- Time zone: UTC+1 (CET)
  - Summer (DST): UTC+2 (CEST)
- Area code: +381(0)11
- Car plates: BG

Kumodraž (Serbian Cyrillic: Кумодраж, pronounced [kûmɔdraːʒ]) is an urban neighborhood of Belgrade, Serbia. It is located in Belgrade's municipality of Voždovac.

== Location ==
Kumodraž is located in the central-eastern part of the municipality, in the lower section of the Kumodraž field (Kumodraško polje), within the valley of Kumodraški potok creek. Eastern and southern borders of the neighborhood are marked by a series of hills: Torlak, Golo Brdo, Stražarska Kosa, and the Kumodraž area is a source of many other creeks apart from the one that gave its name to the neighborhood: Rakovički potok (flows through the neighborhoods of Selo Rakovica and Rakovica), Lipica (Jajinci), Zavojnička reka (a tributary to the Bolečica river), Bubanj potok (flows through Bubanj Potok, also a tributary to the Bolečica), Kamena voda, etc. To the north, Kumodraž is bordered by the neighborhood of Voždovac, to the north-west by Veliki Mokri Lug and to the east by Jajinci.

== Population ==
Population of Kumodraž by the official censuses of population:

- 1921 - 1,321
- 1971 - 8,547
- 2002 - 13,004 (Kumodraž, 5,405; Kumodraž I, 3,631; Kumodraž II 3,968)
- 2011 - 13,343 (Kumodraž, 6,064; Kumodraž I, 3,852; Kumodraž II 3,427)

== Characteristics ==
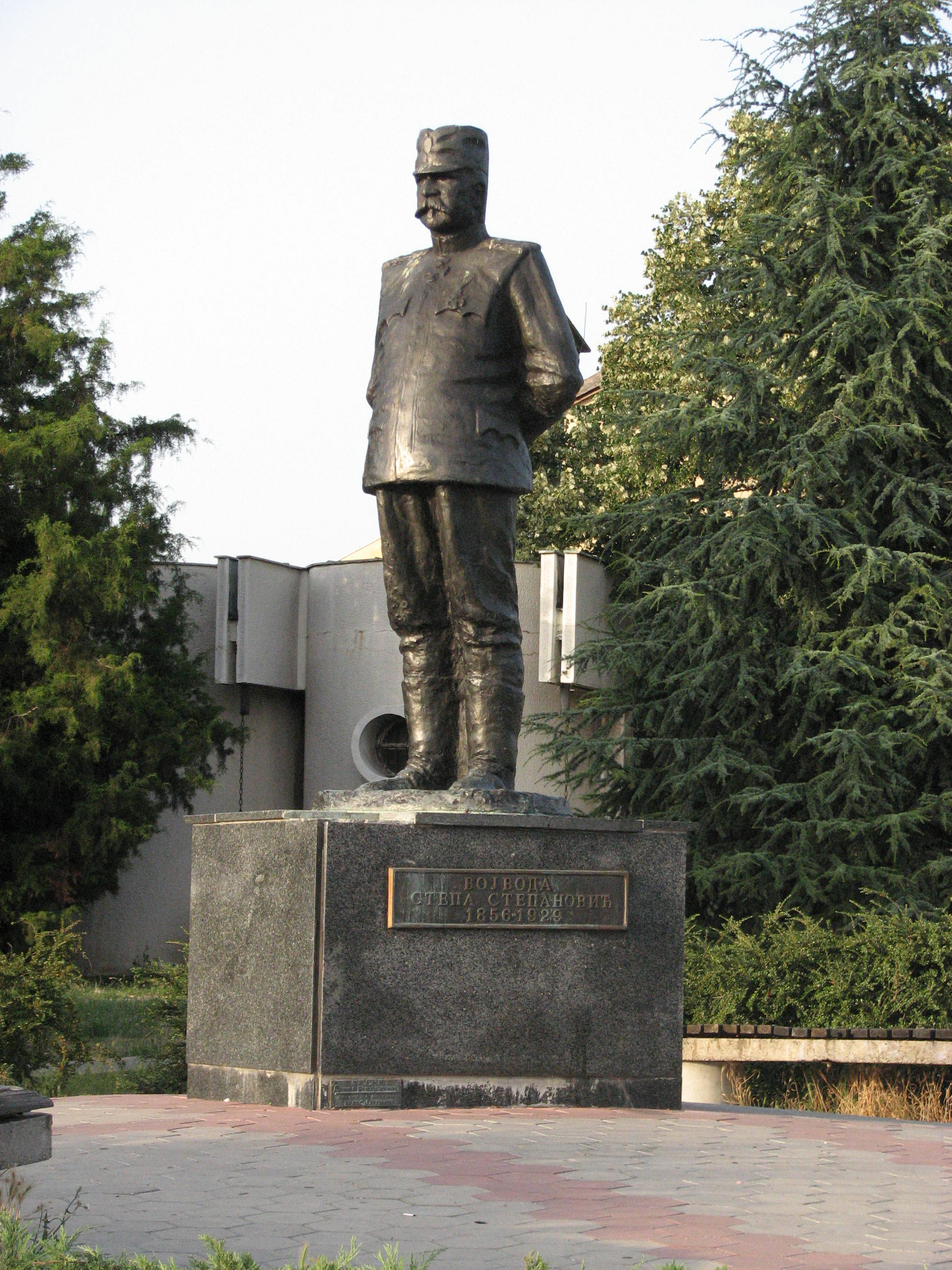
Stepa Stepanović monument in Kumodraž, Belgrade

A Roman aqueduct was used to convey water from the Kumodraž Hill. At some point, it joined the aqueduct from Mokri Lug Hill, and then continued further to the Singidunum castrum. Both Mokri Lug and Kumodraž are hills, so the natural inclination allowed for the water to flow downhill to Singidunum.

During the pre-World War I period, Kumodraž had its municipality, which stretched north to the eastern outskirts of Belgrade, comprising outer city suburbs, today neighborhoods, like Dušanovac.

Kumodraž used to be a small, agricultural village far from downtown Belgrade, but after the 1960s, the population boosted as was the case in almost all of Belgrade's suburbs at the time. In the 1970s, Kumodraž was administratively declared a local community ("mesna zajednica") within the municipality of Voždovac (part of the Belgrade City proper, uža teritorija grada), rather than being a separate settlement. Today, Kumodraž forms a continuous built-up area, even though it is about 10 kilometers away from downtown. It is divided into several sub-neighborhoods: Kumodraž, Kumodraž I, Kumodraž II and Torlak.

One of the most important Serbian army leaders in modern history, vojvoda Stepa Stepanović, was born in Kumodraž in 1856, and his birthplace has been turned into a memorial house dedicated to him, and the nearby woods are named Stepin Lug ("Stepa's grove"). In addition, the main street in Kumodraž is named Vojvode Stepe (although it begins much closer to downtown, at Autokomanda).

There is a Church of the Holy Trinity in the neighborhood. Next to it is a small cemetery which hosts the memorial to the Serbian soldiers killed during the short Austro-Hungarian occupation of Belgrade in late 1914, within the scopes of the World War I. A memorial was erected at the site of the 1914-1915 seat of the Belgrade Defense Headquarters.

Old Meyhane is located in the central part of the former village. It was built in 1865 as the Ottoman watchpost along the Kragujevac Road. The Serbian government later adapted it into a gendarmerie post during World War I, it was turned into the mayhane and then into the military hospital. Later, it became a kafana, a grocery store, and a library for the "Vojvoda Stepa" elementary school. In time, the arcade porch was replaced with the architrave one and the roof shingles were replaced with the proper roof tiles. It was placed under preliminary state protection, but became derelict over time.

== Kumodraž I ==
Central and western extension of the neighborhood, the core of the modern settlement of Kumodraž. It extends into Kumodraž II on the east, Kumodraž II on the north and Torlak on the north-west. Connected to Belgrade by the bus lines 33 and 39.

== Kumodraž II ==
The northern extension of the neighborhood, which provides an urban connection to the Voždovac neighborhood, is named Kumodraž II. It is a modern sub-neighborhood, located in the area marked by the elbow turn of Kumodraška Street and Vojvode Stepe Street. It extends directly from Voždovac's industrial zone along Kumodraška Street. Connected to Belgrade by Bus Line 25.

== Torlak ==
The entire western section of Kumodraž is a sub-neighborhood of Torlak. It was named after the 308-meter-high hill of Torlak, which was very important in military operations for the defense of Belgrade during World War I.

The surrounding area is forested, with wildlife including roe deer, wild boar and red fox. Animals occasionally descend into the lower, urbanized neighborhoods, such as Stepa Stepanović. With the expansion of the jackals population in the outskirts of Belgrade since the 2000s, jackals were reported in Kumodraž in the spring of 2022.

The Institute of Virology, Vaccines and Sera "Torlak," the Medicines and Medical Devices Agency of Serbia, and the Belgrade University Faculty of Pharmacy are all located in Torlak. In 2021, the construction of a new biomedical and higher education facility was announced across the existing medical complex. The "BIO 4 Campus" will be built on the site of a military complex, which will be demolished. The designs were selected in January 2022. The complex will include the relocated Faculty of Pharmacy, the Belgrade University Faculty of Biology, and the "Torlak" Institute, as well as a science and technology park, a Center of Ideas, a Center for Industrial Development, "Minglarijum" business-commercial center, and hospitality venues, etc.

It was initially announced that the "innovation hub" would cover 7.9 hectares (20 acres) and host 1,300 students. In April 2022, the area was expanded to nearly 20 hectares (49 acres). Construction is planned for 2023, with the campus expected to become operational by 2024. It will be patterned after Imperial College's campus in White City, London. The project was then expanded again in July 2022, when the government announced that the complex would accommodate 1,200 professors and researchers, as well as 4,000 students. Construction was planned to last 18 months, with completion expected in 2025. The total cost is estimated to reach €290 million, comprising (€190 million for construction and €100 million for equipment).

== Sources ==
- Mala Prosvetina Enciklopedija, First edition (1959), Vol.I; Prosveta;
