= Birthplace of Stepa Stepanović =

House in Kumodraž, Belgrade, Serbia

Coordinates: 44.7417°N 20.5187°E

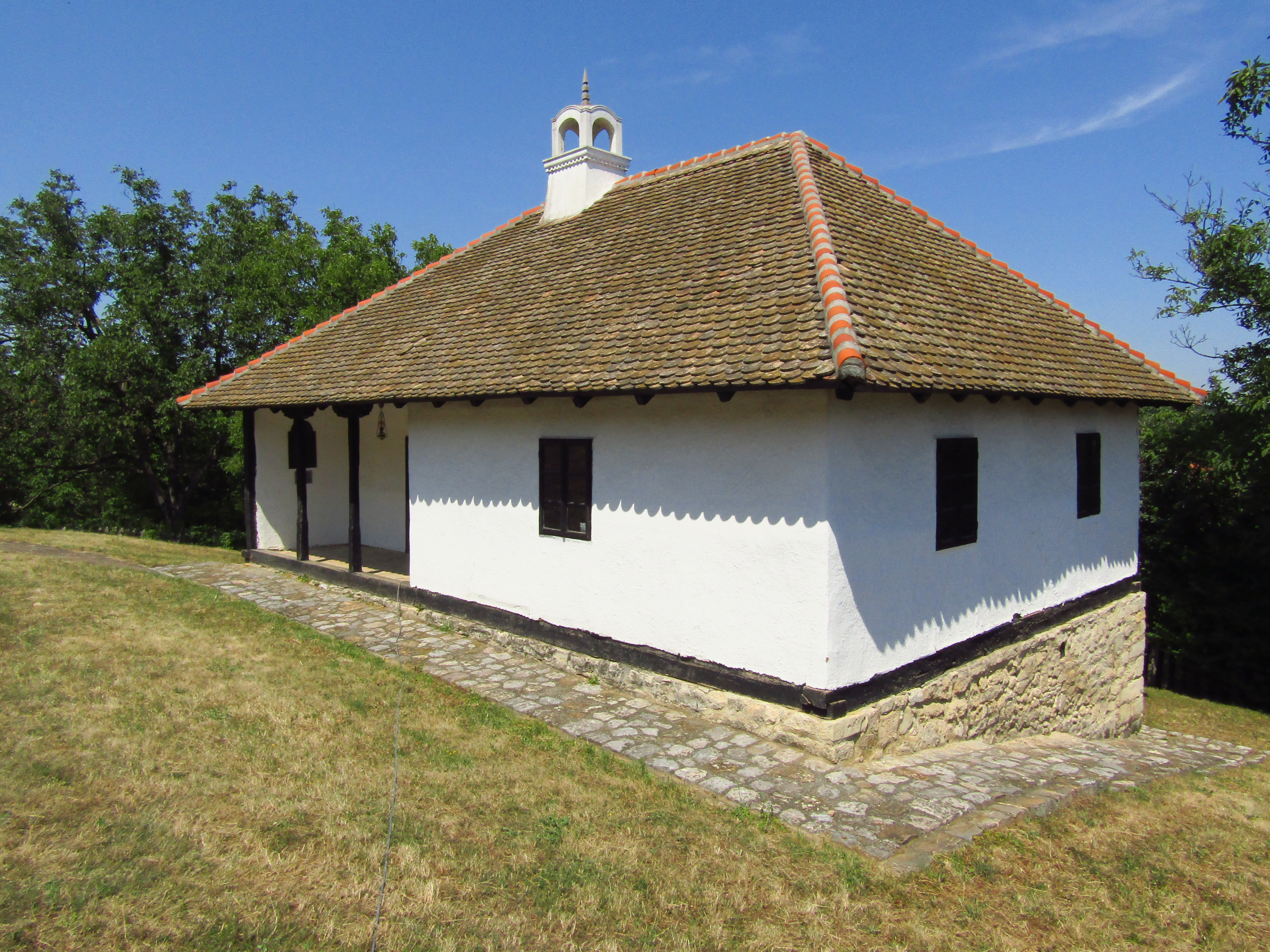
Stepanović's childhood home in Kumodraž (Belgrade)

The birthplace of field marshal Stepa Stepanović in Kumodraž, where the renowned military commandment, a general and field marshal who participated in all wars in which Serbia took part between 1876 and 1918, was born in 1856.

== Architecture ==
Built in the middle of the 19th century, based on its construction characteristics, the house belongs to the older Morava house type, which was a very common type of the house built in the villages around Belgrade. It is of a rectangular shape and consists of three rooms, with a dimension of 10 metres by 8 metres.

The house was built in the timber construction, filled with wattle and daub whereas the foundation is made of broken stone. According to its pitch, the roof was originally covered with shingles. The floors were made of bricks and wood. The roof is four-sided with the construction of the wooden rafters and beams, and covered with beaver tail tiles. The authentic central fireplace was preserved with the old sač (a large dish for bread making). The house is recognizable for its porch made of straight wooden beams (which evolved into the Morava arches in the younger Morava houses).

The organization of the interior is also characteristic. There was a division between the "house“, where the heart and sovra (a low dining table) for daily use were placed, and the "rooms“ for sleeping. This type of a house originates from Kosovo Pomoravlje, from where it spread to the area around Belgrade by the end of the 19th century, due to the migrations of Serbian population.

== Cultural Monument ==
Due to its architectural, ethnographic and memorial values, this house was designated as a Cultural Property of Great Importance. As an example of the vernacular architecture, the importance of this house grows with the time, due to the fact that there are only a few houses of this type preserved in the vicinity of Belgrade. This humble farmhouse was the place of birth of a man whose name represents the synonym for the liberation of Serbia, a general who won the first great victory for the Allies in the Great War.

== Conservation and Restoration Works ==
An extensive conservation and restoration project for the house and two auxiliary structures developed by the Cultural Heritage Protection Institute of the City of Belgrade was carried out between 1984 and 1990, but the planned development of the site into a memorial complex which would offer a variety of educational content has never been completed. A repair plan prepared by the Cultural Heritage Protection Institute of the City of Belgrade in 2013 was carried out with the support of the city council. Although the house was designated as the cultural monument back in 1974, it was not until 2013 that the setting up of the permanent museum exhibitions dedicated to the life of the field marshal Stepa Stepanović was planned within the restoration and conservation plans.
