= Miljakovac =

Miljakovac Миљаковац
- Urban neighbourhood
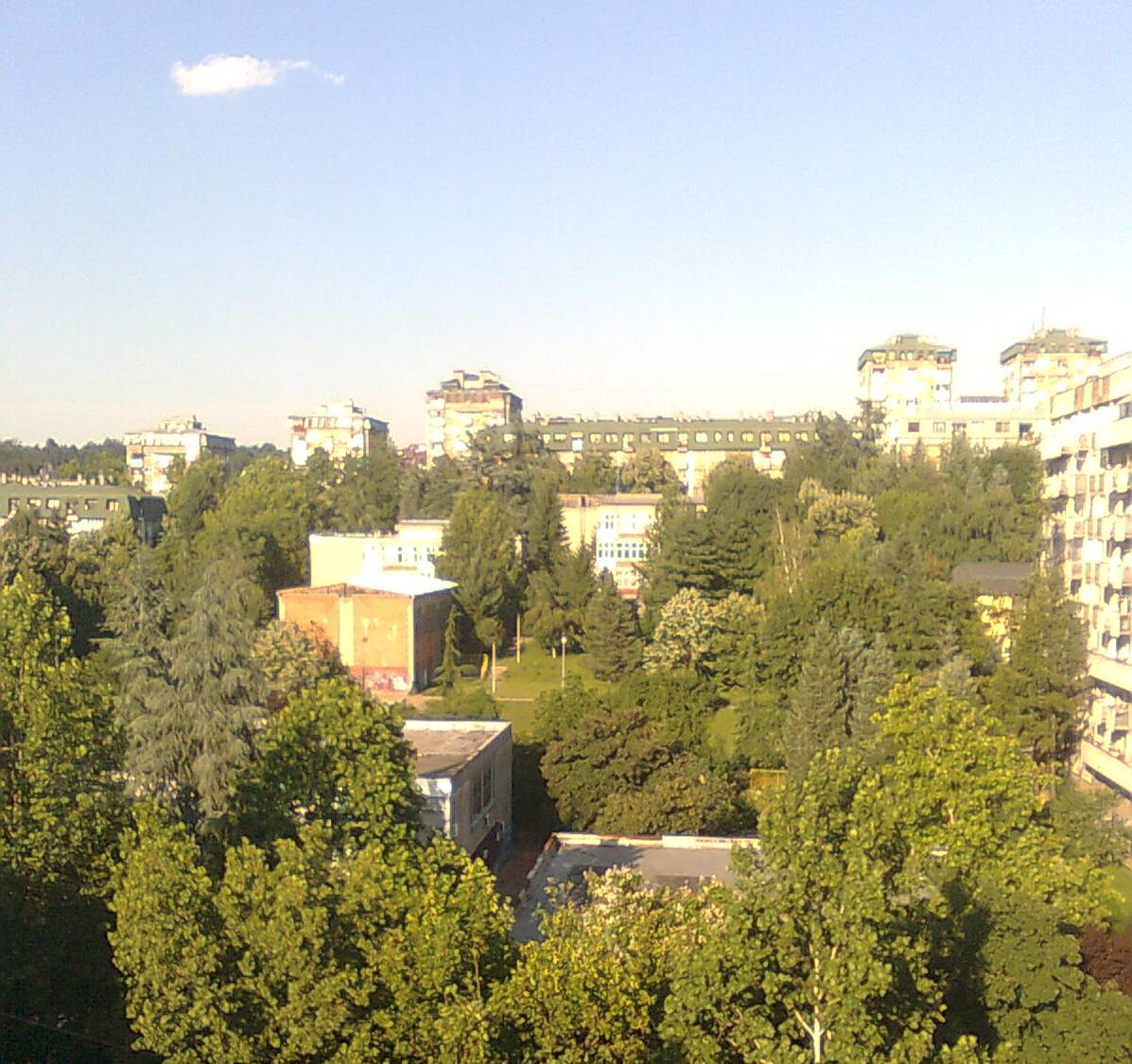
- Part of Miljakovac 1

- Location within Belgrade
- Coordinates: 44°44′38″N 20°27′06″E
- Country: Serbia
- Region: Belgrade
- Municipality: Rakovica

Area
  - Total: 5 km^{2} (1.9 sq mi)
- Elevation: 200 m (660 ft)

Population (2011)
  - Total: 19,932
  - Density: 4,000/km^{2} (10,000/sq mi)
- Time zone: UTC+1 (CET)
  - Summer (DST): UTC+2 (CEST)
- Postal code: 11090
- Area code: +381(0)11
- Car plates: BG

Miljakovac (Serbian: Миљаковац), (pronounced [mǐʎakɔʋats]) is an urban neighborhood of Belgrade, the capital of Serbia. It is located in Belgrade's municipality of Rakovica.

== Location ==
Historical population
Year	Pop.	±%
1981	17,694	—
1991	18,459	+4.3%
2002	18,890	+2.3%
2011	19,932	+5.5%

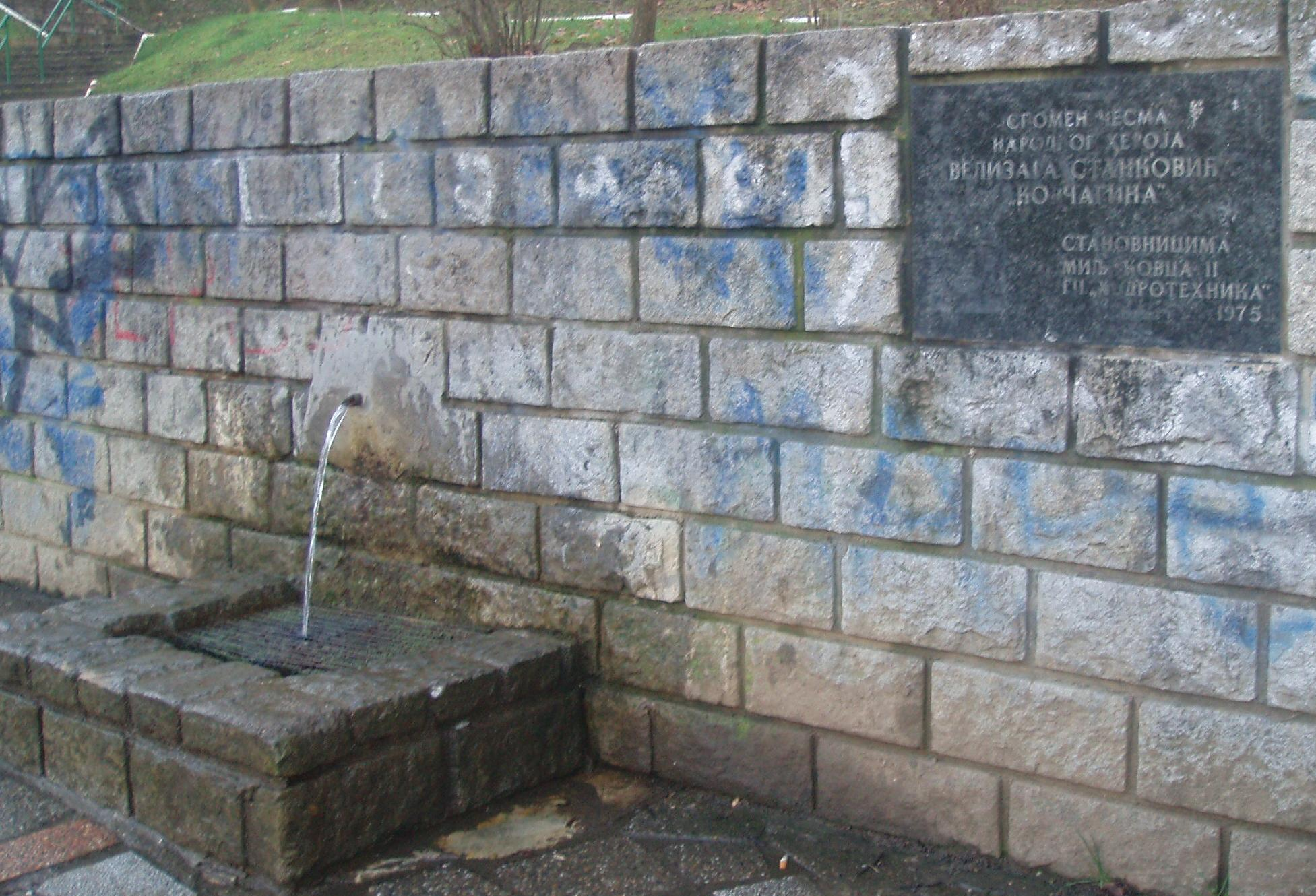
Miljakovac Springs

Miljakovac is located on the northern outskirts of the Miljakovac Forest (Miljakovačka šuma), on the slopes of the Miljakovac hill, 193 metres (633 feet) high, to the south. It is bordered by the neighborhoods of Kanarevo Brdo on the north and Rakovica on the west. It consists of three sub-neighborhoods: Miljakovac I and Milljakovac II which make one continuous built-up area with each other and the rest of Belgrade, and Miljakovac III, further into the Miljakovac wood. All three are residential areas, with a combined population of 19,932 in 2011. The neighborhood is known for the vast green areas, which include parks Miljakovački Izvori and Izvor, and the surrounding Miljakovac Forest.

== Name ==
Name of the neighborhood comes from the archaic word miljak. It denoted a garden or an orchard with small, summer house, outside of the city. There is also a village of Miljkovac outside of the town of Niš. Origin of the word itself comes from milje, meaning pleasure, bliss.

== Miljakovac I ==
Miljakovac I is the oldest section of Miljakovac and was developed in 1970 as a planned, residential area for the workers in the highly industrialized Rakovica, and their families. It makes an urban connection between Rakovica, as its eastern extension, and Kanarevo Brdo. During the NATO bombing of Serbia in 1999, the area suffered much damage due to the constant bombing of Straževica hill with underground military facilities, which is in several kilometers further to the south, but in the same level as Miljakovac I and without any natural obstacles in between. As the local community of Miljakovac within the Rakovica municipality, it had a population of 12,871 in 1981, 12,725 in 1991, 13,427 in 2002 and 12,635 in 2011. In 2010 it was divided in two local communities, Miljakovac (pop. 7,622) and Duško Radović (pop. 5,013).

Park Miljakovački Izvori is located in the neighborhood. It developed from 1983, with the planting of the original 88 plane trees and 88 birches. With the adjoining park Izvor in Miljakovac II, which is separated by the Velizara Stankovića street, it covers an area of 2.12 hectares (5.2 acres). The park is often referred to simply as Miljakovački Park (Miljakovac Park). The section of the park was revitalized on the initiative of the diplomat Keisuke Oba (1935–2002), Japanese chargé d'affaires in Belgrade from 1995 to 1998. After his death, that section was bureaucratically named "Park of the Japanese diplomat Keisuke Oba", but is often referred to as the Park of the Serbian-Japanese Friendship, or colloquially simply as the Japanese Park. In 2012 the park was renovated and an artificial 211 metres (692 feet) long stream was constructed. Stream ends in the pond with the fountain which is surrounded by benches and fitness equipment in the open. Three exhibition pavilions were also constructed.

There is also a park around the seat of the local community of Miljakovac. Named MZ Miljakovac (Local Community Miljakovac), it covers 2.68 hectares (6.6 acres).

=== Buvljak ===
In March 2023, mayor Aleksandar Šapić said that Belgrade's official flea market, Buvljak, will be relocated from the Yuri Gagarin Street in New Belgrade to Miljakovac. Selected location used to be a farmers' market from 1994 to 1999. Original relocation was planned for Bežanija on the completely opposite side of the city, but the idea was put on hold due to the major problems with lots' ownership. Still, Bežanija remains as an option when the legal issues are solved. The works in the Vareška Street, where the market will be located, should be finished by the late October 2023, despite the official info-board at the location said the deadline is December 2024.

The entire adapted area covers 12,000 m^{2} (130,000 sq ft), of which 4,000 m^{2} (43,000 sq ft) is covered market space with 290 stalls and shops. However, there are only 130 parking spots. The market was opened on 14 December 2023.

== Miljakovac II or Miljakovački Izvori ==
Miljakovac II or Miljakovački Izvori is an eastern extension of Miljakovac I, developed on the northeastern section of the Miljakovac wood in 1973. As the local community of Miljakovački Izvori, it had a population of 4,823 in 1981, 5,734 in 1991, 5,463 in 2002 and 7,297 in 2011.

Before it was urbanized, Miljakovac area was covered with pastures, orchards and vineyards. Abundance of the underground waters, including the Miljakovac Springs, (Serbian: Миљаковачки извори, romanized: Miljakovački izvori), prevented earlier urbanization. When Miljakovac II was built in 1973, mayor of Belgrade Branko Pešić decided to change the plans and quit on three projected buildings in order to preserve the springs and their immediate catchment. The President of Yugoslavia Josip Broz Tito also intervened and the water from the spring was conducted to the newly built park Izvor, 150 metres (490 feet) downhill. Additional gravel filtering of the water under the street where the water flows is conducted and in 1975 the memorial drinking fountain was built in the park itself. A kindergarten Izvorčić ("little spring") is built near the springs. In 2011 city government changed the purpose of the catchment area declaring it to be the building land and allowing for the buildings to be constructed. Ever since then, the local population and general public is protesting and as of 2017 the construction still didn't began. In 2012 city authorities even issued the statement saying that there is actually no spring at all: allegedly they conducted 19 drillings and didn't find the source of the water, even though the capacity of the spring is 17.5 m^{3} (620 cu ft) per day.

== Miljakovac III ==
The newest section of Miljakovac, less than a kilometer to the south from Miljakovac II, to which it makes no urban connection. The neighborhood developed on the southern slopes of the Miljakovac Hill and woods of Miljakovac and Manastir (Manastirska šuma). The area originally developed in the 1990s. The neighborhood is still expanding. After the 2010 administrative change in the boundaries of the local communities, Miljakovac III was attached to the newly formed local community Sunčani Breg, which also includes the neighborhoods of Sunčani Breg and Jelezovac, and had a population of 3,018 in 2011. This part got new minibus line 505L which connect it to Miljakovac 1 and 2.

The total forested area covers 1.39 km^{2} (0.54 sq mi). Part of the forest was declared a natural monument in 2010.
