= Straževica =

Hill and neighborhood in Belgrade, Serbia

Coordinates: 44°43′54″N 20°26′29″E

Straževica (Serbian: Стражевица) is a hill and an urban neighborhood of Belgrade, the capital of Serbia. It is located in Belgrade's municipality of Rakovica. The area was the most heavily bombed part of Belgrade during the NATO bombing of Serbia in 1999.

== Location ==
Straževica is located in the central part of the neighborhood, on the 209-metre-high (686 ft) hill of the same name. The neighborhood is small and undeveloped, as most of the hill is turned into Belgrade's most important quarry, Kijevo, and on all sides of the hill already developed separate neighborhoods: Kneževac on the north, Jelezovac and Sunčani Breg on the east, Resnik on the south, Kijevo on the southwest and Labudovo Brdo on the west.

== Kijevo quarry ==
The Straževica slopes are made of rich deposits of sandy-detrital silicified limestone, which are even today exploited in the Kijevo Quarry, which was originally open to supply the railroad company, but also became the main stone source for Belgrade. The entrepreneurs Parapid, Tomić and Marković founded the quarry during the Interbellum.

== Military complex ==
As the Yugoslav Army's Kneževac underground command headquarters were located at Straževica, the area was heavily bombed in 1999, almost on a daily basis, including with some of the largest bombs available at that time (up to 3 tons), which used to shake all of Belgrade. However, as the underground complex was designed to withstand a 20 kiloton blast, it sustained no damage. The facility is located several hundred meters underground, contains 10-ton steel doors, includes biological, chemical and radiological protection, working and sleeping premises and depots, plus a radar antenna. However, some other neighborhoods in the vicinity (most notably Rakovica and Miljakovac) suffered heavy collateral damage from the bombing, while the settlement of Straževica was almost completely destroyed or damaged for the most part, including the Rakovica monastery.

The complex is dangerously close to the Kijevo quarry, which became operational in 1974. In 1987, the perimeter of the quarry was set so that it would not endanger the site. In 2006, as the quarry expanded further, the army appealed to the Serbian government to intervene. However, the new owner of the quarry, the Italian company Adige Bitumi, continued the works, damaging the complex with underground explosions.

As Straževica was one of the first targets to be bombed in Serbia, one of the most attacked targets in general, and the first bombed location in Belgrade itself, there is a memorial on the hill, named "Herald of Straževica", commemorating the 1999 bombing.

== Glasnik monument ==
In the summer of 2002, the monument was built on top of the hill, within the military complex. It was named "Glasnik" ("Herald"). The monument has the base in the shape of F 117 aircraft, surrounded by the large slabs of granite. At the bottom of the central part there is a relief, representing images of army officers Vlastimir Lazarević and Vladimir Vujović. They were repairing damaged antenna in 1999, trying to use the period after one wave of bombing, but the next wave ensued quickly killing them both.

The sculpture was made by Slaviša Čeković. It is made of various metal debris, grenade shrapnel, parts of military antennae and pieces of metal constructions. On top of it is the antenna which is disconnected, but still operational, so it could be used eventually. Artistically, the sculpture is described as the "slightly tousled constructivism" with the touch of Vladimir Tatlin, while the style is characterized as Yves Tanguy's play on the unusual contraptions form.

== Transportation ==
The first lane of the "Straževica tunnel", a 745 m (2,444 ft) long part of the projected Belgrade's outer beltway (47 km (29 mi) long Batajnica-Bubanj Potok section) was dug in January 2007 and the digging of the second lane was to begin soon. Digging of the tunnel originally began in 1992 (of the beltway itself in 1990), but was halted in 1996 and then resumed in September 2004. As the regulations of the European Union do not allow for highways to go right through the middle of the cities' urban tissue (which is the case with the Pan-European corridor X in Belgrade), Serbian government got 3 years to finish the beltway, but it wasn't finished in time.

Since 2012, the right tube functioned as the two-way tunnel. Two sides of the left, 733 m (2,405 ft) long tube, were connected only on 9 June 2020. The deadline for the tube to become operational, so as the complete tunnel, was moved for the early 2022. On the western slopes of the hill, two 30 metres (98 ft) elevated bridges were built on the Orlovača-Straževica section of the beltway. They are crossing streams of Topčiderska reka and Kijevski potok, and two railway tracks. The left tube was officially opened for traffic on 15 June 2022. At the time, construction of the elevated circular road was underway. Located a bit further from the eastern entry into the tunnel, the "Straževica" overpass will cross over the newly constructed beltway.
