= Trošarina =

Urban neighborhood of Belgrade

Trošarina Трошарина
- Urban neighbourhood
- Location within Belgrade
- Coordinates: 44.7619°N 20.4833°E
- Country: Serbia
- Region: Belgrade
- Municipality: Voždovac
- Time zone: UTC+1 (CET)
  - Summer (DST): UTC+2 (CEST)
- Area code: +381(0)11
- Car plates: BG

Trošarina (Serbian: Трошарина) is an urban neighborhood of Belgrade, the capital of Serbia. It is located in the municipality of Voždovac.

== Location ==
Trošarina is located around the crossroads of the Boulevard of Liberation, Kružni put and Crnotravska streets.

== History ==
In 1821, the state government decided to put the food trade in order and to establish the quantity and quality of the goods imported to the city. Part of the project was introduction of the excise on the goods (in Serbian called trošarina) and setting of a series of excise check points on the roads leading to the city. One of those check points, which all gradually also became known as trošarina, was on the Avala Road. As the neighborhood later expanded around it, it was named after it.

In 1930, the first road in Serbia paved with asphalt was built from Trošarina to the Avala mountain, as the new Avala road. It was also the first traffic route in the state marked with the horizontal road surface markings and the regular traffic signs. The road was used for the Interbellum rallies, which continued after World War II. Record holder, for over 20 years, was Dowager Queen Maria, an avid driver, in her Rolls-Royce. She stopped driving on her own after her husband, King Alexander was assassinated in the car, in 1934 in Marseille. Her record was broken only in the 1950s by Milivoje Božić in a Porsche.

== Characteristics ==
It is a mixed, residential-industrial area. It has several constructing facilities (Tunelogradnja, Larabo, etc.), a gas station and it is a starting station for several intercity bus lines (401, 402, 403, 404, 405, 407, 503) which connect Belgrade and the suburban settlements in the municipalities of Voždovac and Barajevo.

Central street in the neighborhood, Save Maškovića, though short and narrow, is important for city traffic. It connects two major thoroughfares in this part of the city, Vojvode Stepe and Bulevar Oslobođenja, and the parts of Belgrade sprawling further. The street was known for traffic congestion for decades. As it was envisioned as part of the future inner city beltway, the widening of the street began in December 2020, doubling the street from two to four lanes.
