= Voždovac =

Voždovac Вождовац (Serbian)
- Municipality
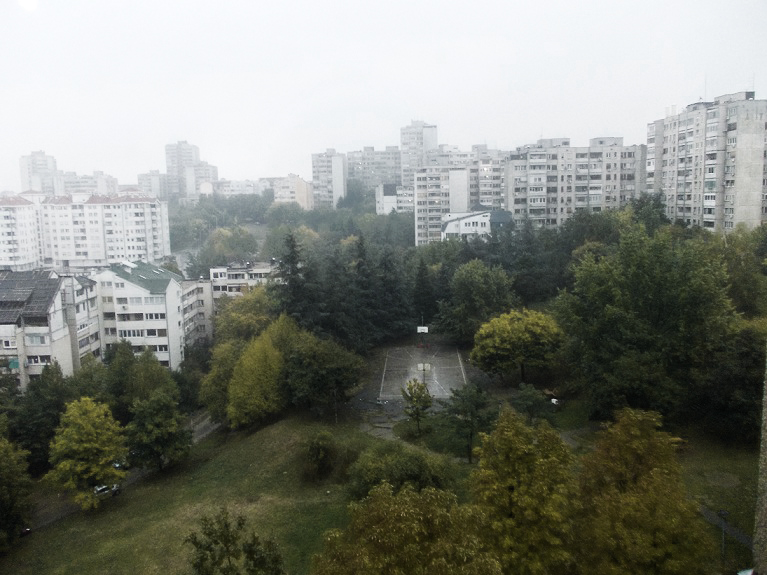
- Braće Jerković neighbourhood

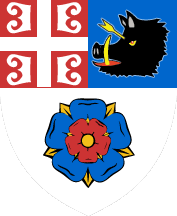
- Coat of arms

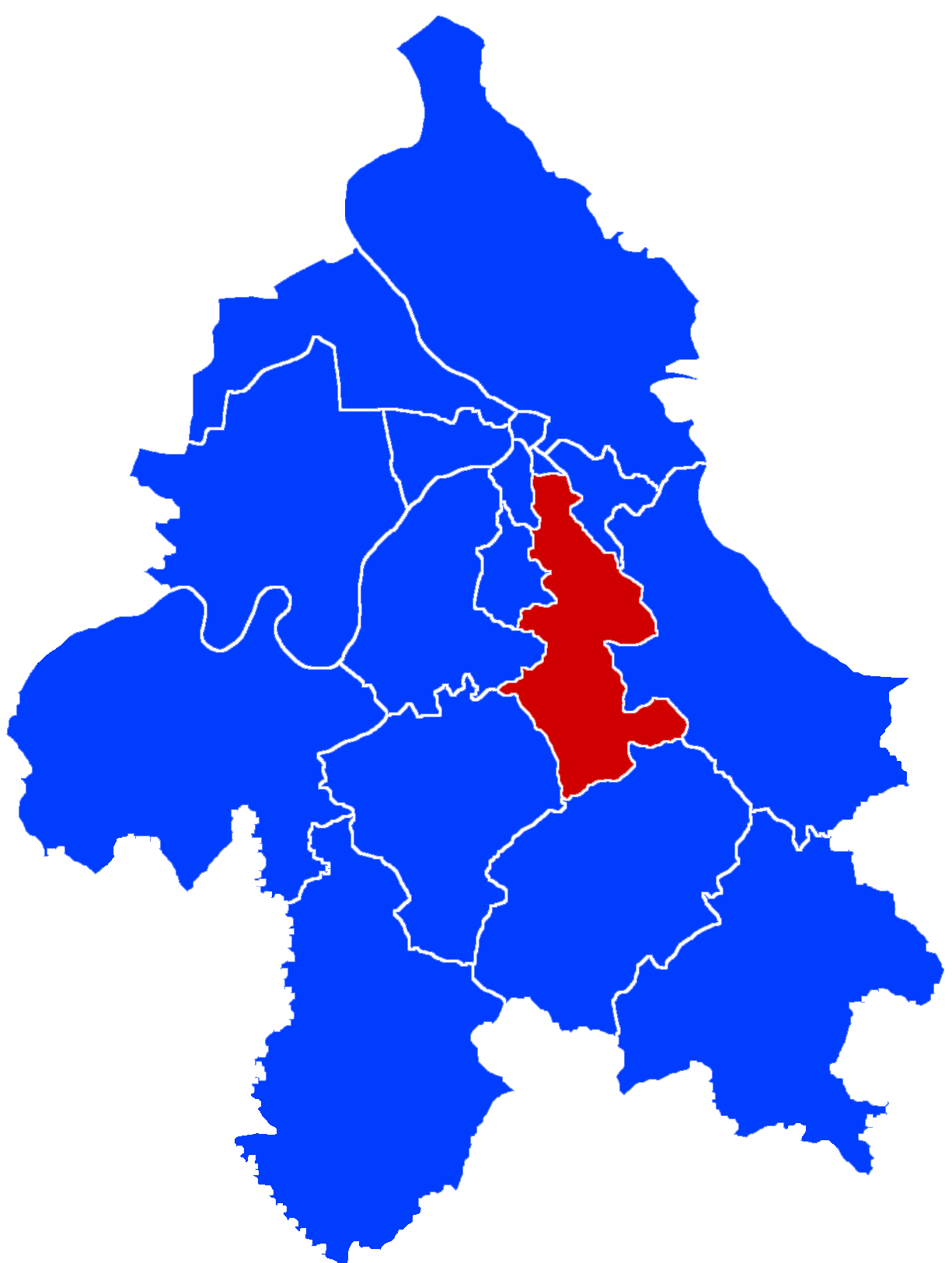
- Location of Voždovac within the city of Belgrade
- Interactive map of Voždovac
- Coordinates: 44°47′N 20°29′E
- Country: Serbia
- City: Belgrade
- Status: Municipality
- Settlements: 5

Government
  - Type: Municipality of Belgrade
  - Mun. president: Bojana Jakšić (SNS)

Area
  - Municipality: 148.50 km^{2} (57.34 sq mi)
  - Urban: 56.92 km^{2} (21.98 sq mi)

Population (2022)
  - Municipality: 174,864
  - Density: 1,177.5/km^{2} (3,049.8/sq mi)
- Time zone: UTC+1 (CET)
  - Summer (DST): UTC+2 (CEST)
- Postal code: 11040
- Area code: +381(0)11
- Car plates: BG
- Website: www.vozdovac.rs

Voždovac (Serbian Cyrillic: Вождовац, pronounced [ʋǒːʒdoʋats]) is a municipality of the city of Belgrade. According to the 2022 census results, the municipality has a population of 174,864 inhabitants.

The municipality is located in the south-central part of the urban area of Belgrade and in the central section of the wider Belgrade City area. It stretches meridionally (north to south) for almost 40 kilometers (25 mi), spreading to the south more than any other municipality of Belgrade. Due to its shape, it borders more municipalities than any other: Vračar on the north, Zvezdara on the north-east, Grocka on the east, Sopot on the south, Barajevo on the south-west, Čukarica and Rakovica on the west and Savski Venac on the north-west.

== History ==
The municipality of Voždovac originates from 1904. In 1945 Belgrade was divided into districts (rejon) and Voždovac became part of District VI. In 1952 the districts were abolished and the municipalities re-established. Municipality of Pašino Brdo was annexed to Voždovac on September 1, 1955 and today makes its northernmost part. The municipality was territorially shaped in the early 1960s when the municipality of Ripanj was added to Voždovac (the village of Veliki Mokri Lug was later detached and annexed to the municipality of Zvezdara). However, shaped this way, the elongated municipality causes problem to the inhabitants of its southern part as they have to travel over 30 kilometers (19 mi) to the municipal assembly. There is an idea of separating suburban settlements (Beli Potok, Pinosava, Zuce, Ripanj) and creating new sub-Avalan municipality (Avalski Venac), with the village of Vrčin in the municipality of Grocka but no official move has been done so far in that direction.

== Geography ==
The municipality is located in the northern section of the Šumadija region ("Low Šumadija"). The southern part covers the northern section of the woods of Lipovička šuma and roughly corresponds to the valley of the Topčiderka river which flows between the Pinosava and Ripanj plateaux. The central area is occupied by one of two "Belgrade" mountains, the 511 meters (1,677 ft) -high Avala (the other one being Kosmaj). In the northern, urban section, Voždovac covers several of the 32 hills on which Belgrade is built, including Torlak and Pašino Brdo.

Apart from Topčiderka, numerous smaller rivers and intermittent creeks flow in the northern part of the municipality: Zavojnička reka, Vranovac, Milošev potok, Bubanj Potok, Kamena voda, Lipica, Drenjak, Kumodraški potok and parts of Rakovički potok, Bolečica and Jelezovac. The spring and the valley of the former Mokroluški Potok (now mostly conducted underground) is also located in the municipality. Despite having large wooded areas in the non-urban section (slopes of Avala, northern part of Lipovička šuma, Stepin Lug/Gaj), the urban area has only one real park, Šumice.

== Settlements ==
The municipality of Voždovac has both urban neighborhoods of the Belgrade City proper (uža teritorija grada) and separate, suburban settlements in the Belgrade City Metro area. Urban:

- Autokomanda
- Banjica
- Banjica II
- Braće Jerković I
- Braće Jerković II
- Braće Jerković III
- Dušanovac
- Jajinci
- Kumodraž I
- Kumodraž II
- Lekino Brdo
- Mala Utrina
- Marinkova Bara
- Medaković I
- Medaković II
- Medaković III
- Mitrovo Brdo
- Pašino Brdo
- Selo Rakovica
- Siva Stena
- Šumice
- Torlak
- Trošarina
- Veljko Vlahović
- Voždovac

Suburban towns:

- Beli Potok
- Pinosava

Suburban rural:

- Bubanj Potok
- Gaj
- Selo Kumodraž
- Ripanj
- Stepin Lug
- Šuplja Stena
- Zuce

Neighborhoods of Ripanj:

- Bela Zemlja
- Brđani
- Čaršija
- Kablar
- Kolonija
- Prnjavor
- Stepašinovac
- Stražarija
- Trešnja

== Demographics ==
Historical population
Year	Pop.	±% p.a.
1948	52,338	—
1953	61,200	+3.18%
1961	85,458	+4.26%
1971	134,206	+4.62%
1981	159,364	+1.73%
1991	161,376	+0.13%
2002	151,768	−0.56%
2011	158,213	+0.46%
2022	174,864	+0.91%

The massive population growth was halted in the late 1980s, despite still growing settlements on the southern and south-eastern outskirts of Belgrade. Still, with 1,061.8/km^{2} (2,750/sq mi), Voždovac is still densely populated, especially concerning large unurbanized areas in the south. Population of Voždovac according to the official census of population (since 1991 a new methodology is used):

=== Ethnic groups ===
The ethnic composition of the municipality:

Ethnic group	Population	Percent
Serbs	153,674	87.9%
Romani	948	0.54%
Yugoslavs	911	0.52%
Montenegrins	520	0.3%
Macedonians	459	0.26%
Russians	422	0.24%
Croats	377	0.22%
Gorani	285	0.16%
Muslims	214	0.12%
Bosniaks	167	0.1%
Hungarians	128	0.07%
Slovenians	110	0.06%
Albanians	95	0.05%
Bulgarians	86	0.05%
Romanians	59	0.03%
Slovaks	53	0.03%
Others	898	0.51%
Undeclared/Unknown	15,458	8.84%
Total	174,864	

== Administration ==
Presidents of the municipality:

- 1952–1955: Nikola Stepanović (b.1916)
- 1955–1956: Vučko Ivković (b.1913)
- 1956–1965: Petar Kolundžija
- 1965–1973: Zoran Nastić
- 1973–1978: Munir Lasić (d.2013)
- 1978–1982: Dragomir Marić
- 1982–1986: Borislav Kuzmanović
- 1986–1988: Milorad Leković
- 1988–1991: Zoran Višnjić
- 1991–1992: Zoran Antonić (b.1934, d.2009)
- 1992–1994: Božidar Simatković
- 1994–1996: Zoran Modrinić (b.1947)
- 1997–October 12, 2000: Nebojša Atanacković (b.1943)
- October 12, 2000 – December 9, 2004: Stevan Radović (b.1940)
- December 9, 2004 – January 27, 2010: Goran Lukačević (b.1966)
- January 27, 2010 – January 31, 2014: Dragan Vukanić (b.1956)
- January 31, 2014 – September 4, 2020: Aleksandar Savić (b.1971)
- September 4, 2020 – present: Ivana Ilić-Tomić (b. 1982)

== Neighborhood ==
=== Location ===
The neighborhood of Voždovac is located 4 to 5 kilometres (2 to 3 miles) south of downtown Belgrade, on a hill in the northern part of the municipality. Three long, more or less parallel streets shape the neighborhood into an elongated form in the north-west to south-east direction: western border is marked by Bulevar Oslobođenja (Boulevard of Liberation), which also makes the border to the municipality of Savski Venac, eastern by Kumodraška Street, while Vojvode Stepe Street stretches in between. Due to its shape, Voždovac borders many other neighborhoods: Autokomanda to the north, Diplomatska Kolonija on the north-west, Banjica (and Banjica Forest) on the west, Trošarina and Banjica II on the south-west, Kumodraž (its sub-neighborhoods of Kumodraž II and Torlak) on the south, Braće Jerković II and Mitrovo Brdo on the south-east, Braće Jerković on the east and Dušanovac on the north-east.

=== Name and history ===
Name Voždovac is derived from the word vožd meaning leader (literally, a "duke", "supreme vojvoda"), one of the titles used by the Karađorđe Petrović, the leader of the First Serbian Uprising. He also commanded the liberation of Belgrade from the Turks in 1806, and on the very spot from where he started that operation today stands a Church of the Saint Emperor Constantine and Helena, popularly called the Voždovac Church (Voždovačka crkva). The spot he has chosen was outside of the "Laudan's trench", too distant for the Turks inside the trench to notice the Serbian fighters gathering but close enough to take the chargeon the trench. Unofficial name, Voždovo predgrađe, Vožd's Suburb, was recorded after 1903, after the Karađorđević dynasty was restored on Serbian throne.

After the liberation in World War I in 1918, Voždovac was placed under the Belgrade's administrative rule. A string of new neighborhoods encircled eastern outskirts of Belgrade, with names usually containing "suburb" and some member of the royal family. These original names either never became popular or were suppressed after World War II and replaced. The inspiration for the design of the neighborhoods came from the 1912 complex built along the Daviel Street in Paris. It consisted of 40 one-floor houses with gardens, indented from the main street. Settlement that subsequently developed was known as Činovnička Kolonija (Clerk's colony). Still operational elementary school "Branislav Nušić" was built in 1935 and the neighborhood was officially named "Predgrađe Kraljice Marije" or Queen Maria's Suburb, after the dowager queen Maria of Yugoslavia. Later, inhabitants colloquially began to use name Voždovac which spread and was adopted as the official name.

During World War II in Yugoslavia, the outlying areas of Voždovac were the location of the Banjica concentration camp, the Jajinci execution site and other places where victims of the Holocaust and Porajmos were executed.

From June 1945 to December 1946, Voždovac was one of 5 administrative neighborhoods within Belgrade’s Raion VI.

=== Characteristics ===
Originally a residential area, as the neighborhood was growing and stretching to the south, it developed different features. The south-western extension to Torlak, along the Vojvode Stepe street, developed almost rural look, while the southern extension into the Kumodraž II is turned into one of the most heavily industrialized areas in the "Old Belgrade". The western area, along the Boulevard of Liberation became somewhat of an elite neighborhood. Three faculties of the University of Belgrade are located in the neighborhood: Management (FON), Political sciences (FPN) and Transportation. Population of the neighborhood was 22,516 in 2002 and 23,153 in 2011.

The Church of the Saint Emperor Constantine and Empress Helena, colloquially called the Voždovac Church, is one of the neighborhood's landmarks. It was damaged during World War I, but was reconstructed by 1926. Reconstruction design was drafted by architect Dragomir Tadić, who also designed a new, larger church, which replaced the old one. The new church was opened on 1 December 1970. Icons were painted by Milić od Mačve, in the atypical manner, ignoring any schematism or traditional style. Clergy house was consecrated in 2011. Interior painting was done by Vojislav Luković.

Vojvode Stepe street is one of the main traffic routes in this part of Belgrade. What was announced as a massive reconstruction of the street began in July 2014 and lasted to July 2015. The original project, which envisioned the work in phases which would allow for the partial usage of the street, was soon abandoned as the company which done the reconstruction, "Ratko Mitrоvić", started getting late even during the preparation stage so they simply closed the entire street. Also, it turned out that it is not the full reconstruction, as the underground installations weren't replaced. Closing of the street caused massive disturbance of the traffic in this part of the city and economic damage to the stores and craftshops along the street. "Ratko Mitrović" asked for an extension of 72 days, but was granted 20 days by the city, to which they allegedly complied. However, after the street was officially open by the Mayor of Belgrade Siniša Mali, the works continued for weeks. Also, the completed job was of a low quality: badly projected pathways for the visually impaired, parts of the sidewalks, drains, etc. Since the first rains, a pond would form at the bottom end of the street. Mali accused the previous city administration for the "bad contract", but he was already heading the city for 9 months when the works began. He also threatened the "Ratko Mitrović" that they will be fined for the delays, but instead granted them the extension of the deadline and the city hired the same company for further projects.

== Economy ==
Suburban parts of the municipality are mostly agricultural, but the urban section has a large industrial zone, one of the largest in the city, mostly along the Kumodraška street. It comprises the factories of Vatrosprem, Tunelogradnja, Soko Štark, Napred, Montaža, Ratko Mitrović, etc. Some facilities of the Belgrade's Communal Company and of Electricity company (EDB) are located in the neighborhood of Marinkova Bara, along the highway. A small center of the building companies and cement plants is growing along Bubanj Potok.

Administrative center of the municipality is located in Dušanovac, along the Ustanička street. It encompasses the building of the Municipal assembly, the police and fire station, the local clinical-ambulance center, the Fifth Municipal Court of Belgrade and the Special section of the Supreme court of Serbia for organized crime and war crimes (formerly the Supreme Military Court of Yugoslavia).

The Belgrade-Niš highway passes through the northern and eastern parts of the municipality while the road of Kružni put (and the projected Belgrade beltway) goes through the central parts, including the junction of two roads and tollbooth on Bubanj Potok, which marks the entrance into the Belgrade City proper. A railway also goes through the municipality, parallel to the Kružni put.

The following table gives a preview of total number of registered people employed in legal entities per their core activity (as of 2018):

Activity	Total
Agriculture, forestry and fishing	172
Mining and quarrying	26
Manufacturing	5,876
Electricity, gas, steam and air conditioning supply	832
Water supply; sewerage, waste management and remediation activities	1,091
Construction	5,525
Wholesale and retail trade, repair of motor vehicles and motorcycles	10,046
Transportation and storage	2,368
Accommodation and food services	1,886
Information and communication	2,391
Financial and insurance activities	756
Real estate activities	193
Professional, scientific and technical activities	4,442
Administrative and support service activities	6,070
Public administration and defense; compulsory social security	3,002
Education	4,088
Human health and social work activities	2,782
Arts, entertainment and recreation	1,065
Other service activities	1,027
Individual agricultural workers	25
Total	53,644

== Sports ==
FK Voždovac are the neighbourhood team with significant local support. They play at the Voždovac Stadium. Rad are biggest club from Voždovac municipality of Belgrade, with biggest tradition off all local clubs, and played in European UEFA Competitions. Rad played in Yugoslav top league in the 1980s.

== International cooperation ==
Voždovac is twinned with following cities and municipalities:

- Lixouri, Greece
- Šempeter, Slovenia

And has signed friendship charters with following cities and municipalities:

- Drežnica, Slovenia
- Milići, Bosnia and Herzegovina
- Nea Penteli, Greece
- Ogulin, Croatia
- Pula, Croatia

== See also ==
- Subdivisions of Belgrade
- List of Belgrade neighborhoods and suburbs

== Sources ==
- Mala Prosvetina Enciklopedija, Third edition (1986); Prosveta; ISBN 86-07-00001-2
- Jovan Đ. Marković (1990): Enciklopedijski geografski leksikon Jugoslavije; Svjetlost-Sarajevo; ISBN 86-01-02651-6
