= Jajinci =

Jajinci Јајинци
- Urban neighbourhood
- Interactive map of Jajinci
- Location within Belgrade
- Coordinates: 44°44′N 20°29′E
- Country: Serbia
- Region: Belgrade
- Municipality: Voždovac

Area
  - Total: 5.13 km^{2} (1.98 sq mi)
- Time zone: UTC+1 (CET)
  - Summer (DST): UTC+2 (CEST)
- Area code: +381(0)11
- Car plates: BG

Jajinci (Serbian Cyrillic: Јајинци, pronounced [jâjiːntsi]) is an urban neighborhood located in the municipality of Voždovac, in Belgrade, Serbia.

During World War II, it was the site of the worst carnage in Serbia when German occupational forces executed nearly 80,000 people, in today's Jajinci Memorial Park.

== Location ==
Jajinci is located in the Lipnica creek valley. Once a small village far from downtown Belgrade, Jajinci today has grown into one continuous metropolitan area with the rest of the city. It borders the neighborhoods of Banjica on the north, Kumodraž on the east, and Selo Rakovica on the south. The eastern border of the neighborhood is marked by the Jelezovac creek, which also forms a border with the municipality of Rakovica.

== Characteristics ==
Boža Radulović, merchant, brought the first car in Belgrade on 3 April 1903, and hired a photographer Sreten Kostić as his driver. Kostić, who later became a professional, even a royal driver, built a house in Jajinci in the 1920s, close to the popular kafana "Župa". There, at the curve on the Avala Road, Kostić placed the first modern traffic sign in Belgrade, which said држи десно, or "keep right". Thanks to him, Avala Road became the first concrete paved street in Belgrade, and Župa location became a pitstop in the first races organized in the city. In 2018, two streets in the vicinity of the former kafana were named after Sreten Kostić and Župa.

The settlement spreads from the central street, the Boulevard of Liberation, which starts in central Belgrade (the Slavija square). A former village and separate settlement, Jajinci is today a local community (mesna zajednica) within the municipality of Voždovac. Unlike neighboring Banjica, it was never developed with high modern buildings and remained a settlement of smaller, family houses, but did evolve from agricultural into a typical suburban area with most inhabitants working in Belgrade.

A large rasadnik (nursery garden) is located in the north of the neighborhood, and the "Jajinci" memorial park is in the southern section.

Arrangement of the large forest area within the memorial park began in the 1950s. By 2010, the forested complex covered 81.45 hectares (201.3 acres).

In September 2023 city's plan for urbanization of the southwest section of the neighborhood, along the Jakova Galusa Street, was announced. In the area of 12 ha (30 acres) numerous commercial and residential structures are planned, which would lift a number of inhabitants in this section from 357 to 1,050.

== Mala Utrina ==
A western sub-settlement of Jajinci located along the lower course of the Lipovica creek, near where it flows into the Jelezovac. It is a direct extension of the rasadnik in the north.

It is situated 500 m (1,600 ft) from the Banjica direction. As of 2018, it still lacked proper communal infrastructure.

== Maxima ==
A southern sub-settlement of Jajinci. Because of luxury houses, mansions and villas, people call this part of Jajinci New Dedinje.

== Population ==
Historical population
Year	Pop.	±%
1910	458	—
1921	489	+6.8%
1931	922	+88.5%
1948	875	−5.1%
1953	1,080	+23.4%
1961	2,572	+138.1%
1971	3,879	+50.8%
1981	4,386	+13.1%
1991	4,396	+0.2%
2002	6,986	+58.9%
2011	8,876	+27.1%

Jajinci was a separate settlement until 1972 when it was officially annexed into the Belgrade City Proper (uža teritorija grada). In the 20th century it experienced constant population growth until the 1990s. The Yugoslav Wars brought a large influx of refugees, and Jajinci continued to grow in the early 2000s.

== World War II ==
A former military shooting ground near Jajinci was used by the Nazis as an execution place for almost 80,000 people in the period between 1941 and 1944, most of them Serbs, Jews and Roma. Victims were mostly gathered and sent to the execution by the occupational Nazi forces in Serbia, but also by the Independent State of Croatia authorities and the Serbian Quisling regime. Many of them were prisoners, either Communists or public figures opposing the German occupation, from the Banjica concentration camp, but the detainees and prisoners from Staro Sajmište concentration camp, and Gestapo's and special police prisons. Jajinci is the largest World War II execution site in Serbia.

First arrangement of the area into an open memorial was finished in 1951. A large memorial park, the Jajinci Memorial Park, with a monument to the victims, was opened on 20 October 1964, marking the 20th anniversary of the Partisan army entering Belgrade.

== Sources ==
- Mala Prosvetina Enciklopedija, Third edition (1985); Prosveta; ISBN 86-07-00001-2
- Jovan Đ. Marković (1990): Enciklopedijski geografski leksikon Jugoslavije; Svjetlost-Sarajevo; ISBN 86-01-02651-6
