= Sunčani Breg =

Sunčani Breg Сунчани Брег
- Urban neighbourhood
- Location within Belgrade
- Coordinates: 44.727314°N 20.454805°E
- Country: Serbia
- Region: Belgrade
- Municipality: Rakovica
- Local community: Sunčani Breg
- Established: 1990s

Population (2011)
  - Total: 3,018
- Time zone: UTC+1 (CET)
  - Summer (DST): UTC+2 (CEST)
- Area code: +381(0)11
- Car plates: BG

Sunčani Breg (Serbian: Сунчани Брег) is an urban neighborhood of Belgrade, the capital of Serbia. It is located in the Belgrade's municipality of Rakovica.

== Location ==
Sunčani Breg is the sub-neighborhood of Miljakovac, in its southern section, close to the quarry and the neighborhood of Straževica and Jelezovac, along the road of Kružni put. To the north and north-east it extends into the neighborhood of Miljakovac III.

The neighborhood is situated on the southeast slopes of the 209-metre-high (686 ft) Straževica hill.

== History ==
The Settlement developed in the mid 1990s. In plans for the urbanization of this area, it is projected as the one neighborhood with Jelezovac, Sunčani Breg-Jelezovac. In 2015, Suncani Breg had a new road constructed in order to connect it to Miljakovac with the City of Belgrade financing it. By 2024, the settlement had been connected to mainstream water and waste facilities for the first time as part of a decade of urban regeneration.

In 2018, Sunčani Breghad its first basketball court installed. It was opened by players of the Serbia national basketball team playing an exhibition against the Sunčani Breg residents, with the Minister of Internal Affairs Milosav Milicković and the President of the Olympic Committee of Serbia Božidar Maljković in attendance.

== Characteristics ==
The name of the neighborhood is descriptive, meaning sunny hill in Serbian. In 2009 it had about 300 houses.

== Population ==
Local community of Sunčani Breg, detached from the local community of Miljakovac, had a population of 3,018 in 2011.
