= Selo Rakovica =

Urban neighborhood of Belgrade in the municipality of Voždovac

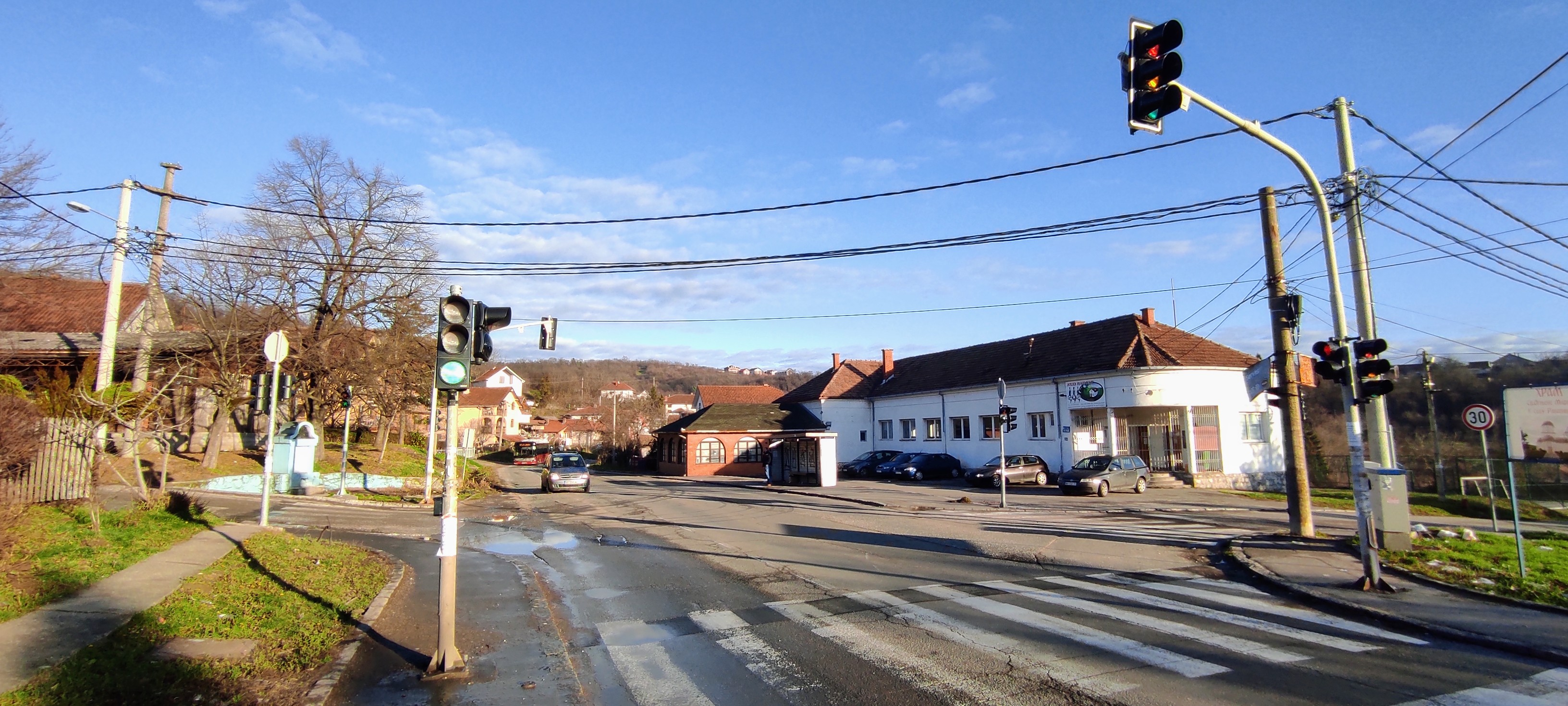
Selo Rakovica

Selo Rakovica (Serbian: Село Раковица) is an urban neighborhood of Belgrade, the capital of Serbia. It is located in Belgrade's municipality of Voždovac and should not be confused with the neighborhood of Rakovica in the municipality of the same name.

== Location ==
Selo Rakovica is located in the central part of the municipality, in the valley of the creeks of Rakovički potok and Milošev potok, some 10 kilometers south-east of downtown Belgrade. Once a small village distant from downtown, Selo Rakovica today grew into one continuous built-up area with the rest of the city, bordering the neighborhoods of Jajinci on the north and Pinosava on the south.

== Characteristics ==
Historical population
Year	Pop.	±%
1981	1,560	—
1991	1,850	+18.6%
2002	2,661	+43.8%
2011	3,292	+23.7%

At the time, Selo Rakovica got the official prefix selo (Serbian for "village") to make a distinction from the much larger, industrial suburb of Rakovica. However, in the 1970s, Selo Rakovica was also annexed to the Belgrade City proper (uža teritorija grada) but the style Selo remained in an unofficial use. It is completely residential area with a population of 2,661 in 2002.

The settlement spreads from the central street, the Boulevard of Liberation, which starts in central Belgrade (the Slavija square).. As the settlement was growing, it spread to the south reaching the major road in the southern outskirts of Belgrade, the Kružni put. From that intersection, the Boulevard of Liberation is known as Avalski put (Avala road) and continues further to the south to the mountain of Avala.

In May 2023, construction of an animal center began. The center will be part of the BIO 4 Campus, a new biomedical and higher learning facility in Torlak. It will host animals used both by the BIO 4 Campus and the Institute of Virology, Vaccines and Sera "Torlak". The complex in Selo Rakovica will also include a laboratory and a veterinary center.
