= List of hills in Belgrade =

This is a list of hills in Belgrade, the capital of Serbia.

- Avala
- Banjičko Brdo (Banjica)
- Banovo Brdo
- Belo Brdo
- Ćurtovo Brdo
- Dedinjsko Brdo (Dedinje)
- Erino Brdo
- Glumčevo Brdo
- Golo Brdo
- Julino Brdo
- Kalemegdansko Brdo (Kalemegdan)
- Kanarevo Brdo
- Labudovo Brdo
- Lekino Brdo
- Lisasto Brdo
- Lozovičko Brdo
- Maleško Brdo
- Milićevo Brdo
- Mitrovo Brdo
- Moračko Brdo
- Nikino Brdo
- Orlovo Brdo
- Pašino Brdo
- Petlovo Brdo
- Stanovačko Brdo
- Starac-Vasino Brdo
- Stojčino Brdo
- Topčidersko Brdo (Topčider)
- Veliko Brdo
- Vodičko Brdo
- Vračarsko Brdo (Vračar)
- Žuto Brdo
- Zvezdarsko Brdo (Zvezdara)
