= Resnik, Belgrade =

Resnik Ресник
- Urban neighbourhood
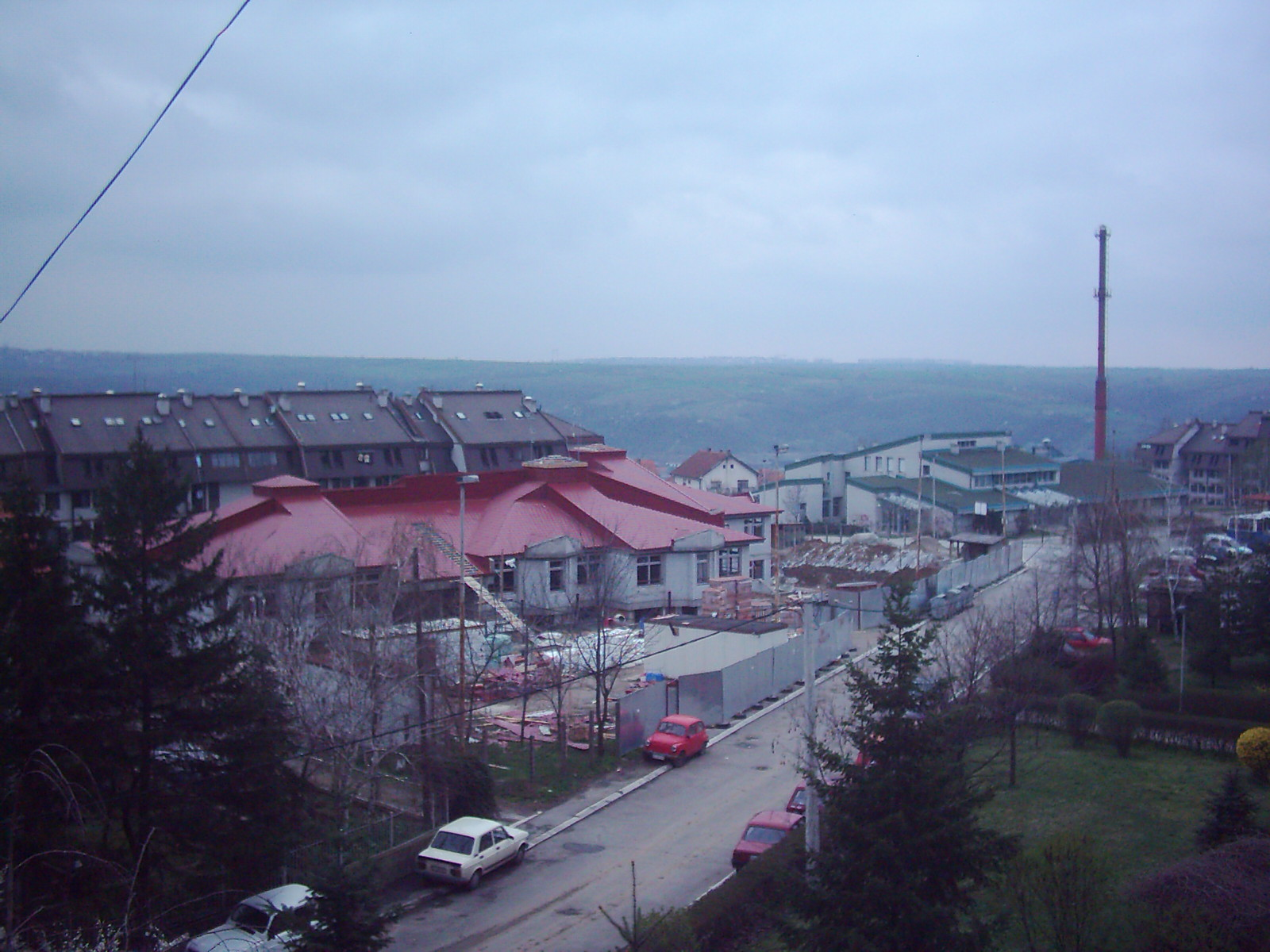
- Resnik

- Location within Belgrade
- Coordinates: 44°43′31″N 20°26′56″E
- Country: Serbia
- Region: Belgrade
- Municipality: Rakovica

Area
  - Total: 2.34 km^{2} (0.90 sq mi)

Population
  - Total: 18,370
  - Density: 7,850/km^{2} (20,300/sq mi)
- Time zone: UTC+1 (CET)
  - Summer (DST): UTC+2 (CEST)
- Area code: +381(0)11
- Car plates: BG

Resnik (Serbian: Ресник, pronounced [rɛ̂ːsnik]) is an urban neighborhood of Belgrade, Serbia. It is located in Belgrade's municipality of Rakovica.

== Location ==
Resnik is located in the southern section of the municipality and makes the southernmost point of the urban Belgrade City Proper. Originally a village distant from Belgrade, it developed between the valleys of the creek of Rakovički potok and the Topčiderka river. The creek of Pariguz flows through the southern parts of Resnik before it empties into the Topčiderka. The settlement is roughly triangularly shaped and bordered by the settlements of Sunčani Breg, Jelezovac, Straževica (north), Petlovo Brdo and Kijevo (north-west) which make Resnik's urban connection to the rest of Belgrade. The other three sides are still not urbanized (fields of Klik, Mandrine, Hladna Voda, Pašinac, etc.).

Kadinac creek flows into the Topčiderka west of the neighborhood. As it grows, Resnik almost makes a continuously built-up area with Rušanj on the south, and Pinosava on the south-east. As a large settlement, Resnik stretches over numerous geographic localities, like Ladne Vode, Arap-Čair, Gaj, Ciganske Njive, etc. Parts of Resnik are prone to downhill creep.

Resnik is the southernmost point of Belgrade's urban proper.

== History ==
According to the folk legend, the name comes from the catkins of formerly abundant walnut, and especially hazel trees, which are called rese in Serbian.

The village of Resnik was mentioned in Ottoman defter from 1528. This census of Belgrade nahiyah described the location of Resnik as suitable for living thanks to the fertile land, meadows, forests, water springs and geographic position. It had 17 houses in 1713 and 33 in 1718. The first school was opened in 1842. In 1870 it was seated in the house of the Stojanović family, later moving into the house of the Lazarević. Building of the present elementary school, "Kosta Abrašević", was built in the early 1970s.

In the 1865 Topography dictionairy by Alimpije Bogić, the official scribe of the Vračar srez described Resnik as a "village in Posavlje above the Rakovica monastery, three hours from Belgrade". Anthropogeographer Risto Nikolić wrote in the 19th century that "the oldest families are Jeličić and Ćalić (today named Petrović), then Zarkulović (who died out), followed by Aleksić (today Nedeljković), Paunović, Manojlović and Đurđević, then Rnjić (today Matić), Životić, etc".

Central gathering point during the Interbellum was "Agricultural, Consumers and Credit Cooperative". Non-agricultural economy employed many workers in the Kijevo quarry, while workers later began to work in the developing industry of Rakovica. Resnik became a station on the Belgrade-Niš railway in 1884, and with the extension to Mala Krsna in 1924, the settlement began to spread in the direction of the railways. Resnik's railway stations proved to be strategic in both world wars, as they were outside of the reach of the initial artillery attacks, so it was used by the military and especially for the transport of refugees.

Resnik was a separate village and had its own municipality from 1832 until the 1959/1960 administrative reform, when it became part of the Čukarica municipality. In 1972, it lost a separate settlement status and became part of the Belgrade urban proper. When municipality of Rakovica was reconstructed in 1974 from part of Čukarica, Resnik became part of it. It continued to be the seat of the local community, a sub-municipal administrative unit. By the 1981 census it was divided in two (Resnik and Avala Grad) and in 2010 two new local communities were created: Železnička Stanica Resnik and Sunčani Breg.

In 1942, in the Zelenjaka ravine, the occupational German forces executed over 100 people and kidnapped 29 Romanies which then disappeared. In 1944, almost all young males were sent to the Syrmian Front by the Partisans, the majority of whom were killed in action.

Until 1948, the train (ćira, the steam locomotive) was the only transportation connection with Belgrade. The first public bus transportation line to Belgrade was introduced in 1957. In this period the waterworks grid was built, and electricity was introduced. Cultural Center was opened in 1969. Football club "Pobeda" was founded in 1937, becoming FK Resnik in 1956.

When the neighboring Kijevo lost its separate settlement status in 1959, the majority of its area was attached to the village of Kneževac, but one small part became a cadastral part of Resnik.

On 4 January 1964 there was a rail accident in the Jajinci railway station, which is located in the northeastern section of Resnik, rather than in the neighborhood of Jajinci itself. A local passenger train hit the parked express train, killing 66 people.

Based on the existing nightlife in Resnik, which included kafanas like "Tasina Kafana", "Šumadinac", "Kod Mitra" and "Bosna i Srbija", shortened to "BIS", from the 1970s local entrepreneurs attempted to turn Resnik into the nightlife attraction. In the 1970s, a club "Resnik" was opened in the former adult movie theater which was closed by the authorities. In the 1980s, a club "Cvetni Breg" was also opened. Though initially gaining some prominence, (visitors like actors, diplomats, Belgrade's mayor Branko Pešić) the idea ultimately failed as the venues, being distant from downtown, weren't much attended.

== Characteristics ==
Historical population
Year	Pop.	±%
1910	1,605	—
1921	1,348	−16.0%
1931	1,795	+33.2%
1948	2,229	+24.2%
1953	2,786	+25.0%
1961	4,947	+77.6%
1971	7,600	+53.6%
1981	13,824	+81.9%
1991	12,840	−7.1%
2002	16,304	+27.0%
2011	18,370	+12.7%

By the 2011 census, total population of Resnik was 18,370. Of that, the local community of Resnik had 5,152 inhabitants, Avala Grad 6,833, Železnička Stanica-Resnik 3,367, and Sunčani Breg 3,018.

Resnik is predominantly a residential settlement. It is close to important traffic routes: the valley of Rakovički potok is a route to the Kružni put, suburban road of Belgrade and the future part of the projected Belgrade beltway, and a Belgrade-Požarevac railway, while the valley of Topčiderka is a route to the Belgrade-Niš railway. Resnik has railway stations on both railways (northern one is officially styled Jajinci but it is far from that neighborhood). Tunnels are constructed on both road and railway passing through the northern section of Resnik.

The building industry develops along the Kružni put as a series of construction companies, cement plants and a building material's depots are located there. An open green market (kvantaš) is also located on the road.

Rakovica monastery is officially on the Resnik's territory, both in terms of cadastre, and local community (now Sunčani breg). Until 1935, monks performed parochial duties in Resnik, when the first village priest, Sibin Stanković, moved in. Resnik got its own church only after the foundations of the Church of the Saint Vladika Nikolaj Žički were consecrated by Irinej, the Patriarch of the Serbian Orthodox Church in 2012 in Avala Grad. Though it had no church, Resnik had a church bell which was located in the adapted bellfry in the school and served as a school bell. After 1953, the Communist authorities removed it, and the bell was subsequently stolen and sold for scrap. The villagers retrieved it and hanged it on the plum tree at cemetery. It functioned as the church bell before it was removed again.

The artificial lake Pariguz is a well-known attraction in the area. It was made in 1989/90 and named after the nearby creek. It is a popular summer destination for many inhabitants of Resnik and for Belgraders who have weekend-houses in the area, even though the water was never tested and the banks are not arranged. Lake Pariguz was the proposed site of the 3rd European Peoples Global Action held in 2004, before it was moved to Jajinci.

There is a memorial drinking fountain, built to commemorate denizens of Resnik who were killed in the Balkan Wars and the First World War. Around a hundred names were carved in the memorial plaque, but the plaque and the fountain deteriorated a lot by the 2020s.

Miloš Nedeljković directed a documentary on Resnik, Resnik za sva vremena ("Resnik for eternity"), in 2023. Poet Miroslav Kokošar authored a poem about Resnik's main drinking fountain, the Old Fountain, which served as the focal social point in Resnik. Painter and arts professor Milorad Janković often painted Resnik, his hometown. Poet Danica Marković worked in Resnik and was often visited by her friend, painter Nadežda Petrović. One of Petrović's best known works is a 1904 painting "Road to Resnik".

== Sub-neighborhoods ==
=== Avala Grad ===
Urban settlement built in the period from the 1970s to the 1990s. The local community had a population of 6,998 in 1991, 8,084 in 2002, and 6,833 in 2011.

=== Patin Majdan ===
South-eastern extension of the neighborhood, in the direction of Pinosava. It is located on the Topčiderka river and is prone to flash floods during heavy rains.

=== Sunčani Breg ===
Formerly the northernmost extension of Resnik, across the railway, in the Miljakovac direction. Split into a separate local community in 2010, with a population of 3,018.

== Transport ==
Resnik has its own railway station. Resnik railway station was located on the, now defunct, regional express network of BG Voz. On 13 April 2018, it became part of BG Voz, Belgrade's urban rail system, which connected Resnik with the Belgrade Centre railway station in Prokop. The projected commuting time, via Kijevo, Kneževac, Rakovica, Košutnjak and Topčider (the train will not stop at the last two stations), is calculated at only 18 minutes.

Neighbourhood is served by five bus lines from GSP Belgrade; 47 (Slavija - Resnik), 94 (New Belgrade - Resnik), 503 (Voždovac - Resnik), 504 (Vidikovac - Resnik) and 506 (Patin majdan - Resnik), also a line passing through the settlement is 507 (Kneževac - Rušanj)

== Future ==
In September 2007 an official motion was started by the municipality of Voždovac to create a new sub-Avalan municipality (Avalski Venac), which would include the settlements of Ripanj, Beli Potok, Pinosava and Zuce from Voždovac, Vrčin from the municipality of Grocka and Resnik. It was supported by the local Voždovac administration headed by the Democratic Party at the time, but not by the members of the same party on the city level. It was also proposed by the political party G17 Plus in 2010 and Nova Stranka in 2015, but with Resnik remaining in Rakovica.

== Gallery ==
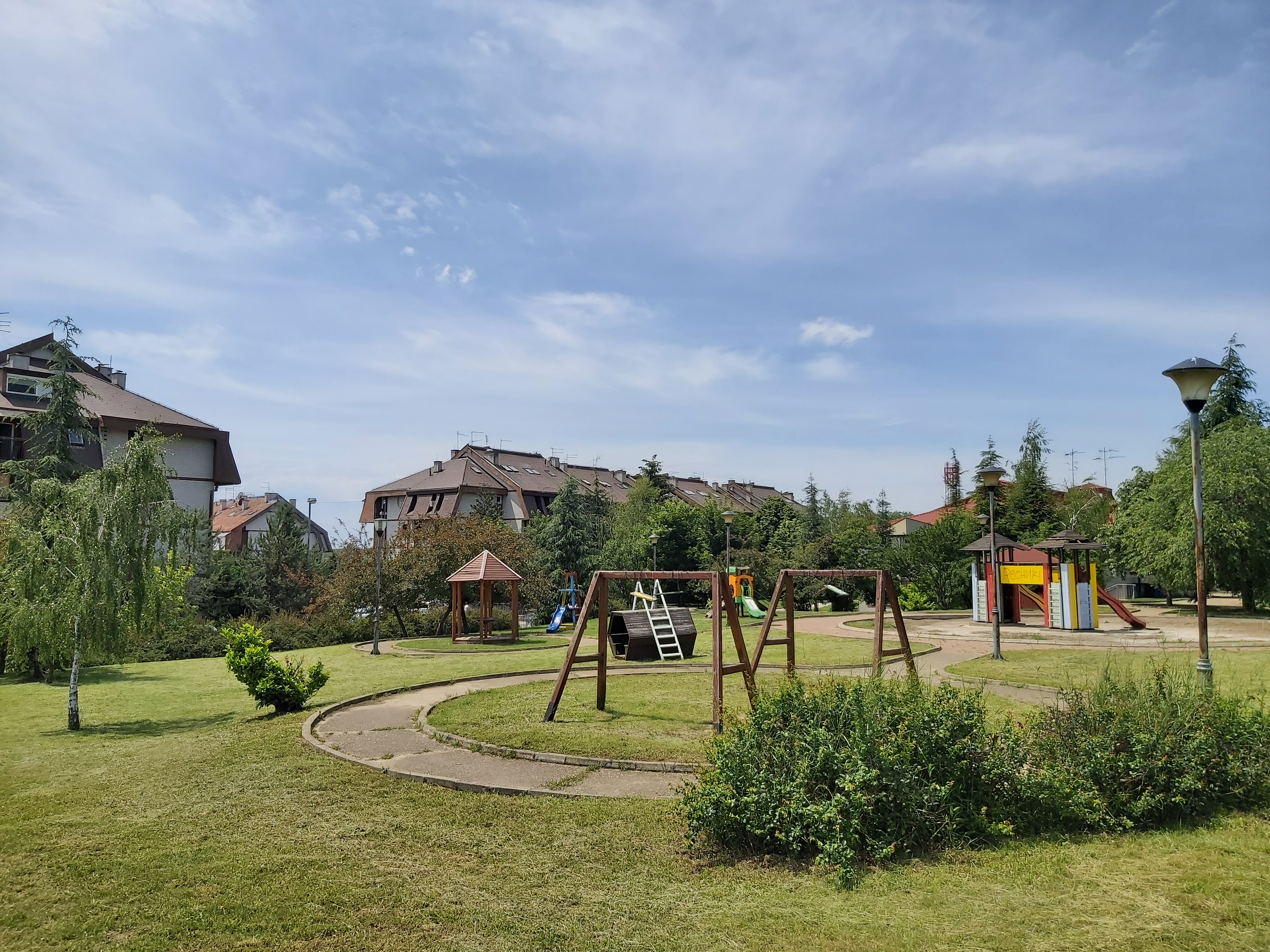
Avala Grad

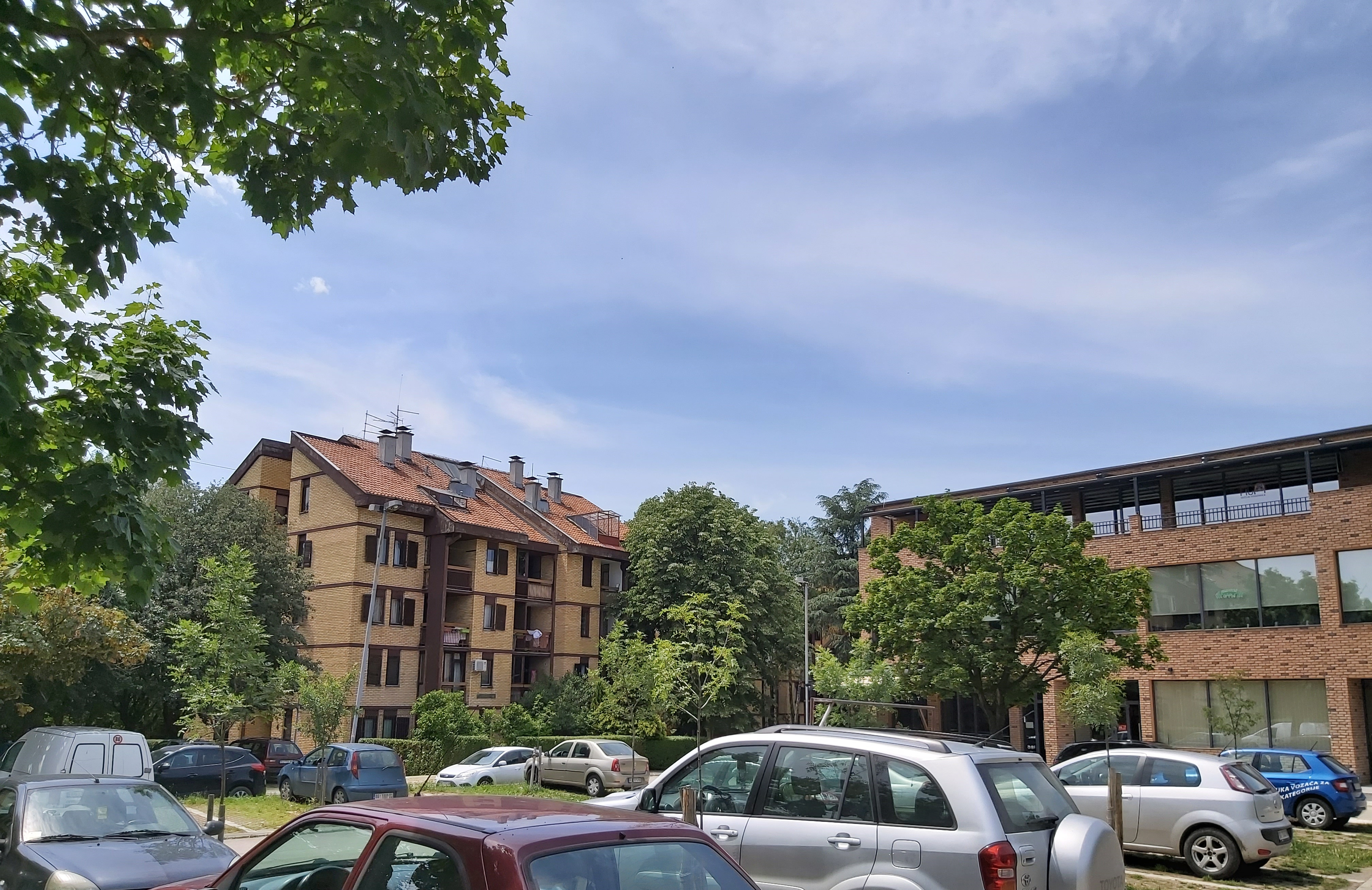
Avala Grad

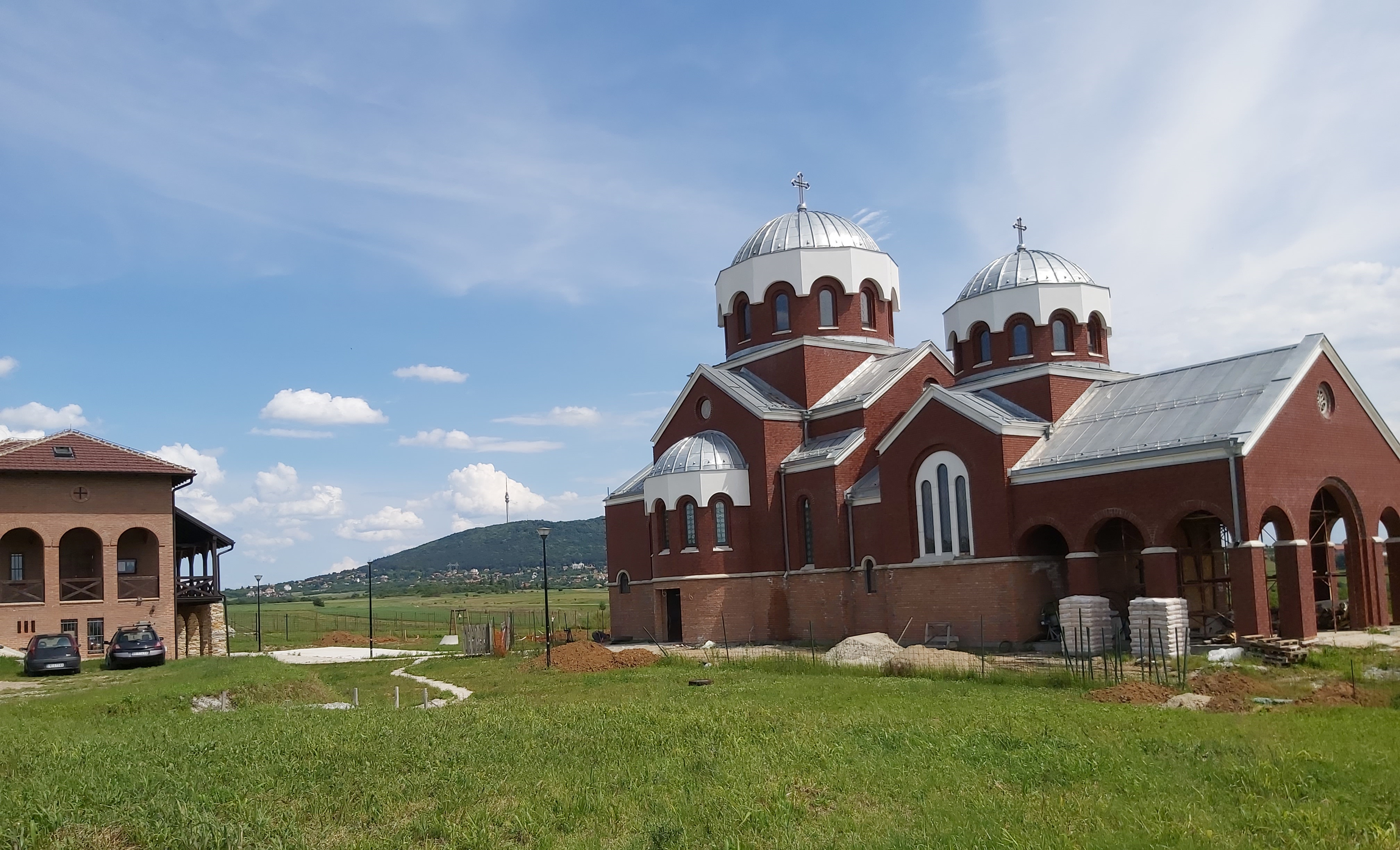
Church of Saint Nikolaj of Serbia

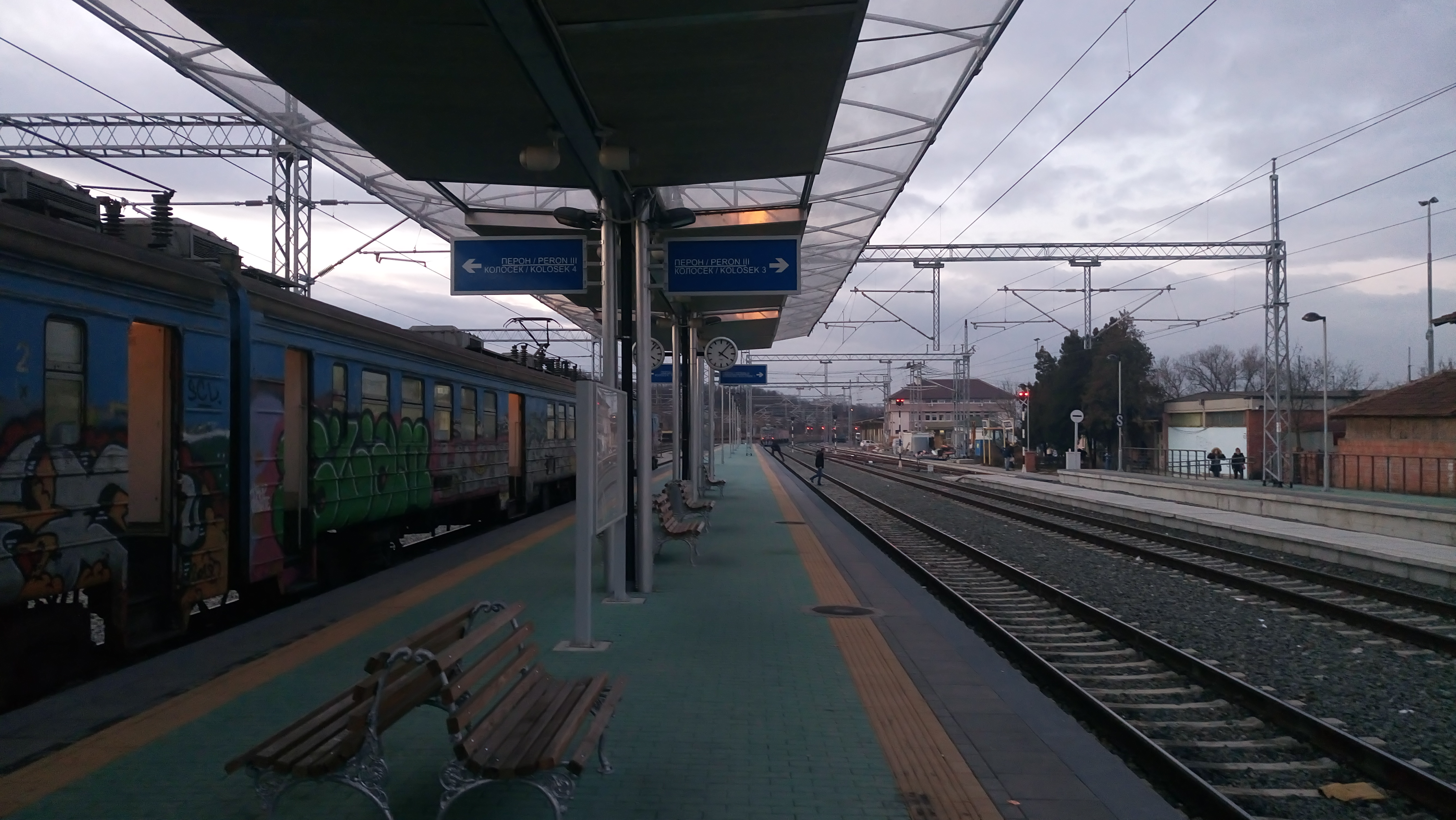
Resnik railway station
