= Orlovača =

Coordinates: 44°42′34″N 20°24′29″E

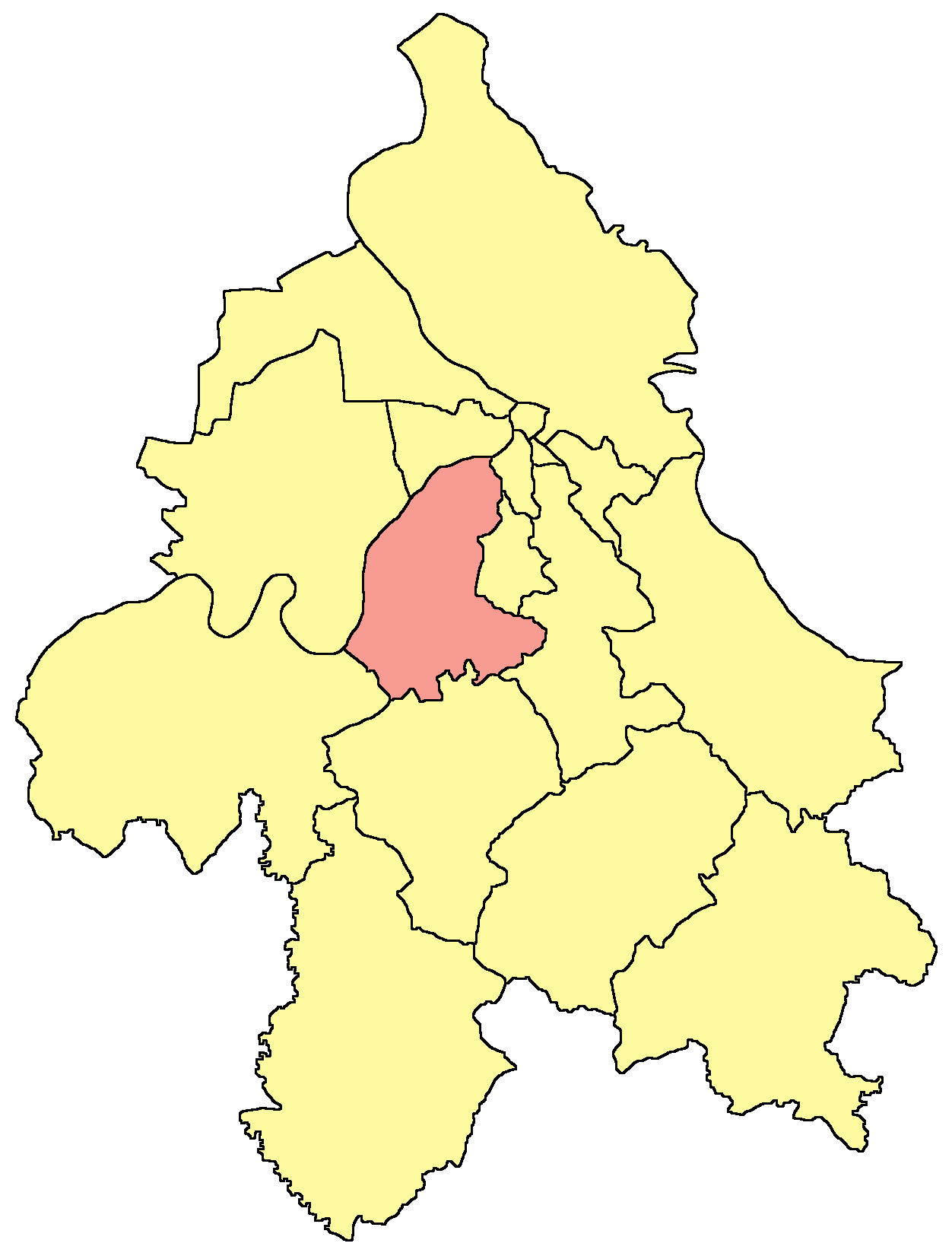
Belgrade municipality map

Orlovača (Serbian Cyrillic: Орловача) is one of major cemeteries in Belgrade, the capital of Serbia. It is located in the Belgrade's municipality of Čukarica.

== Location ==
Orlovača cemetery is located in the eastern part of the Orlovača field, on the southern tip of the Belgrade's urban proper, alongside the Ibar highway, on the border of Čukarica and Rakovica municipalities. It is bounded by the creeks of Krušik on the south and Krušički Potok on the north, while the valley of the Kijevski Potok is to the east. It is situated between the neighborhoods of Železnik (northwest) and Petlovo Brdo (northeast).

The field itself stretches to Železnik and is bordered by the Rnjakovac Creek on the south. It is bounded by the fields of Mastirine on the north, Logorište on the southwest, Drenjak on the south and Prekoplandište on the southeast. Just north of the cemetery are the railway and a crossroad of the Ibar Highway and Kružni Put, semi-circular road connecting the entire southern edge of Belgrade. Parallel to Kružni Put, a southern section of the new Belgrade bypass is being built.

== History ==
In Interbellum, during the period of Kingdom of Yugoslavia, the local land was parceled and awarded by the royal Karađorđević dynasty to the recipients of the Order of the White Eagle. As the Serbian word for eagle is orao, the area became known as Orlovat. After 1945, new Communist authorities nationalized the land and the name in time morphed into Orlovača.

Detailed plan for the future cemetery was finished in 1985. Head of the architectural team was Mirjana Lukić and the design was done by the Institute for Urbanism. It included ideas for all parts of the cemetery, except for the future church. Construction began in 1988 and the cemetery became operational in 1991. The latest architectural works were done in 2008 when the dome was built over the main building. The main building is designed in the shape of a flower and was built on top of the chapels. The 10 m (33 ft)-diameter dome is made of glass, which allows for natural light to shines through.

Original chapels were located in a temporary, adapted object which wasn't suited for the purpose. In 1998 Serbian Orthodox Church asked for a proper church and chapels to be built. Patriarch Pavle consecrated the location of the future church on 2 June 1998. Construction of the Church of the Hieromartyr Procopius began in January 1999 and was finished and consecrated in 2001. It was designed by architect Ljubica Bošnjak, frescoes are work of Mićo Beloćević, while iconostasis was painted by a group of artists from Herzegovina.

== Characteristics ==
The cemetery is accessible by the public transportation lines, buses number 531, 532 (weekends only) and 533 (all week days). Ibar Highway, which passes next to Orlovača, is notorious for car accidents in this section. To prevent this from happening, a construction of new interchange began in March 2008. It will make a better access to Orlovača and increase the traffic on Ibar Highway as a present traffic light will be removed when interchange is finished. It will also provide an access to the future auto-base "Vrbin Potok" which is to be built in Orlovača, too.
