= Kijevo, Belgrade =

Kijevo Кијево
- neighborhood of Belgrade
- Location within Serbia
- Coordinates: 44°42′56″N 20°25′46″E
- Country: Serbia

Population (2011)
  - Total: 5,285
- Time zone: UTC+1 (CET)
  - Summer (DST): UTC+2 (CEST)

Kijevo (Serbian: Кијево) is an urban neighborhood of Belgrade, the capital of Serbia. It is located in Belgrade's municipality of Rakovica.

== Location ==
Kijevo is located between the southwestern slopes of the 209-metre-high (686 ft) Straževica hill on the east, and the southeastern slopes of the 205-metre-high (673 ft) Petlovo Brdo on the west. The neighborhood is situated in the central part of the municipality, on the mouth of the stream of Kijevski Potok into the Topčiderka river. It is bordered by the neighborhoods of Petlovo Brdo on the west, Labudovo Brdo and Kneževac on the north and Resnik on the southeast. The neighborhood Sunčani Breg is located east of the Straževica hill and the quarry. Area south of Kijevo, the "Klik"' and "Šabinac" meadows, is still not urbanized.

The neighborhood is situated in the valley of the Topčiderka, 14 km (8.7 mi) south of downtown Belgrade, near the crossroad of the Ibar highway and the Kružni put, and the future, parallel, Belgrade beltway.

== Geography ==
Originally, the area was suitable for tourism and was well known as an excursion location. The flowery meadows surrounded both the Kijevski Potok and Topčiderka, which in turn were bordered by the oak forests and agricultural fields. Later, the artificial Lake Kijevo was formed in the valley. However, by the 1960s all that disappeared. The settlement became more populous, the highway and the tunnel were built and the area was fully urbanized. The lake was drained, the forests were cut and the meadows and fields transformed in time into the marshland.

The Straževica slopes are made of rich deposits of sandy-detrital silicified limestone, which are even today exploited in the Kijevo Quarry, which was originally open to supply the railroad company, but also became the main stone source for Belgrade.

=== Lake Kijevo ===
Lake Kijevo is a former artificial lake which existed for 46 years. Kijevski Potok, which originates under the hillock of Mačkov kamen, between Kneževac and Rušanj, cut through the Kijevo valley and often flooded it. In order to prevent damage by floodings to his factory, Stefanović built a sluice in 1901, forming the Lake Kijevo. Soon, the lake, surrounded by the thick forest, became an excursion site for the wealthier Belgraders. As Kijevo has its own railway station, a special excursion trains connected it to downtown Belgrade. There was an ada, small island in the lake which visitors could reached only by boats. Custom of the day was for the ladies to be brought to the island by boat and then to have a Turkish coffee served there. As the lake became more and more popular, Stefanović built a hotel with the ballroom. Visitors included Serbian king Peter I, writer Branislav Nušić and painter Nadežda Petrović. It has been recorded that the lake was visited by Albert Einstein, his wife Mileva and their son Hans. During his 1905 visit to the botanist Nedeljko Košanin, chief of the Belgrade's botanical garden Jevremovac, the Einsteins were driving the boat and swam in the lake.

In 1937-38 Stefanović's nephew, who inherited the business, parceled the remaining land into lots with the view on ada and sold them for the construction of the family houses. After the unusually rainy spring in 1941, the sluice gate was lifted for the sludge to be washed away. The gates were later stolen and the lake began to recede. New authorities tried to clean an dredge the bottom of the valley, but ultimately gave up and the lake completely drained through the Kijevski Potok into the Topčiderka by 1947. New government, aside from confiscating all their assets, declared the Stefanović's nephew and his brother public enemies. Immediately after the war, one of the brothers fell under the train in dubious circumstances (he was in the company of the representatives of the new government) and the other emigrated to the United States.

When the construction of the neighborhood of Kanarevo Brdo began in the 1960s, the earth which was dug was used to fill the former lake. The area was then flattened and turned into the football court for the local club "FK Kijevo". The club was disbanded in 2000, and the court was left unattended. By 2015 it was completely overgrown by the vegetation and the football facilities deteriorated, while the stream became an open sewage canal. The only remaining property of the Stefanović family economic complex is one low, abandoned building full of rubbish, at the edge of the former court.

== History ==
=== Origin ===
Until the early 20th century, Kijevo was an uninhabited section of the Rakovica's rural area. Svetozar Stefanović, industrialist who founded the first canning factory in Serbia, in Kragujevac, moved to Belgrade and bought the land at the mouth of the Kijevski Potok into the Topčiderka and planted fruits and vegetables, including the large fruit plantation on the slopes of the west bank of Kijevski Potok. Later, in 1901 he also transferred his factory from Kragujevac to Kijevo. The factory was nationalized after the World War II by the new Communist authorities, renamed to "Prvi Maj" and moved to Čukarica in the late 1950s. The factory was predecessor of the modern canning factory FMP.

After the Lake Kijevo was created in 1901, lots around the lake were settled by the wealthy Belgrade citizens who build villas around the lake. Among the first was Moša Avram "Maca", proprietor of the first umbrella factory in Belgrade. His villa was later adapted into the first Kijevo elementary school and after the World War II became the seat of local branch of OZNA (Yugoslav security agency) for a while. The building was demolished in the 1960s.

Apart from Stefanović, fast industrial development of Kijevo included the entrepreneurs Parapid, Tomić and Marković who founded the quarry, while a major landowner of the time, Fotelić, owned a large land complex on the southern and southeastern slopes of Petlovo Brdo. There were numerous smaller landowners, mostly peasant families from Kneževac, but also from Resnik and nearby Rušanj. As the peasants in time became highly in debt, especially during the Great Depression, the land in Kijevo was acquired by the Mortgage bank in 1931–1932. The confiscated land on the eastern and southern slopes of Petlovo Brdo, in the alluvial valleys of both rivers, was parceled and sold to the employees of the railroad company. This is when Kijevo began to fully develop as a settlement.

=== After World War II ===
Until 1941, some 200 people settled in Kijevo, with additional 80 who refuged during the World War II. After the war, a huge number of rural population moved to Belgrade, especially from the war thorn and poor regions, but also because of the deficit of the workforce in the city. Many worked in Kijevo because of the railroad and tunnel construction, so the temporary barracks for the workers and their families were placed all over the Belgrade suburbia, including Kijevo. Some of them still stand. The 1950 Belgrade general plan (GUP) envisioned the entire area stretching from the Zmajevac Hill, below Miljakovac, over Kneževac, to Kijevo, as the green, un-urbanized, excursion area.

Next wave of settlement in Kijevo began in 1953, coinciding with the massive shift of the local agricultural population which was settling in Belgrade. As Kijevo was at the time designated as the green area, and the building was restricted, the unplanned construction flourished. As there was a major shortage of apartments in the city, the settlers were buying the lots in Kijevo and built their own houses. In 1953-1960 period, 800 people moved into the settlement.

Next phase of the development started in 1962, this time under the administration of the Čukarica municipality to which Kijevo belonged at the time after being abolished as a separate settlement in 1959 and annexed to the village of Kneževac, which in turn lost its municipality and became part of Čukarica. As the municipality issued the building permits, the settlement spread from the originally drier sections of the lower and eastern slopes. The individual houses were now built, almost on top of Petlovo Brdo and on the left slopes of the Duboki Potok. In 1961-1965 period, 700 new inhabitants settled in Kijevo.

=== Modern development ===
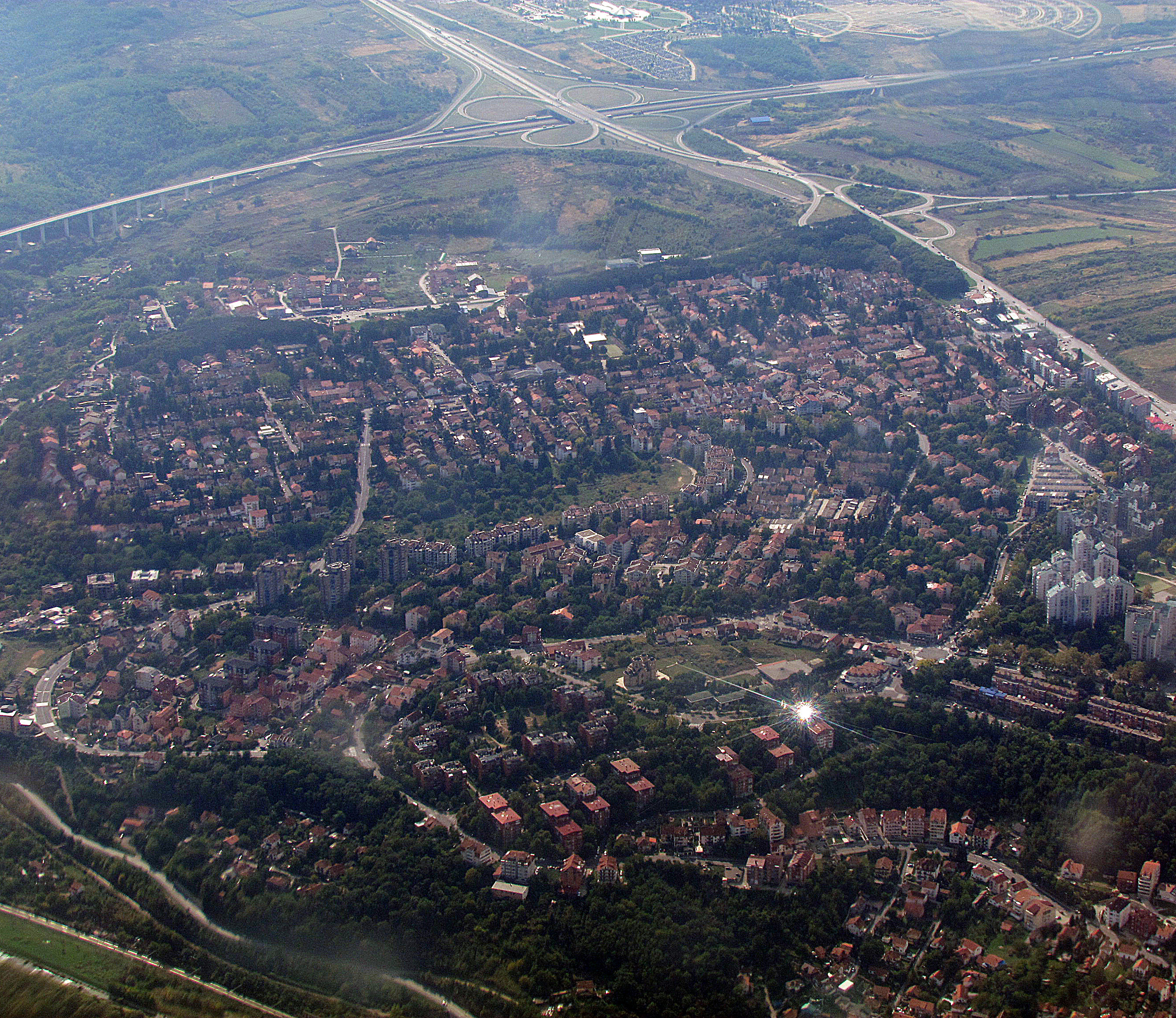
Petlovo Brdo, developed as the new section of Kijevo, today is a separate local community

In 1965 the municipality handed over the area to the development agency, and the planned growths began. This marked the end of the individual construction and the building of the high rise began. In the 1966-1969 period, 2,500 people settled in Kijevo. Such a strong and fast development, despite being planned, had its setbacks, especially concerning the lack of compatibility with the rational building of the settlement which raised the price of both the construction and the communal grid. The construction continued without fixing the problems but the new settlement was partially harmonized with the 1972 GUP of Belgrade. This new GUP abandoned the 1950 GUP project of green areas on this location, switching to urban construction instead.

The GUP envisioned the urban joining of Kneževac-Kijevo and Železnik, along the Kružni put road, creating a secondary center of Belgrade. The planned suburban city was to have 35,000 workers and 100,000 inhabitants, on an area of 150 ha (370 acres). The city was to have numerous business buildings, department stores, hotels, educational facilities, scientific venues and medical institutes. The project wasn't carried through and the two neighborhoods remained disconnected, though they both independently formed one urban unit with Belgrade in time and in 1972 were abolished as separate settlements and annexed to Belgrade as its neighborhoods.

In 1970–1971, 4,500 people moved into the Kneževac-Kijevo neighborhood. According to the 1971 census, Kneževac, still a separate settlement, had a population of 13,022, but 8,823 belonged to the Kijevo-Petlovo Brdo section, making Kijevo twice larger than Kneževac itself. Only 19% of the population was autochthonous. The migrations were almost stopped after that and the informal settlements were resettled, so already in 1972 a population began to decline. The population was resettled into the neighboring settlements and villages of Miljakovac, Resnik, Rušanj, Pelovo Brdo and Sremčica. By this time, the settlement was fully urbanized and not a single family was solely agricultural, though some small fields were still cultivated.

The stream remained unregulated for decades, still flooding the neighboring houses during heavy rains. Regulation of the 1,265 m (4,150 ft) long section, which was to prevent future flooding, began in 2020. Deadline was set to 2022 or 2023. It was decided to completely conduct the waterway into the underground pipes.

In time, the new section with high rise buildings differentiated itself as a separate neighborhood of Petlovo Brdo so today the name Kijevo applies only to the old part of the neighborhood.

== Administration ==
Historical population
Year	Pop.	±%
1971	8,823	—
1981	6,708	−24.0%
1991	7,728	+15.2%
2002	9,239	+19.6%
2011	5,285	−42.8%

Kijevo was a separate village until 1959 when it was incorporated into Kneževac, which in turn was incorporated into Belgrade in 1972.

Kijevo is today organized as "local community", a sub-municipal administrative unit. In 2010 the western section of the local community was detached and became part of the newly formed local community Petlovo Brdo.

== Characteristics ==
In the urban and cadastral sense, Kijevo forms one unit with the neighboring Kneževac. Majority of the area of the former Kijevo settlement is today part of the Kneževac cadaster municipality, with a small part being added to the Resnik cadaster municipality.

== Economy ==
A former village, through urbanization Kijevo became the southern extension of Rakovica and a mostly industrialized area. The most important feature in the neighborhood is the quarry which supplies the entire Belgrade's building industry with stone and slates. The remaining industry is also mostly into construction and building (building companies and cement plants Komgrap, Graditelj, etc.).

Kijevo is important traffic crossroad. Crossing of the Belgrade-Niš and suburban Belgrade's railway is located here, with several tunnels and "Kijevo" railway station. Kružni put or "circular road" which rounds through the entire southern outskirts of Belgrade passes here, also with a tunnel in Kijevo.
