= Vidikovac, Belgrade =

Vidikovac Видиковац
- Urban neighbourhood
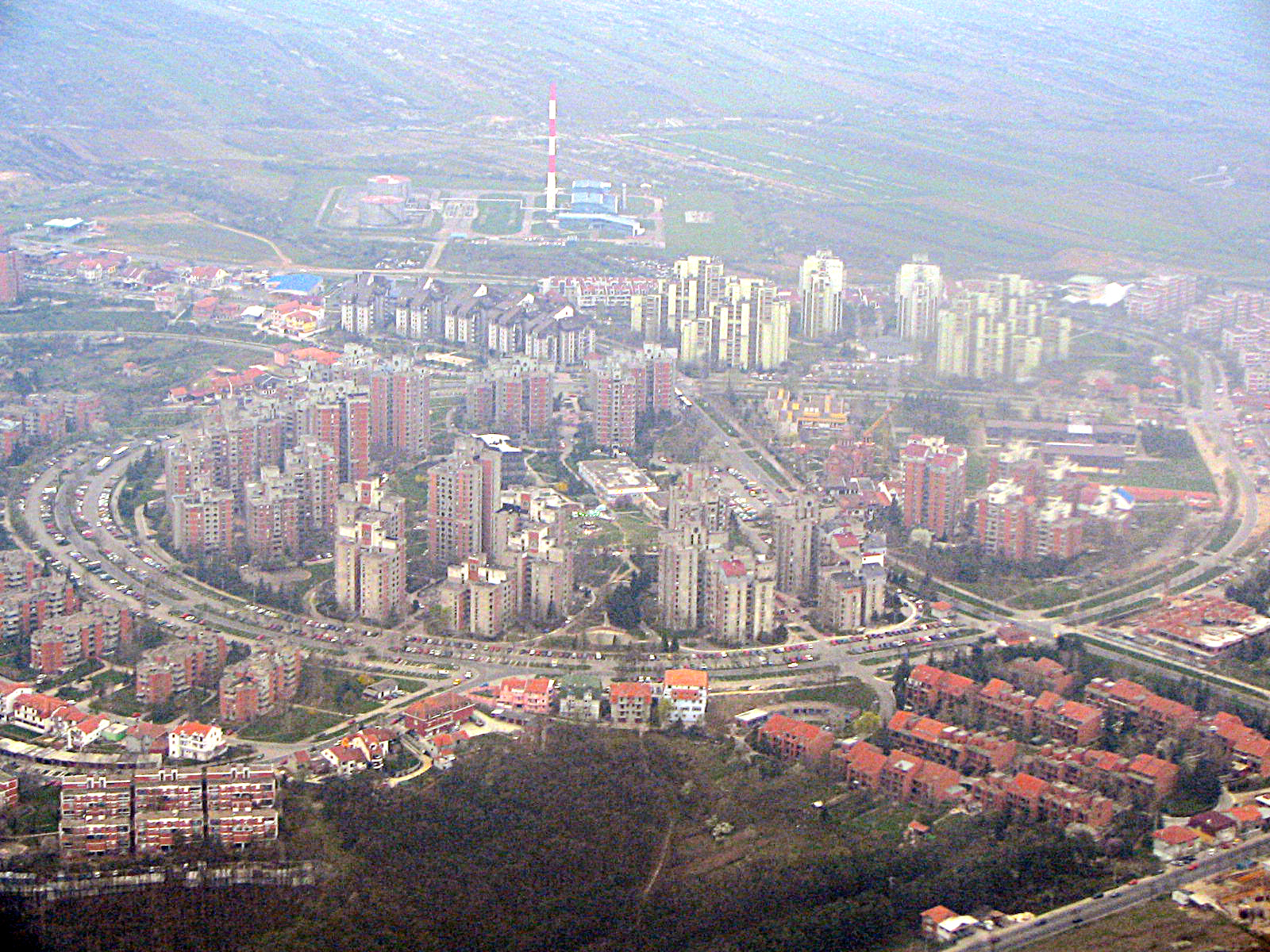
- Vidikovac

- Location within Belgrade
- Coordinates: 44°44′13″N 20°25′13″E
- Country: Serbia
- Region: Belgrade
- Municipality: Rakovica
- Time zone: UTC+1 (CET)
  - Summer (DST): UTC+2 (CEST)
- Area code: +381(0)11
- Car plates: BG

Vidikovac (Serbian Cyrillic: Видиковац) is an urban neighborhood of Belgrade, the capital of Serbia. It is located in Belgrade's municipality of Rakovica.

== Location ==
Vidikovac is located on the top of the hill of the same name, in the eastern part of the municipality on the border of the municipality of Čukarica, along the road of Ibarska magistrala. It is bordered by the neighbourhoods of Rakovica to the west, Kneževac to the south, Labudovo Brdo further to the south and Cerak Vinogradi to the north. To the west, across the Ibarska magistrala is mostly non-urbanized. There is a school named after author Branko Ćopić in Vidikovac.

== Characteristics ==
The name of the hill and neighborhood, Vidikovac, is Serbian for lookout, observation point. Vidikovac is projected as a series of skyscrapers (up to 24 floors) constructed in a small concentric circles within larger circles represented by circular streets. The main street curving around the neighborhood is Vidikovački venac ("Vidikovac wreath"), the Patrijarha Joanikija goes right through the middle of the neighborhood while Ibarska magistrala and Pilota Mihaila Petrovića street form the outer border of the neighborhood.

The area is residential with a highly developing commercial sector since the 1990s. There is a McDonald's restaurant in the neighborhood with the adjoining shopping mall, and opposite is the Ibarska magistrala, a heat plant used for local heating. The population of Vidikovac was 16,098 in 2002.

== Vidikovačka Padina ==
Vidikovačka Padina is the eastern and south-eastern extension of Vidikovac. It makes an urban connection of Vidikovac to the neighborhood of Rakovica (north) and Kneževac, across the Topčiderka river. It is located on the eastern slopes of the Vidikovac hill, hence the name of the neighborhood (Vidikovačka padina, "Vidikovac slope"). The main streets in the neighborhood are Kneževačka and Slavka Rodića. Despite the geographic name, the neighborhood is administratively part of the Kneževac local community.
