= Nataša Ljubišić =

Serbian politician

Nataša Ljubišić (Serbian Cyrillic: Наташа Љубишић; born 1990) is a Serbian politician. She has served in the National Assembly of Serbia since 2020 as a member of the Serbian Progressive Party.

== Early life and private career ==
Ljubišić was born in Belgrade, Serbia, in what was then the Socialist Federal Republic of Yugoslavia. She has a master's degree as an economist and lives in the Belgrade municipality of Rakovica.

== Politician ==
Ljubišić received the 180th position on the Progressive Party's Aleksandar Vučić — For Our Children electoral list in the 2020 Serbian parliamentary election and was elected to the national assembly when the list won a landslide majority with 188 out of 250 mandates. She is a member of the assembly committee on the economy, regional development, trade, tourism, and energy; a deputy member of the committee on defence and internal affairs and the committee for the diaspora and Serbs in the region; the leader of Serbia's parliamentary friendship group with Vietnam; and a member of the parliamentary friendship groups with Austria, Bosnia and Herzegovina, Croatia, the Czech Republic, Greece, Hungary, Israel, Italy, Montenegro, Poland, Slovakia, Switzerland, the United Arab Emirates, and the United States of America.
