= Stari košutnjak =

Stari košutnjak Стари Кошутњак
- Urban neighbourhood
- Location within Belgrade
- Coordinates: 44°45′24″N 20°27′05″E
- Country: Serbia
- Region: Belgrade
- Municipality: Rakovica
- Time zone: UTC+1 (CET)
  - Summer (DST): UTC+2 (CEST)
- Area code: +381(0)11
- Car plates: BG

Stari Košutnjak (Serbian Cyrillic: Стари Кошутњак) is a neighborhood located in Rakovica, municipality of the city of Belgrade. It is bordered by the neighborhoods of Rakovica municipality Kanarevo brdo and Miljakovac, and municipalities of Čukarica, Savski venac and Voždovac.

== History ==
The neighborhood's original name was the Railway colony (Serbian: Železnička kolonija). At the beginning of the 1920s, the Ministry of Railroad started building a neighborhood for their workers. Even today, the neighborhood is filled with old trains and their parts, so its primary purpose still remains in a way.

== Geography ==
It is located in the southern part of the municipality, at its border with the municipality Savski venac. Around the neighborhood, there are 4 forests: Košutnjak, White Palace forest, Banjica forest, and Miljakovac forest. River Topčiderka flows through the whole neighborhood. It is 8 kilometers from the center of Belgrade (~5 miles). Close to this neighborhood is the park Topčider and a forest with a similar name – Košutnjak. And in its very close vicinity is also the luxurious neighborhood Dedinje, which connects the neighborhood to Slavija, a part of Belgrade's center with the most traffic.
