= Milosav Miličković =

Serbian politician

Milosav Miličković (Serbian Cyrillic: Милосав Миличковић; born 4 June 1959) is a politician and administrator in Serbia. At different times, he has been a member of the Assembly of Serbia and Montenegro, the National Assembly of Serbia, and the City Assembly of Belgrade, as well as serving as mayor of the Belgrade municipality of Rakovica. Previously a member of the far-right Serbian Radical Party, he joined the Serbian Progressive Party on its formation in 2008.

== Early life and career ==
Miličković's former online biography from the Serbian ministry of internal affairs indicated that he is a graduate of the University of Belgrade's faculty of mechanical engineering and has obtained the title Master of Industrial Management from the faculty "Union" in Belgrade. He is an active athlete and is a black belt in karate.

== Politician ==
=== Radical Party ===
==== Before 2000 ====
Miličković appeared in the twenty-second position on the Radical Party's electoral list for Belgrade in the 1993 Serbian parliamentary election. The party won seven seats in the capital, and he was not included in its assembly delegation. (From 1992 to 2000, one-third of Serbia's parliamentary mandates were assigned to candidates from successful lists in numerical order, while the remaining two-thirds were distributed amongst other candidates at the discretion of the sponsoring parties and coalitions. Miličković could have been awarded a mandate despite his low position on the list.)

He was elected to the City Assembly of Belgrade in the 1996 Serbian local elections.

==== From 2000 to 2008 ====
The 2000 Yugoslavian general election was a watershed moment in Serbian and Yugoslavian politics, resulting in the defeat of Yugoslavian president Slobodan Milošević and the Socialist Party of Serbia, which had dominated politics in the country for the last decade. Miličković was a candidate for the Chamber of Citizens in the Yugoslavian parliament in this election, appearing in the first position on the Radical Party's list in Čukarica. He was not successful; the list did not win any seats in the division. He was also defeated in his bid for re-election to the Belgrade city assembly and for election to the Rakovica municipal assembly in the concurrent 2000 Serbian local elections.

Following Milošević's defeat, a new election was held for the Serbian national assembly in December 2000. For this election, the entire country was counted as a single electoral division and all mandates were awarded to candidates on successful lists at the discretion of the sponsoring parties and coalitions, irrespective of numerical order. Miličković appeared in the fifty-fifth position on the Radical list, which won twenty-three mandates. He was again not included in his party's delegation.

He once again appeared in the fifty-fifth position on the Radical Party's list in 2003 Serbian parliamentary election. On this occasion, the party won eighty-two mandates to become the largest group in the assembly (although it fell well short of a majority and ultimately served in opposition). Milićković was selected for a mandate when the assembly met in January 2004. His term in the republican parliament was brief: on 12 February, he was appointed as a member of the Radical Party's delegation to the federal assembly of Serbia and Montenegro. He served in the latter role until 2006, when the assembly ceased to exist after Montenegro declared independence.

Miličković appeared in the forty-first position on the Radical list for the 2007 Serbian parliamentary election and was given a mandate for a second term when the list won eighty-one seats. An unstable coalition government was formed by the Democratic Party (Demokratska stranka, DS) and the rival Democratic Party of Serbia (Demokratska stranka Srbije, DSS) after the election, and the Radicals continued to serve in opposition.

The DS–DSS coalition collapsed in early 2008, and another election was called for May of that year. Miličković once again appeared on the Radical list; the party won seventy-eight seats, and on this occasion he was not selected for its delegation. He also appeared in the second position on the Radical Party's list for the Rakovica municipal assembly in the concurrent 2008 Serbian local elections and took a mandate when the list won twenty-five out of seventy seats, finishing a close second against the For a European Serbia coalition led by the Democratic Party. The Radicals served in opposition at the municipal level following the election.

=== Progressive Party ===
The Radical Party experienced a serious split in late 2008, with several members joining the more moderate Serbian Progressive Party under the leadership of Tomislav Nikolić and Aleksandar Vučić. Miličković sided with the Progressives.

Serbia's electoral system was reformed in 2011, such that parliamentary mandates were awarded in numerical order to candidates on successful lists. Miličković appeared in the thirty-first position on the Progressive Party's Let's Get Serbia Moving coalition list and was elected to a third term when the list won seventy-three mandates. In the concurrent 2012 Serbian local elections, he led the Progressive Party's coalition to a narrow victory over the Democratic Party's coalition in Rakovica. Neither group was able to command a majority in the municipal assembly, and ultimately a grand coalition government was formed consisting of the Progressives, the Democratic Party, the Socialists, and their respective allies. Miličković was chosen as mayor; as he could not hold a dual mandate as a mayor and parliamentarian, he resigned his seat in the national assembly on 14 September 2012. He served as mayor until May 2014, when he was appointed as a secretary of state in the Serbian ministry of internal affairs.

While continuing to serve as a secretary of state, Miličković again appeared in the first position on the Progressive Party's list for Rakovica in the 2016 Serbian local elections and was re-elected when the list won twenty-five of fifty mandates. He did not return to the office of mayor but instead served as an assembly member for the next three years, until resigning on 21 March 2019. In the 2020 Serbian local elections, he led the Progressive list in Rakovica to a majority victory with thirty-four seats. He again took a seat in the assembly, although as of June 2021 he is no longer a member. Online sources do not indicate when he resigned.

Miličković was known prior to 2021 as an ally of Nebojša Stefanović and has to some degree shared in the latter's political downfall. In May 2021, he was replaced as Progressive Party commissioner for Rakovica and Mladenovac. It was noted in May 2021 that he had not, as yet, been removed from his position as a secretary of state in the Serbian government. His current position in the role is unclear, however; the ministry's website does not list any secretaries of state as of 31 July 2021.

== Electoral record ==
=== Local (City Assembly of Belgrade) ===
2000 City of Belgrade election Rakovica Division VII
Miroslav Draganić	Democratic Opposition of Serbia	Elected
Momčilo Jokanović	Socialist Party of Serbia–Yugoslav Left	
Milosav Miličković	Serbian Radical Party	
Slavica Pribaković	Serbian Renewal Movement	
