= Pariguz =

Lake in Belgrade, Serbia

- Location within Serbia
- Location: Belgrade, Serbia
- Coordinates: 44.705918°N 20.46255°E
- Type: artificial
- Primary inflows: Pariguz stream
- Primary outflows: Pariguz stream
- Basin countries: Serbia
- Max. length: 600 m (2,000 ft)
- Max. width: 120 m (390 ft)
- Surface area: 7.2 ha (18 acres)
- Average depth: 5 m (16 ft)
- Max. depth: 18 m (59 ft)
- Islands: none
- Settlements: Belgrade

Pariguz (Serbian: Паригуз) is an artificial lake in Resnik, an urban neighborhood of Belgrade, Serbia. It is located in the municipality of Rakovica. It is also called Lake Resnik.

== Location ==
The lake is located southeast of the center of Resnik, 17 km (11 mi) from downtown Belgrade, 6 km (3.7 mi) from the European route E70 and 1 km (0.62 mi) from the Belgrade bypass.

== Geography ==
Pariguz is created in the valley of the stream of the same name. It also receives waters from the seven springs, with another spring flowing from the surrounding forest. The lake covers and area of 72,000 m^{2} (780,000 sq ft), it is 600 m (2,000 ft) long, 120 m (390 ft) wide and up to 18 m (59 ft), deep, while the average depth is 5 m (16 ft). The water is cooler than the water in Ada Ciganlija and does not warm up higher than 20 °C (68 °F). Pariguz stream empties into the Topčiderska reka, which makes the lake part of the Black Sea drainage basin.

== Name ==
The name of the stream and the lake is unusual, and in modern Serbian the meaning would be the „buttock steamer“. Origin of the name is not known for sure. There are two concurring stories, both of which are generally considered as the cases of the folk etymology. One says that, during the First Serbian Uprising in the beginning of the 19th century, a company of Serbs attacked a group of Turkish soldiers nearby and, as the Serbian saying goes, Serbs „dusted buttocks“ of the Turks with the bullets. The other says that the bottom of the valley of the Pariguz stream was covered with healing mud, which even the ancient Romans used for treating the hemorrhoids.

In the official documentation of the project which envisioned the arrangement of the lake from 2020, the name Lake Resnik was used instead of Pariguz.

== History ==
The lake was created in 1989, when the stream was dammed to prevent the floods in the drainage bassin of the Topčiderska reka. A proper road to the lake was built in the spring of 2010. In 1999, during the NATO bombing of Serbia, the lake was drained, its bed was cleaned, and then refilled. Unconfirmed stories claimed that the reason was an unexploded NATO bomb which fell into the lake.

== Wildlife ==
Lake is inhabited by the mallards, partridges and terrapins. Water is populated by the rich fish fauna, including wels catfish, common carp, Prussian carp, European chub, brown bullhead and northern pike.

== Future ==
For years there are plans for the construction of the tourist complex, which would become the „Ada Ciganlija“ of Rakovica. The complex would include beaches, sports terrains and restaurants. Before that, the lake needs to be cleaned again as the waste waters from the closest houses drain into the lake, even though the chemical analysis conducted in 2012 showed that the water can be used for swimming, though the quality is not great. Shores of the lake were cleaned in March 2016. Another problem is the ownership of the land around the lake. Municipality owns the land up to 20 m (66 ft) from the shore, and much wider area is needed for the complex. Plans also include bicycle paths which would connect Pariguz to the other tourist attractions of Belgrade: Košutnjak, Pionirski Grad, Avala, Topčider.

However, as of 2017 no work has been done on the lake. In August 2017 the idea of sports complex on the lake was revived as the project Jezero ("lake"). Additions to the previous plans include the hotel 9,000 m^{2} (97,000 sq ft), spa center, swimming pools, sports hall, etc., all on the area of 24 ha (59 acres) around the lake. It turned out that the major problem is caused by five high voltage overhead power lines (110 and 120 kV) which crisscross the area. It is forbidden to build anything beneath them, to spend time, to swim or to fish. The lake is popular among the fishermen and is expected to become a popular swimming location and this causes a huge problem, so the planners say that the swimming and fishing probably won't be strictly forbidden, but people will be advised not to do it. On the lots which are directly beneath the power lines, a protective green zones will be created, wider than 30 m (98 ft). On them, even the open sports fields will not be allowed. Another limitation in the planning is the major gas pipeline which traverses the area, too.

A new road will be built. It will reach the lake from the north, as the continuation of Resnik's Brestovačka street, and should spread above the future complex. It will end with the parking lot and the roundabout of the future public transportation bus line. Instead of the present, narrow road which reaches the lake from the west, a communal path will be constructed, with the sewage system below so that waste waters wouldn't flow into the lake anymore. The path will be used only by the police and ambulance. A bicycle path will encircle the lake, passing through the thick forest on the southern side of the lake. A pedestrian bridge will be constructed across the lake, too. Neither the timeline for the project, nor the investors, have been disclosed and the city assembly should decide on the project by the end of 2017.

Plans were adopted in 2018 and by the end of the year, the lake was mapped in detail in order for the purification program to be drafted. Preparatory works began in October 2019. New additions to the project include relocation of the overhead power lines. In April 2020 it was announced that the works on the first phase will last from May to July, when the pontoon was placed in the lake, and the parking lot was finished.
