= Kneževac, Belgrade =

Neighborhood in Serbia

Coordinates: 44°43′59″N 20°26′3″E

Κneževac (Serbian Cyrillic: Кнежевац) is an urban neighborhood of Belgrade, Serbia. It is located in Belgrade's municipality of Rakovica.

== Location ==
Κneževac is located in the central part of the municipality. It developed as a village on the northern slopes of the Straževica hill, between the mouth of the Zmajevac brook into the Rakovički potok and its own confluence into the Topčiderka river. It is bordered by the neighborhoods of Rakovica on the north, Vidikovac on the west and Labudovo Brdo and Kijevo on the south.

== History ==
Village mentioned in the historical records on the location of modern neighborhood was named Humska. Under the name Kneževac, it was mentioned for the first time in the Ottoman census from 1560 (465 years ago). Another historical locality which is today part of the neighborhood, and which was mentioned in the Ottoman records, is Ćupričin Potok.

== Characteristics ==
As a southern extension of Rakovica, it developed quickly after the World War II (population 784 in 1921, 12,947 in 1971), turning from a distant suburb into an urban neighborhood of Belgrade to which it is connected not just by the roads but also by the railway and a tram line (No. 3). However, modern neighborhood is administratively diminished, so the population of the local community of Kneževac in 2002 was only 3,407. The Rakovica monastery and the woods of Manastirska šuma are located nearby so as the Belgrade's major quarry, Kijevo, on Straževica. The vast underground military complex "Kneževac", heavily bombed during the 1999 NATO bombing of Serbia is colloquially better known as Straževica.

The nearby Kijevo lost its separate settlement status in 1959 and was annexed to Kneževac. In the urban and cadastral sense, two neighborhoods form one unit. The 1960s General Urban Plan of Belgrade envisioned the urban joining of Kneževac-Kijevo and Železnik, along the Kružni put road, creating a secondary center of Belgrade. The planned suburban city was to have 35,000 workers and 100,000 inhabitants, on an area of 150 ha (370 acres). The city was to have numerous business buildings, department stores, hotels, educational facilities, scientific venues and medical institutes. The project wasn't carried through and the two neighborhoods remained disconnected, though they both independently formed one urban unit with Belgrade in time and in 1972 were abolished as separate settlements and annexed to Belgrade as its neighborhoods. In 1970-71 4,500 people moved into the Kneževac-Kijevo neighborhood. According to the 1970 census, Kneževac, still a separate settlement, had a population of 13,022, but 8,823 belonged to the Kijevo-Petlovo Brdo section, making Kijevo twice larger than Kneževac itself.
