= Petlovo Brdo =

Petlovo Brdo Петлово Брдо
- Urban neighbourhood
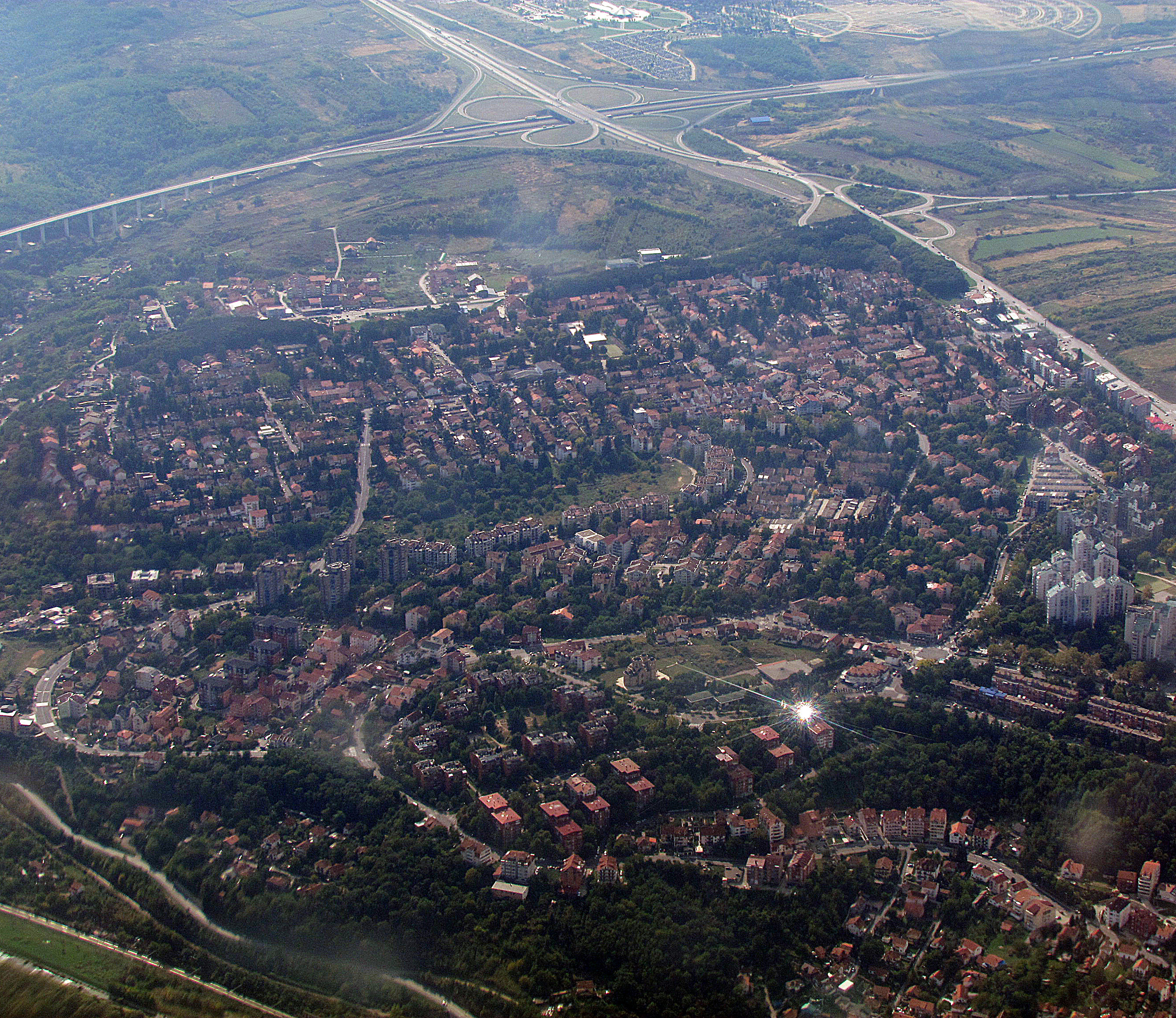

- Location within Belgrade
- Coordinates: 44.7200°N 20.4231°E
- Country: Serbia
- Region: Belgrade
- Municipality: Rakovica

Area
  - Total: 0.82 km^{2} (0.32 sq mi)
- Time zone: UTC+1 (CET)
  - Summer (DST): UTC+2 (CEST)
- Area code: +381(0)11
- Car plates: BG

Petlovo Brdo or colloquially among the local population Pevac (Serbian Cyrillic: Петлово Брдо or Певац) is an urban neighborhood of Belgrade, the capital of Serbia. It is located in Belgrade's municipality of Rakovica.

== Location ==
Petlovo Brdo is located in the central part of the municipality, on the eastern slopes of the 205 meters high hill of the same name (meaning "Rooster Hill"). The neighborhood developed on the crossing of two major suburban roads of Belgrade, Ibar Highway and Kružni put. It is bordered by the neighborhoods of Labudovo Brdo on the north and Kijevo on the east, while west and south from the neighborhood are still not urbanized. Further to the west is the neighborhood of Železnik, while further to the south the cemetery of Orlovača, both in the municipality of Čukarica.

== Characteristics ==
The name of the hill appeared after 1950.

By 2010, total forested area in the neighborhood covered 8.74 ha (21.6 acres) With the expansion of the population of jackals in the Belgrade's outskirts since the 2000s, the jackals were reported around the neighborhood in the spring of 2022.

== Park Borići ==
In the southwest part of the neighborhood, along the Kružni put and its crossroad with the Ibar Highway, a park named Borići ("small pines") was formed. Apart from the existing interchange, a new, looped one for the intersection of the Ibar Highway and the projected Belgrade bypass was planned. In 2013, it counted 1,652 individual trees and the original project envisioned cutting of the entire park. Citizen protested but in time divided in two groups. After negotiations with the planners, one group accepted cutting of 261 trees, while the other opposed any cutting, asking for the rerouting of the bypass.

In May 2018, amidst the ongoing protests in the park, backed up by the police, the state road company cut some 160 trees claiming that it will reforest the remaining part, build a children's playground and the noise barrier. They also accused "some 100 protesters" for delays of 5 years and diminished safety for "millions of commuters", even though construction of the bypass began in 1991 and at this time it is not even half finished. Some citizens continued with the protests.
