= Topčiderka =

Topčiderska River Топчидерка / Topčiderka
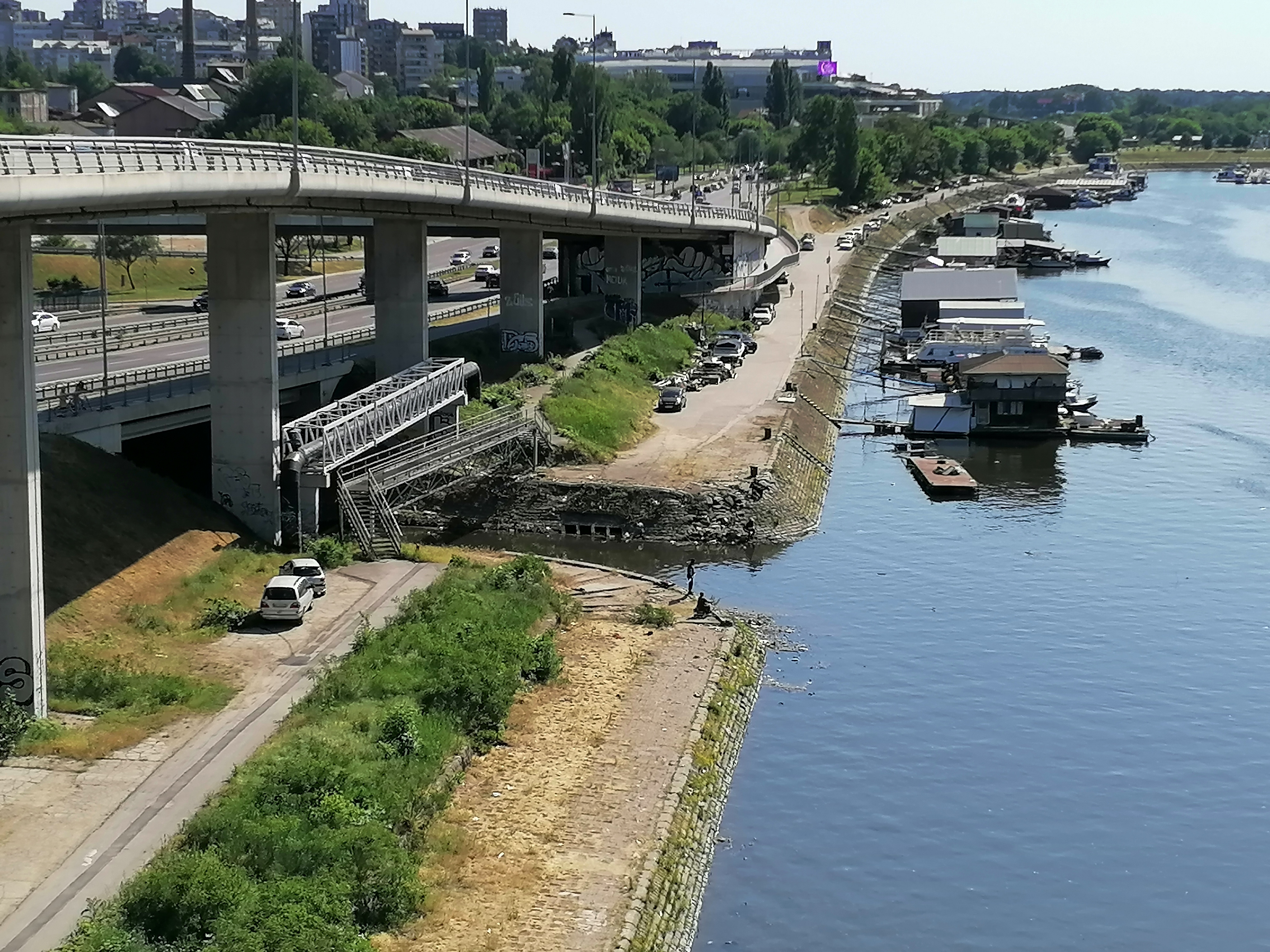
- Topčiderka's mouth into Sava.
- Native name: Topčiderska reka (Serbian)

Location
- Country: Serbia

Physical characteristics
- Source
  - location: Lipovica Forest, Kosmaj mountain
- Mouth
  - location: Sava, at Belgrade
  - coordinates: 44°47′32″N 20°25′31″E
  - elevation: 192 m (630 ft)
- Basin size: 147 km^{2} (57 sq mi)

Basin features
- Progression: Sava→ Danube→ Black Sea

Topčiderska River (Serbian: Топчидерска река / Topčiderska reka, "Topčider River"), or colloquially Topčiderka (Serbian Cyrillic: Топчидерка), or Topčiderski Creek (Serbian: Топчидерски поток / Topčiderski potok, "Topčider Creek"), is a river in north-central Serbia, a 30 km-long right tributary to the Sava river to which it flows in the urban section of Belgrade. It is one of the 40 rivers, streams and creeks that flow or used to flow through Belgrade (majority of them is conducted underground into the city sewage system).

== Geography ==
=== Course ===
The Topčiderska reka originates in the Lipovica (Lipovica Forest) area, on the northern slopes of the Parcanski vis, the northern section of the Kosmaj mountain, at an altitude of 192 meters. Originally, it flows to the north-east, until it reaches the Belgrade's suburb of Ripanj, in the municipality of Voždovac. From there, the river flows generally into the north-west direction, along the Šumadija's geological bar into which the river carved its epigenetic valley and formed a watershed. The valley of Topčiderka is a natural route for the Belgrade-Niš railway.

After it flows between the villages of Pinosava and Rušanj (western slopes of the Avala mountain), the Topčiderka enters the urban section of Belgrade (Rakovica municipality) at the neighborhood of Resnik. It continues through the neighborhoods of Kijevo, Labudovo Brdo, Kneževac, Rakovica, Miljakovac and Kanarevo Brdo.

At this point, the river enters the territory of the municipality of Savski Venac where the vast woods of Topčider are formed. After the Topčiderka passes next to the Konak of Prince Miloš and the Belgrade Hippodrome, it empties into the Čukarica Bay of the Sava river, across the northern tip of the Ada Ciganlija island, at an altitude of 69 meters. It drains an area of 147 km^{2} (out of which 70% is agricultural land) with 35 tributaries and belongs to the Black Sea drainage basin.

Two sections along the river are organized as the game hunting grounds. One is Lipovička Šuma, near the spring of the river and another, Topčiderska Reka, at the Rakovica-Čukarica municipal border.

=== Tributaries ===
Tributaries of the Topčiderka include:

- Rakovički potok (right, at Kneževac)
- Jelezovac (right, at Kanarevo Brdo)
- Kaljavi potok (right, at Kanarevo Brdo)
- Kijevski potok (left, at Kijevo)
- Kadinac (left, at Resnik)
- Siklijevac (left, at Resnik)
- Pariguz (right, at Resnik)
- Milojkin Potok (left, at Resnik)
- Šindrakovac (left, at Pinosava)
- Avalski potok (right, at Pinosava)
- Bela reka (left, at Ripanj-Kolonija)
- Prečica (right, at Ripanj-Stepašinovac)
- Palanački potok (left, at Ripanj-Stepašinovac)
- Smrdanski potok (right, at Ripanj-Prnjavor)

== Human history ==
The Romani settlement existed on the Ada Ciganlija in the 17th century but was displaced from the island to the Sava's right bank, at the mouth of the Topčiderka, before the Austrian occupation of Belgrade from 1717 to 1739. Whether it happened some time before or during the fighting from 1716 to 1718, is not known. One map from the Austrian period shows a Romani settlement with 24 houses at the mouth of Topčiderka. Maps also show that the settlement existed during the next Austrian occupation from 1788 to 1791.

State government decided in 1821 to organize food trade and to check the quantity and quality of the goods imported to the city. Part of the project was introduction of the excise on the goods (in Serbian called trošarina) and setting of a series of excise check points on the roads leading to the city. One of those check points, which all gradually also became known as trošarina, was located next to the river's mouth into the Sava in the 1830s and 1840s, and became known as Gospodarska Mehana. It was also a location of the ferry which transported pigs across the Sava into the Austria. This trošarina also functioned as a customs house. On 25 January 1859, when prince Miloš Obrenović and his son Mihailo Obrenović returned to Serbia, they disembarked here. The customs house was dismantled first. Later, the large storehouse was demolished, too, while the kafana Gospodarska Mehana survived until 2013.

By the early 1930s, state rowing championships, and Danube States Rowing Championship have been held at Ada Ciganlija. The 1932 European Rowing Championships was held 2–4 September 1932 at the island. For this occasion, a straight, 2,000 metres (6,600 ft) long track was arranged between the island and the Topčiderka, hangars and stands ("water stadium") were built on the island, while the administrative headquarters of the Belgrade Rowing Club were later built at the mouth of the Topčiderka.

== Characteristics ==
=== Pollution ===
Despite its river bed has been arranged and concreted in majority of its urban course, the Topčiderka still floods the surrounding areas of Belgrade during heavy rains. Over 160,000 inhabitants lives in the urban section of Topčiderka. As a result of high density of population and sewage systems, industrial zones the river passes through and advanced erosion, Topčiderka is notoriously highly polluted, which resulted in City government's 2007 Study on cleaning the river and its drainage basin, which was officially presented in May 2008. The study is the first ever complete collection of measures for Topčiderka improvement. Concrete bed for the further 7 kilometers are projected, so as the seven small reservoirs (added to the already existing two) which will prevent floodings and make irrigation possible. City architect, Đorđe Bobić, stated that "once we protected the city from the river, now the time has come to protect the river from the city".

When Ada Ciganlija was connected to the mainland via the embankments in 1967, arm of the Sava river which separated the island was transformed into the Čukarica Bay in its northern part. Since the early 1980s there is a constant ecological problem due to the massive pollution of the bay as a result of the polluted waters of the Topčiderka river which flows into the bay. The garbage and highly polluted silt fills the bay and creates shoals. During low-tide, the bay is unusable for the boats in the marina, located in the middle of the bay or for the kayakers of Partizan and Crvena Zvezda who use the bay for practice. The silt is up to 5 m (16 ft) thick, smells bad and is poisonous so the swimming in the bay is forbidden. In 2011 the estimated amount of garbage sludge in the bay was 120,000 m^{3} (4,200,000 cu ft). The sludge cannot simply be dredged and thrown in the Sava further downstream due to the toxicity. The plan to build a treatment plant on the bank near the Belgrade Fair which would detoxicate the sludge and produce fertilizer from it was scrapped due to the high costs. For now, the silt is being dredged and vegetation cut just enough to make it navigable for the small boats in the marina.

As a result of collection waste from farming households in its upper course, illegal housing and untreated industrial wastewater from the Rakovica industrial region, the mouth of the Topčiderka into the Sava was described by the environmentalists in March 2019 as the "open concrete (waste) collector". Because of this, the river is jokingly also called Kolektorka. The water is constantly in the fifth, lowest category, and the river turns black occasionally, smelling bad. An experiment was held when the water from the river and bay was pumped into the special pools in the nursery gardens of the "Srbijašume", state company for the forest management. The water was treated by various selected plants, and the quality of the water improved from the fifth into the second category. The authorities didn't pursue this technology on the location, known as phytoremediation, further. Instead, in 2019 and 2020 it was applied at the Lake Trešnja, in the suburb of Ripanj, and proved to be highly successful in reducing pollutants in the water.

=== Transportation ===
After the Ada Bridge across the Sava was finished in 2012, a major Radnička interchange was built above the river's mouth into the Čukarica Bay. Within the projects of the optimizing the bridge's function since then, there are some changes concerning the river itself. Within the scope of the construction of the new tram routes across the bridge, the already existing tram bridge across the Topčiderka will be removed but the pillars will be preserved and used for the new track bridge. The planned construction of the road connection of the bridge with Rakovica includes the relocation of the Topčiderka riverbed for 1 km (0.62 mi), construction of a new bridge across the Pere Velimirovića Street in Rakovica's neighborhood of Kanarevo Brdo and reconstruction and widening of the Bulevar patrijarha Pavla which is designated to be the most important traffic route in this part of Belgrade. Stretching along the valley of the river, it is envisioned as the main transit corridor which would connect the European route E75 (Belgrade-Niš highway), New Belgrade, Ada Bridge, Patrijarha Dimitrija Street, Ibar Highway, Kružni put and the Belgrade bypass. As of January 2018, the timeline of the entire project is unknown, as only a partial request for tendering was announced.

Due to the road, bridge and interchange construction, the section of the river was moved 20 m (66 ft) to the east. As this is the location where the stream of Kaljavi Potok flows into the Topčiderka, its mouth was also moved while the final 100 m (330 ft) of its flow were conducted underground, through the pipes. The new bridge is 19 m (62 ft) long and 26 m (85 ft) wide, with three lanes in each direction. The works on the relocation of the river began on 1 March 2018, and were finished by August 2019. The bridge became operational on 22 March 2019. Further widening of the boulevard along the river began in the late summer of 2019, and was set to finish in the spring of 2021, but the deadline was moved to September 2021, then to May 2022, and to October 2022, before the deadline was moved for the summer of 2024. In October 2023 mayor Aleksandar Šapić blamed the Russian invasion of Ukraine for further delays.

=== Future projects ===
In September 2017, the project for the reconstruction of the Hippodrome was announced. A work of Marija Krsmanović Stringeta, Anđelka Badnjar and Milena Kordić, the projected new complex will include the hotel and the sports center on the bank of the river, instead of the present "Jugopetrol" oil depots. The project will include the new pathways along the river, which would directly connect the Hippodrome with the main road along the Sava river.

In July 2021, city announced that project for flash flood warnings is being applied on several rivers and streams on the territory of Belgrade, with the Topčiderka being the first on the list. Some 20 hydrological stations and 40 rain gauges will be placed in the river's watershed. Also announced was the retention basin on the Sikijevac stream in Resnik, also in the Topčiderka's watershed.

== Sources ==
- Mala Prosvetina Enciklopedija, Third edition (1985); Prosveta; ISBN 86-07-00001-2
- Jovan Đ. Marković (1990): Enciklopedijski geografski leksikon Jugoslavije; Svjetlost-Sarajevo; ISBN 86-01-02651-6
