= Rakovica, Belgrade =

Rakovica Раковица (Serbian)
- Municipality
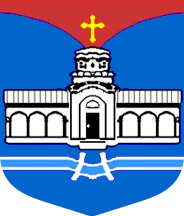
- Coat of arms

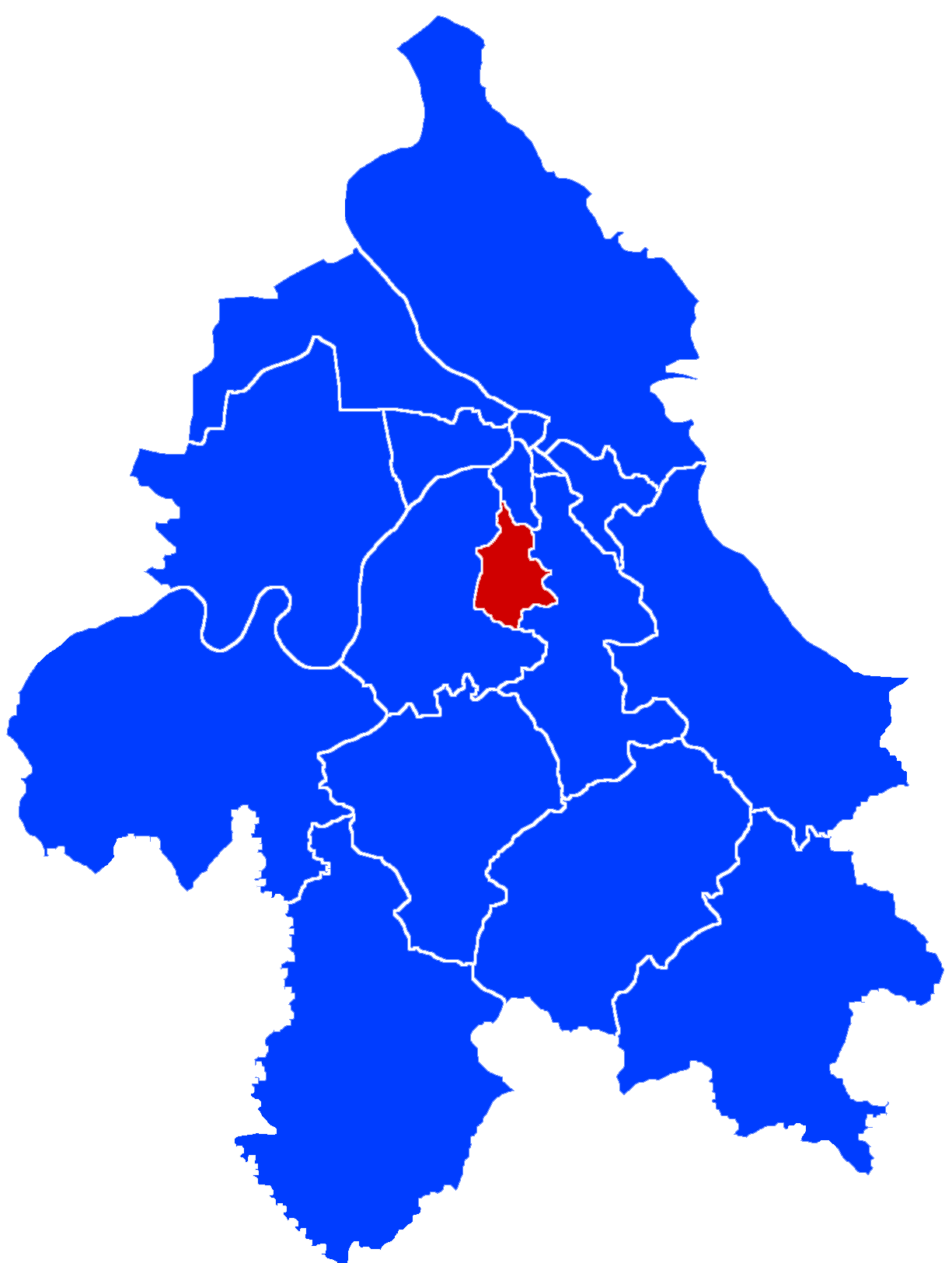
- Location within the city of Belgrade
- Interactive map of Rakovica
- Coordinates: 44°44′45.10″N 20°26′42.23″E
- Country: Serbia
- City: Belgrade
- Status: Municipality
- Settlements: 1
- First mentioned: 1560
- Municipality status: 1952; 1974

Government
  - Type: Municipality of Belgrade
  - Mun. president: Miloš Simić (SNS)

Area
  - Total: 30.05 km^{2} (11.60 sq mi)

Population (2022)
  - Total: 104,456
  - Density: 3,476/km^{2} (9,003/sq mi)
- Time zone: UTC+1 (CET)
  - Summer (DST): UTC+2 (CEST)
- Postal code: 11090
- Area code: +381(0)11
- Car plates: BG

Rakovica (Serbian Cyrillic: Раковица, pronounced [râːkɔʋitsa]) is a municipality of the city of Belgrade. According to the 2022 census results, the municipality has 104,456 inhabitants.

The municipality of Rakovica is located south of downtown Belgrade. It is bordered by the municipalities of Savski Venac on the north, Voždovac on the east and Čukarica on the west and south. Its neighborhood of Resnik marks the southernmost point of the Belgrade City Proper (uža teritorija grada).

== History ==
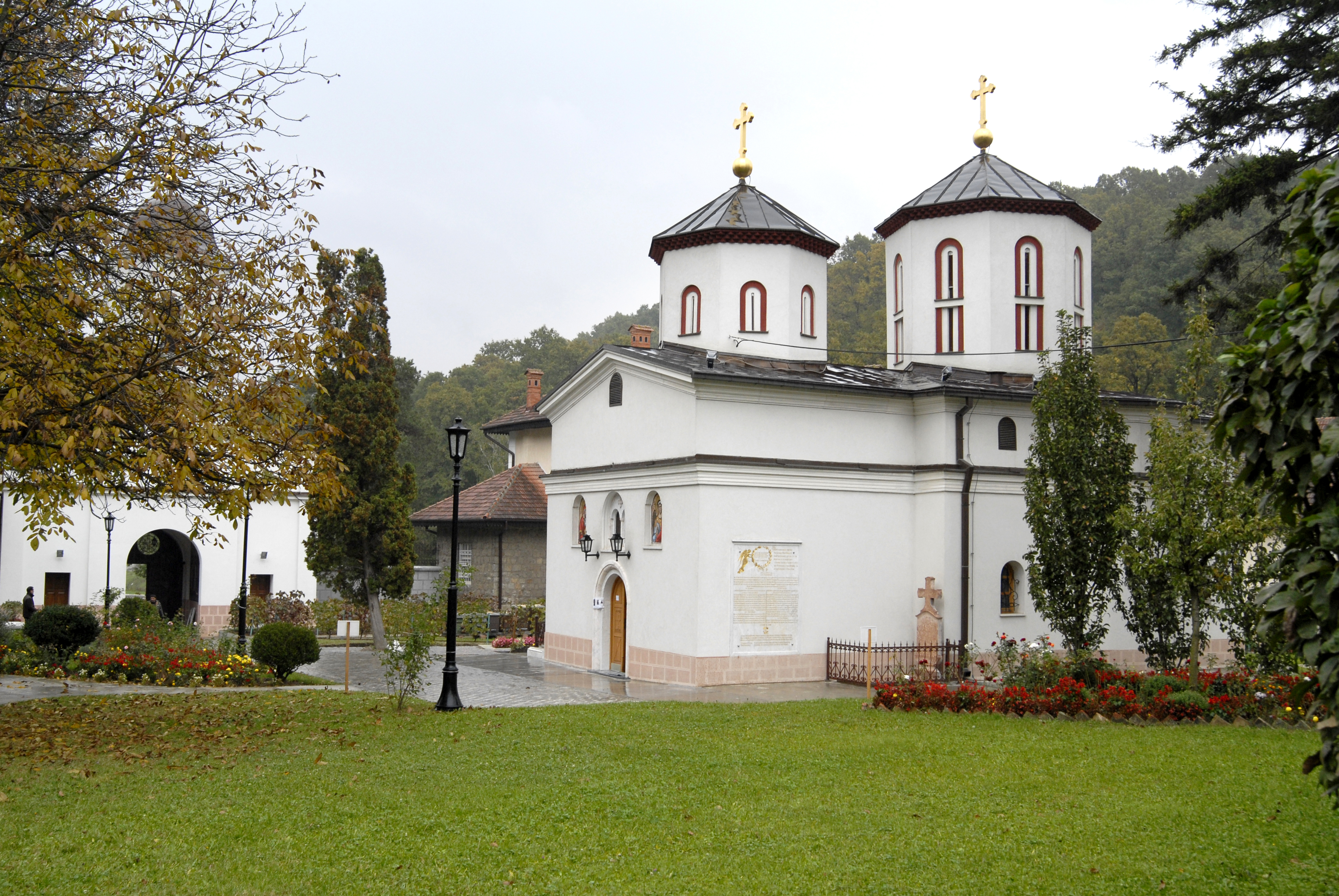
Rakovica Monastery

The first settlement on the territory of present-day Rakovica was mentioned in the Ottoman 1560 population census as a village called Vlaha. Tradition has it that the place got its name after the crayfish (Serbian: rak, rakovica), which allegedly inhabited the Rakovički potok which streamed through the village. The first mention of the monastery, under the name of Racauicense monasterium, was by Feliks Petančić in 1502. The village gradually turned into a suburb and then the neighborhood of Belgrade, one of the most heavily industrialized areas of Belgrade. According to the 1981 census, the neighborhood (local community, mesna zajednica) of Rakovica had a population of 17,871, about one fifth of the municipal population. However, the local community was later split into several smaller ones, and those strictly comprising the area of the neighborhood of Rakovica had a population of 9,901 in 2002.

From June 1945 to December 1946, Rakovica was one of 5 administrative neighborhoods within Belgrade's Raion VII. Municipality of Rakovica was created in 1952, after the previous division of Belgrade into raions, from 1945 to 1952, ended. In 1960 the municipality was annexed to the neighboring Čukarica, but split again in 1974. The Day of the Municipality is October 14, the patron day of the Shroud of the Most Holy Virgin.

In the 2020s the crime rate in the neighborhood rose, especially the criminal showdowns.

=== 1999 NATO bombing ===
During the NATO bombing of the former Yugoslavia, Rakovica was the only municipality in Belgrade to be targeted almost every night, and eventually every day. The most heavy attacks were suffered by the Straževica hill (under which was the Yugoslavian underground base), as well as the Monastery forest, most probably because anti-aircraft weapons were located there. Although not all of Rakovica was under direct attack, the largest part of the municipality suffered collateral damage.

== Geography ==
Rakovica is located in the valley of the Topčiderka river, where the brook of Rakovički potok flows into the river Sava, 9-10 kilometers (~6 mi) from Terazije, downtown Belgrade. The neighborhood developed between two large woods, Košutnjak on the north and Manastirska šuma, on the south, north of the Rakovica monastery. It is bordered by the neighborhoods of Kanarevo Brdo on the north-east, Miljakovac on the east, Kneževac on the south and Vidikovac and Skojevsko Naselje on the west. As in many cases, the boundaries between the neighborhoods are not firmly set, so in some parts Rakovica overlaps with Kneževac or Miljakovac, for example. The neighborhood of Selo Rakovica (Village Rakovica) is some 6-7 kilometers (~4 mi) further to the east, belongs to the municipality of Voždovac and is generally not associated with the term Rakovica.

Rakovica covers an area of 31.8 square kilometers (12.3 sq mi). It is located in a hilly area, with numerous hillocks out of which many got urbanized and developed into Belgrade neighborhoods: Miljakovac (193m/633 ft), Petlovo Brdo (205m/673 ft; the top of the hill is in the municipality of Čukarica), Kanarevo Brdo, Labudovo Brdo, Straževica, Košutnjak, Vidikovac, etc.

The municipality mostly lies in the valley of the Topčiderka river. There are numerous other streams in the area, most of which flow into the Topčiderka: Rakovički potok, Jelezovac, Zmajevac, Pariguz, Kijevski potok, etc.

Central and northern sections of the municipalities are wooded areas. Entire northern section actually covers the southern part of the large park-wood Košutnjak, while the woods of Miljakovac and Manastir (Miljakovačka šuma and Manastirska šuma) are located in the central parts, on the slopes of the hills of Miljakovac and Straževica, respectively.

== Neighborhoods ==
- Jelezovac
- Kanarevo Brdo
- Kijevo
- Kneževac
- Labudovo Brdo
- Miljakovac
- Miljakovac I
- Miljakovac II
- Miljakovac III
- Petlovo Brdo
- Pionirski Grad
- Rakovica
- Resnik
- Skojevsko Naselje
- Stari košutnjak
- Straževica
- Sunčani Breg
- Vidikovac
- Petlovo Brdo

== Demographics ==
Historical population
Year	Pop.	±% p.a.
1948	14,082	—
1953	15,966	+2.54%
1961	28,613	+7.56%
1971	50,798	+5.91%
1981	87,067	+5.54%
1991	97,752	+1.16%
2002	99,000	+0.12%
2011	108,641	+1.04%

According to the 2011 census population of municipality was 108,641 inhabitants. Previously one of the urban Belgrade's municipalities with highest population growth, since the 1990s the growth slowed. However, Rakovica remains one of the most densely populated municipalities of Belgrade with 3,504 inhabitants per square kilometer (9,080/sq mi).

=== Ethnic groups ===
The ethnic composition of the municipality:

Ethnic group	Population 2011
Serbs	100,937
Montenegrins	783
Romani	600
Macedonians	536
Croats	434
Yugoslavs	400
Gorani	331
Muslims	194
Bosniaks	114
Albanians	105
Hungarians	103
Total	108,641

== Administration ==
Recent presidents of the municipality:

- 1989–1992; Miodrag Vidojković (b. 1936)
- 1992–1996; Slavica Tanasković
- 1996–2000; Predrag Dokmanović (b. 1957)
- 2000–2004; Srboslav S. Zečević (b. 1940)
- 2004–2012; Bojan Milić (b. 1972)
- 2012–2014; Milosav Miličković (b. 1959) (SNS)
- 2014–2020; Vladan Kocić (b. 1963) (SNS)
- 2020–present: Miloš Simić (b. 1990) (SNS)

== Economy ==
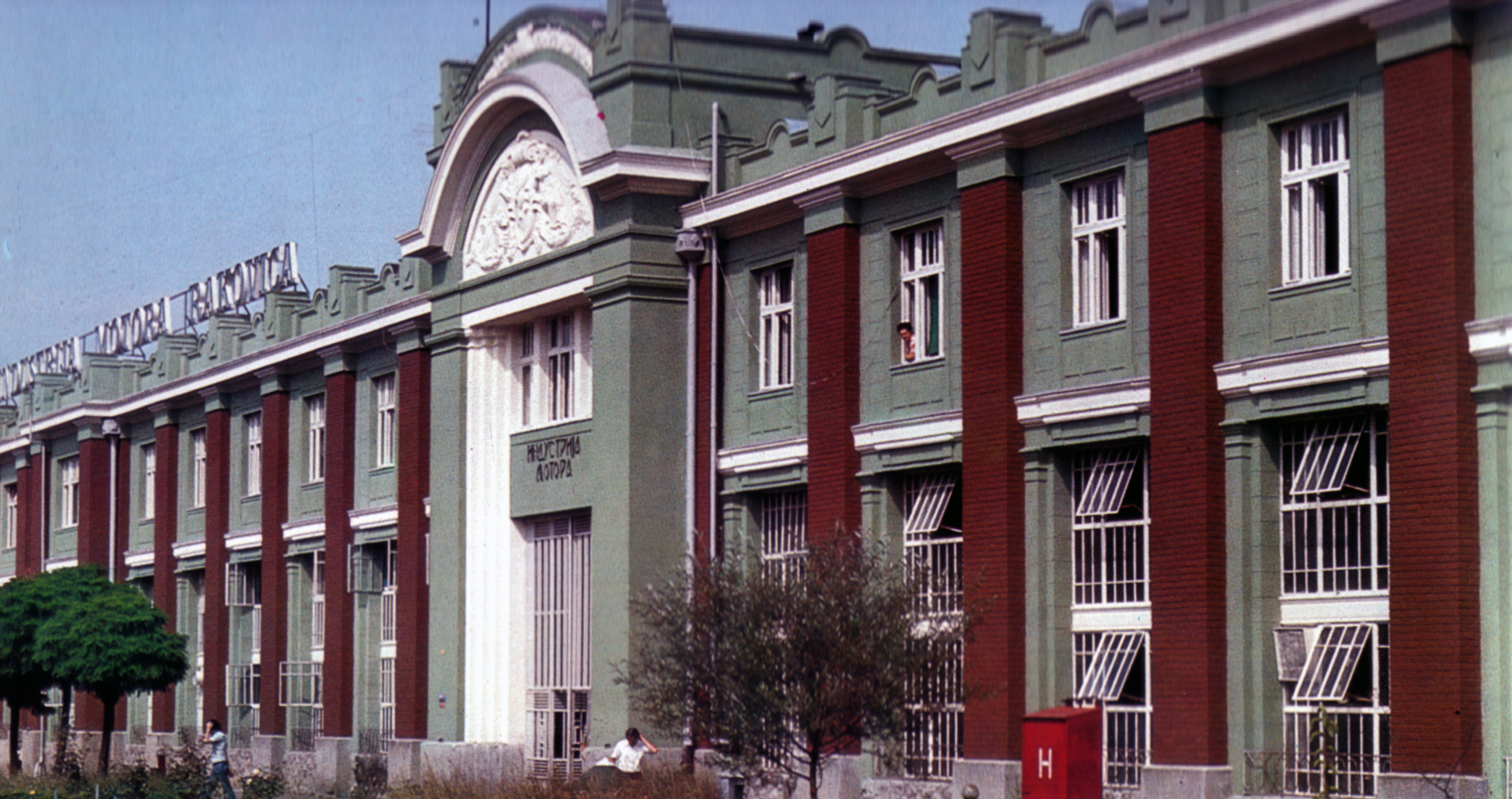
Industrija Motora Rakovica

Rakovica is one of the most industrialized parts of Belgrade. Some of the factories in the area include: Industrija Motora Rakovica (engine factory), Rekord (tire factory), 21 Maj (tractors and other agricultural vehicles factory), Frigostroj (coolers and air conditioners factory), IMP (foundry), Tehnogas MESSER (oxygen and acetylene factory), etc. Most of these factories suffered badly in the transition process. Another industrialized area of the municipality is the neighborhood of Kijevo with the quarry which supplies the entire Belgrade's building industry with stone and slates. The remaining industry is also mostly into construction and building (building companies and cement plants Komgrap, Graditelj, etc.).

Rakovica is located on important traffic routes. The valley of Rakovički potok is a route to the Kružni put, suburban road of Belgrade and the future part of the projected Belgrade beltway, and a Belgrade-Požarevac railway, while the valley of Topčiderka is a route to the Belgrade-Niš railway. The other important roads in the municipality are Patrijarha Dimitrija street which goes through the middle of the urbanized area and Ibarska magistrala on the western edge of the municipality.

MOC, Machines educational center and the Institute for the engines are located in Rakovica.

On 19 October 2017, a large shopping mall Kapitol park ("Capitol Park") was open in Rakovica, on the location of the former Rekord tire factory. A €30 million investment, it has a total floor area of 25,000 m^{2} (270,000 sq ft). After a delay from June 2016, the construction began in March 2017. It is the largest retail park in Belgrade.

The following table gives a preview of total number of registered people employed in legal entities per their core activity (as of 2018):

Activity	Total
Agriculture, forestry and fishing	115
Mining and quarrying	28
Manufacturing	2,482
Electricity, gas, steam and air conditioning supply	169
Water supply; sewerage, waste management and remediation activities	183
Construction	852
Wholesale and retail trade, repair of motor vehicles and motorcycles	5,490
Transportation and storage	1,178
Accommodation and food services	669
Information and communication	632
Financial and insurance activities	197
Real estate activities	51
Professional, scientific and technical activities	1,526
Administrative and support service activities	1,283
Public administration and defense; compulsory social security	697
Education	1,192
Human health and social work activities	1,300
Arts, entertainment and recreation	369
Other service activities	476
Individual agricultural workers	10
Total	18,897

== Sports ==
Local football club FK Rakovica has once played in the Second League of FR Yugoslavia.

== See also ==
- Subdivisions of Belgrade
- List of Belgrade neighborhoods and suburbs

== Notes and references ==
Notes

- Mala Prosvetina Enciklopedija, Third edition (1985); Prosveta; ISBN 86-07-00001-2
- Jovan Đ. Marković (1990): Enciklopedijski geografski leksikon Jugoslavije; Svjetlost-Sarajevo; ISBN 86-01-02651-6
- Beograd - plan grada; M@gic M@p, 2006; ISBN 86-83501-53-1
