= Kanarevo Brdo =

Kanarevo Brdo Канарево брдо
- Urban neighbourhood
- Location within Belgrade
- Coordinates: 44°45′11″N 20°27′26″E
- Country: Serbia
- Region: Belgrade
- Municipality: Rakovica
- Time zone: UTC+1 (CET)
  - Summer (DST): UTC+2 (CEST)
- Area code: +381(0)11
- Car plates: BG

Kanarevo brdo (Serbian Cyrillic: Канарево брдо, meaning "Kanar's Hill") is an urban neighborhood of Belgrade, the capital of Serbia. It is located in Belgrade's municipality of Rakovica.

== Location ==
Kanarevo Brdo is located in the northwestern section of the municipality, on the border of the municipality of Voždovac. It lies in the valley of the stream of Kaljavi potok, on its mouth into the Topčiderka river. It is bordered by the neighborhoods of Banjica, Topčider and Lisičji Potok on the north, Košutnjak on the west, Rakovica on the southeast, Miljakovac I on the south and Miljakovac II on the east. The neighborhood is bounded by the streets of Patrijarha Dimitrija (west), Pere Velimirovića (north) and Borska (east and south).

== History ==
Kanarevo Brdo developed on the right bank of the Topčiderka river, in southern section of the large park-woods Košutnjak and Topčider, on the road connecting downtown Belgrade to, at that time, industrial suburb of Rakovica. It still remains mainly residential area, with two elementary schools (Đura Jakšić and Ivo Andrić), a medical centre, soccer field of the FK Rakovica and an open green market, with a population of 11,320 in 2011 (combined population of the local communities of Kanarevo Brdo, 6,376 and Košutnjak, 4,944).

== Name ==
The name of the hill appeared after 1950. it was named after the Kanar family, which owned the land where the neighborhood developed later, after the state nationalized the land.

== Characteristics ==
Historical population
Year	Pop.	±%
1981	13,798	—
1991	15,143	+9.7%
2002	14,842	−2.0%
2011	11,320	−23.7%

In 2011 a project of the revitalization of the Kaljavi potok was announced. The stream is already channeled and has a concrete bed, but it also receives waters from many local cesspits. It was envisioned as the green oasis between the trolleybus terminus in Banjica and the "Tehnogas" factory in Kanarevo Brdo, just 5 km (3.1 mi) from downtown Belgrade. The 800-metre-long (2,625 ft) section of the stream was projected as the history and nature reserve as it was to include the remnants of the Banjicaćs paleolithic site, pedestrian and bicycle paths, trim trail, a series of small bridges over the stream, three natural springs, limestone above-the-ground formations and the habitat of 20 species of rare birds, not usually find in the urbanized areas. The entire revitalized area was projected at 8 ha (20 acres) and should comprise the surrounding forest, rearranged forest paths, outdoor gym, children playgrounds and gazebos. The illegally built houses, fences, gardens and sewage drains along the stream were to be demolished. It was supposed to be the starting phase of the creation of the "green-blue corridors", the network of arranged forest and water sections all over the city, and the next project was already slated to be the stream of Jelezovac potok, a tributary to the Kaljavi potok. As of 2017, nothing from the entire project has been done.
