= Železnik =

Železnik Железник
- Urban neighbourhood
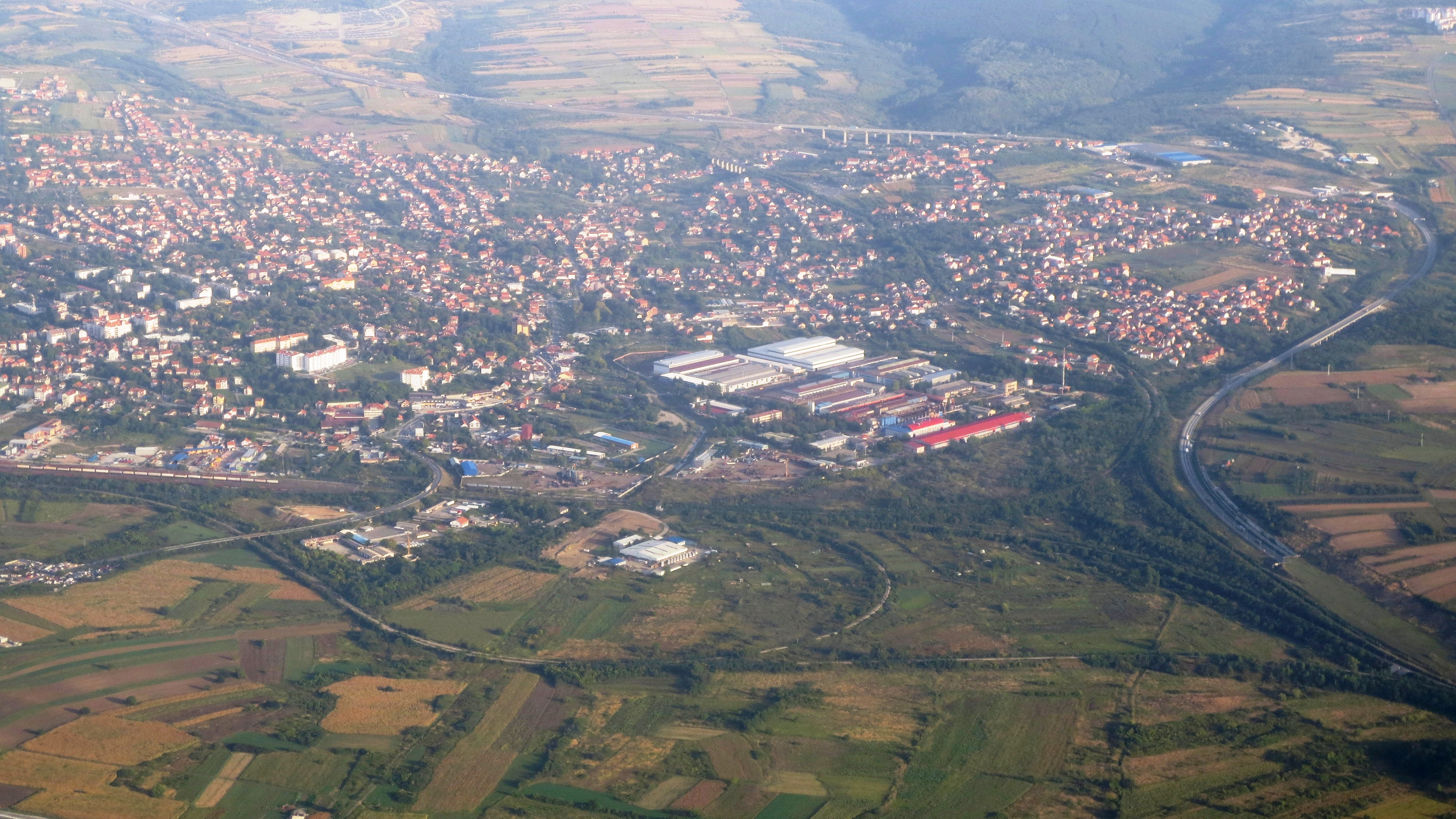
- Aerial view on Železnik

- Location within Belgrade
- Coordinates: 44°43′N 20°22′E
- Country: Serbia
- Region: Belgrade
- Municipality: Čukarica

Area
  - Total: 21.29 km^{2} (8.22 sq mi)

Population (2002)
  - Total: 20.851
  - Density: 0.9794/km^{2} (2.537/sq mi)
- Time zone: UTC+1 (CET)
  - Summer (DST): UTC+2 (CEST)
- Area code: +381(0)11
- Car plates: BG

Železnik (Serbian Cyrillic: Железник, pronounced [ʒě̞le̞zniːk]) is an urban neighborhood of Belgrade, Serbia. It is located in Belgrade's municipality of Čukarica.

== Location ==
Železnik is located in the central part of the Čukarica municipality, 17 kilometres (11 miles) southwest from downtown Belgrade. It borders Makiš to the north, and apart from a narrow strip of urbanized land alongside the Belgrade-Bar railway and Vodovodska Street towards Žarkovo in the northeast, it has no urban connection to other parts of Belgrade.

Several streams flow through the neighborhood, the creeks of Krušik and Krušički potok and a small river of Čitačka reka.

The Ibar Highway and the A1 motorway both pass nearby Železnik.

== History and population ==
Železnik village was founded in the 17th century. Construction of the modern settlement began in 1947, as a worker's settlement for the employees of the newly constructed Ivo Lola Ribar factory. Soon, plans were made for a completely new settlement, a major and heavily industrialized suburb of Belgrade (Železnik, Serbian for Iron City), with a population of 80.000, but that goal is not achieved.

Some 15,600 of youth workers participated in the construction of the new town through the Youth work actions.

Until the 20th century, Železnik was separated from Žarkovo, and further to the north from Belgrade, by lush forests. In the expansion of the population of jackals in the outskirts of Belgrade since the 2000s, the animals were recorded in Železnik in the spring of 2022.

The 1960s General urban plan of Belgrade envisioned the urban joining of Kneževac-Kijevo and Železnik, along the Kružni put road, creating a secondary center of Belgrade. The planned suburban city was to have 35,000 workers and 100,000 inhabitants, on an area of 150 ha (370 acres). The city was to have numerous business buildings, department stores, hotels, educational facilities, scientific venues and medical institutes. The project wasn't carried through and the two neighborhoods remained disconnected, though they both independently formed one urban unit with Belgrade in time and in 1972 were abolished as separate settlements and annexed to Belgrade as its neighborhoods.

Formerly a separate municipality, it was a separate town until 1972, when was administratively annexed to the Belgrade City proper. Population of Železnik:

- 1921 - 1,987
- 1961 - 10,727
- 1971 - 16,912
- 1981 - 19,731
- 2002 - 20,851

== Stari Železnik ==
Stari Železnik (Serbian for Old Železnik) is the oldest part of Železnik. It is located in the northwestern part of the neighborhood, south of the old cemetery. In 1981 Stari Železnik had a population of 6,766, which was almost 35% of the entire neighborhood's population. The neighborhood is connected with line 55 (Zvezdara /Local market/ - Stari Železnik).

== Novi Železnik ==
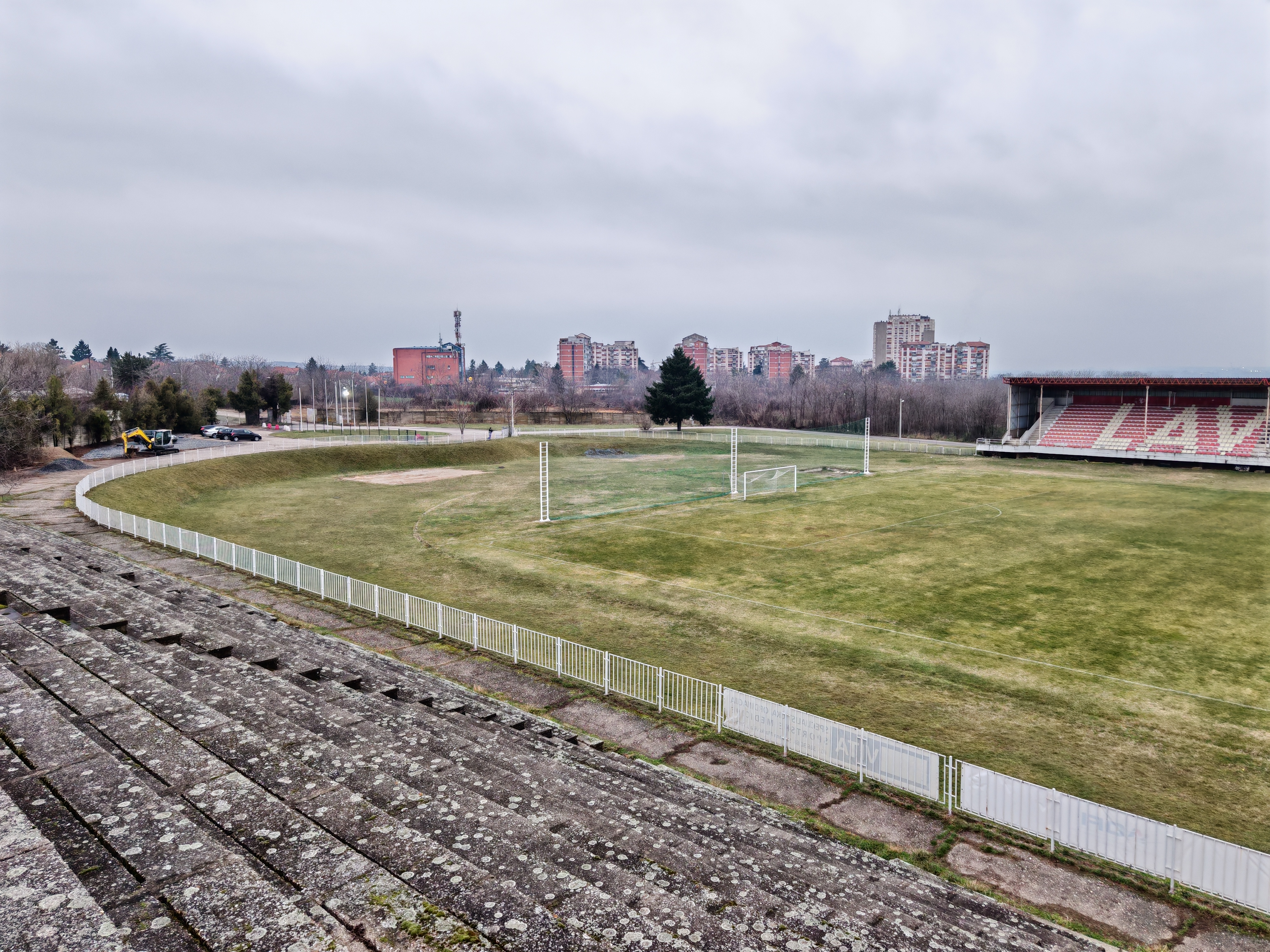
View towards the south of Železnik Stadium with neighborhood in the distance, February 2026

Novi Železnik is a completely new settlement, constructed in west of the Ivo Lola Ribar factory, in the northwestern corner of the settlement. It stretches from the grade separating junction of Ivo Lola Ribar Street on the west, to the Železnik Stadium on the east. Unlike the village, it has straight streets, a clinic, post office, shopping mall, gas station, green market, etc. The neighborhood is connected with lines 58 (Pančevački most /Railway station/ - Novi Železnik) and 88 (Zemun /Quay of liberation/ - Novi Železnik).

The settlement was designed by architect Branko Petričić.

== Economy ==
The major facility in the neighborhood is the Ivo Lola Ribar factory, specialized in production of heavy machines and machine tools. Accordingly, a machinery and metallurgy high school is located in the neighborhood as well.

Železnik has a train station, and the railway passes on the western outskirts of the neighborhood. Also, a large train station and a Belgrade marshalling yard is located in the nearby neighborhood of Makiš.

In Železnik there is also the headquarters of BT System company, which specializes in security systems
