= Rušanj =

Village in Serbia

Coordinates: 44°40′54″N 20°26′26″E

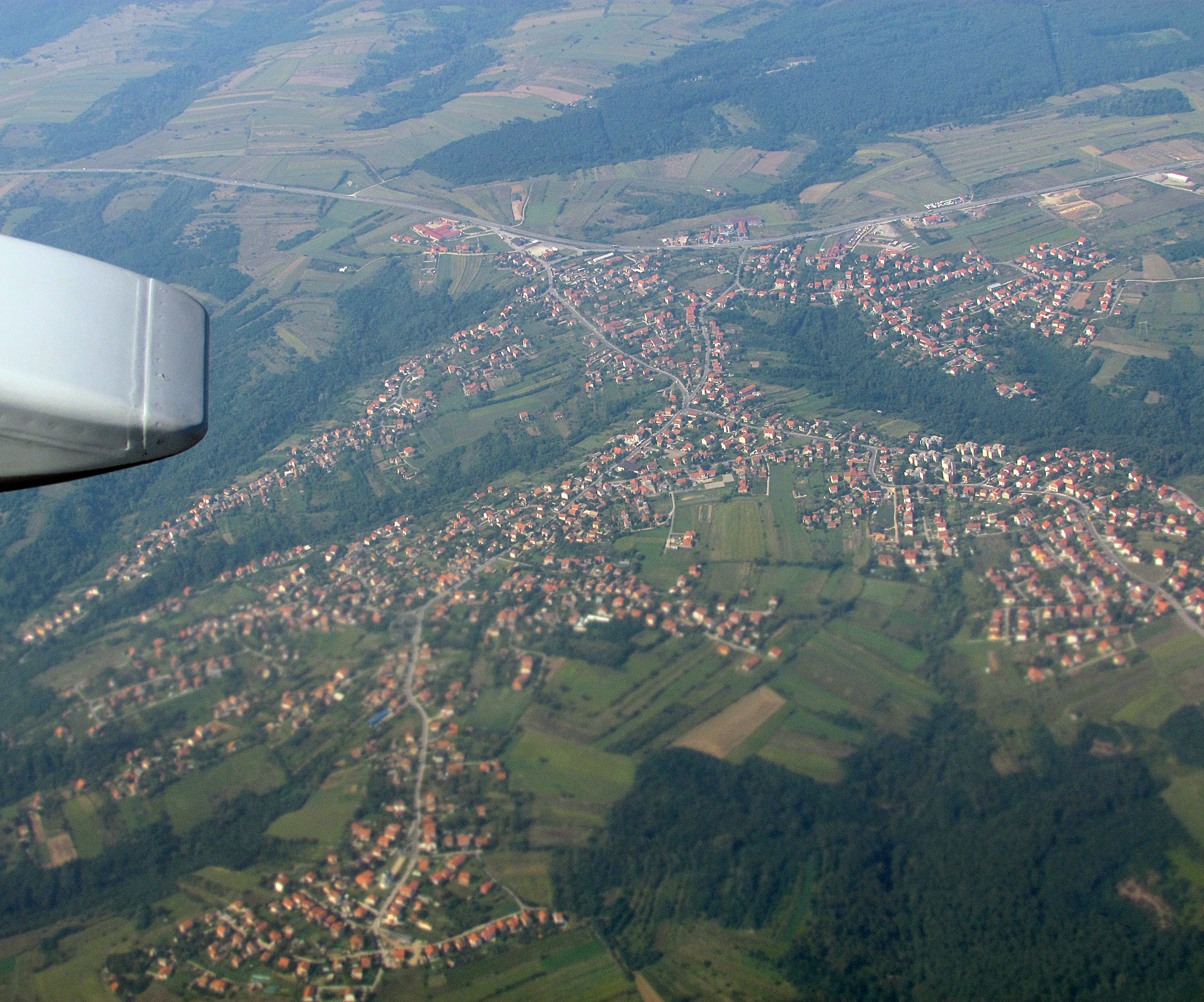
Rušanj

Rušanj (Serbian Cyrillic: Рушањ) is a suburban settlement of Belgrade, Serbia. It is located in the municipality of Čukarica.

Rušanj is located south of Belgrade, on the right side of the Ibarska magistrala freeway. It is located approximately 16 kilometres (10 mi) south of central Belgrade; the nearest neighbouring settlement is Resnik, about 2 km away. It is statistically classified as a rural settlement, which experienced accelerated growth in period 1970s-1990s. Population of Rušanj:

- 1971 - <2,000
- 1981 - 3,610
- 1991 - 4,457
- 2002 - 4,769
- 2011 - 4,821
- 2022 - 4,507

The settlement stretches in two forks, to the north and to the east, and each one is connected by separate bus lines (531 and 532) with downtown Belgrade. Rušanj has the school named "Aca Milosavljević" (named after a local WW2 soldier).
