= Labudovo Brdo =

Labudovo Brdo Лабудово брдо
- Urban neighbourhood
- Location within Belgrade
- Coordinates: 44°43′35″N 20°25′27″E
- Country: Serbia
- Region: Belgrade
- Municipality: Rakovica

Area
  - Total: 0.52 km^{2} (0.20 sq mi)
- Time zone: UTC+1 (CET)
  - Summer (DST): UTC+2 (CEST)
- Area code: +381(0)11
- Car plates: BG

Labudovo Brdo (Serbian Cyrillic: Лабудово брдо) is an urban neighborhood of Belgrade, the capital of Serbia. It is located in Belgrade's municipality of Rakovica.

== Location ==
Labudovo Brdo is located in the central part of the municipality, on the hill of the same name, and bordered by the municipalities of Rakovica on the north, Straževica on the west and Petlovo Brdo and Kijevo on the south. The neighborhood stretches from the street of the Liberation and the Topčiderka river on the east to the "Ibarska magistrala" on the west. The area is mostly residential, with some industrial facilities (Rudnik clothing factory) and a population of 11,647 in 2002.

The name of the hill and neighborhood, labudovo brdo, is Serbian for "swan's hill". The name of the hill appeared after 1950.

== Characteristics ==
The neighborhood is praised for its architectural design, as the "structure of higher order". It is described as the successful non-serial urban ensemble, similar to the neighborhood of Julino Brdo.

Large building of the elementary school "14th October" was built from 1976 to 1979, when it had 3,000 pupils. By 2022, that number fell to 1,300.
