= List of natural monuments in Belgrade =

List of the protected natural heritage on the administrative territory of Belgrade, the capital of Serbia.

== Protected areas ==
=== Landscapes of outstanding features ===
No.	Landscape of outstanding features	Native name	Est. (Note: The dates of original protection are preferred. Many natural monuments were later re-evaluated by the new laws which changed the conditions or shifted the jurisdiction. Hence, in some publications, those later dates are listed as the dates of establishment)	Municipalities	IUCN category	Area (km2)	Image	Coordinates
1	Avala	Авала	2007 (Note: Originally protected already in 1859. Declared a national park in 1936, demoted in 1946)	Voždovac	V	4.89		44.689962°N 20.51765°E
2	Kosmaj	Космај	2005	Mladenovac; Sopot	V	35.14		44.467971°N 20.575758°E
3	Great War Island	Велико ратно острво	2005	Zemun	IV	1.68		44.834062°N 20.44123°E

=== Natural monuments ===
No.	Natural monument	Native name	Est.	Municipalities	Type	IUCN category	Area (m2)	Image	Coordinates
1	Academic Park	Академски парк	2007	Stari Grad	botanical	III	14,590		44.819535°N 20.457866°E
2	Arboretum of the Forestry Faculty	Арборетум Шумарског факултета	2011	Čukarica	botanical	III	66,962		44.782277°N 20.423313°E
3	Beech in Dedinje	Буква на Дедињу	2008	Savski Venac	botanical	III	240		44.785464°N 20.449531°E
4	Bojčin forest	Бојчинска шума	2013	Surčin	botanical	III	6,707,932		44.742997°N 20.138369°E
5	Botanical garden Jevremovac	Ботаничка башта Јевремовац	1995	Stari Grad	botanical	III	48,183		44.815806°N 20.473222°E
6	Byford's forest (Note: Previously, and still better known as the Banjica forest (Бањичка шума))	Бајфордова шума	1993	Voždovac	botanical	III	400,802		44.766231°N 20.4744°E
7	Cedar tree	Стабло кедра	2001	Savski Venac	botanical	III	95		44.786047°N 20.44711°E
8	Chestnut in Dorćol	Кестен на Дорћолу	2013	Stari Grad	botanical	III	257		44.821422°N 20.464454°E
9	Cypress in Dedinje	Чемпрес на Дедињу	2006	Savski Venac	botanical	III	57		44.787799°N 20.455139°E
10	Forest Košutnjak	Шума Кошутњак	2014	Čukarica	botanical	III	2,652,598		44.76451°N 20.43668°E
11	Ginkgo in Vračar	Гинко на Врачару	2006	Vračar	botanical	III	102		44.798846°N 20.465393°E
12	Ginkgo tree	Стабло гинка	1998	Savski Venac	botanical	III	380		44.789817°N 20.437942°E
13	Grapevine in Zemun	Винова лоза у Земуну	2014	Zemun	botanical	III	230		44.844472°N 20.412072°E
16	Kalemegdan sandbank	Калемегдански рт	2021	Stari Grad	geological	II	140,718		44.822963°N 20.446433°E
14	Loess profile Kapela in Batajnica	Лесни профил Капела у Батајници	2014	Zemun	geological	III	54,174		44.926459°N 20.316982°E
15	Lipovica forest-Dugi Rt	Липовичка шума-Дуги рт	2013	Barajevo; Čukarica	botanical	III	2,416,768		44.653371°N 20.414874°E
17	Magnolia tree	Стабло магнолије	1998	Savski Venac	botanical	III	117		44.788951°N 20.449398°E
18	Maša's quarry (Note: Previously Senonian sandbank Maša's quarry (Сенонски спруд Машин мајдан))	Машин мајдан	1969	Savski Venac	geological	I	42,900		44.784602°N 20.437057°E
19	Miljakovac forest	Миљаковачка шума	2010	Rakovica	botanical	III	847,192		44.741379°N 20.454017°E
20	Miocene sandbank Tašmajdan	Миоценски спруд Ташмајдан	1968	Palilula	geological	III	24,600		44.810333°N 20.471294°E
21	Oak in Cvetni Trg	Храст на Цветном тргу	2001	Vračar	botanical	III	283		44.805541°N 20.46537°E
22	Oak in Mije Kоvačevića Street	Храст у Улици Мије Ковачевића	2014	Zvezdara	botanical	III	371		44.810331°N 20.491618°E
23	Obrenovac's Zabran	Обреновачки забран	2013	Obrenovac	botanical	III	477,718		44.666852°N 20.235233°E
24	Old plant specimens on Andrić Square and Kalemegdan (Note: European red beech (to 2010), pedunculate oak, koelreuteria (to 2017), Turkish hazel (procedure of stripping the protection started) - all in Kalemegdan; two Crimean limes - in Andrićev Venac (to 2014))	Стари примерци биљака на Андрићевом тргу и на Калемегдану	1981	Stari Grad	botanical	-	-		44.81991°N 20.45096°E
25	One European beech tree in Kalemegdan (Note: Procedure of stripping the protection started)	Једно стабло европске букве на Калемегдану	1983	Stari Grad	botanical	-	-		-
26	Pedunculate oak tree group at Jozić hut	Група стабала храста лужњака код Јозића колибе	1996	Obrenovac	botanical	III	1,625		44.602865°N 20.199464°E
27	Pioneers Park	Пионирски парк	2007	Stari Grad	botanical	III	36,013		44.810604°N 20.464248°E
28	Plane in Vračar	Платан на Врачару	2002	Vračar	botanical	III	485		44.798938°N 20.472699°E
29	Topčider park	Топчидерски парк	2015	Savski Venac	botanical	III	294,644		44.780562°N 20.441229°E
30	Three pedunculate oaks Bare	Три храста лужњака Баре	2006	Barajevo	botanical	III	5,000		44.567019°N 20.317774°E
31	Trees in Zemun Park (Note: Five yews, four Caucasian wingnuts, two ginkgos (to 2010), one sophora (to 2010), one blue spruce (to 2010), one Kentucky coffeetree (to 2010), one Judas tree (to 2010))	Стабла у Земунском парку	1991	Zemun	botanical	-	-		44.841704°N 20.410059°E
32	Two Cathedral Church's yews	Две тисе Саборне цркве	2005	Stari Grad	botanical	III	241		44.817959°N 20.451905°E
33	Two magnolias in Botićeva Street	Две магнолије у Ботићевој	2001	Savski Venac	botanical	III	60		44.786713°N 20.455089°E
34	Yew in Botićeva	Тиса у Ботићевој	2001	Savski Venac	botanical	III	50		44.786755°N 20.455053°E
35	Yew in Požeška Street	Тиса у Пожешкој улици	1981	Čukarica	botanical	III	103		44.783133°N 20.420343°E
36	Zemun's loess profile	Земунски лесни профил	2013	Zemun	geological	III	7,791		44.854453°N 20.398094°E
37	Zvezdara forest	Звездарска шума	2013	Zvezdara	botanical	III	808,757		44.803386°N 20.507613°E

=== Protected habitats ===
No.	Protected habitats	Native name	Est.	Municipalities	Level of protection	Area (km2)	Image	Coordinates
1	Fungi of Ada Ciganlija	Гљиве Аде Циганлије	2013	Čukarica	III	0.21		44.784167°N 20.380556°E
2	Veliko Blato	Велико блато	2016	Čukarica	III	2.94		44.857566°N 20.498188°E
3	Wintering site of the pigmy cormorant	Зимовалиште малог вранца	2022	Čukarica	III	0.23		44.799292°N 20.431137°E

== Internationally important areas ==
=== Ecologically important areas ===
The surroundings of some protected area are declared ecologically important areas, a wider, super-areas which may comprise more, territorially disconnected, singular protected areas. Together, they all form the proclaimed ecological network of Serbia, and are based on some internationally declared important areas.

No.	Ecologically important areas	Native name	Est.	Municipalities	Image	Including	Coordinates
1	Avala	Авала	2010	Grocka, Sopot, Voždovac		Outstanding natural landscape Avala, Emerald network Avala PC0000058, Prime butterfly area Avala 01	44.689962°N 20.51765°E
2	Kosmaj	Космај	2010	Mladenovac, Sopot		Outstanding natural landscape Kosmaj	44.467971°N 20.575758°E
3	Košutnjak	Кошутњак	2010	Čukarica, Rakovica		Natural monument Forest Košutnjak	44.76451°N 20.43668°E
4	Mouth of the Sava into the Danube	Ушће Саве у Дунав	2010	Čukarica, Palilula, Savski Venac, Zemun (extending into the City of Pančevo)		Outstanding natural landscape Great War Island, Protected habitat Wintering site of the pigmy cormorant, Natural monument Pančevo's Islands, Important Bird Area Mouth of the Sava into the Danube PC0171IBA	44.834062°N 20.44123°E

=== Internationally important ecological corridors ===
No.	Ecological corridors	Native name	Image
1	Danube river with its banks area	Река Дунав са обалским појасом	
2	Sava river with its banks area	Река Сава са обалским појасом	

== Future and former protected areas ==
=== Planned and proposed protected areas ===
Areas which have been surveyed for protection, are placed under the "preliminary protection". It means they are treated as being protected, until the protection is officially declared (in which case it continues), or rejected.

No.	Name	Native name	Type	Municipalities	Area (m2)	Image	Status	Coordinates
1	Ada Ciganlija	Ада Циганлија	landscape of outstanding features	Čukarica	4,510,000		declaration "planned for 2022"	44.788851°N 20.392601°E
2	Baba Velka's forest	Баба Велкина шума	natural monument	Voždovac, Zvezdara	1,050,000		decree adopted in 1970 but never took effect, being suppressed by the new law on forests	44.746417°N 20.536645°E
3	Bela Reka Lake	Језеро Бела река	natural monument	Čukarica, Voždovac	441,300		declaration "planned for 2022".	44.654034°N 20.460742°E
4	Belgrade	Београд	national park	Palilula; Zemun	-		proposed since 2015, with the Beljarica wetland being its core; no procedure started	44.905990°N 20.362968°E
5	Duboko	Дубоко	natural monument	Obrenovac	3,830,000		decree adopted in 1970 but never took effect, being suppressed by the new law on forests	44.656790°N 20.290637°E
6	Foreland of the left bank of Danube near Belgrade	Форланд леве обале Дунава код Београда	landscape of outstanding features	Palilula	18,580,541		registered, impending survey	44.905990°N 20.362968°E
7	Sremački Rt	Сремачки рт	natural monument	Čukarica	2,630,000		decree adopted in 1970 but never took effect, being suppressed by the new law on forests	44.693028°N 20.401915°E
8	Šuplja Stena	Шупља стена	natural monument	Voždovac	-		declaration "planned for 2022". Possible extension of the Avala landscape of outstanding features to encompass Šuplja Stena.	44.663420°N 20.539777°E
9	Tolinci	Толинци	protected habitat	Surčin	7,008,312		procedure began in 2016	44.770259°N 20.148052°E
10	Trešnja	Трешња	natural monument	Sopot, Voždovac	2,000,000		decree adopted in 1970 but never took effect, being suppressed by the new law on forests	44.605833°N 20.570475°E
11	Zemun Park	Земунски парк	natural monument	Zemun	-		declaration "planned for 2022".	44.841105°N 20.408897°E

=== Former protected natural heritage ===
No.	Name	Native name	Type	Municipalities	Area (m2)	Years	Image	Notes	Coordinates
1	Border oak tree in the Babe village	Стабло храста границе у селу Бабе	natural monument	Sopot	-	1965-1995		tree lost protection criteria	-
2	Eight trees in Pioneers park and one tree in Devojačka Street	Осам стабала у Пионирском парку и једно дрво у Девојачкој улици	natural monument	Stari Grad	-	1980-2007		in 2007 the entire Pioneers park, to which the trees belong, was declared a natural monument	44.810534°N 20.465145°E
3	Fir tree at 2 Augusta Cesarca Street (Note: Today Cara Iraklija)	Стабло јеле у Улици Аугуста Цесарца бр. 2	natural monument	Savski Venac	-	1949-2008		stripped of the status due to the physical destruction of the tree	44.784416°N 20.445076°E
4	Fir tree at 12 Andre Nikolića Street	Стабло јеле у Улици Андре Николића бр. 12	natural monument	Savski Venac	-	1949-2008		stripped of the status due to the physical destruction of the tree	44.789232°N 20.436496°E
5	Forest of pedunculate oak and common hornbeam at Hajdučka Česma in Košutnjak	Шума храста лужњака и граба код Хајдучке чесме у Кошутњаку	strict natural reserve	Čukarica	340	1981-2014		in 2014 the entire forest Košutnjak, to which the reserve belongs, was declared a natural monument	44.765975°N 20.43587°E
6	Forest of silver lime	Шума сребрне липе	strict natural reserve	Čukarica	-	1973-2014		in 2014 the entire forest Košutnjak, to which the reserve belongs, was declared a natural monument	44.778787°N 20.427191°E
7	Four hackberries trees and one red chestnut tree in Pioneers park	Четири стабла копривића и једно стабло црвеног кестена у Пионирском парку	natural monument	Stari Grad	-	1979-2007		in 2007 the entire Pioneers park, to which the trees belong, was declared a natural monument	44.810784°N 20.464623°E
8	Four Himalayan pine trees, one Pančić spruce tree, and one Japanese redwood tree at 23 Sanje Živanovića Street	Четири стабла хималајског бора, једно стабло Панчићеве оморике и једно стабло јапанске криптомерије у Улици Сање Живановића бр. 23	natural monument	Savski Venac	-	1949-19??		-	44.790153°N 20.433007°E
9	Geological-geographical layers at Kalemegdan locality	Геолошко-географски слојеви на локалитету Калемегдан	natural monument	Stari Grad	-	1969-2021		in 2021 merged into Kalemegdan sandbank natural monument	44.823080°N 20.447534°E
10	Himalayan cedar tree at the corner of Tolstojeva and Jovana Dinića streets	Стабло хималајског кедра на углу улица Толстојеве и Јована Динића	natural monument	Savski Venac	-	1949-2008		stripped of the status due to the physical destruction of the tree (tree dried)	44.784653°N 20.448122°E
11	Himalayan pine tree at 23 Temišvarska Street	Стабло хималајоског боровца у Темишварској улици бр. 23	natural monument	Savski Venac	-	2001-2013		tree lost protection criteria	44.790353°N 20.434104°E
12	Jakšić's chestnut in Senjak	Кестен Јакшића на Сењаку	natural monument	Savski Venac	94	2001-2010		stripped of the status due to the physical destruction of the tree	44.796219°N 20.445078°E
13	Lebanese cedar tree at 12 Andre Nikolića Street	Стабло либанског кедра у Улици Андре Николића бр. 12	natural monument	Savski Venac	-	1949-2008		stripped of the status due to the physical destruction of the tree	44.789232°N 20.436496°E
14	Lebanese cedar tree at 27 Andre Nikolića Street	Стабло либанског кедра у Улици Андре Николића бр. 27	natural monument	Savski Venac	-	1949-2008		stripped of the status due to the physical destruction of the tree	44.788898°N 20.433541°E
15	Maritime Neogene sandbank under the Pobednik monument at Kalemegdan	Морски неогенски спруд испод споменика Победнику на Калемегдану	natural monument	Stari Grad	500	1969-2021		in 2021 merged into Kalemegdan sandbank natural monument	44.823080°N 20.447534°E
16	Narrow-leaved ash tree - Šopići	Стабло лучког јасена - Шопићи	natural monument	Lazarevac	-	1965-2005		tree lost protection criteria	44.418192°N 20.263497°E
17	One fir tree at 25 Šekspirova Street	Једно стабло јеле у Шекспировој улици бр. 25	natural monument	Savski Venac	-	1949-2008		stripped of the status due to the physical destruction of the tree	44.782695°N 20.459833°E
18	One tsuga tree at 25 Šekspirova Street	Једно стабло цуге у Шекспировој улици бр. 25	natural monument	Savski Venac	-	1949-2008		stripped of the status due to the lost memorial values and properties (tree cut)	44.782695°N 20.459833°E
19	Paulownia tree in the "King Petar" elementary school's yard	Стабло пауловније у дворишту ОШ "Краљ Петар"	natural monument	Stari Grad	-	1979-2008		stripped of the status due to the lost memorial values and properties	44.818193°N 20.452812°E
20	Pedunculate oak tree - Pet Braće	Стабло храста лужњака - Пет браће	natural monument	Lazarevac	-	1965-2005		tree fell	44.418626°N 20.263561°E
21	Pedunculate oak - Melnice	Храст лужњак - Мелнице	natural monument	Sopot	-	1996-2008		stripped of the status due to the lost memorial values and properties	44.499193°N 20.545877°E
22	Plane at Residence of Prince Miloš	Платан код Милошевог конака	natural monument	Savski Venac	1,885	1979-2015		in 2015 the entire Topčider park, to which the tree belongs, was declared a natural monument	44.780769°N 20.442199°E
23	Red chestnut tree at the corner of the Vojvode Putnika and Vasilija Gaćeše streets	Стабло црвеног кестена на углу улица Војводе Путника и Василија Гаћеше	natural monument	Savski Venac	-	1981-2008		stripped of the status due to the physical destruction of the tree	44.790789°N 20.445408°E
24	Sophora tree in Academic park	Стабло софоре у Академском парку	natural monument	Stari Grad	-	1983-2007		in 2007 the entire Academic park, to which the tree belongs, was declared a natural monument then cut in 2008, while the log was conserved with sitting bench (made of the cut tree's wood) on top of it, and a commemorative plaque	44.819976°N 20.457542°E
25	Three Canadian hemlock trees and two sophora trees in Kalemegdan	Три стабла канадске цуге и два стабла софоре на Калемегдану	natural monument	Stari Grad	-	1983-2004		stripped of the status due to the lost memorial values and properties	-
26	Three fir trees and one pine tree (Note: Three balsam firs and one Mexican white pine at the corner of Andre Nikolića and Mihajla Davidovića)	Три стабла јеле и једно стабло бора	natural monument	Savski Venac	-	1949-2004		stripped of the status due to the physical destruction	44.789464°N 20.440425°E
27	Three hackberries	Три копривића	natural monument	Stari Grad	-	1979-2007		in 2007 the entire Pioneers park, to which the trees belong, was declared a natural monument	44.810466°N 20.464416°E
28	Three trees in Požeška Street (Note: Two yew trees, one Caucasian spruce tree; protection removed from Caucasian spruce and one yew in 2008, another yew continued with protection as Yew in Požeška Street)	Три стабла у Пошежкој улици	natural monument	Čukarica	-	1981-2008		stripped of the status due to the lost memorial values and properties	44.783040°N 20.419928°E
29	Tulip tree	Лалино дрво	natural monument	Savski Venac	-	1998-2014		stripped of the status due to the lost memorial values and properties, (tree dried and cut)	44.785292°N 20.460864°E
30	Twelve exotic trees and one Pančić spruce tree (Note: Three Greek firs, three giant sequoias, one Sikkim spruce, one Canadian hemlock, one Japanese cedar, one plum yew, one ginkgo, one bald cypress at 10 Mirka Tomića (today Sime Lozanića))	Дванаест стабала егзота и једног стабла Панчићеве оморике	natural monument	Savski Venac	-	1949-2004		trees stripped of the status due to the physical destruction	44.774006°N 20.463632°E
31	Two Atlas cedars and one Himalayan cedar tree	Два стабла атласког кедра и једно стабло хималајског кедра	natural monument	Savski venac	-	1979-2003		stripped of the status due to the lost memorial values and properties	44.773478°N 20.465211°E
32	Two black walnut trees in Manjež park	Два стабла црног ораха у парку Мањеж	natural monument	Savski Venac	-	1981-2008		one tree stripped of the status due to the lost memorial values and properties, the other one because of the physical destruction	44.804468°N 20.464104°E
33	Two false cypress trees and larch tree (Note: at 8 Augusta Cesarca (today Cara Iraklija))	Два стабла хамеципариса и стабло ариша	natural monument	Savski Venac	-	1949-2004		trees stripped of the status due to the physical destruction	44.782527°N 20.447757°E
34	Two Himalayan pine trees	Два стабла хималајског боровца	natural monument	Savski Venac	202	2001-2023		stripped of the status due to the lost memorial values and properties; one was damaged by the wind and snow, so its top was cut off, the other had to be truncated for safety reasons	44.791691°N 20.432367°E
35	Two Pančić spruce trees at 21 Maglajska Street	Два стабла Панчићеве оморике у Маглајској улици бр. 21	natural monument	Savski Venac	-	1949-2008		one tree stripped of the status due to the lost memorial values and properties, the other one because of the physical destruction (both trees dried)	44.786095°N 20.460334°E
36	Two tsuga trees at 2 Augusta Cesarca Street	Два стабла цуге у Улици Аугуста Цесарца бр. 2	natural monument	Savski Venac	-	1949-2008		stripped of the status due to the physical destruction of the trees	44.784416°N 20.445076°E

== Notes ==
Notes:
