= Messerschmitt Bf 109 in Yugoslav service =

Bf 109 in Yugoslav service

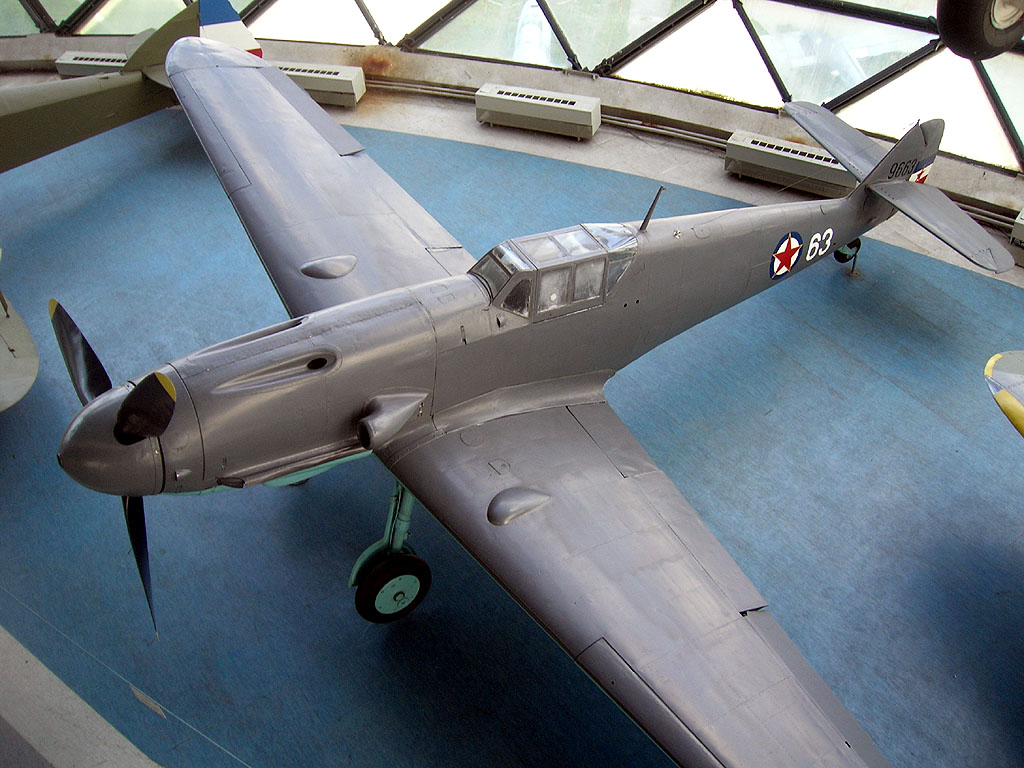
- A Messerschmitt Bf 109G-2 at the Museum of Aviation in Belgrade

General information
- Type: Fighter
- Manufacturer: Messerschmitt
- Primary user: 2nd Fighter Regiment; 6th Fighter Regiment

History
- In service: 1939–1941

The Royal Yugoslav Air Force (VVKJ) operated the German Messerschmitt Bf 109E-3 fighter aircraft from August 1939 to April 1941. During that period, the VVKJ obtained 73 Messerschmitt Bf 109E-3s from Germany, marking the second-largest export sale of the model. When the country was drawn into World War II by the German-led Axis invasion of April 1941, a total of 46 Yugoslav Messerschmitt Bf 109E-3s were serviceable. They achieved some successes against Luftwaffe aircraft, but all Yugoslav Messerschmitt Bf 109E-3s were destroyed or captured during the 11-day invasion.

During World War II, the Yugoslav Partisans captured ten Messerschmitt Bf 109s. These small numbers were boosted by a 1947 agreement with Bulgaria, under which Yugoslavia eventually received about 120 G and K models to help equip the fledgling Yugoslav Air Force. Due to lack of spare parts, all Yugoslav Bf 109s were withdrawn from service in 1954.

== Acquisition ==
In 1938, the VVKJ began modernising its fleet of aircraft. Following protracted negotiations, it ordered 50 Messerschmitt Bf 109E-3 fighter aircraft from Nazi Germany. This was followed by a further order of 50 aircraft. Between August 1939 and late 1940, a total of 73 aircraft were delivered under these contracts. This was the second-largest foreign purchase of the E variant of the fighter, after Switzerland.

== Operational service ==
=== Royal Yugoslav Air Force ===
Once in service, the Bf 109E-3s were used to equip the 31st Fighter Group of the 2nd Fighter Regiment based at Knić, and the 32nd and 51st Fighter Groups of the 6th Fighter Regiment based at Prnjavor and Zemun, both on the outskirts of Belgrade. The Bf 109E-3 was also operated by the 702nd Liaison Squadron of the 1st Fighter Brigade based at Zemun, and the Independent Fighter Squadron of the 81st Bomber Group and the Air Training School, both based at Mostar. All of these aircraft were deployed in the fighter/interceptor role. Immediately prior to the German-led Axis invasion of Yugoslavia in April 1941, 64–65 of the original 73 Bf 109E-3s were serviceable. They were allocated as follows:

Allocation of Messerschmitt Bf 109E-3 aircraft, 6 April 1941
Formation	Unit	Location	Aircraft	Notes
1st Fighter Brigade	702nd Liaison Squadron	Zemun	2	—
2nd Fighter Regiment	31st Fighter Group	Knić	19	101st and 141st Squadrons
6th Fighter Regiment	32nd Fighter Group	Prnjavor	27–28	103rd, 104th and 142nd Squadrons
6th Fighter Regiment	51st Fighter Group	Zemun	10	102nd Squadron
—	81st Bomber Group	Mostar	3	Independent Fighter Squadron
—	Air Training School	Mostar	3	—

Commencing at 06:45 on 6 April, the Luftwaffe launched Operation Retribution, a series of concerted bombing attacks on Belgrade that coincided with air and ground attacks throughout the country. Several waves of German aircraft approached Belgrade during the day, initially Junkers Ju 87 "Stuka" dive-bombers escorted by fighters. All of the Bf 109E-3s of the 51st Fighter Group scrambled to meet the first onslaught, and they were soon joined by the Messerschmitts of 32nd Fighter Group. Seven claims were made by the pilots of the 102nd Squadron of the 51st Fighter Group, losing five aircraft in return. The 32nd Fighter Group Messerschmitts claimed another four bombers for the loss of two of their own, although several more Yugoslav fighters were hit and damaged. During the initial melee, Yugoslav anti-aircraft guns had fired at the Yugoslav Messerschmitts as well as the German ones, unable to distinguish between them.

=== Yugoslav Air Force ===
In October 1944, advancing Partisan forces captured eight Bf 109Gs at Kovin, which were supplemented by more Bf 109s in May 1945. Some of these aircraft were made airworthy and pressed into service, flying sorties against Chetnik forces in Bosnia in early May 1945 and against Croat forces in Posavina late that month. They saw little use after the end of the fighting, and were scrapped in 1947. In 1947, Bulgaria realised that it had a surplus of aircraft above what would be allowed by the Paris Peace Treaties, and rather than scrap them, it was decided that they would be transferred to Yugoslavia, reinforcing the newly established Jugoslovensko Ratno Vazduhoplovstvo (JRV) or Yugoslav Air Force. An initial delivery of 48 dismantled Bf 109s was made in March 1947, and in July that year agreement was made to transfer another 43 Bf 109s, with 12 aircraft being converted to two-seaters. (Note: These two seaters had several differences from the Messerschmitt designed G-12 conversion.) In 1949, political disagreements between Yugoslavia and the Soviet Union (known as the Tito–Stalin split) caused deliveries from Bulgaria to be stopped after 53 single-seaters (known as Me 109s rather than Bf 109s in JRV service) and six two seaters (designated UMe 109s) had been received. Three more single-seaters were converted to UMe 109 trainers in 1951.

The Me 109s equipped the 83rd IAP (Iovacki Avio Puk - fighter regiment) and the 172nd IAP. Both units suffered high accident rates, and by the end of 1951, operational strength had dropped to 26 single-seaters and 7 two seaters. In 1952, Yugoslavia received large numbers of Republic F-47D Thunderbolts from the United States, together with extensive stocks of spares, and this allowed the Messerschmitts to be replaced that year, with the aircraft going into storage. They were scrapped in 1955.

== Surviving examples ==
Two ex-JRV Bf 109Gs survived the retirement and scrapping of Yugoslavia's Bf 109s:

- Bf 109G-2 Werknummer 14792: Built at Wiener Neustadter Flugzeugwerk (WNF) in January 1943. Service with JRV from December 1948. Displayed at Aeronautical Museum Belgrade since 1961 and displayed as 'White 63'.
- Bf 109G-10 Werknummer 610937: Built at WNF in January 1945. To JRV in March 1947. To faculty of Mechanical Engineering, Belgrade 1952 and sold to US 1986.
