= Toranj =

Toranj means tower in Serbo-Croatian languages and Bergamot in Persian. It may refer to:

- Avalski toranj (sr), Avala Tower in Belgrade, Serbia
- Toranj, Pakrac, a village near Pakrac, Croatia
- Toranj, Velika, a village near Velika, Croatia
- Toranj (album), Mohsen Namjoo's 2007 debut
