= Monument to Soviet War Veterans, Avala =

Coordinates: 44°41′18.9″N 20°30′50.3″E

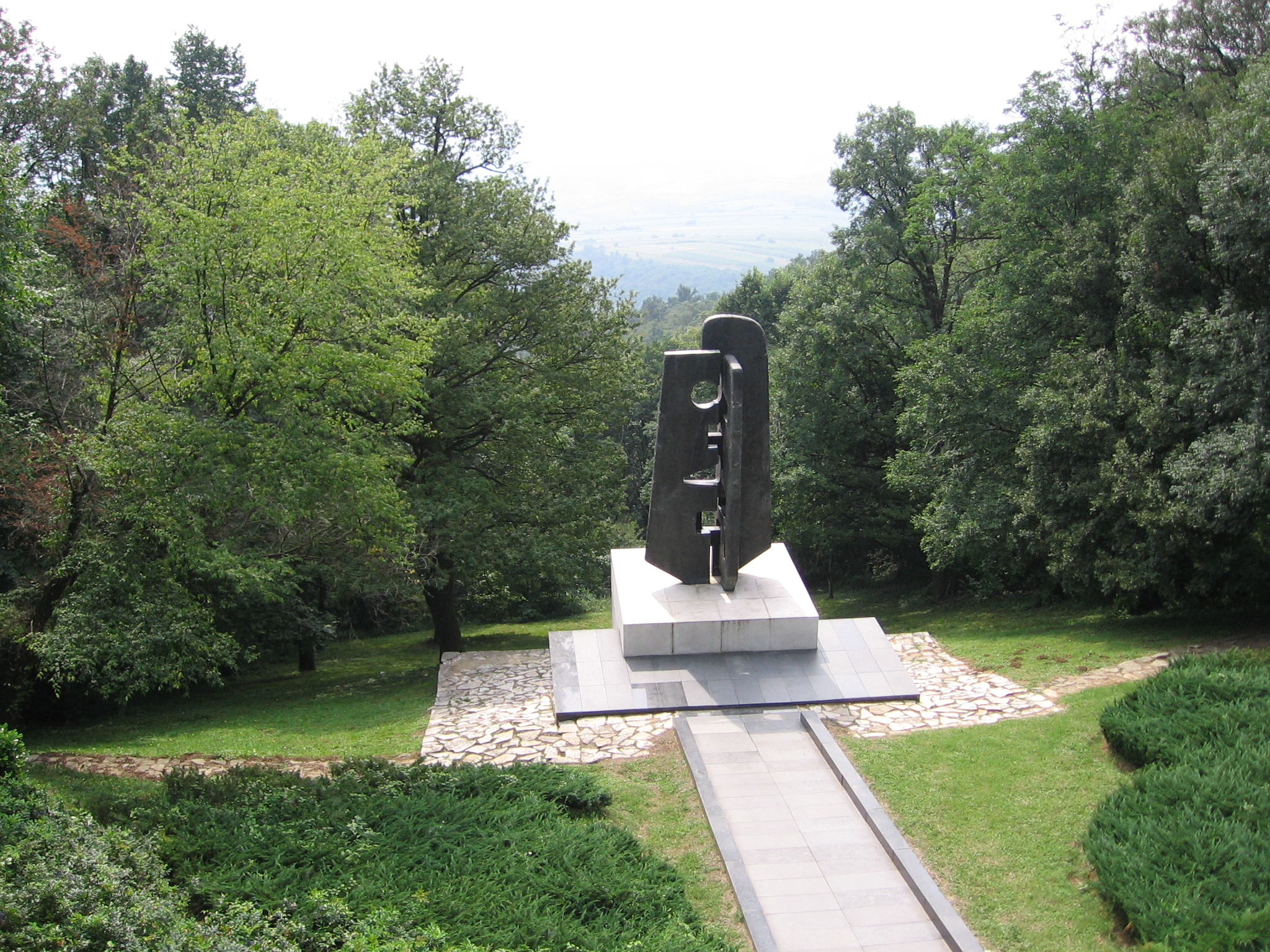
Monument viewed from the road.

Monument to the Soviet War Veterans is a monument located on the Avala mountain near Belgrade, Serbia. It is dedicated to members of the Soviet military delegation who were killed in an airplane crash on the Avala on October 19, 1964. The delegation was flying to Belgrade to attend the celebration of the 20th anniversary of the Liberation of Belgrade on October 20, 1944, since Red Army forces had taken part in the liberation. In the plane crash, Marshal Sergey Semyonovich Biryuzov and general Vladimir Ivanovich Zhdanov were notably killed, among others.

The Monument was sculptured by Jovan Kratohvil.

In October 2024, it was restored with funding from Lukoil Serbia.

== See also ==
- Monument to the Unknown Hero
- Avala TV Tower
