= Bela Reka Lake =

Artificial lake in Ripanj, Serbia

Bela Reka Bela reka / Бела река
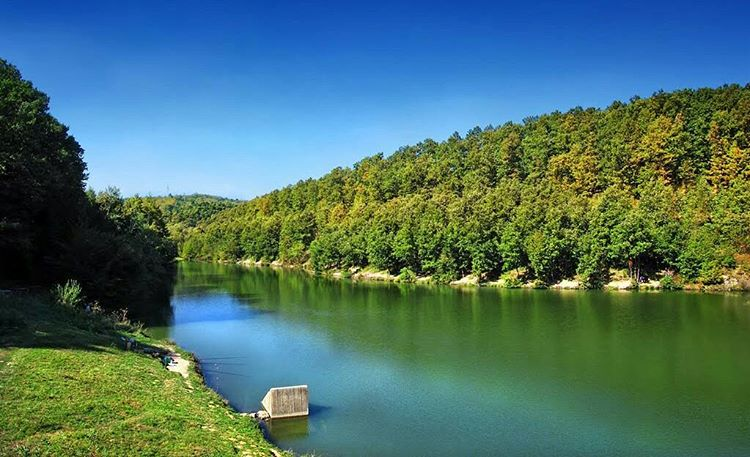

- Location within Serbia
- Location: Ripanj, Belgrade, Serbia
- Coordinates: 44°39′15″N 20°27′39″E
- Type: artificial
- Primary inflows: Bela Reka
- Primary outflows: Bela Reka
- Basin countries: Serbia
- Max. length: 410 m (1,350 ft)
- Max. width: 102 m (335 ft)
- Surface area: 2.16 ha (5.3 acres)
- Average depth: 6 m (20 ft)
- Max. depth: 10 m (33 ft)
- Surface elevation: 200 m (660 ft)
- Islands: none
- Settlements: Bela Reka neighborhood

Bela Reka (Serbian Cyrillic: Бела река), is an artificial lake in Ripanj, a suburb of Belgrade, the capital of Serbia. It was created in 1988 on the stream of the same name, as part of a project to prevent floods on the territory of Belgrade. In time it became a popular fishing location and in 2021 survey began to judge lake's declaration as a natural monument due to its undisturbed nature.

== Location ==
The lake is located some 30 km (19 mi) south of downtown Belgrade. Administratively, it belongs to the Belgrade's municipality of Voždovac, in municipality's southern section. It is situated in the northwest part of the suburban village of Ripanj, and west of its Bela reka hamlet.

== Geography ==
The lake is located in the valley of the northeast oriented Bela reka creek, a left tributary of the Topčiderka, which flows into it at another Ripanj's neighborhood, Kolonija. The lake also receives water from two water wells, which are now submerged. Valley locality in which the lake was formed is called Beli Kamen. The lake is entirely surrounded with forests. To the north stretches Duboka Jaruga geographic locality, extending into another Belgrade's municipality, Čukarica. Localities of Lekino Brdo, Turski Rt and Cerak are to the southwest, south and southeast, respectively, in the direction of the Ripanj's section of the Lipovica weekend settlement.

West of the lake is the 295 m (968 ft) high pass Karaula on the European route E763. East of the lake are the neighborhood of the same name, and the abandoned facilities of the Minel factory. Locality Otavice is to the northeast. The entire valley is an extension of the southwest slopes of the Avala mountain. The water temperature during summer is 16 to 20 °C (61 to 68 °F). In spring and summer it falls to 8 to 10 °C (46 to 50 °F), while during the winter the 30 to 40 cm (12 to 16 in) thick ice forms on the lake surface, which can last for 2 to 3 months.

The lake is at an elevation of 200 m (660 ft). It is 410 m (1,350 ft) long and up to 102 m (335 ft) wide. Maximum depth is 10 m (33 ft), while the average is 6 m (20 ft). The area of the lake is 2.16 ha (5.3 acres). Bela Reka belongs to the group of central Serbian Šumadija lakes.

== History ==
The lake was formed in 1988, when the Bela Reka creek was dammed. The dam was built as part of the project to prevent torrential floods caused by the smaller streams and creeks in the wider Belgrade area. In this specific location, the creek was often flooded houses and the nearby railway, especially at the end of winter, when snow would melt on the Avala mountain and surrounding hills, and during rainy spring seasons.

== Wildlife ==
The lake and the surrounding forests are important for natural life. The area is a location of endangered and rare types of habitats, ecosystems and autochthonous wild species, both at national and international level. It allows for undisturbed nesting, spawning and care for the young.

There are 213 recorded plant species around the lake of which 20 are protected wild species. There are 41 species of mushrooms, including two protected, green-cracking russula and charcoal burner.

Three separate habitats of protected beetles are located: European stag beetle, beech longhorn beetle and Nastas' ground beetle. The first two are internationally important as their habitats are dwindling in Europe. Habitat of stag beetle at Bela Reka is one of the largest in Serbia. Protected butterfly large white, also lives at the lake.

In the lake live 13 species of fish. They include gudgeon, northern pike, common roach, common bleak, common carp, wels catfish, grass carp, zander, European chub, Prussian carp, European perch, common bream and common rudd. During the winter, if the ice crust forms on the surface, the holes are being drilled to help fish survive. The fish population is regularly restocked.

The area is favorable for the reproduction of amphibians and reptiles. They include common wall lizard, dice snake and Caspian whipsnake. There are also 38 species of birds. Forests are inhabited by 27 species of mammals, including hazel dormouse, forest dormouse, otter, various bats, roe deer, hare and wild boar.

== Protection ==
Institute for the environment protection tests the lake water every two weeks, controlling its chemical and bacterial quality. The lake is considered one of the Šumadija lakes with cleanest water.

Despite the general good maintenance of the lake, there were attempts at creating illegal dump sites or building illegal structures at the lake. A citizens group "Bela Reka" was formed to protect the lake and at their initiative, the institute conducted a survey of the lake in 2021–2022, concluding that it satisfies conditions for protection. The study was sent to the city and government bodies, and in April 2022 it was publicly announced that plans are to declare Bela Reka a natural monument by the end of 2022. This was then postponed for 2023.

The planned protected area will cover 44.13 ha (109.0 acres), forming a forested buffer zone between the municipalities of Voždovac and Čukarica.

== Tourism ==
Bela Reka became a popular fishing spot. The catch is limited to 5 kg (11 lb) per fisherman daily. The fishing association "Ripanj", founded in 1996, administers the lake. Fishing is forbidden only in winter. The gamekeeping service is organized at the lake. In one section the searchlights are placed, allowing for the night fishing. Commercial fishing is not allowed, and for the recreational fishing a legal licence is needed.

Near the dam is an unregulated beach. The lake was used for swimming, but after several drownings since the 2000s, including a boy who drowned in 2006, swimming was forbidden. Still, swimmers gather during the summer season illegally. Some diving clubs use the lake for training sessions.

Lake's surrounding area is arranged as an excursion site. The former mine shaft in the vicinity was adapted and is being used for the parties.

The lake is accessible via the old road to Ralja. The public bus line No. 407 connects Bela Reka with Voždovac's urban neighborhood of Trošarina. The railway passes close to the lake, but there is no station. The railway here enters the tunnel, which it exits at Nenadovac in the Barajevo municipality.
