= Uglješa Bogunović =

Serbian architect

- Угљеша Богуновић
- Born: October 22, 1922; Teslić, Yugoslavia (now Bosnia and Herzegovina)
- Died: April 27, 1994 (aged 71); Belgrade, Serbia
- Notable work

Uglješa Bogunović (1922–1994) was a Serbian architect, among Belgrade's and the country's most prominent.

Bogunović was born on 1922 in Teslić, Yugoslavia (now Bosnia and Herzegovina).

One of his most famous works, in collaboration with architects Slobodan Janjić and Milan Kostić, is the Mount Avala TV Tower that was destroyed in the NATO bombing of Yugoslavia. His other works include the reconstruction of Skadarlija Street in the 1960s and the Yugoslav Pavilion at the World Trade Fair in San Francisco in 1964.

Begunović died in 1994 in Belgrade.

Begunović's work was included in the show Toward a Concrete Utopia: Architecture in Yugoslavia, 1948–1980 at New York's MoMA in 2016.
