= Šuplja Stena =

Coordinates: 44°40′12″N 20°32′36″E

Šuplja Stena (Serbian Cyrillic: Шупља Стена) is a suburban settlement of Belgrade, the capital of Serbia. It is located in Belgrade's municipality of Voždovac.

== Location ==
Šuplja Stena is located in the woods of the Avala mountain, 22 kilometers south from downtown Belgrade. Located right on the mountain's wind rose, the place has a beneficial effect on human health, especially for the respiratory system.

== Characteristics ==
Šuplja Stena is a non-residential, recreational complex which in the period of two decades (1970–90) grew into one of the most popular children resorts, mostly for the group vacations organized by the Belgrade's elementary schools. During holiday seasons, the complex was known for hosting several thousand children.

The complex covers and area of 12 hectares and includes 2 buildings, 14 bungalows, 3 open swimming pools, soccer, basketball and volleyball fields, etc. The name of the place, šuplja stena, is Serbian for "hollow rock". The complex also includes a part of the Avala forest, with 1,200 pines and numerous oaks.

In April 2022, it was announced that plans are to declare Šuplja Stena a natural monument by the end of 2022. Also, there is a possibility that the already protected landscape of the outstanding features Avala may be extended, to encompass Šuplja Stena.

== History ==
The complex was built in the early 1970s by the municipal assembly of Belgrade's central municipality of Vračar. Originally, due to the healing effect of the wind rose, Šuplja Stena was planned as an air spa for the rehabilitation of the children with respiratory problems. It was operational until 1992 when Serbian government designated the place as a shelter for the refugees from Croatia and Bosnia and Herzegovina, after the outbreak of the Yugoslav wars. In 2003 the last refugees left Šuplja Stena but the devastated complex remained inactive until February 2012.

Šuplja Stena became an object of bitter dispute between the municipality of Vračar and the Serbian state owned forestry company, "Srbijašume". "Srbijašume", which owns the lot but not the complex, claimed that the municipality is mismanaging the complex and asked the Republic's Directory for Properties to alienate the facilities from the municipality and that they offered to do reconstruction with their own funds, but that municipality rejected them. Municipality responded that they have absolutely no intention of giving away the complex they built to "Srbijašume" without any compensation and asked (already in 2002, with a proper offer) to buy the lot, too, because they do not wish to reconstruct Šuplja Stena so that it could be given to someone else, claiming that after 1997 the complex was left ruined and became a gathering place for drug addicts and vagrants. However, the government in 2006 refused to sell the lot to the municipality. The subject was brought to the public attention by the series of articles in newspapers, and in 2007 Vračar officially took over Šuplja Stena again. In February 2012, the reconstruction of one third of the complex was finished and it was open for children.
