= Ripanj =

Ripanj Рипањ
- Suburban neighbourhood
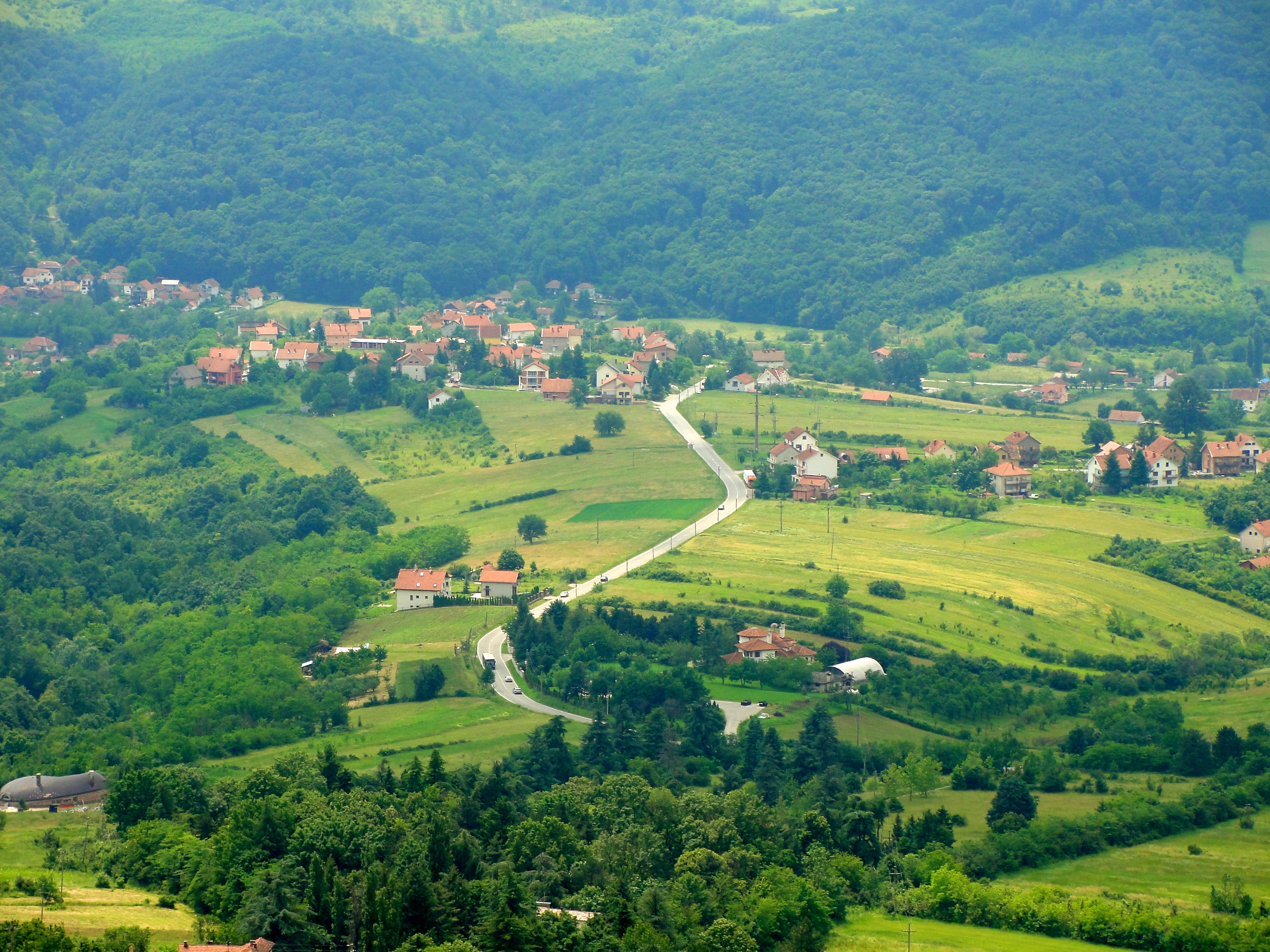

- Location within Serbia
- Coordinates: 44°38′N 20°31′E
- Country: Serbia
- Region: Belgrade
- Municipality: Voždovac

Area
  - Total: 79.70 km^{2} (30.77 sq mi)

Population (2011)
  - Total: 11,018
  - Density: 138.2/km^{2} (358.0/sq mi)
- Time zone: UTC+1 (CET)
  - Summer (DST): UTC+2 (CEST)
- Postal code: 11232
- Area code: +381(0)11
- Car plates: BG

Ripanj (Serbian Cyrillic: Рипањ) is a suburban settlement of Belgrade, Serbia. It is located in Belgrade's municipality of Voždovac. It has a distinction of being "the largest village of Serbia" taking in account its number of population, but also because it has the largest area of all rural settlements in the country.

== Location ==
Ripanj is located some 25 kilometers south of Belgrade, on the southern slopes of the Avala mountain, in the valley of the Topčiderka river. It is the southernmost settlement in the municipality, on the northern side of the Lipovica woods, near the tripoint of the municipalities of Voždovac, Barajevo and Sopot.

== History ==
It is believed that settlement got its name from the large rock in the vicinity, called Ripa. Slopes of the Avala were already inhabited in Neolithic. The location is an old mining area as it is known that already Romans were extracting mercury and silver and the tradition was later continued by the medieval Saxon miners. One of the major Serbian industrialists in the early 20th century, Đorđe Vajfert, also owned several mining fields. The mercury extraction from the Avala mountain ended in the second half of the 20th century.

The village got its first school in 1824, the same year when the first church was built. The small, wooden church (crkva-brvanara) was later replaced with the large Church of the Holy Trinity in 1892.

There was a spring of mineral water in the village. The water was sour (kisela voda). It was located in the Tupovac locality which doesn't exist anymore. The spring was recorded in the 1892 papers published by the state government.

== Administration ==
Ripanj used to be a separate municipality which originally comprised only the village of Ripanj. It had a population of 7,475 in 1948 and 8,255 in 1953. In 1956, Brđani and Bošnjaci were detached from the settlement of Ripanj into separate settlements, but within the municipality. Ripanj was then annexed to the municipality of Voždovac, but if it had continued to exist it would have a population of 10,533 in 1961 and 10,673 in 1971. Brđani, in 1977, and Bošnjaci, in 1979, were abolished as a separate statistical entities, becoming part of the village of Ripanj again, which, since then corresponds to the area and population of the former municipality.

== Population ==
Ripanj is still statistically classified as a rural settlement (village). The population has been stagnating for the last several decades, according to the official censuses of population:

- 1863 - 1,839
- 1921 - 5,012
- 1948 - 7,475
- 1953 - 8,255
- 1961 - 7,610 (settlement); 10,533 (ex-municipal)
- 1971 - 7,873 (settlement); 10,673 (ex-municipal)
- 1981 - 10,463
- 1991 - 10,320
- 2002 - 10,741
- 2011 - 11,088

== Characteristics ==
Ripanj is still largely an agricultural settlement. The electrotechnics factory "Elektrosrbija" is located in Ripanj, as are the three "Minel" factory departments.

Ripanj is located in the northern, low Šumadija and the neighboring plateau is named after the settlement (Ripanj plateau), south of the Pinosava plateau. A railway Belgrade-Niš (both parallel lines) passes next to the settlement and the tunnel south of Ripanj is named the "Ripanj tunnel".

A former mine, Crveni Breg ("Red Hill"), is located in the northernmost section of Ripanj. Lead, zinc, silver and gold were extracted from the Roman period until 1953, when the mine was closed. It has seven levels, out of which four are flooded, and the stalactites are being formed inside. By 2009, the upper level was prepared fort visitors, being cleaned and lighted for some 300 m (980 ft) but the project of turning it into a tourist attraction failed.

Ripanj is location of the closed Tešićev Majdan ("Tešić Quarry"). The stone pit was privately owned, but was confiscated by the state after World War II and stopped operating before 1960. In the process of the restitution after 2000, the quarry was returned to the surviving owners, but they live abroad so the quarry is still not operational. It is the only known location of kersantite in Serbia, a worldwide rare type of greenish granite. For decades, kersantite was used for the Belgrade buildings, including some of the most representative ones. Features built with this stone include the fountain between the Novi Dvor and Stari Dvor, bordure of the Hotel Bristol, Small Staircase in Kalemegdan Park, pedestal of the Play of Black Horses statues in front of the House of the National Assembly of Serbia and buildings of Belgrade Cooperative, Elementary School King Petar I, Cathedral Church of St. Michael the Archangel and Main Post Office Building. As the buildings began to deteriorate in time, city authorities showed interest in the quarry, not only for the repairs but also for the future construction. For now, when some deteriorated kersantine feature has to be replaced, the artificial stone is used (as in the case of the pedestal of the Play of Black Horses). Geologists suggested to the city to obtain the ownership over the land on which the pit is located and to reopen it. City government announced in 2012 that it will unilaterally explore the pit until it gets reopened and inspected it in 2013. They found still existing large amounts of already cut kersantite and that locals illegally extract the stone and crush it to cover the roads with it. After the political change in Belgrade in the late 2013, the motion was dropped.

In the hamlet od Drobnjaci, there is a new monastery dedicated to the Bogorodica Trojeručica. Construction began in 2012 and the foundations were consecrated on 1 April 2015. Monastery is built from wood and since 2016 it hosts a copy of the Bogorodica Trojeručica icon, sent from the Hilandar monastery on Mount Athos. Within the complex, the log church was built from 2013 to 2017. Walls are made of silicate bricks, coated with white pine wood. The church covers 100 m^{2} (1,100 sq ft) and contains two thrones made of cooked walnut wood. Both host icons, of the Bogorodica Trojeručica, and of Saint Maria Gatchinska.

One of only three officially designated campsites in Belgrade by 2018 is located in Ripanj. A small camping ground, it is situated on the slopes in the Avala mountain.

== Boroughs ==
As a large and elongated settlement, stretched along the road and railway (there are five railway stations within the Ripanj area), it developed outer boroughs or comprised the formerly separate settlements. Some of the largest are:

- Bela Reka, north-west of downtown Ripanj; itself, sub-part of Kolonija and location of the Bela Reka artificial lake, created on the creek of the same name in 1988; the lake also receives water from two wells which are now submerged. The lake is located 23 km (14 mi) south of downtown Belgrade. Average depth is 6 m (20 ft) and the summer water temperature is about 20 °C (68 °F), but after 2006, when a boy drowned in the lake, the swimming is forbidden. Surrounding area is adapted as an excursion site with the former mine shaft in the vicinity used for the parties. The lake is a popular fishing spot as it is inhabited with common carp, wels catfish, grass carp, zander, European chub and Prussian carp. The catch is limited to 5 kg (11 lb) per fisherman daily. In April 2022, it was announced that plans are to declare Bela Reka lake a natural monument by the end of 2022.
- Bela Zemlja, east;
- Bošnjaci, south-west; in 1956-79 detached from Ripanj as a separate settlement with a population of 881 in 1961 and 742 in 1971; from detachment to 1959 officially named Bošnjaci-Stublovi;
- Brđani, south-east; in 1956-77 detached from Ripanj as a separate settlement with a population of 2,042 in 1961 and 2,058 in 1971.
- Čaršija, on the foothills of the Avala, it is a location of an archeological site The most important artefact from this Neolithic find is the "Ripanj statuette", a female deity, dated to 4th or 3rd millennium B.C., represented as sitting on a throne. Figurine is made of terra cotta, 16 centimeters high and missing head, arms and feet.
- Drobnjaci;
- Kablar, informal settlement, mostly inhabited by the Romani people. In June 2008 old shacks were replaced with the new mobile homes and water and sewage systems were introduced;
- Kolonija; The Minel factory is stationed here. The football club FC Minel is also located here.
- Prnjavor, east of Bela Zemlja; it had an estimated population of over 1,000 in 2017;
- Stepašinovac;
- Stražarija;

=== Trešnja ===
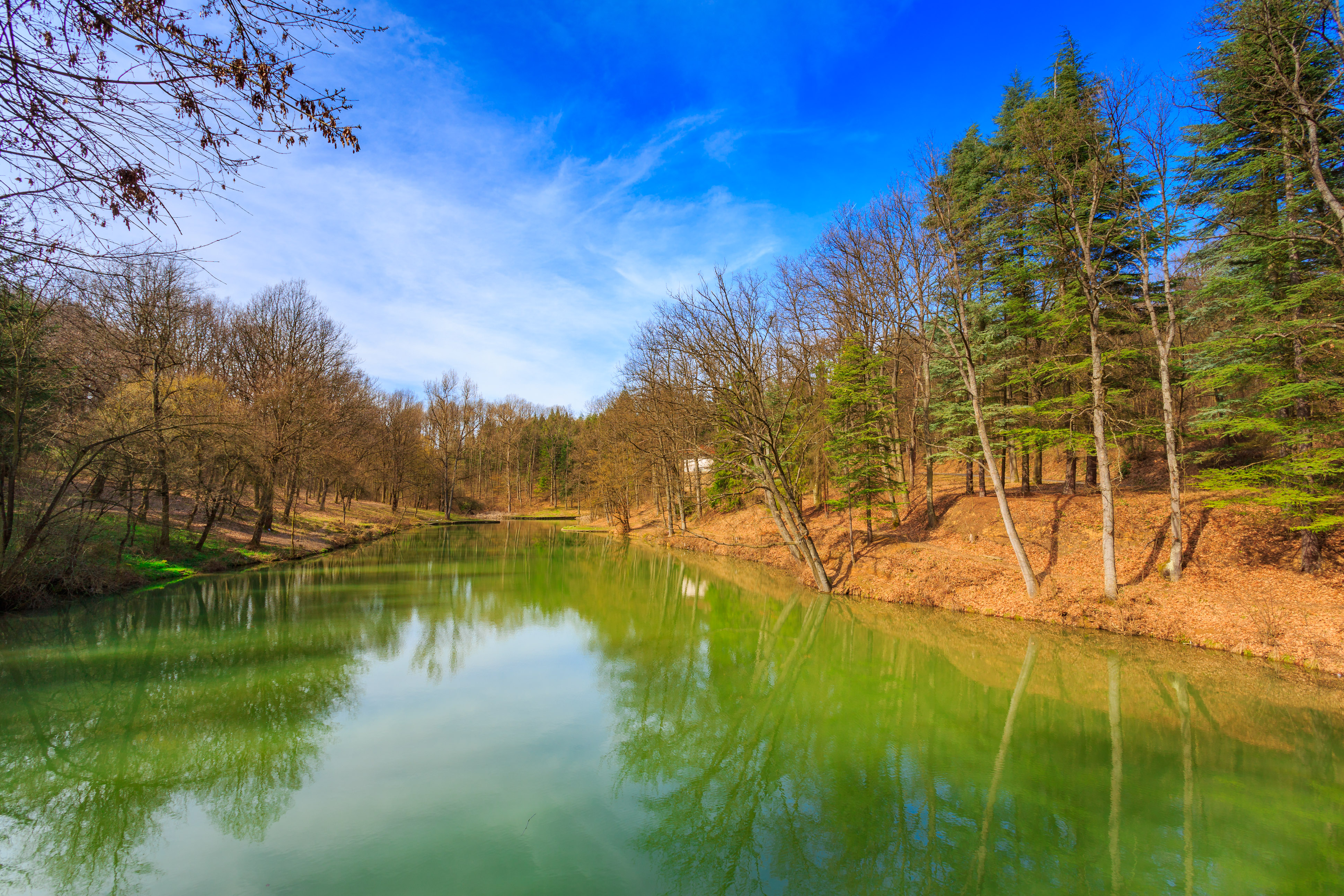
Lake Trešnja

Trešnja is the easternmost settlement of Ripanj, a popular picnic area located north of the Ralja river, on the northern slopes of the 310 m (1,020 ft) high Koviona hill, along the Belgrade-Kragujevac road. It is 32 km (20 mi) south-east of Belgrade and closer to Vrčin in the municipality of Grocka than to Ripanj and the village of Mala Ivanča is just south of it. Parts of the settlement, forest and the lake belong to Mala Ivanča in the municipality of Sopot. It is located in the afforested valley, rich in big game (mouflon, roe deer, fallow deer), which was turned into an official fenced hunting ground which spreads between the altitudes of 200 to 300 m (660 to 980 ft). The surrounding area, which covers an area of 117 ha (290 acres), comprises a small artificial pond, two cold water springs, a restaurant, weekend-settlement and a car camping park. The pond is 150 m (490 ft) long, 30 m (98 ft) wide and up to 5 m (16 ft) deep and populated with the Prussian carp, common carp and asp. One side of the lake is surrounded with the oak wood and the other with the conifers. Popular among the visitors in the 1970s and 1980s, Trešnja is largely neglected today. A motel on the shore was burned in a fire in the late 2000s and left in ruins. The shore is unkempt so as the access paths to the lake while the quality of water hasn't been tested for years, though a crayfish, known to live only in the non-polluted waters, lives in the lake. The lake is still visited by the fishermen and has a reputation of a lover's lane. One of the classical works of Serbian filmmaking, The Marathon Family by Slobodan Šijan, was partially filmed on the lake in 1981. Public transportation line, bus No 408, connects Trešnja with Belgrade.

In order to make water less polluted, Belgrade administration and Forestry Institute jointly organized a project of naturally cleaning the lake water using floating islands, through the process of phytoremediation. The process was tested for the purposes of cleaning the highly polluted Topčiderka river, but was applied for the first time at Trešnja. First group of floating islands was placed on the lake surface in May 2019. They were removed in September 2019 and replaced with the new group of 50 plant islands in 2020. Constant testing of the water showed that the project was successful as the water in the vicinity of the island was cleaner, moving from the very bad, fourth category regarding pathogen bacteria, into the first, excellent category. The islands are made of edible canna, common reed, yellow iris, Siberian iris, common water-plantain and purple loosestrife. No chemicals are applied and the mineral wool is used as the growth substrate.

City planned to protect the forest in Trešnja in the 1960s. A decree was adopted in 1970 but never took effect, being suppressed by the new law on forests.

- Koviona, southernmost extension of Trešnja. It developed in the late 1970s. As it grew, it spread along the streets into the areas of the neighboring settlements Mala Ivanča, Ralja and Parcani. The hamlet had a population of 1,500 in 2022, and is notorious for the waterworks problems, which caused denizens to occasionally protest in public and to block local roads. The plan was made in 2009 to conduct water to the area, including the construction of the "Trešnja" complex of water reservoirs, but nothing has been done by June 2022 when it was announced that reservoirs will be built across the municipal border, in the Sopot municipality. The contractor was selected in December 2021, but the original project was declared "technically impracticable". New project, which includes three reservoirs, Koviona I, II and III, was drafted, but due to the disputes between the Sopot municipality and Belgrade administration, no works began by February 2023, and likely won't any time soon. At this time, it was announced also that Trešnja itself will be connected to the Ripanj, and further to Belgrade waterworks.

== Sources ==
- Jovan Đ. Marković (1990): Enciklopedijski geografski leksikon Jugoslavije; Svjetlost-Sarajevo; ISBN 86-01-02651-6
- Turističko područje Beograda, "Geokarta", 2007, ISBN 86-459-0099-8
