= Avala Tower =

Television and radio transmission tower near Belgrade, Serbia

- Авалски торањ Avalski toranj
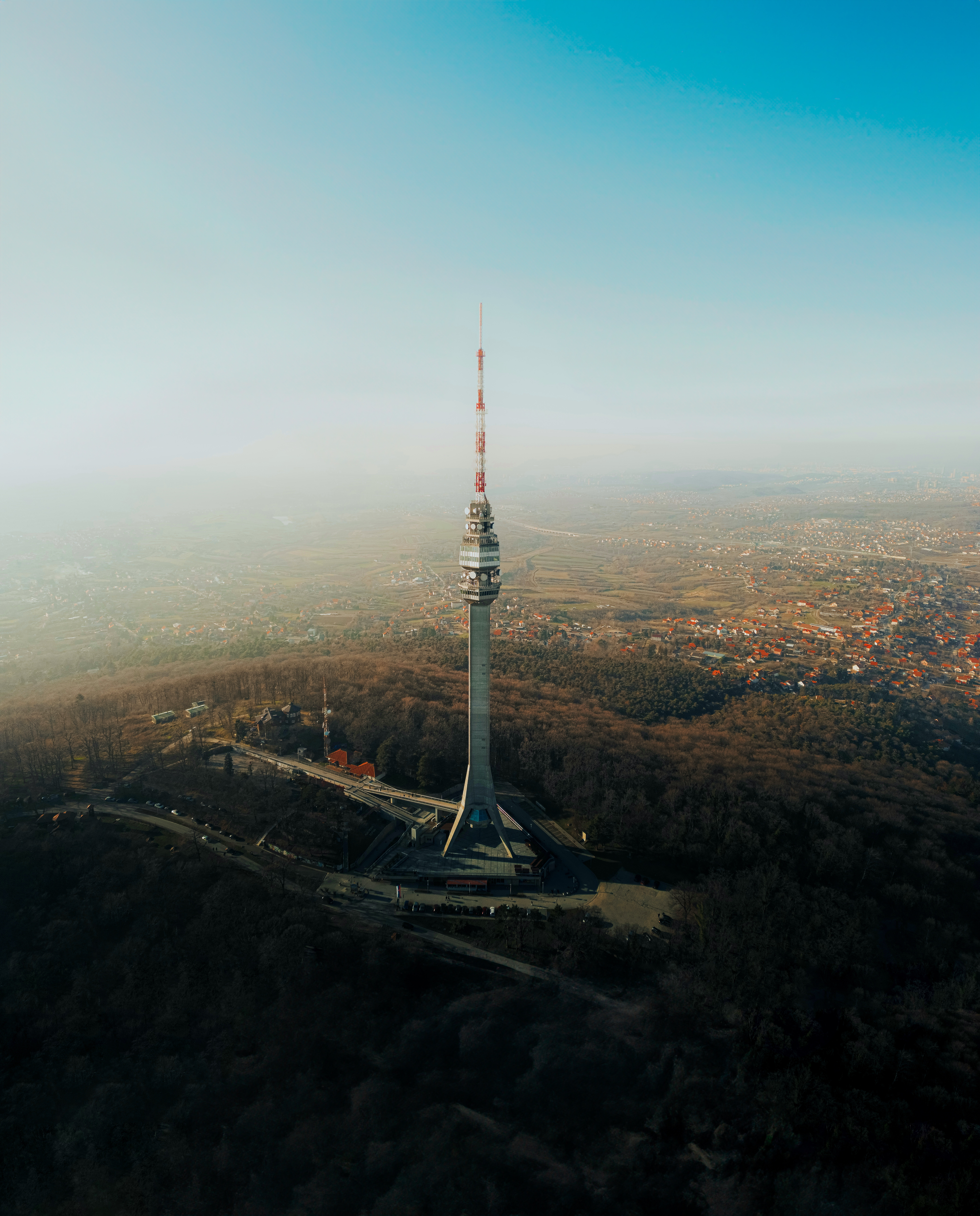
- Avala Tower in 2025
- Interactive map of the Avala Tower area

General information
- Status: Rebuilt
- Type: Telecommunication and observation
- Architectural style: Brutalism
- Location: Avala, Belgrade, Serbia
- Coordinates: 44°41′45.5″N 20°30′52″E
- Construction started: 1961 (original); 21 December 2006 (reconstruction)
- Completed: 1965 (original); 23 October 2009 (reconstruction)
- Destroyed: 29 April 1999 (original)

Height
- Antenna spire: 204.68 m (672 ft)

Technical details
- Floor count: 6
- Lifts/elevators: 2

Design and construction
- Architects: Uglješa Bogunović and Slobodan Janjić

The Avala Tower (Serbian: Авалски торањ, romanized: Avalski toranj) is a 204.68 m (672 ft) tall television and radio transmission tower located on Mount Avala, in Belgrade, Serbia. The original tower was finished in 1965, but was destroyed on 29 April 1999, during the NATO bombing of Yugoslavia. The tower's reconstruction commenced on 21 December 2006. It was officially reconstructed in 23 October 2009, and it was officially reopened on 21 April 2010.

== History ==
=== Origin ===
The tower was designed by architects Uglješa Bogunović and Slobodan Janjić, and engineer Milan Krstić. Contractor was the "Rad" construction company. Construction started on 14 October 1961 and was completed four years later, in 1965. The tower weighed 4,000 tonnes (3,900 long tons; 4,400 short tons). Between 102 m (335 ft) and 135 m (443 ft), there was an enclosed observation deck, entered at 122 m (400 ft) and reached via two quick elevators. It was the only tower in the world to have an equilateral triangle as its cross section, and one of very few towers not perched directly into the ground, but standing on its legs. The legs formed a tripod, the symbol of Serbian tripod chair (tronožac). It is one of the small number of towers to be constructed in that manner.

The tower was surmounted by an antenna, which was at first used for black and white television transmission. In 1971 the antenna was replaced by a new one for color TV transmission and the emitting of the TV Belgrade's Second program in color began on 31 December 1971. Also, the first digital terrestrial television in Serbia was emitted from the tower.

The project, which was of high risk, was finished without any worker injuries or deaths, which was unusual for a project of its size.

=== 1999 bombing ===
The Avala Tower was destroyed on 29 April 1999 by NATO bombardment. Previously the power supply to the station was destroyed, but a senior military officer installed a backup generator. The intent of the bombing was to put Radio Television Serbia (RTS) permanently off the air for the duration of the war; however RTS was relayed on a network of local TV stations which relayed its programming throughout the whole of Serbia. The Avala Tower was a symbol of pride and a famous landmark, not only of Belgrade and Serbia, but of the former Yugoslavia too. The tower was one of the last buildings to be destroyed before the end of the NATO operation. The tower was destroyed by two laser-guided bombs GBU-27 that hit one leg of the tower, causing its collapse.

=== Reconstruction ===
The idea of the tower's reconstruction at the same place it was destroyed originated from the Journalists' Association of Serbia in October 2002. In the early 2004, Radio Television Serbia (RTS) joined in with the media promotion of the project and commenced a series of fund-raising events in order to collect money for the construction. The project was endorsed and supported by numerous media, painters, writers, actors, musicians, athletes and businessmen. It is estimated that a million people, through various activities, supported the project.

An agreement regarding its construction was signed by Dušan Basara, director of the construction sector of the Ratko Mitrović Company – which was in charge of the construction of the tower – and general director of RTS, Aleksandar Tijanić. Many fund-raising events have been held for the collection of funds so a new tower can be constructed. One of the first was a match between Serbian grand slam-winning tennis players Ana Ivanovic and Novak Djokovic. All the proceeds went to the Avala Tower fund. Ceca Ražnatović (a Serbian folk singer) held a concert on 15 June 2006, with all the proceeds going to the Avala Tower fund. RTS ran commercials for donations to rebuild the tower. According to a December 2006 report, when it was announced that the construction of a new Avala Tower would commence that same month, over €1 million was collected through fund-raising and donations.

Clearing of the site began on 21 June 2005. Over one million tons of rubble was removed. Seismic survey followed and the construction works started on 21 December 2006. Initially, completion of the new tower was expected in August 2008, but construction works were severely delayed. The opening date was pushed back to 29 April 2009, the tenth anniversary of its destruction. Radio Television Serbia reported on 23 October 2009 that the tower had been completed.

The rebuilt tower was opened on 21 April 2010 and with 204.68 m (671.5 ft), it is 2 m (6 ft 7 in) higher than the demolished one. Materials used include 5,880 tons of concrete and 500 tons of reinforcement bars. The height of the reinforced concrete section is 136.65 metres (448.3 ft), while the steel antenna construction, and the antenna itself, are 68 metres (223 ft) tall.

=== Recent developments ===
In June 2017 the tourist complex was opened at the base of the tower. It includes, among other facilities, a restaurant, ethno-gallery, souvenir shop, sports fields and outdoor gym. By August 2017, 105 cement prints of the people who helped the reconstruction were displayed, including those of tennis players Novak Djokovic and Ana Ivanovic and a new lift, for the parents with children and the disabled, have been constructed.

In 2018 the children area at the base was expanded with the elf village, consisting of houses connected by a small bridge. A classroom in the open was set in the pine forest and the artificial climbing rock was built. On 19 October 2018, a colorful decorative light on the entire tower became operational.

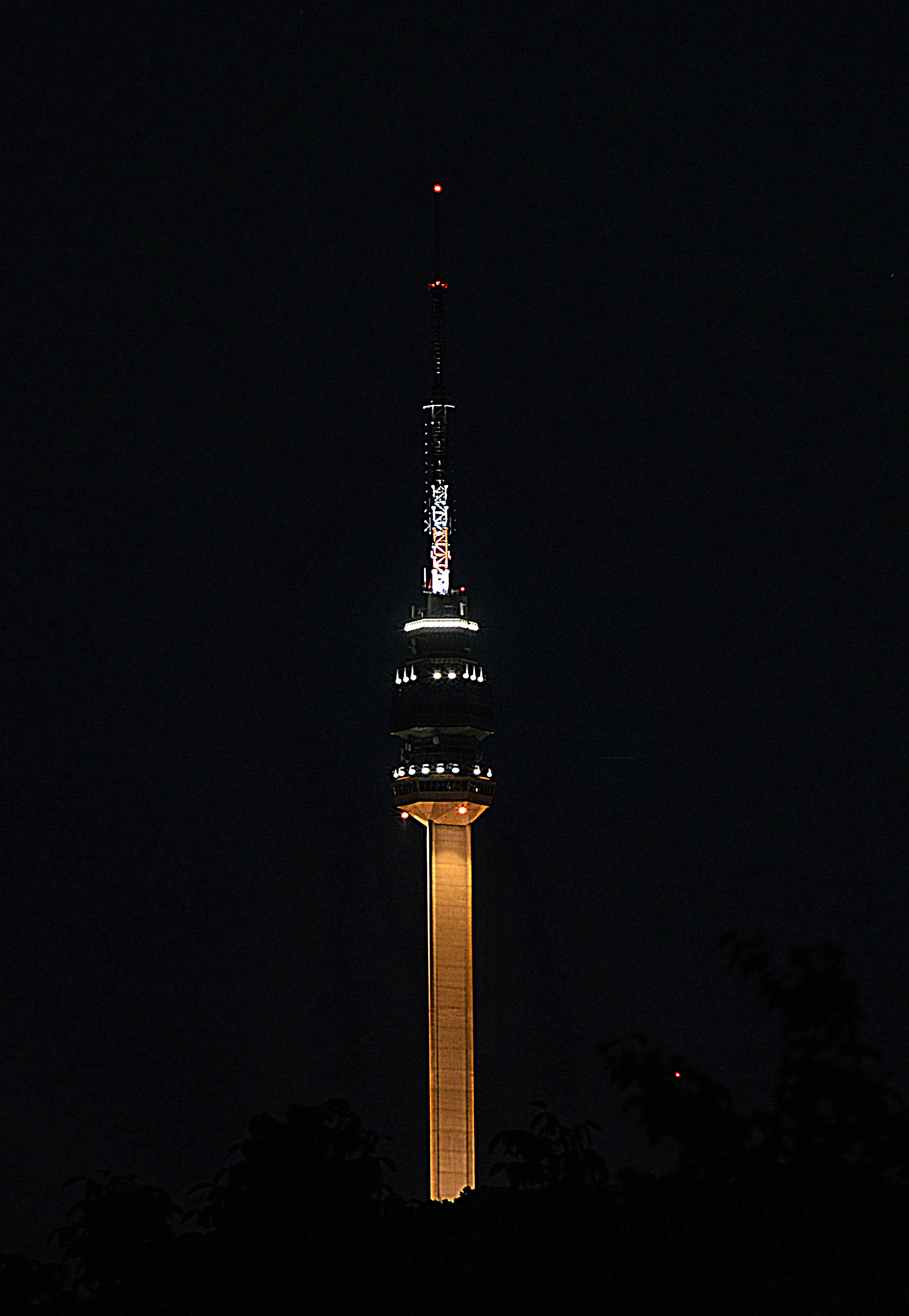
Tower at night

== Gallery ==
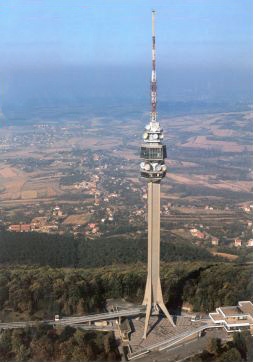
The original Avala Tower, destroyed in 1999

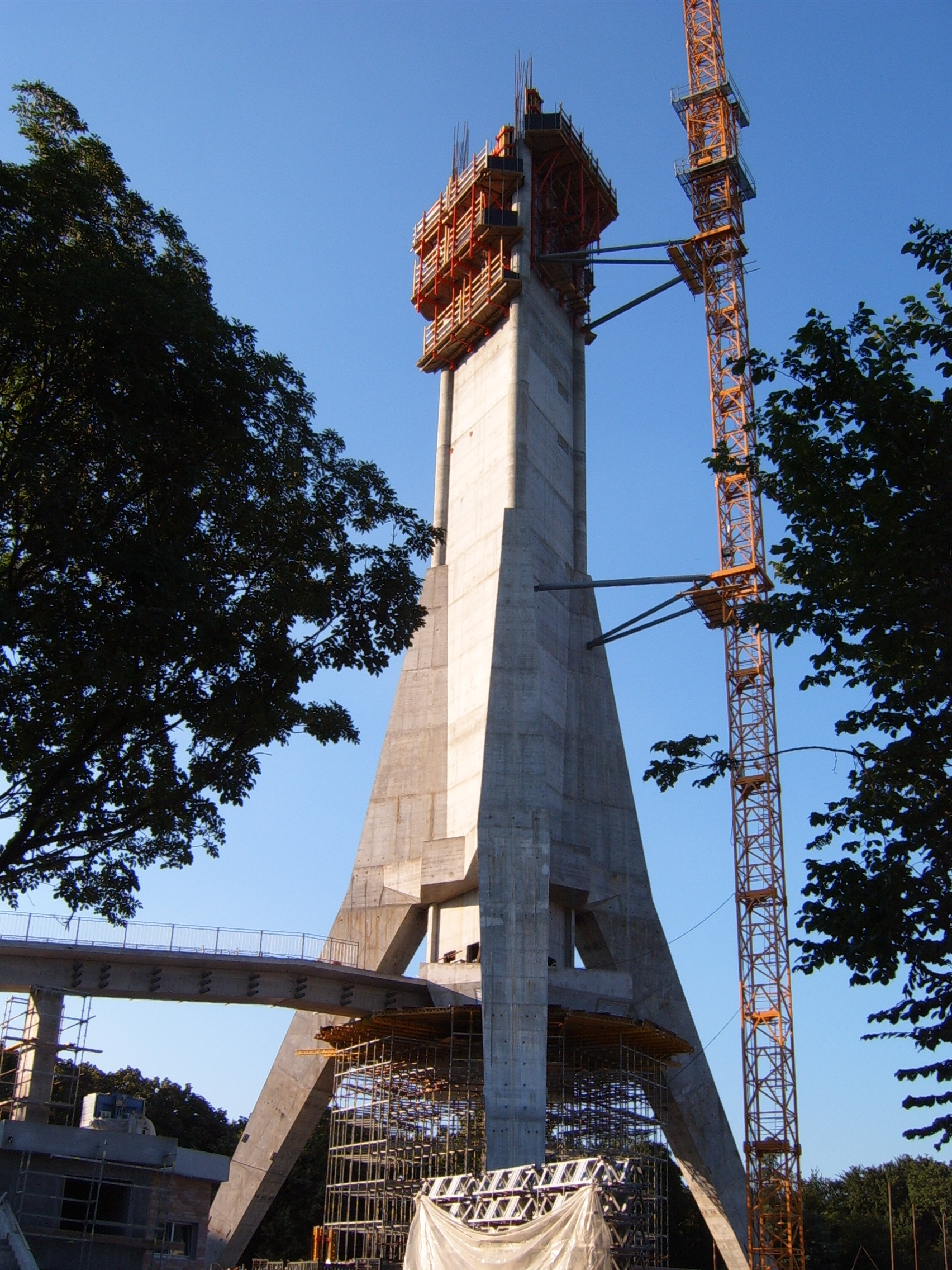
New tower under construction, 2008

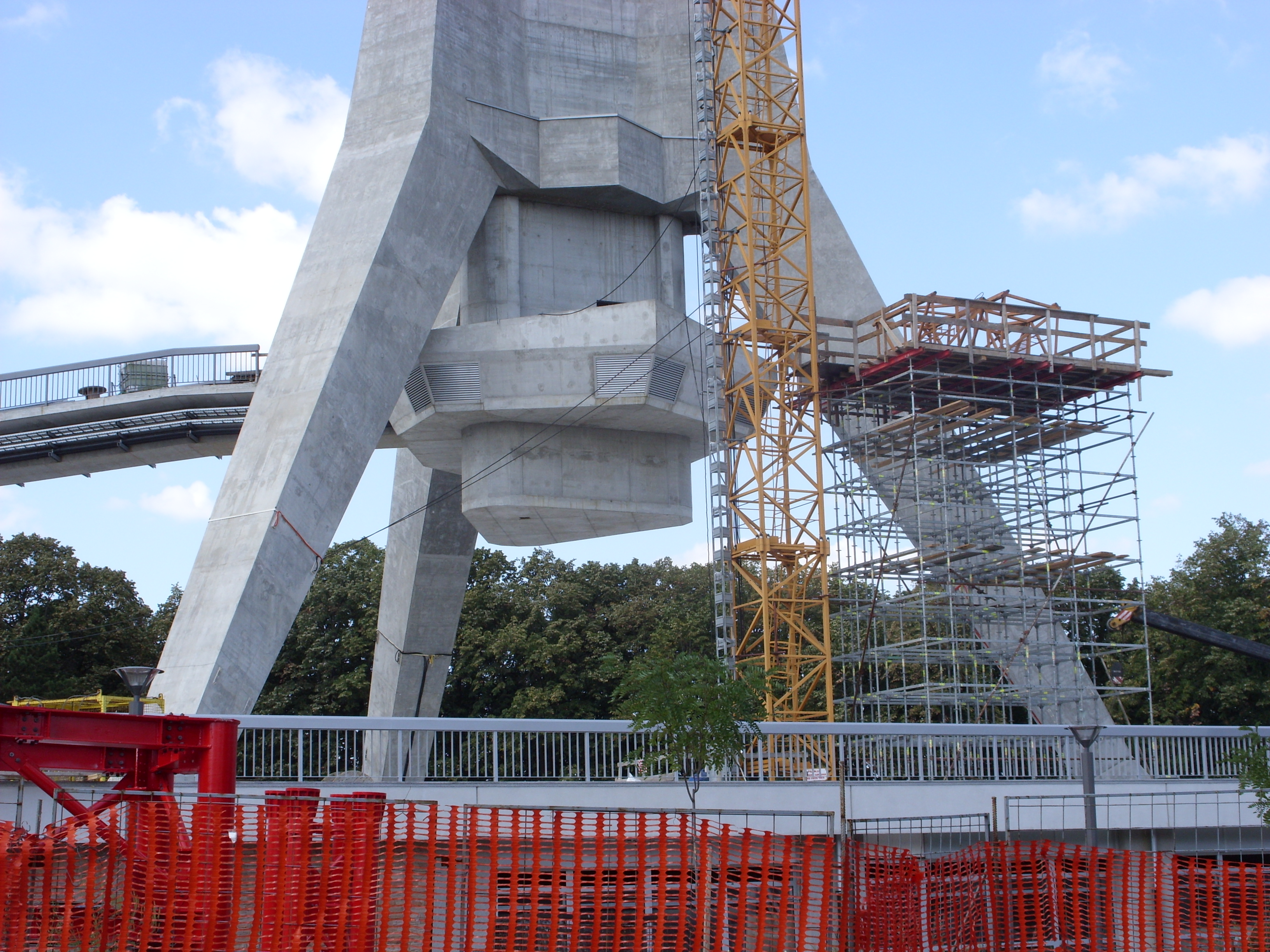
Tower construction in 2009

== Radio and TV frequencies ==
FM radio:

- 95.3 MHz – Radio Belgrade 1
- 97.6 MHz – Radio Belgrade 2/3
- 98.5 MHz – Hit FM
- 101.4 MHz – Karolina
- 104.0 MHz – Radio Belgrade 202

DVB-T2 digital television:

- UHF channel 22 – MUX 1 (national):
  - RTS 1
  - RTS 2
  - RTS3
  - RTV Pink
  - B92
  - Prva Srpska Televizija
  - Happy TV
- UHF channel 28 – MUX 2:
  - regional and local TV stations, including Studio B
- UHF channel 45 – MUX 3:
  - pay TV services

== See also ==
- List of tallest buildings in Serbia
- Architecture of Belgrade
- List of towers
- List of masts These are also often used as for TV broadcasts.
