= Karađorđev Park railway station =

In Belgrade, Serbia

Karađorđev Park Карађорђев парк
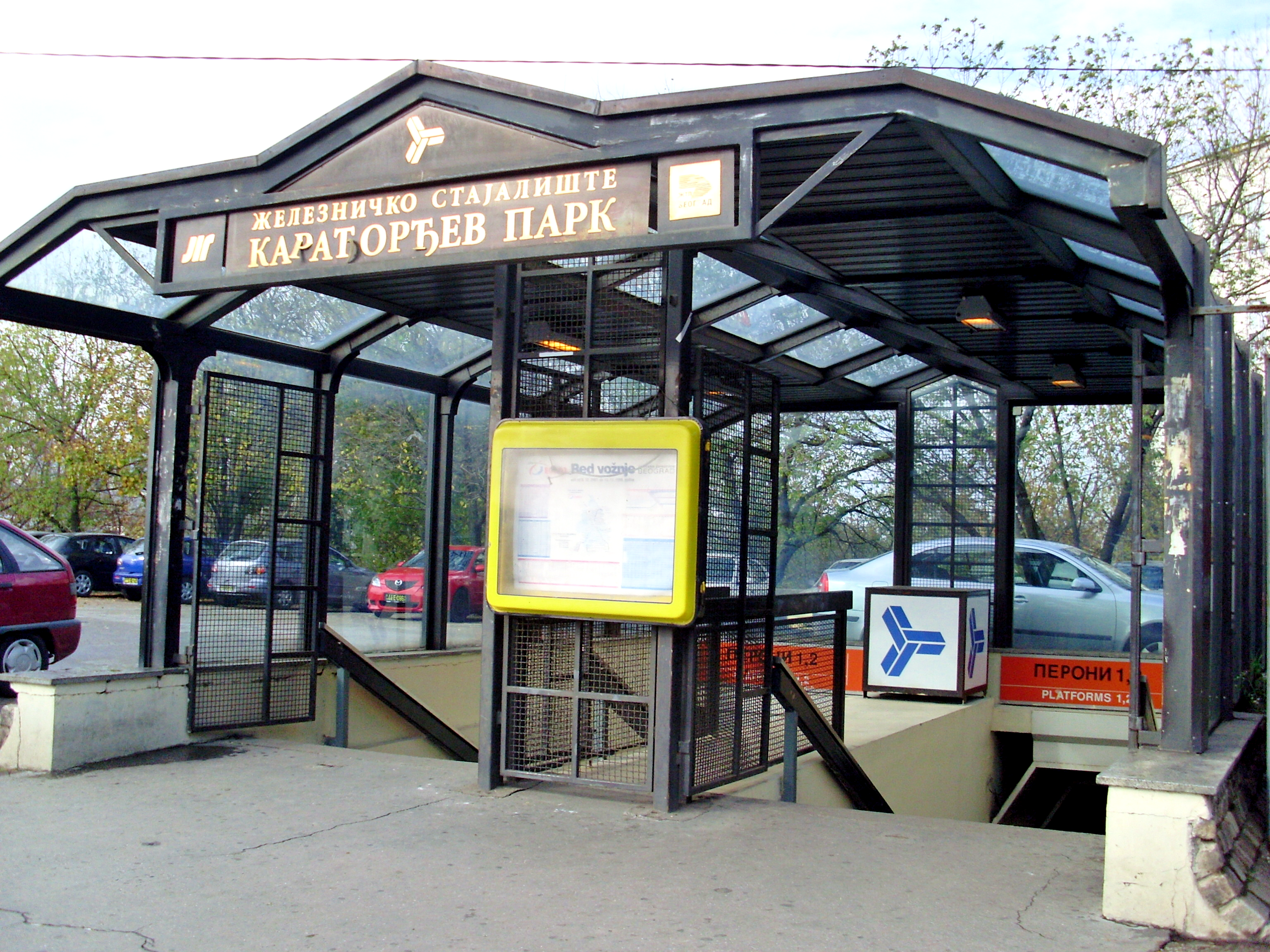
- Entry to the Karađorđe's Park railway station

General information
- Location: Franše D'Eperea Boulevard bb Belgrade; Serbia
- Coordinates: 44°47′35″N 20°27′55″E
- Owner: Serbian Railways Infrastructure
- Platforms: 2 (1 island)
- Tracks: 2
- Train operators: Srbijavoz, JKP Beogradski metro i voz (as BG:VOZ)
- Connections: buses and trams (direct, walking required): from Franše D'Eperea stop at Bulevar oslobođenja: 8 - from Omladinski stadion to Banjica; 9 - from Banjica to Blok 45; 10 - from Kalemegdan to Banjica; 14 - from Ustanička to Banjica; 30, 31, 33, 36, 39, 42, 47, 48, 59, 78, 401, 405 - to multiple termini; from stops at the Autokomanda interchange: 17, 18, 30, 31, 38L, 46, 55, 70 - to multiple termini

Construction
- Structure type: Underground
- Accessible: No

Other information
- Fare zone: None (formerly A)

Services
Preceding station	BG Voz	Following station
Belgrade Centre towards Batajnica	Line 1	Vukov spomenik towards Ovča
Rakovica towards Resnik	Line 2	Vukov spomenik towards Ovča
Belgrade Centre towards Mladenovac	Line 3	Vukov spomenik towards Ovča
Rakovica towards Lazarevac	Line 4	Vukov spomenik towards Ovča
Preceding station	Srbijavoz	Following station
Belgrade Center towards Zemun	Re (Regio)	Pančevo Glavna towards Pančevo Vojlovica
Belgrade Center towards Zemun	Re (Regio)	Vukov spomenik towards Vršac
Location
- Location within Belgrade

Karađorđev Park railway station is an underground railway station in the municipality of Savski Venac in Belgrade, Serbia. One of the city's two underground stations, it is located under the Liberation Boulevard (Serbian: Булевар ослобођења, romanized: Bulevar oslobođenja) as it connects to the Autokomanda interchange over the A1 motorway.

The station consists of two tracks: to the north, they follow into the Vračar Tunnel under the downtown, eventually reaching Vukov spomenik; to the south, they extend into the triangle-shaped railway junction. From there, trains connect to either Belgrade Centre to the west or Rakovica to the south. Those BG Voz's trains that run to the west are Lines 1 & 3, while those that run to the south are Lines 2 & 4; this way, Karađorđe's Park is served by all four primary lines.

In addition to suburban lines, the station is also served by intercity routes: electrified Panvoz trains run to Pančevo, while diesel-powered Regio trains run to Vršac. As for urban transit, Karađorđev Park is a brief walk away from Franše D'Eperea tram and bus stop, as well as from the Autokomanda interchange.

== Gallery ==
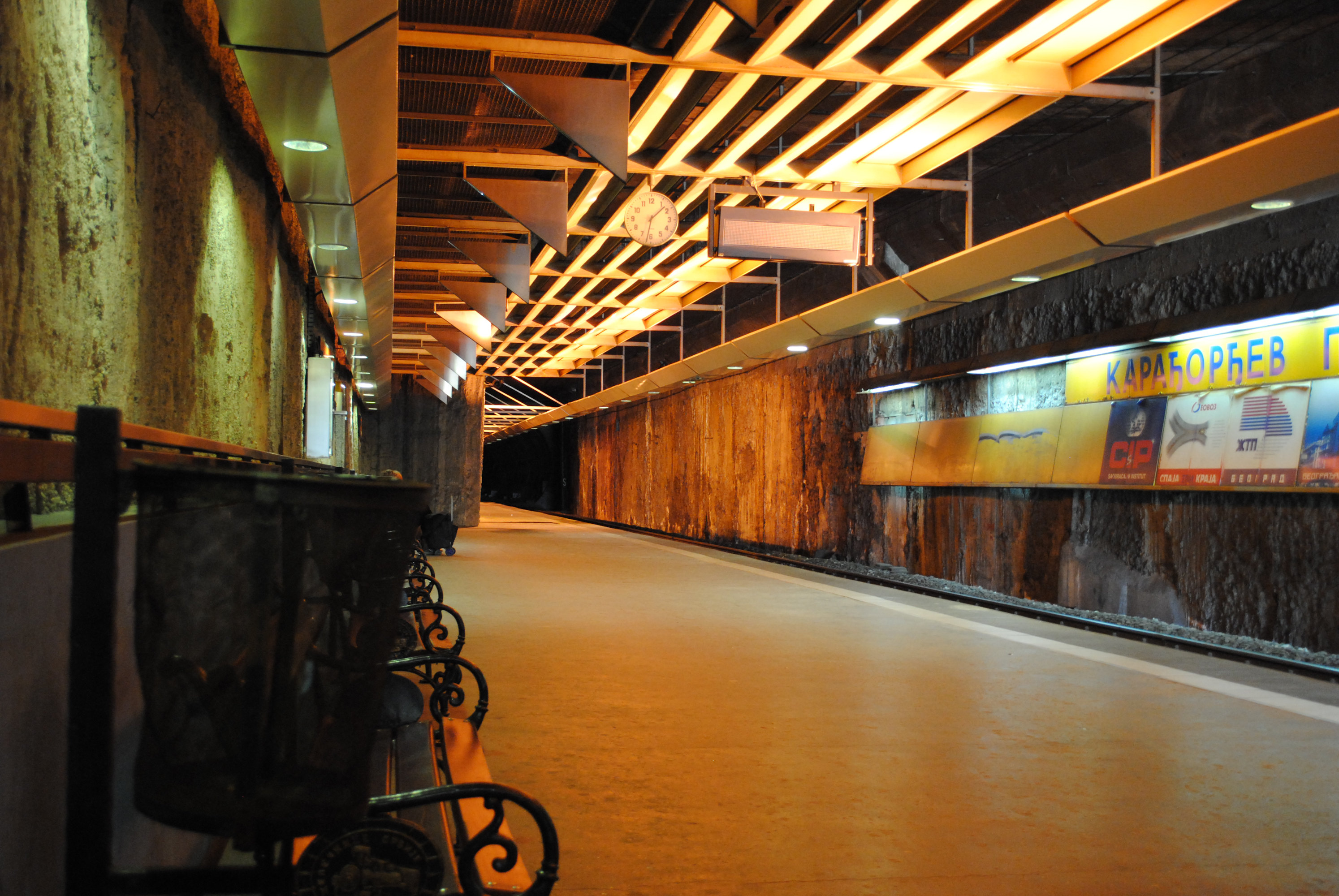
Karađorđev Park railway station

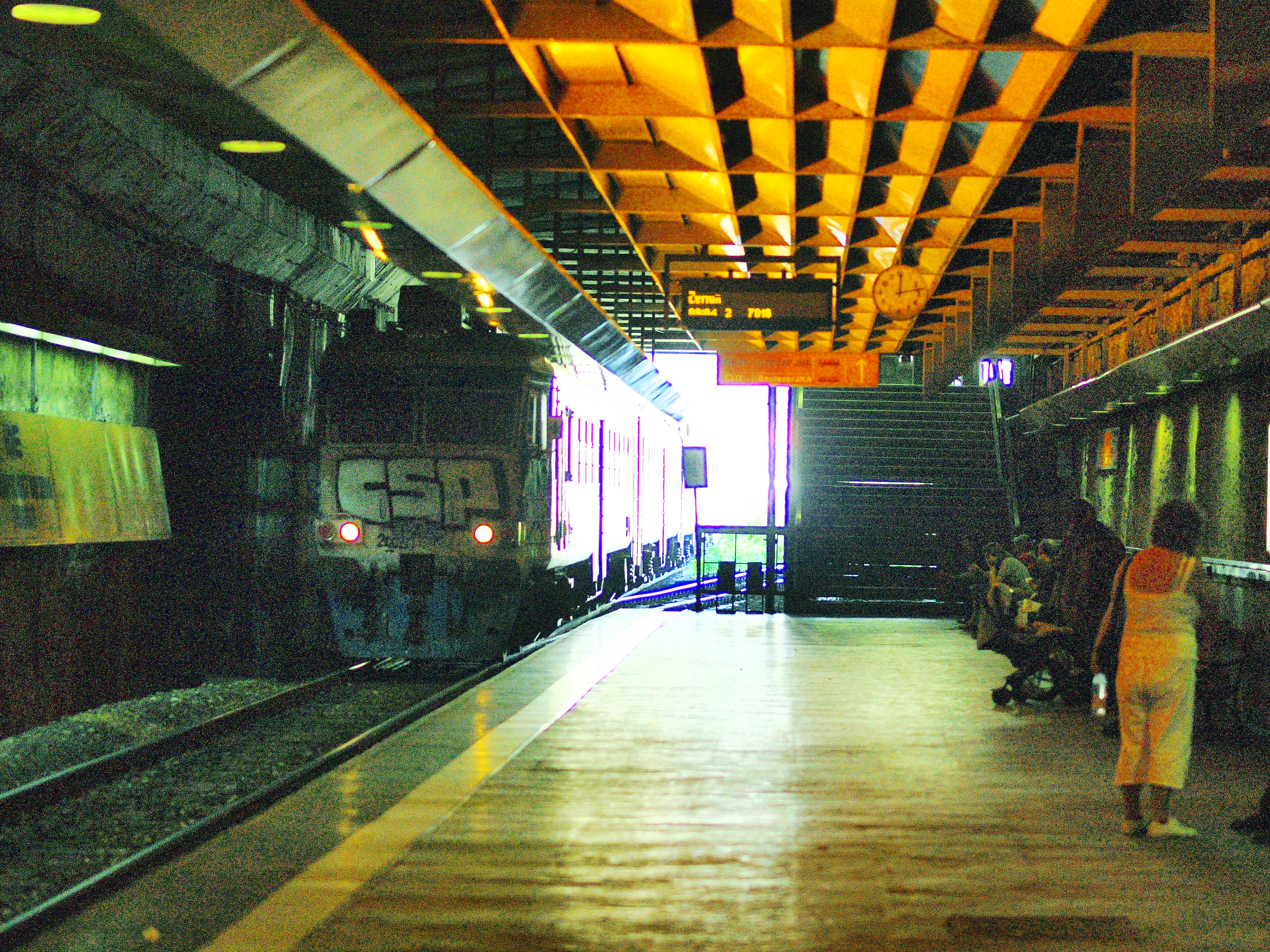
Karađorđev Park railway station

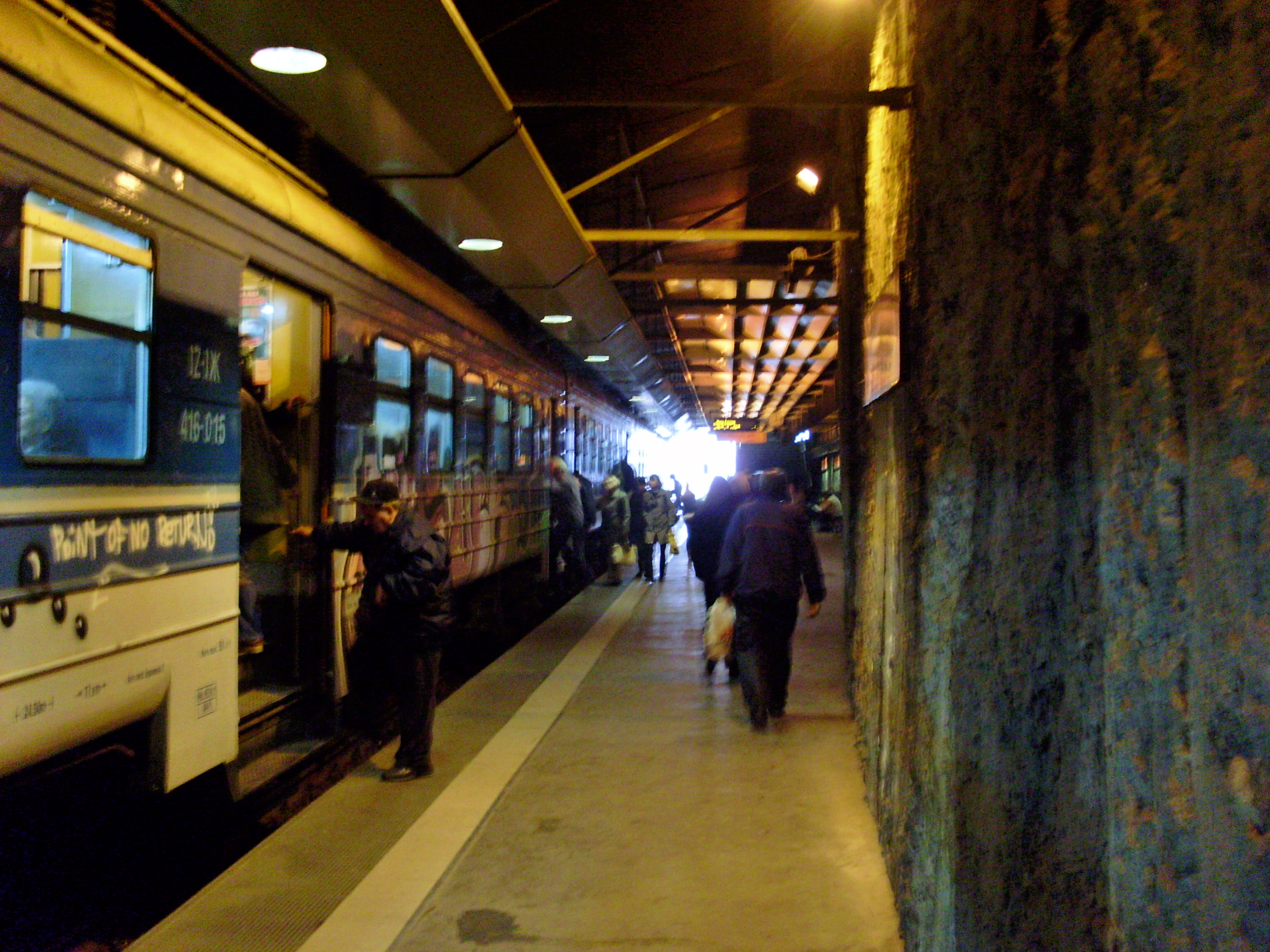
Beovoz in Karađorđev Park railway station

== See also ==
- Serbian Railways
- Beovoz
- BG Voz
