= Belgrade Central Station =

Belgrade Central Station may refer to:

- Belgrade Centre railway station (2018‒) (Železnička stanica Beograd Centar / Железничка станица Београд Центар), colloquially known as Prokop (Прокоп) railway station, the current but yet unfinished main railway station in Belgrade, opened January 2016
- Belgrade Main railway station (1884‒2018) (Železnička stanica Beograd–Glavna / Железничка станица Београд–Главна), the former centrally located main railway station in Belgrade, closed July 2018

Note that as of autumn 2018, some international trains to Belgrade only stop at Topčider railway station.
