= Tošin Bunar railway station =

Railway station in Belgrade, Serbia

Tošin Bunar Тошин бунар
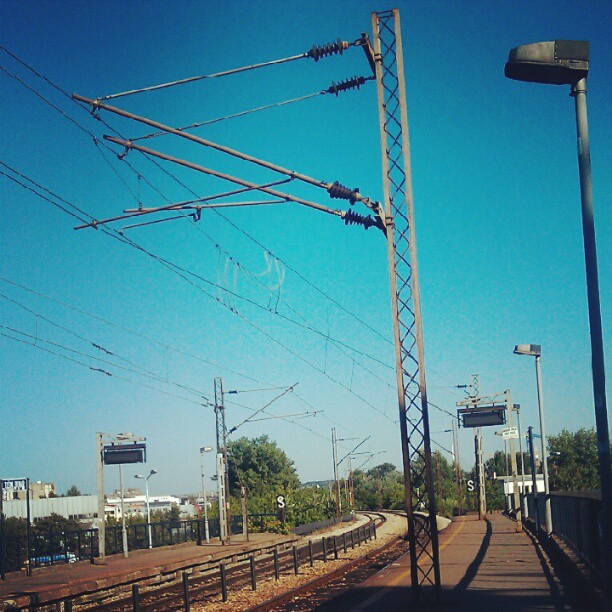

General information
- Location: New Belgrade; Serbia
- Coordinates: 44.818°N 20.3945°E
- Owner: Serbian Railways
- Platforms: 2 side platforms
- Tracks: 2
- Connections: 45, 65, 71, 72, 82, 601, 613

Construction
- Structure type: Elevated

Services
Preceding station	BG Voz	Following station
Zemun towards Batajnica	Line 1	New Belgrade towards Ovča
Preceding station	Srbijavoz	Following station
New Belgrade towards Belgrade Centre	Re (Regio)	Zemun towards Novi Sad
New Belgrade towards Belgrade Centre	Re (Regio)	Zemun towards Sremska Mitrovica
New Belgrade towards Belgrade Centre	Re (Regio)	Zemun towards Šid
Zemun Terminus	Re (Regio)	New Belgrade towards Pancevo Varoš
Route map
Location
- Location within Belgrade

Tošin Bunar (Serbian: Железничка станица Тошин бунар; Železnička stanica Tošin bunar) is a rail station in Belgrade, Serbia. It is located in the Novi Beograd settlement in the municipality of Novi Beograd. It is served by BG Voz. The railroad continues to Zemun in one direction, and New Belgrade in the other direction. Tošin Bunar railway station consists of 2 railway tracks with 2 side platforms.

In October 2020 the station was moved some 150 meters toward Novi Beograd station, due to safety concerns.

== See also ==
- Serbian Railways
- BG Voz
