= Novi Beograd railway station =

Railway station in Belgrade, Serbia

Novi Beograd Нови Београд
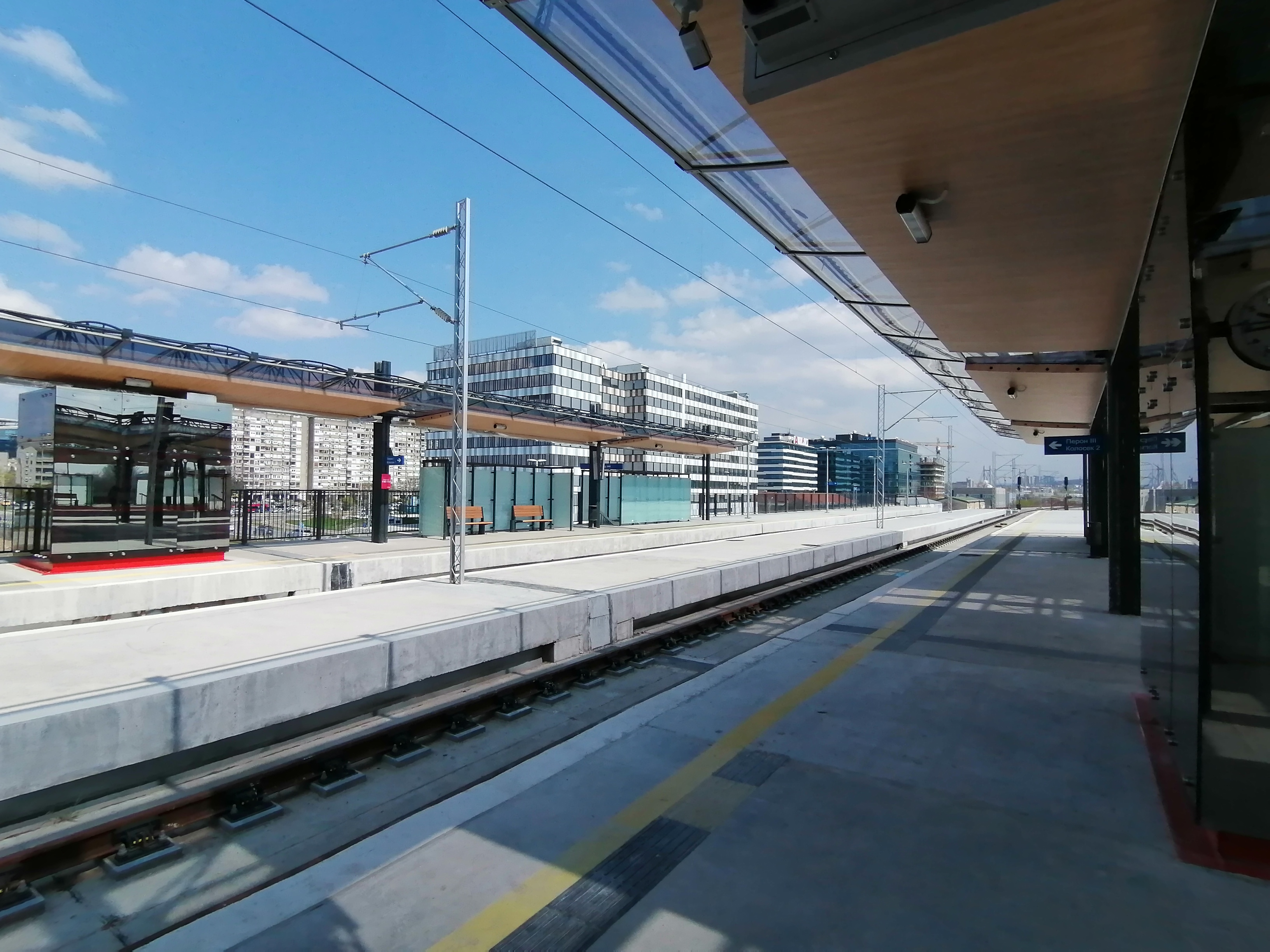
- New Belgrade railway station

General information
- Location: Antifašističke borbe bb New Belgrade, Belgrade; Serbia
- Coordinates: 44°48′26″N 20°25′06″E
- Owner: Serbian Railways
- Operator: Infrastruktura železnice Srbije
- Lines: Belgrade–Novi Sad, Belgrade–Šid, Belgrade–Mali Zvornik, Belgrade–Subotica, Zemun–Prijepolje, Zemun–Niš, Zemun–Vršac, BG Voz 1–4
- Tracks: 5
- Train operators: Srbija voz
- Connections: Trams : 7, 9, 11, 13; Buses : 67, 89, 94, 95, 600, EKO 1 Mini bus: E1, E6

Construction
- Structure type: Elevated
- Parking: Yes
- Cycle facilities: Yes
- Accessible: Yes

Other information
- Fare zone: BG:VOZ (zone A)

History
- Opened: December 1969; 56 years ago
- Rebuilt: 2022

Services
| Preceding station | BG Voz | Following station |
|---|---|---|
| Tošin Bunar towards Batajnica | Line 1 | Belgrade Centre towards Ovča |
| Preceding station | Srbijavoz | Following station |
| Belgrade Centre Terminus | Re (Regio) | Tosin Bunar towards Novi Sad |
| Belgrade Centre Terminus | Re (Regio) | Tosin Bunar towards Sremska Mitrovica |
| Belgrade Centre Terminus | Re (Regio) | Tosin Bunar towards Šid |
| Zemun Terminus | Re (Regio) | Belgrade Centre towards Niš |
| Tosin Bunar towards Zemun | Re (Regio) | Belgrade Centre towards Pancevo Varoš |
| Zemun Terminus | Re (Regio) | Belgrade Centre towards Vršac |
| Zemun Terminus | Re (Regio) | Belgrade Centre towards Valjevo |
| Zemun Terminus | Re (Regio) | Belgrade Centre towards Prijepolje Teretna |
| Zemun Terminus | Brzi (Fast train) | Belgrade Centre towards Bar, Montenegro |
Location
- Location within Belgrade

Novi Beograd railway station (Serbian Cyrillic: Железничка станица Нови Београд) is a railway station in New Belgrade, Belgrade, Serbia. The railroad continues to Tošin Bunar and Zemun in one direction, and Belgrade Centre in the other direction. New Belgrade railway station consists of five railway tracks. It primarily serves New Belgrade, the central business district of Belgrade, and therefore is notably used by commuters from Novi Sad, Inđija and Stara Pazova. Since Belgrade centre railway station has weak connections to the network of public transport, New Belgrade railway station is also used by passenger from some neighbourhoods on the right bank of Sava, especially the ones in Čukarica municipality. Belgrade's Main bus station is located adjacent to the New Belgrade railway station.

== History ==
The station is constructed on the 450 metres (1,480 ft)-long elevated platform. The structure was made of 25.000 cubic metres (882.9 cu ft) prestressed concrete. A deadline for the station itself was set for September 1969 with the first trains passing through in December 1969. The wider project of the surrounding zone was ambitious and detailed, including the construction of a mini-city under the station: 25.000 square metres (269.10 sq ft) of built-up space hosting numerous shops, mega mall, restaurants, snack bars, pastry shops, tourist agencies, department store, exchange offices, various agencies, flower shops, cosmetics shops, toy shops, souvenir stands, a 24/7 cinema, and variety show venue. Though a deadline for this part of the project was set for 1974, ultimately none of these additional objects were built.

With the over 40–year long construction of the Belgrade Centre railway station in Prokop continuously hindered by numerous problems and bad positioning, by 2022 it became apparent that Prokop would never take on the role of the former Main railway station, despite being gradually opened for rail transportation from 2016 to 2018. Instead, the New Belgrade railway station took over as the busiest station in the entire country, with future plans to expand it to become the central traffic hub in Belgrade. The station, though itself inadequately equipped, initially took over the role of the main station, as it was better connected with other parts of the city and much more accessible than Prokop, and by early 2019 emerged as one of the busiest stations.

Transportation minister Tomislav Momirović confirmed in March 2022 that the New Belgrade railway station "will remain" the busiest one. At the time, the majority of passengers on the inaugural trip via the Belgrade–Novi Sad high-speed railway line used the New Belgrade station, not Prokop. Being held back in almost every department, by this time it became apparent that, though it may become an important station in the future, Prokop would never assume the role of the former Main railway station. Construction of the new Belgrade main bus station next to the New Belgrade railway station has shown that the decision was to make the New Belgrade station part of the future central transportation hub in Belgrade.

As part of the 2017–2022 construction of the Belgrade–Novi Sad high-speed railway, the station was partially upgraded and reconstructed, including works on the canopy, staircase, plateau, and the addition of a ticket booth and six elevators. The works were to be finished on 28 May 2023, but they extended. Regarding the growing importance of the station, a proper main station building is also planned.

By July 2023, there were 180 trains passing through the station on workdays. In September 2024, a new Belgrade's Main bus station was opened across the street from the New Belgrade railway station, replacing the old Belgrade Bus Station.

== Services ==
Srbija voz offers following services:

- Intercity (IC) Belgrade Centre – Novi Sad - Vrbas - Subotica (non-stop service to Subotica, one train in-between time interval of 2 hours from 06:13 to 22:04 (06:13 AM to 10:04 PM),
- Belgrade Centre - Mali Zvornik
- InterRegio (IR) Belgrade Centre - Subotica (five trains a day, non-peak/peak hours)
- Regio Express (REx) Belgrade Centre – Novi Sad (six trains per day, usually in peak hours)
- Regio (RE) Belgrade Centre – Novi Sad (two trains in three hours), Belgrade Centre - Šid, Zemun - Nis, Zemun - Vršac, Zemun - Prijepolje Teretna
- Eurocity (EC) Belgrade Centre - Budapest (Opening to passenger traffic late spring / early summer 2026)
- Fast (B) Novi Sad - Bar (Operates during every summer 14th June - 16th September)
- Local (BG) BG:VOZ line 1 (Batajnica – Ovča), some trains on lines 2, 3, 4 ( Zemun to Resnik, Mladenovac and Lazarevac)

International services to Wien, Zagreb and Ljubljana, which called at the station before the commencement of the reconstruction of Belgrade Centre – Novi Sad – Subotica railway. Trains to Subotica have commenced again to passenger traffic from October 7th 2025.

== See also ==
- Serbian Railways
- Beovoz
- BG Voz
