= Rakovica railway station =

Railway station in Belgrade, Serbia

Coordinates: 44°44′46″N 20°26′33″E

Rakovica Раковица
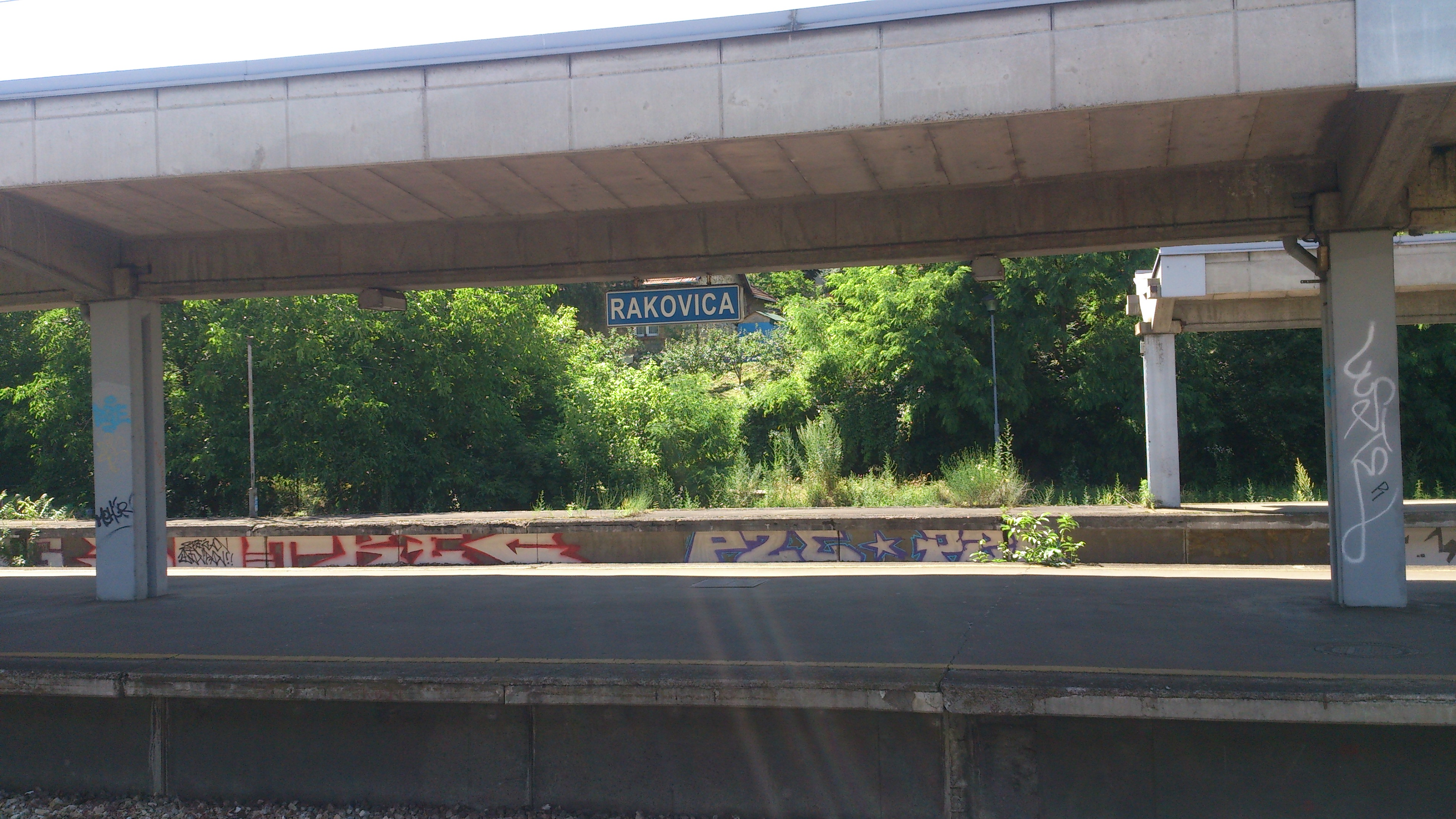

General information
- Location: Serbia
- Tracks: 7

Services
Preceding station	BG Voz	Following station
Belgrade Centre towards Resnik	Line 2	Kneževac towards Ovča
Preceding station	Srbijavoz	Following station
Belgrade Centre towards Zemun	Re (Regio)	Resnik towards Valjevo
Belgrade Centre towards Zemun	Re (Regio)	Resnik towards Prijepolje Teretna
Belgrade Centre Terminus	Re (Regio)	Resnik towards Niš
Belgrade Centre towards Zemun	Re (Regio)	Resnik towards Niš
Belgrade Centre towards Zemun	InterRegio	Resnik towards Niš
Location

Rakovica railway station (Serbian: Железничка станица Раковица) is a railway station of Belgrade railway junction, Belgrade–Niš and Belgrade–Požarevac railway. Located in Rakovica, Belgrade. Railroad continues to Resnik in one, in the other direction to Belgrade Center, in the third direction to Belgrade marshalling yard "B", in fourth direction to Jajinci and the fifth direction towards to Topčider. Rakovica railway station consists of 7 railway tracks.

== See also ==
- Serbian Railways
