= Resnik railway station =

Railway station in Belgrade, Serbia

Coordinates: 44°42′20″N 20°26′53″E

Resnik Ресник
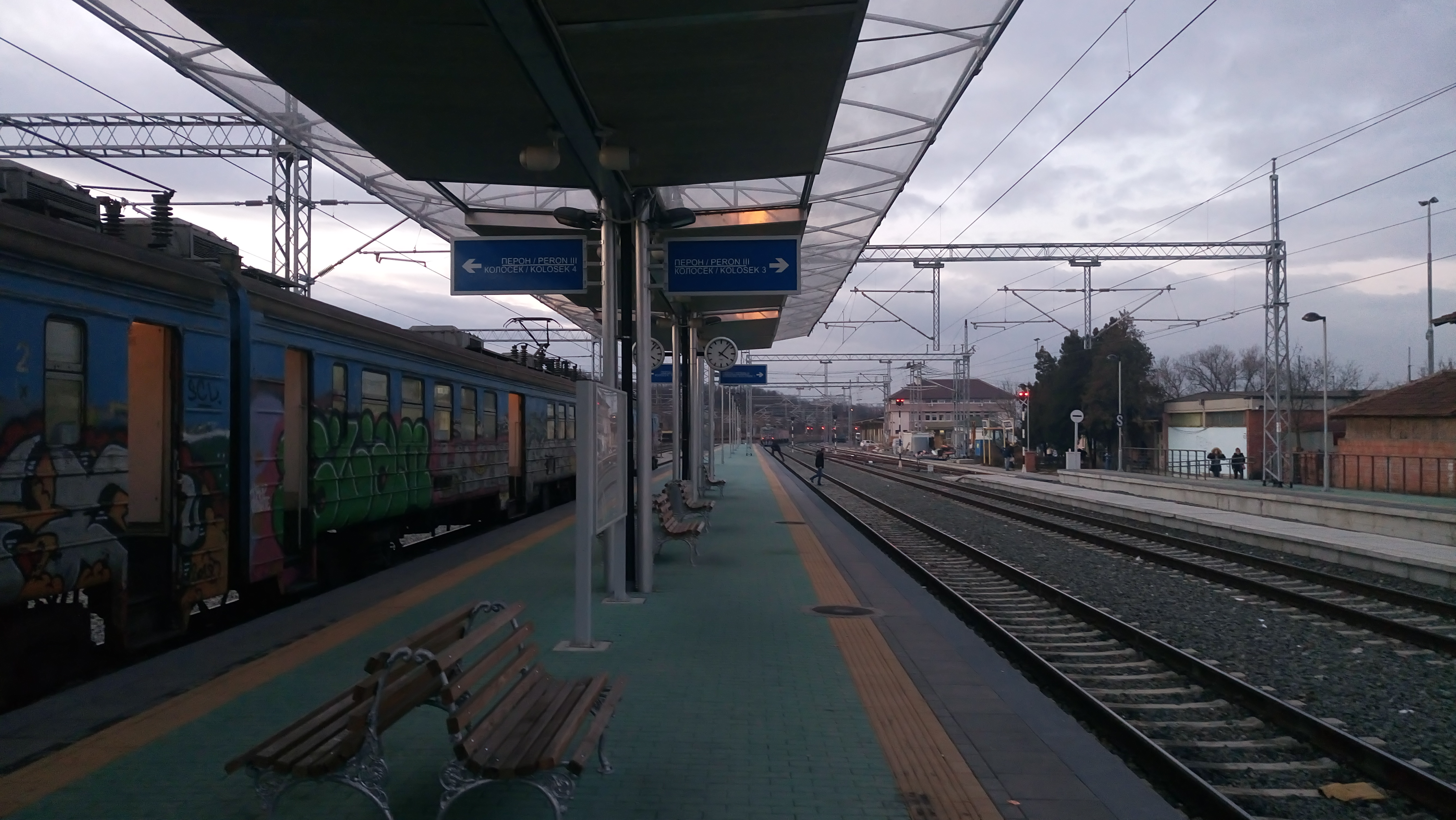

General information
- Location: Serbia
- Tracks: 9

Services
Preceding station	BG Voz	Following station
Kijevo towards Resnik	Line 2	Terminus
Preceding station	Srbijavoz	Following station
Rakovica towards Zemun	InterRegio	Ripanj towards Niš
Rakovica towards Zemun or Belgrade Centre	Re (Regio)	Ripanj towards Niš
Rakovica towards Zemun	Re (Regio)	Barajevo Centar towards Valjevo
Rakovica towards Zemun	Re (Regio)	Barajevo Centar towards Prijepolje Teretna
Location

Resnik railway station (Serbian: Железничка станица Ресник) is a railway station of Belgrade railway junction, Belgrade–Niš and Belgrade–Bar railway. Located in Resnik, Rakovica, Belgrade. Railroad continues to Pinosava in one, in the other direction to Bela Reka, in third direction to Rakovica, in fourth direction to Belgrade marshalling yard "A", in fifth direction to Ostružnica and the sixth direction towards to Belgrade marshalling yard "B" per irregular track via Junction "A" of Belgrade railway junction near Kneževac. Resnik railway station consists of 9 railway tracks.

== See also ==
- Serbian Railways
