= Topčider railway station =

Train station in Belgrade, Serbia

Topčider Railway Station Железничка станица Тоpčider / Železnička stanica Topčider
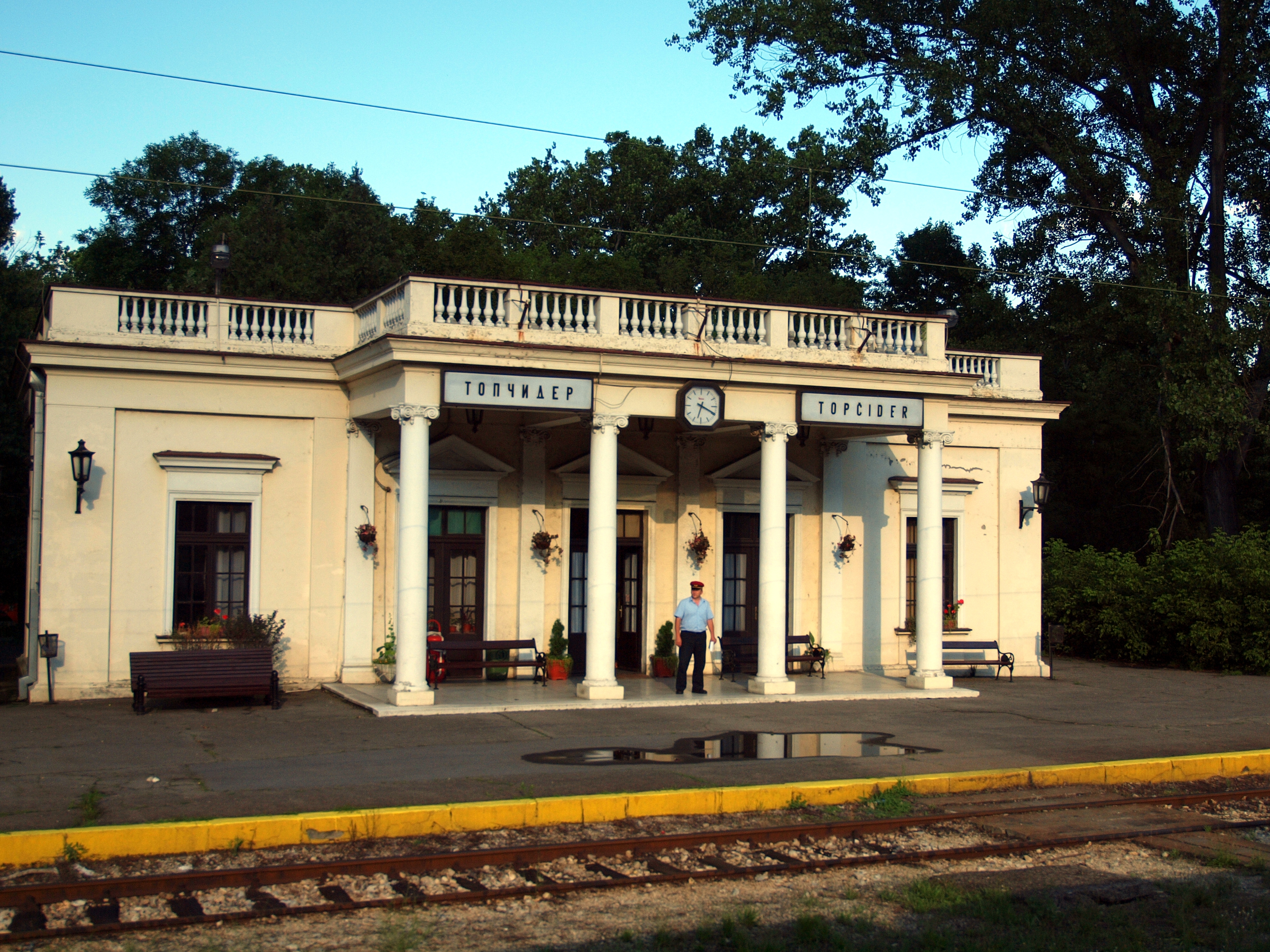

General information
- Location: Topčider, Belgrade; Serbia
- Coordinates: 44.777°N 20.4359°E
- Owner: Serbian Railways

Construction
- Structure type: At-grade

History
- Opened: 7 May 1884; 142 years ago
- Closed: 1 October 2021
Location
- Location within Belgrade

Topčider railway station (Serbian: Железничка станица Топчидер, Železnička stanica Topčider) is a historical railway station in Belgrade, capital of Serbia. It is located in the large Topčider park, south of the city center. Having been defunct for more than 30 years, it underwent a partial renovation in 2018 in order to support relocation of long distance motorail services on the Belgrade–Bar railway, following the closing of the Belgrade Main railway station. The station was again closed for passengers on 1 October 2021.

== History ==
The station building was built in 1884, at the location where Prince Milan Obrenović IV marked the origin of the future Belgrade–Niš railway. It was designed as an auxiliary station, serving up to 10,000 passengers in summer months. During World War I, it briefly took over the role of the city's main station, but was destroyed by a bomb. Following a reconstruction in 1931, a royal waiting room was appended, in order to cater to high guests of the Beli dvor royal complex in the vicinity. It was again destroyed during World War II (it was bombed in 1941), and only the royal waiting room wing survived, which took over the role of the passenger hall. After the war, it served as a home station and garage for the famous Blue Train of Yugoslav leader Josip Broz Tito, who resided in the former royal palace. After Tito's death, the station hosted a small historical exhibition. It was also used as a filming location.

== 2018 revitalization ==
In the early 2016, a gradual moving of trains from the Belgrade Main railway station to the new Belgrade Centre railway station, colloquially called Prokop station, began. In December 2017, all but two national trains were relocated to Belgrade Centre.

However, problems arose immediately. Prokop is still unfinished and has no station building or proper access roads and public transportation connections with the rest of the city. Additionally, it has no facilities for loading and unloading cars from the car shuttle trains nor was ever planned to have one. Still, in January 2018 it was announced that the Belgrade Main station will be completely closed to traffic, which finally happened on 1 July 2018, even though none of the projects needed for the complete removal of railway traffic were finished. Prokop is incomplete, the projected main freight station in Zemun is not being adapted at all while there is even no project on a Belgrade railway beltway so a series of temporary solutions had to be applied. One was a defunct and deteriorated Topčider station, which was partially revitalized and adapted for the car shuttle trains until the freight station at Zemun is finished. Topčider station has several flaws, including poor public transportation connections (only one tram line, No. 3), so the state railway company asked officially for this problem to be solved. The deadline for the Zemun station was set at two years, but the work is not scheduled to begin until the end of 2018. Around din. 4,000,000 (€330,000) has been invested into the renovation of salons and adaptation of the ticket office, waiting room, and public toilets. Access ramps, a parking lot, a tram station, and pedestrian crossings have also been adapted, and an info board was installed.

Two intermittent lines of public transportation were added, tram No. 3L and bus No. 38A, but the complaints from the passengers that the station is simply inadequate continued. Still, in July 2018 more trains were transferred to the station: international trains to Thessaloniki and Sofia and the tourist line "Romantika", to Sremski Karlovci.

By June 2021, the station remained hard to reach, and passengers remained confused. Instead of Prokop or Topčider, the New Belgrade railway station took over the de facto role of the main station, despite being as inadequately equipped. It turned out to be the busiest one, with better connections with other parts of the city and being much more accessible. The Topčider station was closed for passengers again on 1 October 2021 and all lines were rerouted to Prokop, leaving the city without a facility to load cars as the Zemun freight station still wasn't finished.

== See also ==
- Serbian Railways
- BG Voz
