= Belgrade Centre Railway Station =

Railway station in Belgrade, Serbia

Beograd Centar Београд Центар
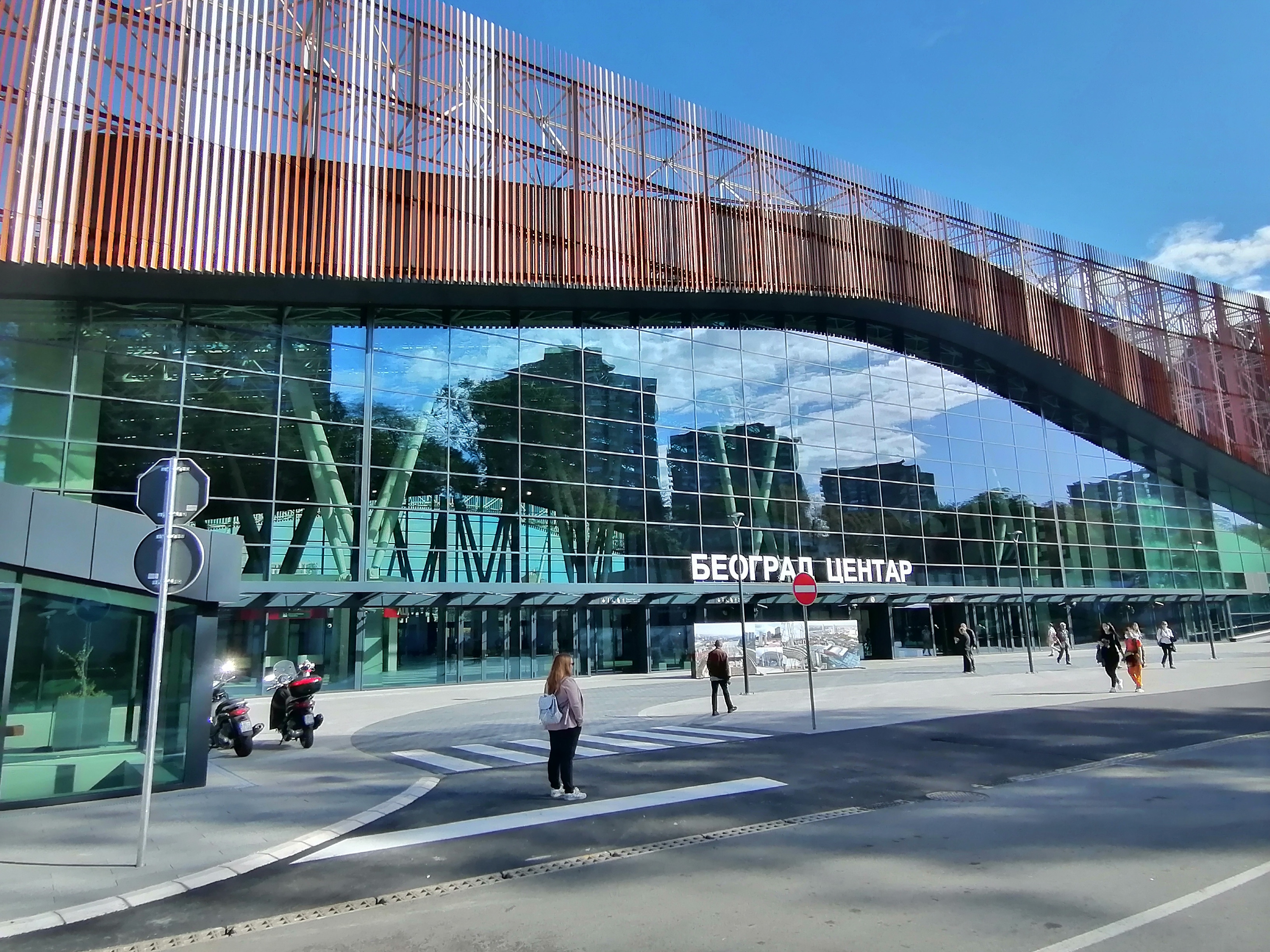

General information
- Location: Prokupačka St. Savski Venac, Belgrade; Serbia
- Coordinates: 44°47′37″N 20°27′14″E
- Owner: Serbian Railways Infrastructure
- Platforms: 5 operational (6 planned + 2 metro platforms planned)
- Tracks: 8 operational (10 planned + 2 metro tracks planned)
- Train operators: Srbijavoz
- Connections: buses and trolleybuses (direct, walking required): 34 - from Topčidersko brdo /Senjak/ to Pere Velimirovića; 36 - from and to Trg Slavija (circular); 38L - from Kosmaj Depot; 40 - from Zvezdara to Banjica II; 41 - from Studentski trg to Banjica II; 44 - from Topčidersko brdo /Senjak/ to Železnička stanica Dunav; 600 - to Aerodrom "Nikola Tesla"

Construction
- Structure type: At-grade
- Accessible: Yes

History
- Opened: 1974; 52 years ago (Partially); 7 July 1995; 31 years ago (Beovoz); 1 September 2010; 16 years ago (BG Voz); 10 December 2017; 8 years ago (Main national); 1 July 2018; 8 years ago (Central)

Services
Preceding station	BG Voz	Following station
New Belgrade towards Batajnica	Line 1	Karađorđe's Park towards Ovča
Rakovica towards Mladenovac	Line 3	Karađorđe's Park towards Ovča
New Belgrade towards Zemun	Line 2 (Zemun)	Rakovica towards Resnik
New Belgrade towards Zemun	Line 3 (Zemun)	Rakovica towards Mladenovac
New Belgrade towards Zemun	Line 4 (Zemun)	Rakovica towards Lazarevac
Preceding station	Srbijavoz	Following station
Terminus	Re (Regio)	New Belgrade towards Novi Sad
Terminus	Re (Regio)	New Belgrade towards Sremska Mitrovica
Terminus	Re (Regio)	New Belgrade towards Šid
Terminus	Re (Regio)	Rakovica towards Niš
New Belgrade towards Zemun	Re (Regio)	Rakovica towards Niš
New Belgrade towards Zemun	Re (Regio)	Karađorđe's Park towards Pančevo Vojlovica
New Belgrade towards Zemun	Re (Regio)	Karađorđe's Park towards Vršac
New Belgrade towards Zemun	Re (Regio)	Rakovica towards Lapovo
New Belgrade towards Zemun	Re (Regio)	Karađorđe's Park towards Valjevo
New Belgrade towards Zemun	Re (Regio)	Karađorđe's Park towards Prijepolje Teretna
Terminus	Rex (Regio Express)	Karađorđe's Park towards Novi Sad
Terminus	Rex (Regio Express)	Karađorđe's Park towards Šid
Terminus	Brzi (Fast train)	Karađorđe's Park towards Mali Zvornik
Terminus	Brzi (Fast train)	Rakovica towards Bar, Montenegro
New Belgrade towards Zemun	Brzi (Fast train)	Rakovica towards Bar, Montenegro
New Belgrade towards Zemun	Brzi (Fast train)	Valjevo towards Užice
New Belgrade towards Zemun	Brzi (Fast train)	Rakovica towards Niš
Terminus	Soko	New Belgrade towards Novi Sad
Location
- Location within Belgrade

The Belgrade Centre Railway Station (Serbian: Железничка станица Београд Центар, romanized: Železnička stanica Beograd Centar), colloquially known as Prokop (Serbian Cyrillic: Прокоп), is the new central railway station in Belgrade, Serbia. The station is located in the Belgrade municipality of Savski Venac. Although unfinished, it serves as de facto main railway station of the city, after replacing the old main station at the Belgrade Waterfront.

The unsuccessful, decades-long attempted construction of the new central railway station of Belgrade was hampered by a lack of funding to finish the adjoining 14 km of tunnels, several railway bridges including the New Railroad Bridge across the Sava river, a new road network connecting to the city and technical installations. Construction of the new station faced countless setbacks over a period of several decades. The entire construction process has been described as infamous, with deadlines being missed one after another.

Belgrade Centre station was opened on 26 January 2016, serving two daily trains to Novi Sad, as well as BG Voz, Belgrade's commuter railways. Following gradual re-routing, it gained its current role on 1 July 2018. Today, the station links Belgrade to Vršac, Sremska Mitrovica, Šid, Valjevo, Požega, Užice, Niš, the Montenegrin cities of Podgorica and Bar, as well as Novi Sad via a high-speed intercity route and other cities. It is also served by the primary variations of BG Voz's lines 1 and 3.

However, the station is poorly connected to the rest of the city, being reached by just four city lines. They include line 36 (GSP Belgrade) to Savski Trg and Slavija, as well as bus route 600 (GSP Belgrade) to the Belgrade Bus Station in New Belgrade and the Belgrade Nikola Tesla Airport. Three more lines - trolleybuses 40 and 41, as well bus 44 - stop near the station, but all require walking.

== Construction ==
=== History ===
==== Beginning ====
The ill-fated construction of the new railway station, which was supposed to replace the Belgrade Main railway station in Savamala, was to last for decades. Originally, in the late 1960s, it was supposed to be constructed near the present interchange of Autokomanda, but the idea was suddenly dropped, and one of the major architectural authorities at the time, Branko Žeželj, picked Prokop instead, which ultimately left the Autokomanda interchange unfinished — the exit in the Niš direction was only finished in 2007. The idea was presented publicly in February 1970. It also included the removal of all tracks from the Savamala (Sava Amphitheatre) and of the now Former Belgrade Main railway station, while the location along the river was to be turned into vast green spaces. The city council adopted the decision to build the new station in March 1971. The Council for Urbanism drafted the projected construction of the new railway station later that year. The project was monumental and expensive, without precedent in Yugoslavia. It was envisioned to be "large enough for the entire 21st century" with 10,000 commuters passing through it per hour. Because of that, including the seemingly unrealistic deadline of only 18 months, the council session after which the plan was greenlighted was very turbulent and lasted for 7.5 hours. In 1974 the design project was finished, preparatory works officially started on 3 December 1976, and full construction began on 8 October 1977. The station building was planned to have a bird-shaped roof, with 8 platforms and 11 tracks.

The deadline for completion was 1 May 1979, but the rapidly deteriorating economic situation in Yugoslavia at the time slowed construction and the project was halted in 1980. In May 1984, the notion of abandoning the project altogether, due to its high cost, was officially considered for the first time. Construction resumed in 1990 and over the next few years was stopped and restarted several times. The project itself was simplified. In 1996 a new contract was signed with the Energoprojekt company. Serbian President Slobodan Milošević and Prime Minister Mirko Marjanović officially opened the construction of the concrete roof slab on 7 July 1996, which was mostly finished in 1999, but the building was halted again due to the NATO bombing of Serbia and lack of funds.

==== Restart ====
In 2005, an international competition was held to find a strategic partner who would finish the station and acquire rights to build and sell commercial facilities on the site. The Hungarian company TriGranit was chosen, but in 2008, TriGranit was dismissed and the contract with Energoprojekt from 1996 was reactivated. Energoprojekt came second in the public tender but still was chosen. As the works were to last for 14 months, 2010 was set as the final deadline, but no progress was made due to the lack of funds. Also, this project excluded the construction in the commercial area. In 2012, a €25.8 million loan was granted by the Kuwait Fund for Arab Economic Development, and on 3 December 2014 work was resumed, with Energoprojekt as the lead company of the construction consortium, being chosen again after the bidding. The work was expected to be completed in 14 months, and the station was officially opened on 26 January 2016 by prime minister Aleksandar Vučić. However, the new station was not used to capacity and was basically still just one of a dozen secondary stations in Belgrade.

On 10 December 2017, all but three of the domestic lines were transferred from the Main Station to Prokop. International trains continued using Main Station, because Belgrade Centre was still not completed. In December 2017, the station had no station building or any commercial facilities, two tracks and the roof above them were still not finished, and the road connections to the rest of the city were only half completed. The Ministry of Construction estimated that, if the funds were granted, the entire work could be finished in two years.

==== Central Station ====
In January 2018 it was announced that the old station would be completely closed for traffic on 1 July 2018, even though none of the projects needed for a complete removal of the railway traffic are finished. While Prokop is incomplete, a projected main goods station in Zemun is not being adapted while there are also no projects on the Belgrade railway ring line. A series of temporary solutions have had to be applied, including the defunct and deteriorated Topčider railway station which was temporarily revitalized and adapted for auto trains. The major flaw remained a poor public transportation connection, so the railway company made an official request for this problem to be solved. It was also announced in January 2018 that the official deadline for the construction of the station building in Prokop would be two years, however, there were no funds for it at the time. A second part of the Kuwaiti loan (€50 million) was not approved and the needed public procurements would not be finished until the end of 2018. The central freight station in Zemun also had a deadline of two years, but the works were scheduled to start at the end of 2018. This meant that the planned Belgrade railway junction would not be finished before 2021, at best. However, the minister for transportation Zorana Mihajlović gave conflicting deadlines in December 2017. She said that the station building in Prokop would be built from April 2018 to April 2019 and that the freight station at Zemun should be finished by the end of 2018.

Only the access road from the direction of the Bulevar Kralja Aleksandra Karađorđevića was finished in 2018. Until mid-2022, the station lacked a 9,000 m^{2} (97,000 sq ft) section of roof and the platforms beneath it, the main building itself, and the access road to the highway. Trains from Bar, Montenegro began to terminate at Centar instead of Topčider by December 2021.

An additional 3,800 m^{2} (41,000 sq ft) of roof was finished in December 2018 after 8 months of works, so now some 40,000 m^{2} (430,000 sq ft) out of planned 45,000 m^{2} (480,000 sq ft) was completed. The authorities again refused to disclose the date of full completion of the entire station complex. It was evident at this point that the works on the station building would not start in 2018, and the missing tracks for two additional platforms were not laid. No progress was made on the Zemun freight station.

Though itself inadequately equipped, the Novi Beograd railway station initially took over the de facto role of the city's main station after the closing of the old one, as it is better connected with other parts of the city and much more accessible than the Prokop. By early 2019 it emerged as one of the city's busiest stations. As for Prokop itself, when the traffic was rerouted in July 2018, it was announced that the station would operate 195 lines: 16 international, 56 local, and 123 communal BG Voz lines. By February 2019 only 60 lines remained operational: 1 international, 24 regional, and 35 local.

As it became apparent that the Kuwaiti loan would not be available, in July 2019 the government announced a public tendering process for the partner who would build the station's main building, commercial facilities, and parking lots. Even though the present project for the station was accepted by the government in 2015, the future partner would be allowed to present its own design. Though the government had claimed since 2016 that numerous domestic and foreign companies were interested, by October 2019 only one had applied - Railway City Belgrade, a Dutch-Bulgarian company recently registered in Serbia. In April 2020 it was announced that the talks with Railway City Belgrade were in the "final phase", but without any specifications on the price or timeline. It was stated, however, that the concrete roof slab will be finished first, then the urban project will be drafted, followed by the new re-parceling. That means the entire 2015 urban plan was scrapped, while the works on the station's building cannot start before the second half of 2021 and will be finished in 2023 in the best-case scenario.

In May 2020 construction of the remaining roof slab continued, with the deadline set for the summer of 2021. After the roof is finished, the remaining two tracks beneath it, numbers 1 and 2, will be finished. In the meantime, the framework agreement with the Railway City Belgrade company was announced. It was not binding, and the company planned to first survey the bearing capacity of the roof slab in order to see how much can be built on it, and to determine how much commercial space beside the station's building can be built before they accept the job.

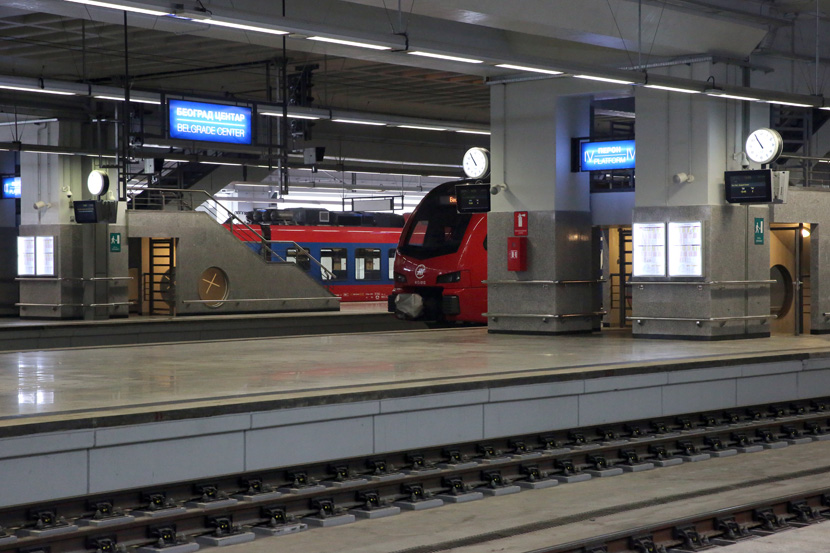
Prokop station platforms, 2016

Mihajlović's successor, the new minister for transportation Tomislav Momirović, visited the site in December 2020 and stated that there was still much work to be done, but reconfirmed dates of August 2021 for the completion of the roof slab, and end of 2023 for full completion. Design of the new station building, the work of PFB Dizajn, was made public in January 2021. The start was planned for the fall of 2021, the deadline for the building was the end of 2022, and for the entire complex (commercial venues, parking lots, etc.) by the end of 2024. The contractor also stated that everything depends on the state of the roof slab, which is not fully finished. The finished section was surveyed, showing that reconstruction is needed as it is not strong enough for the planned construction on top of it.

Works on the roof slab were halted again when a previously unknown tunnel was discovered under Prokupačka Street. At 2 metres (6 ft 7 in) tall and 3 metres (9.8 ft) wide, the pedestrian tunnel forked in two directions toward Steco restaurant and Slavija Square. Electric cables of unknown purpose were also discovered in the tunnel. This discovery prompted revisions of the project, and moving the deadline to the spring of 2022. Finishing of the roof slab was then moved to August 2022, construction of the station building was planned to start in October 2022, and it was estimated that a further €70 million would be needed for the full completion.

In late March 2022, a major milestone for the Serbian Railways was the launch of the first Serbian high speed rail connection between Belgrade Centre and Novi Sad railway station.

After completion of the roof slab over platforms 1 and 2, the construction of the station building and commercial centre officially began on 8 August 2022, as the public-private partnership of the Serbian Railways Infrastructure and the private company Railway City Belgrade. The deadline for the completion of the construction works is now set for November 2023, followed by the furnishing of the building. The construction of two missing platforms was moved. The entire station complex will be named "Gate of Serbia". Apart from the station building itself, the complex will include twelve commercial buildings (four should be finished by the summer of 2024), a series of parking lots, and a garage. The entire complex will be finished in 2026.

Old works did not fit into the new project, which now divided the complex in two: the station itself (at point 85), and the commercial Railway City Belgrade-operated section (after point 105). Previous concrete construction on the slab itself was demolished, purportedly with great care so as not to cause damage to the platforms below, especially in regard to the leaks. However, starting in November 2022, the platforms were flooded after every heavy rain. Ten elevators were added during the construction, as the project's original terms of reference excluded any lifts. The façade is a combination of glass curtain wall and aluminum brise soleils. In May 2023, one of the contractors announced that the building will be completely finished on 20 October 2023.

== Criticism ==
The construction of the Belgrade Waterfront and track removal in Savamala and apparent pressure to finish the work before the expiration of the deadline, contributed to the hastily done job. Basically, no other facilities were built except for the tracks. The roof was unfinished and due to rain and wind the platforms on the periphery are covered in water. Access roads were not completed either and Prokop is generally badly connected with other parts of Belgrade. Regarding how distant the station is from downtown, its official name, Belgrade Center, is often mocked and ignored by the citizens and passengers who almost without exception call it Prokop.

Member of the Serbian Academy of Sciences and Arts and a public transport expert, Vukan Vučić, labeled Prokop as the "most disastrous error in Belgrade transportation". He asserted that Prokop, in functional terms, is not a station at all and that, despite having been named Belgrade Centre, it is actually further from the city's centre than the old station was. He added that the location is a neglected, desperately bad choice and topographically inaccessible from all sides. As a result, commuters need almost 20 minutes to leave the station upon their arrival and have to travel for 3 to 4 km (1.9 to 2.5 mi) to downtown to reach other public transport routes as Prokop itself is not interconnected. Another member of the Academy, transport engineer Dušan Teodorović, also criticized the project. As none of the planned infrastructure has been built – urbanization and development of the neighborhood, numerous shops, hotels, excellent commuting connections, two metro lines, taxi station – Vučić maintains that the isolation of the location will directly bring to the further decrease in the number of railway passengers.

Those who participated in the planning of the station maintain that Prokop was the best solution and that the problem is that other parts of the plan were not carried out or have been dropped completely. They say that the idea was to have only through stations in the city and not a terminus station. Some of the missing infrastructure which they named, and which were considered megalomaniacal to begin with by critics, includes three additional railway stations (new or expanded: New Belgrade, Zemun, South), two additional bus stations (South, East) and lengthening and widening of the Deligradska Street from its current end at the highway, including the demolition of the urbanized hill of Maleško Brdo, east of Prokop.

Despite numerous major drawbacks of the station, minister Mihajlović stated in July 2018 that the priority in Prokop was "elevators and escalators", but none of the elevators were installed by December 2018. Construction of two elevators began in February 2019 and they became operational in June 2019.

=== Controversies ===
In the late 1990s, instigated by first lady Mirjana Marković, an initiative was started to build a Chinese commercial centre in Prokop, in order to enhance economic cooperation and trade between China and Serbia.

Supervisor Dragan Dobrašinović, who reported to the Financial Board of the National Assembly of Serbia, said that procedures for the 2014 reconstruction were "distinctively political" due to the pushing of the Belgrade Waterfront project. He also pointed out that the projected price was inflated by over 5.5 million euros, as the estimate was 20.25 million and the loan was 25.8 million euros. The Assembly's Board accepted Dobrašinović's report, but dismissed him and no legal proceedings followed.

When it was announced that the Kuwaitis would grant the loan, Serbian authorities published a computer model of what the future station building would look like. It turned out to be a picture of the Hong Kong's West Kowloon Terminus, set against Belgrade as a background. The 2009 project is the work of the Aedas company and architect Andrew Bromberg who personally reacted to the plagiarism.

In January 2021, Transparency Serbia and other organizations reported that the procedure where the company Railway City Belgrade was selected as the contractor for the station's building was against the law. State Property Office refuted the claim, saying that, in this specific case, different laws are applied. The prosecutor's office declined to act upon Transparency's complaint. When petitioned by Transparency to disclose on which documents they rejected to act, the prosecution responded there is no "legitimate interest for public to know" and that it is only "personal petitioner's interest" to know the information.

The city decided to build additional residential buildings in March 2021, as part of the wider railway station complex. The selected lot used to be a green space, until the temporary worker's quarters were built there in the 1990s when the construction of the station was resumed. They were abandoned after 2005, and the local residents wanted to bring back greenery, plant trees, and build a children's playground. The tenants' associations of the buildings in the vicinity of the planned construction coordinated against the project, and the city responded that "nothing is definite yet". In October 2021, the city announced plans to build 37,000 square metres (400,000 sq ft) of commercial and residential space at this location. The total area of 1.8 hectares (4.4 acres) will be filled with high-rise buildings up to 80 metres (260 ft) tall. The investor is also the Railway City Belgrade company. Local residents continually organized protests, opposing the construction of tall buildings. In December 2021, the city announced the withdrawal of the project due to the "accepted citizens' complaints", and as the construction could "indeed trigger massive waste again", though reporters connected the decision with the upcoming Belgrade elections in April 2022. The existing structure on the lot will be adapted into the communal center in 2022.

In November 2022 the city announced that it had awarded another lot, in Block No. 40 in New Belgrade, to Railway City Belgrade as compensation for the scrapped plans for additional skyscrapers in Prokop. The area of the lot is smaller, 1.06 ha (2.6 acres) compared to 1.8 ha (4.4 acres), but the total floor area of two planned buildings (one residential, one commercial), remained the same at 38,000 m^{2} (410,000 sq ft). The company is obliged to finish the station in Prokop first before it can build anything in New Belgrade.

=== Assessment ===
Due to the countless setbacks over the period of several decades, the construction of the new station has been called Skadar na Bojani, after the folk epic poem The Building of Skadar, where the town of Skadar was unsuccessfully built over a long time. With all its inadequacies (bad interconnection, lack of the stationary building, planned omission from the first subway line), and for decades still the unfulfilled task of representing a "construction pride of modern Belgrade Railway junction", by June 2021 it was noted that the term "Central" in the station's name is simply irritating to passengers.

Continuously hindered by numerous problems and bad positioning, by 2022 it became apparent that Prokop would never take the role of the former Main railway station, as the New Belgrade railway station had already taken over as the busiest station in the entire country, with future plans to expand it into the central traffic hub in Belgrade. The New Belgrade railway station, though itself inadequately equipped, initially took over the role of the main station, as it was better connected with other parts of the city and way more accessible than the Prokop, and by early 2019 came out as one of the busiest stations.

In March 2022, the transportation minister Tomislav Momirović confirmed that the New Belgrade railway station "will remain" the busiest one, not only in Belgrade but in the entire Serbia. At the time, the majority of passengers on the inaugural trip via the high-speed railway line used the New Belgrade station, not Prokop. Being held back in almost every department, by this time it became apparent that, though it may become an important station in the future, Prokop will never take the role of the former Main railway station. Construction of the New Belgrade main bus station next to the New Belgrade railway station shows that the decision was to make the New Belgrade station part of the future central transportation hub in Belgrade. Adding to the further sidelining of Prokop are changes in the metro project. After decades of plans which included Prokop as a part of the first metro line, the government changed it so that none of the first two planned lines will reach Prokop.

== Image gallery ==
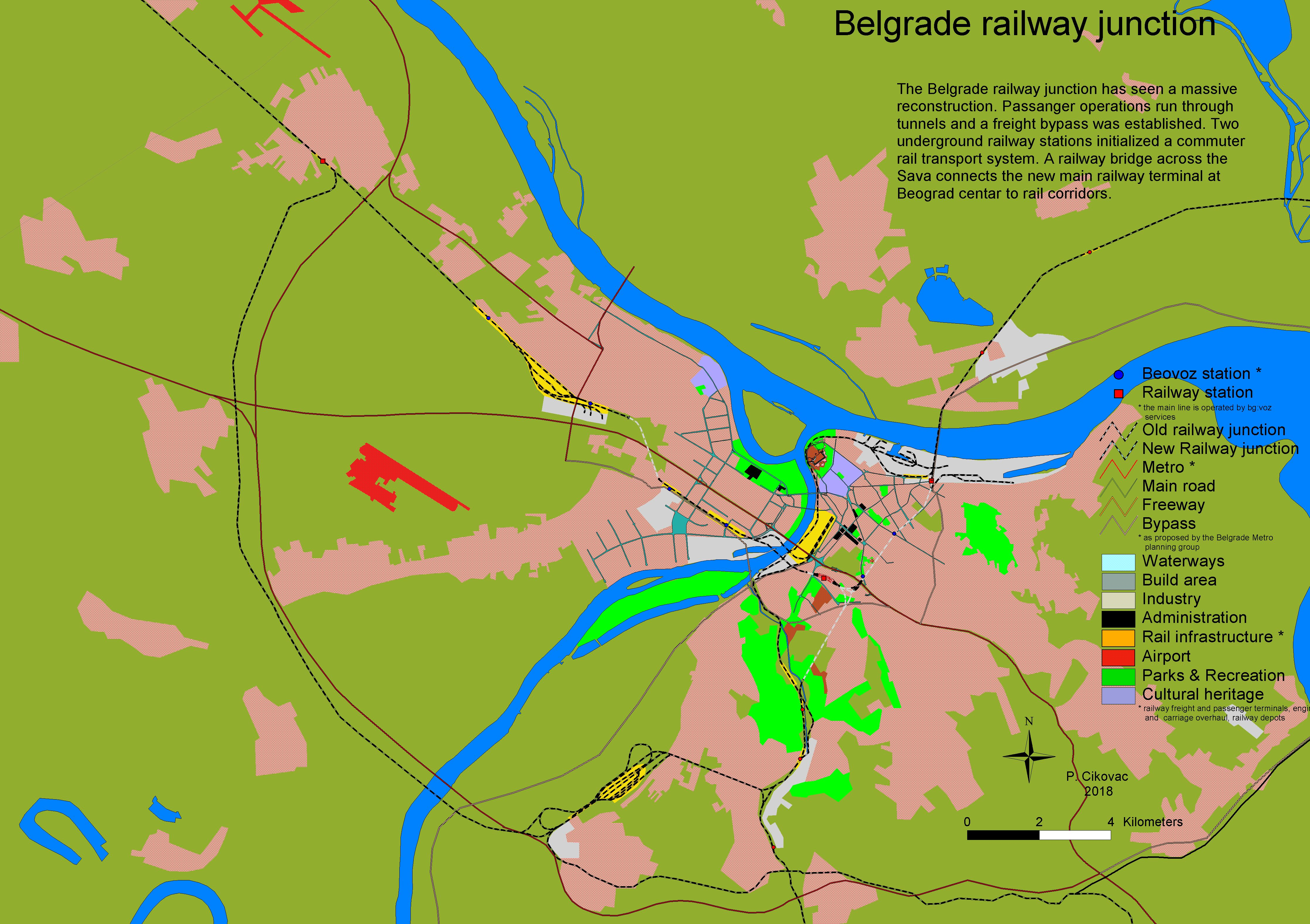
Location of the Belgrade Centre (Prokop) station in the railway junction.

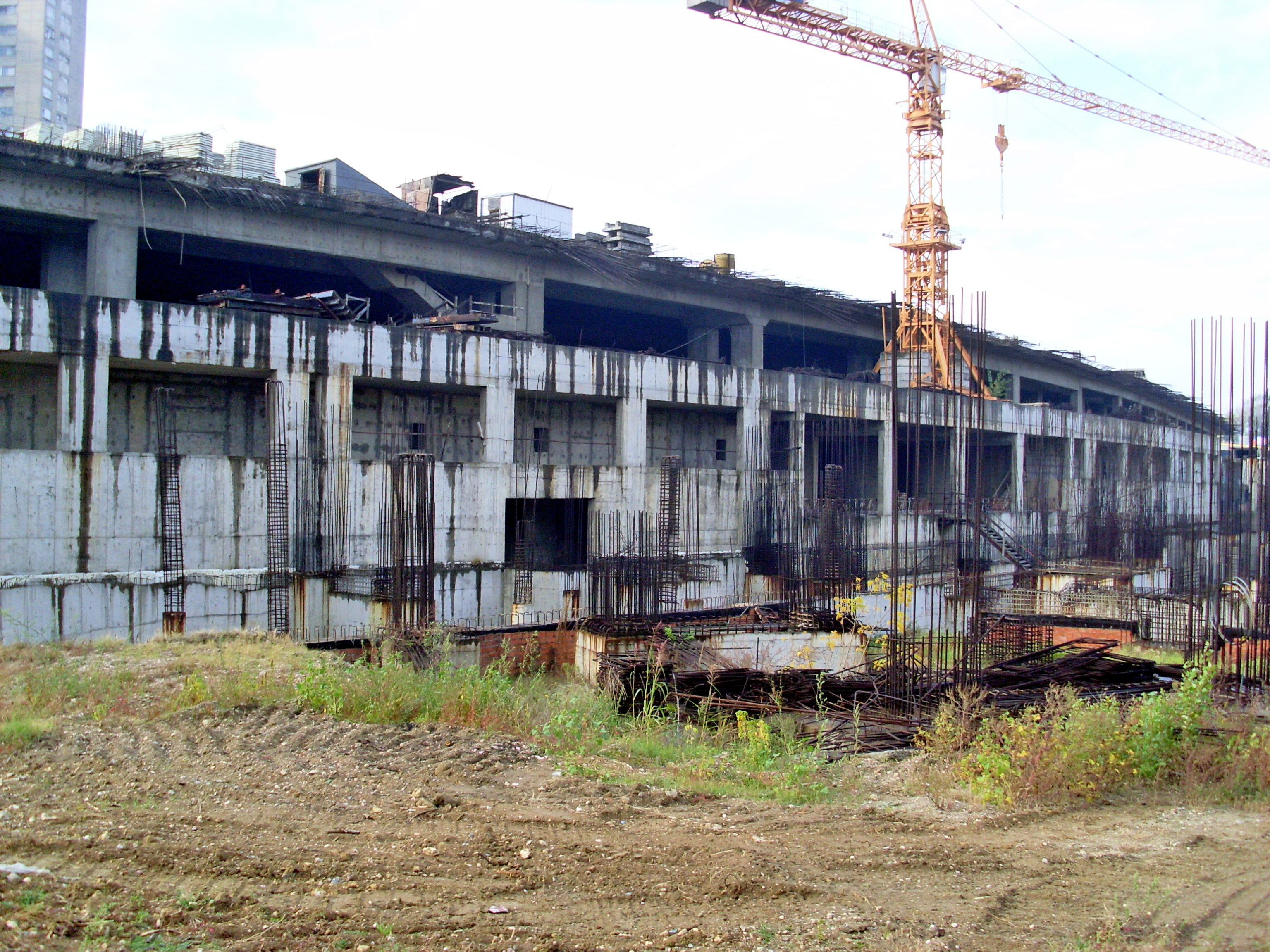
Construction of the station in October 2008.

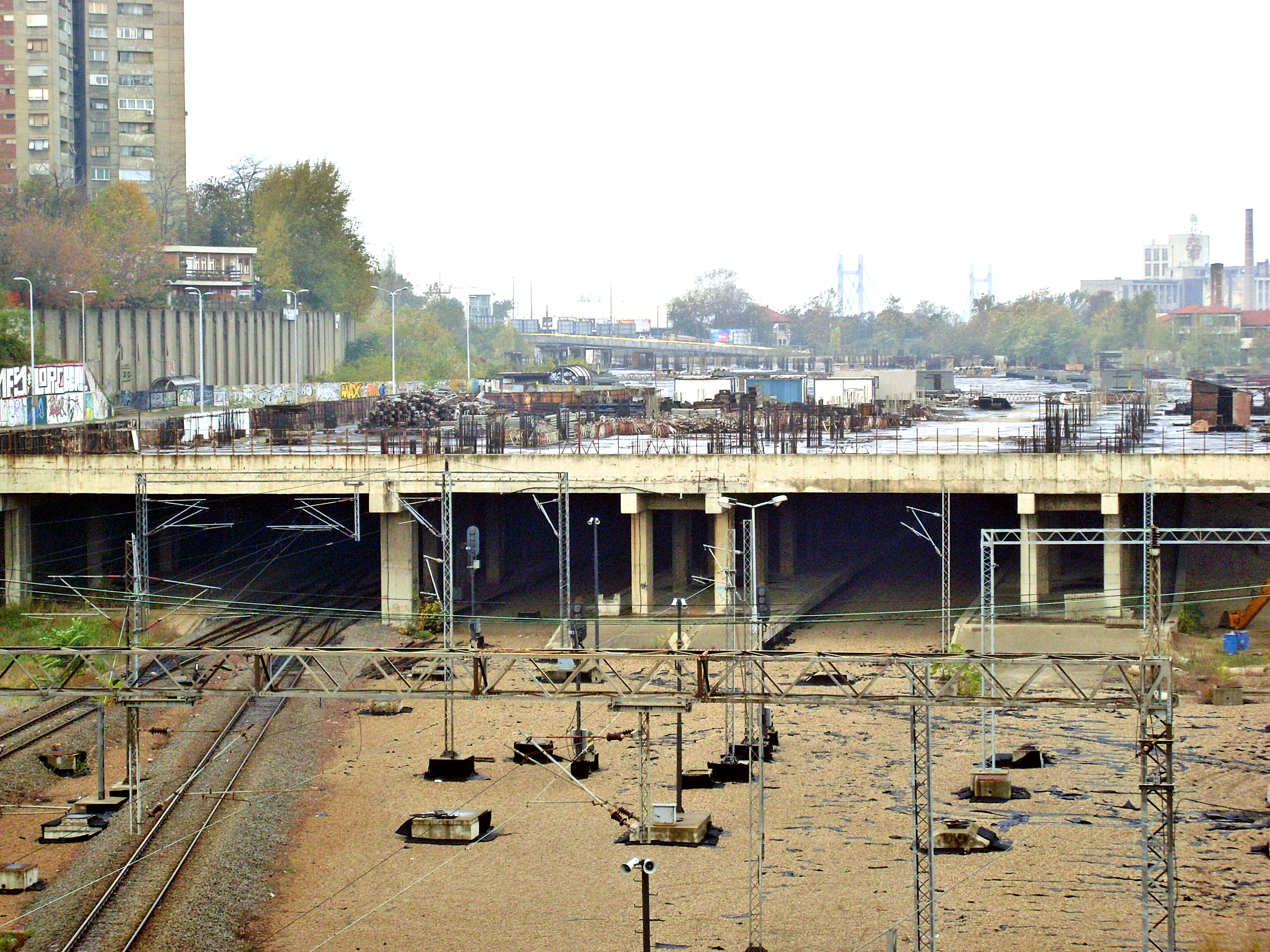
East view of Prokop the Belgrade main railway station

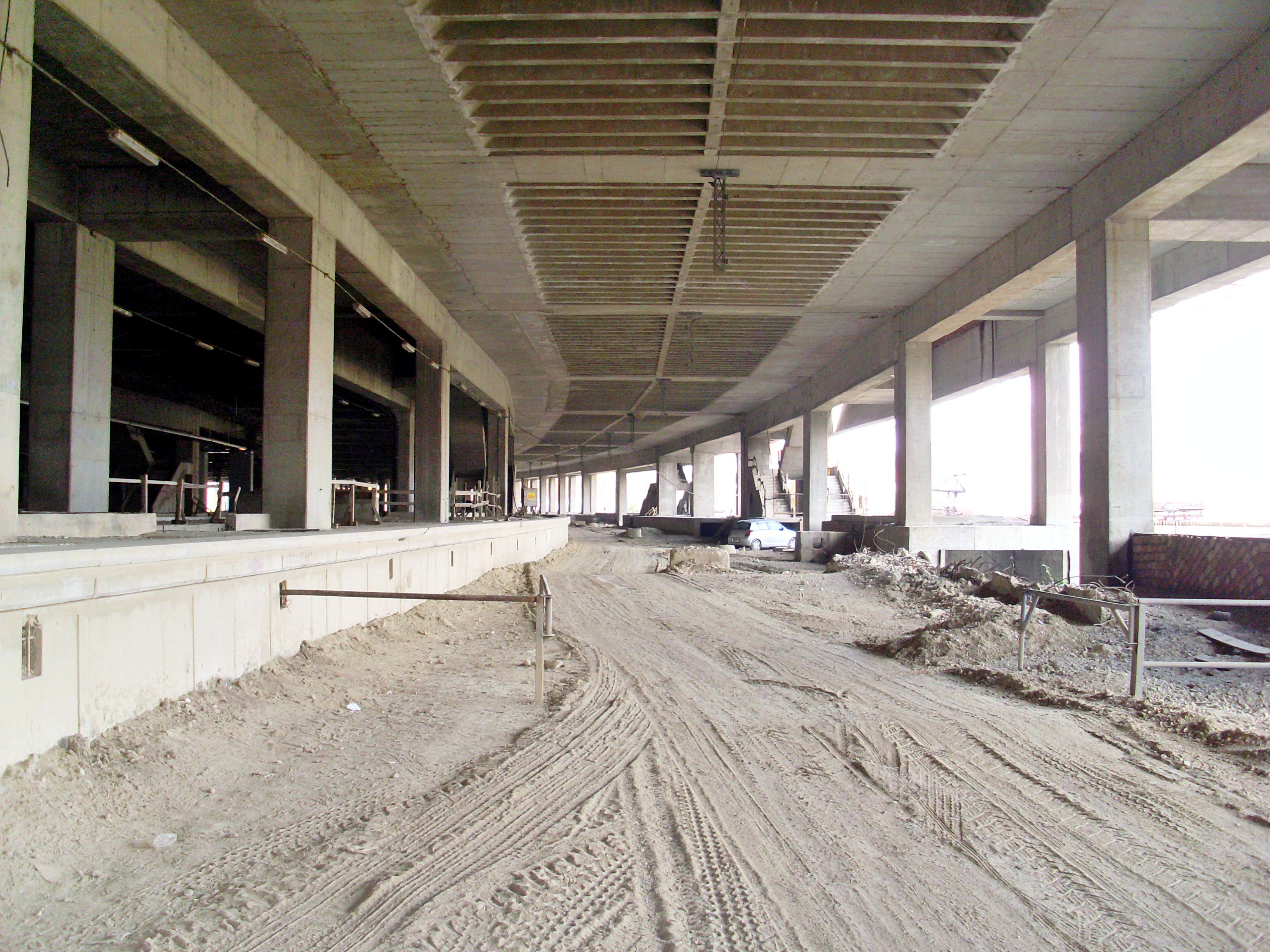
Belgrade's new railway station Prokop under construction as of 2008

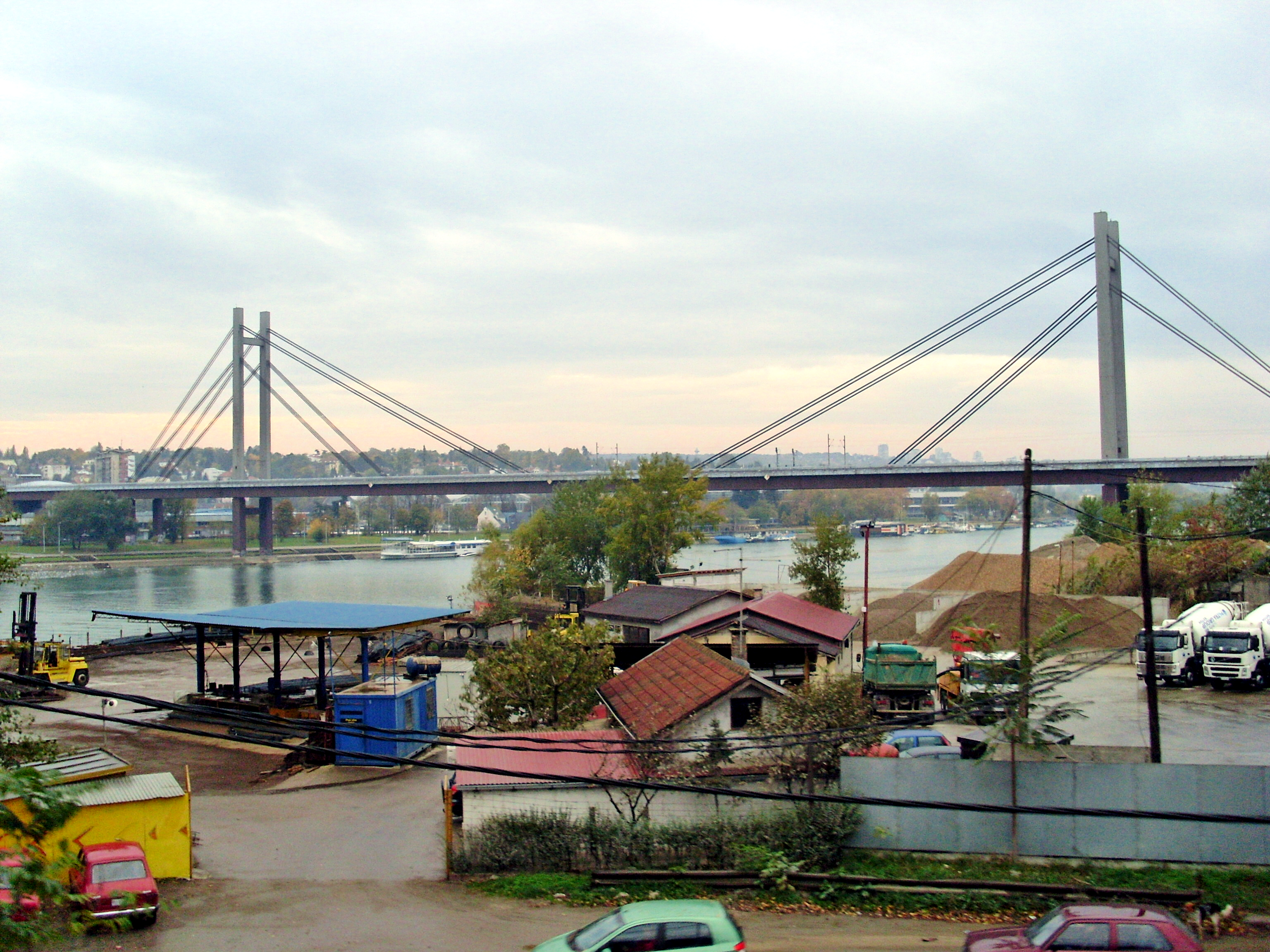
New Railway Bridge, finished 1979, part of the Belgrade railway junction

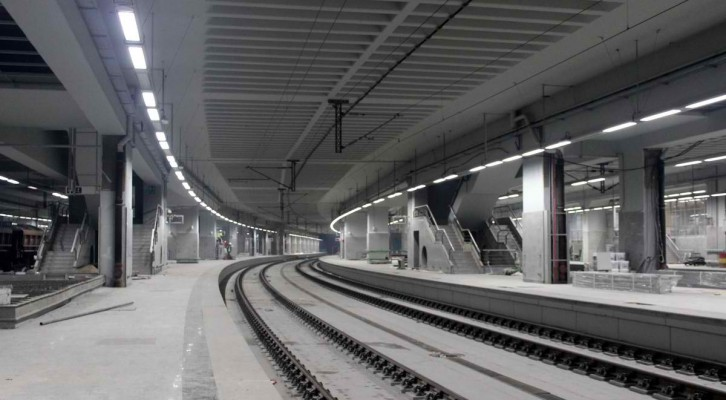
Prokop station in Belgrade 2016.

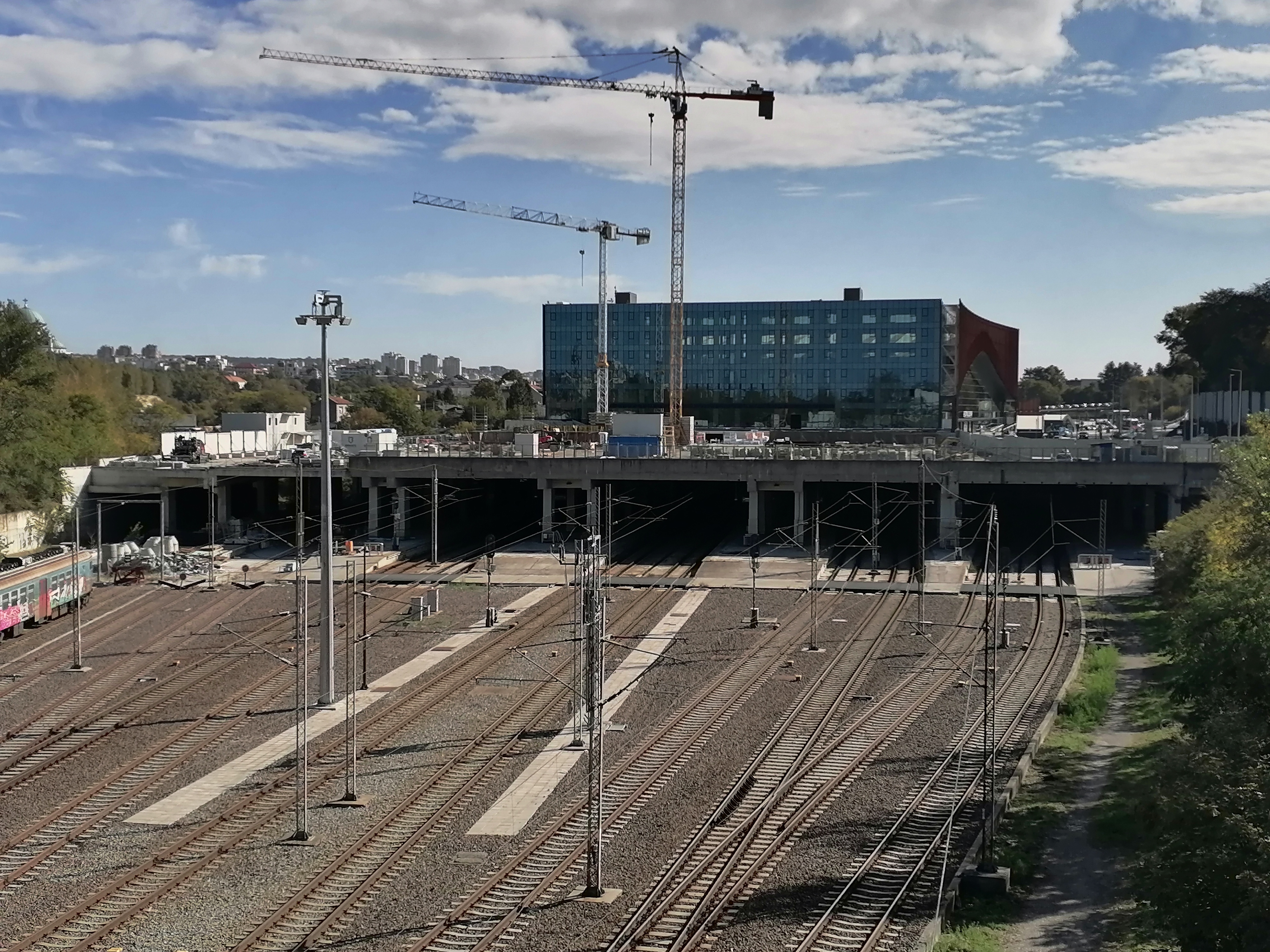
Exterior of the Centre station in Belgrade in October 2023.

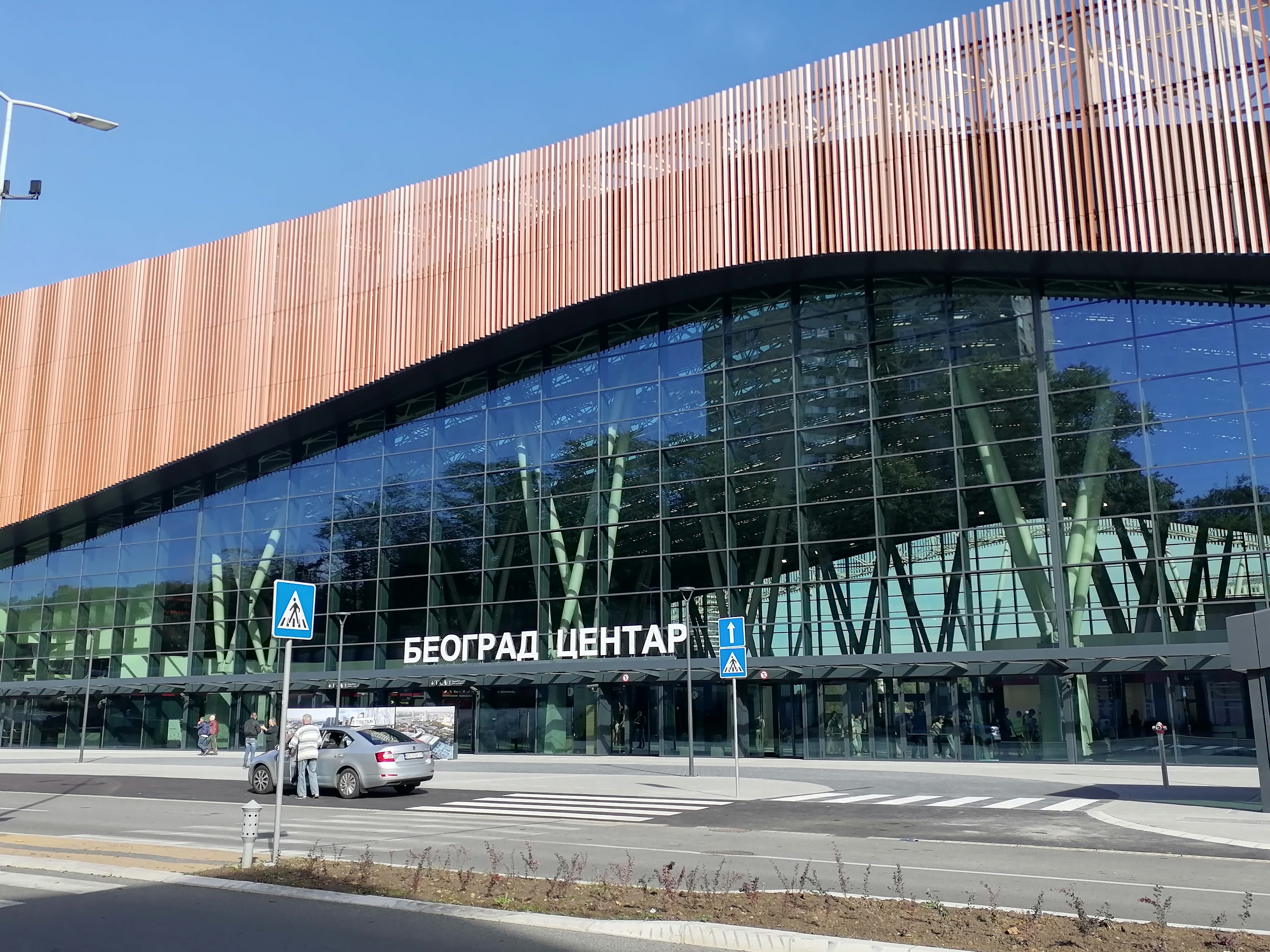
Exterior of the Centre station in Belgrade in October 2023.

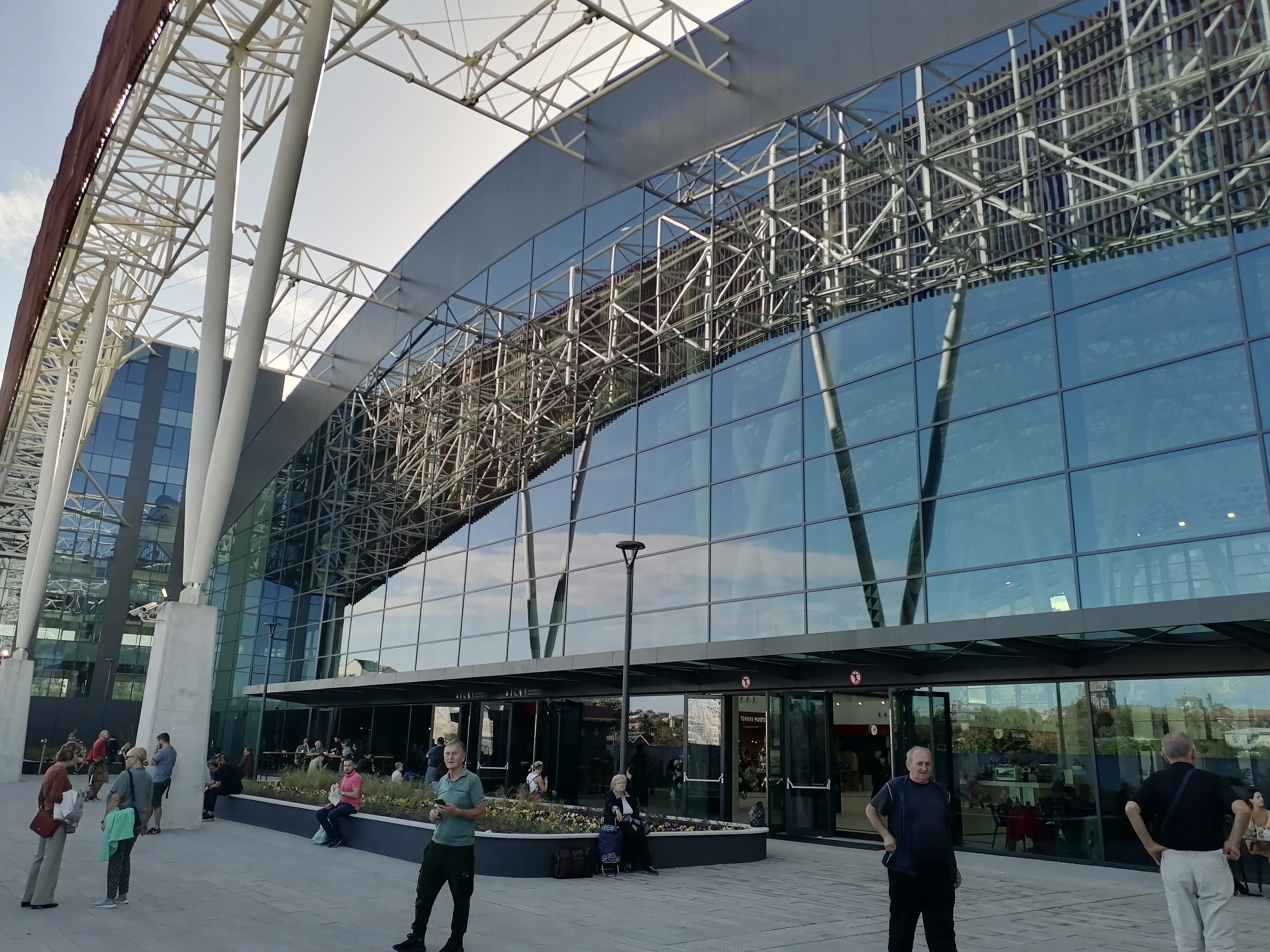
Interior of the Centre station in Belgrade in October 2023.

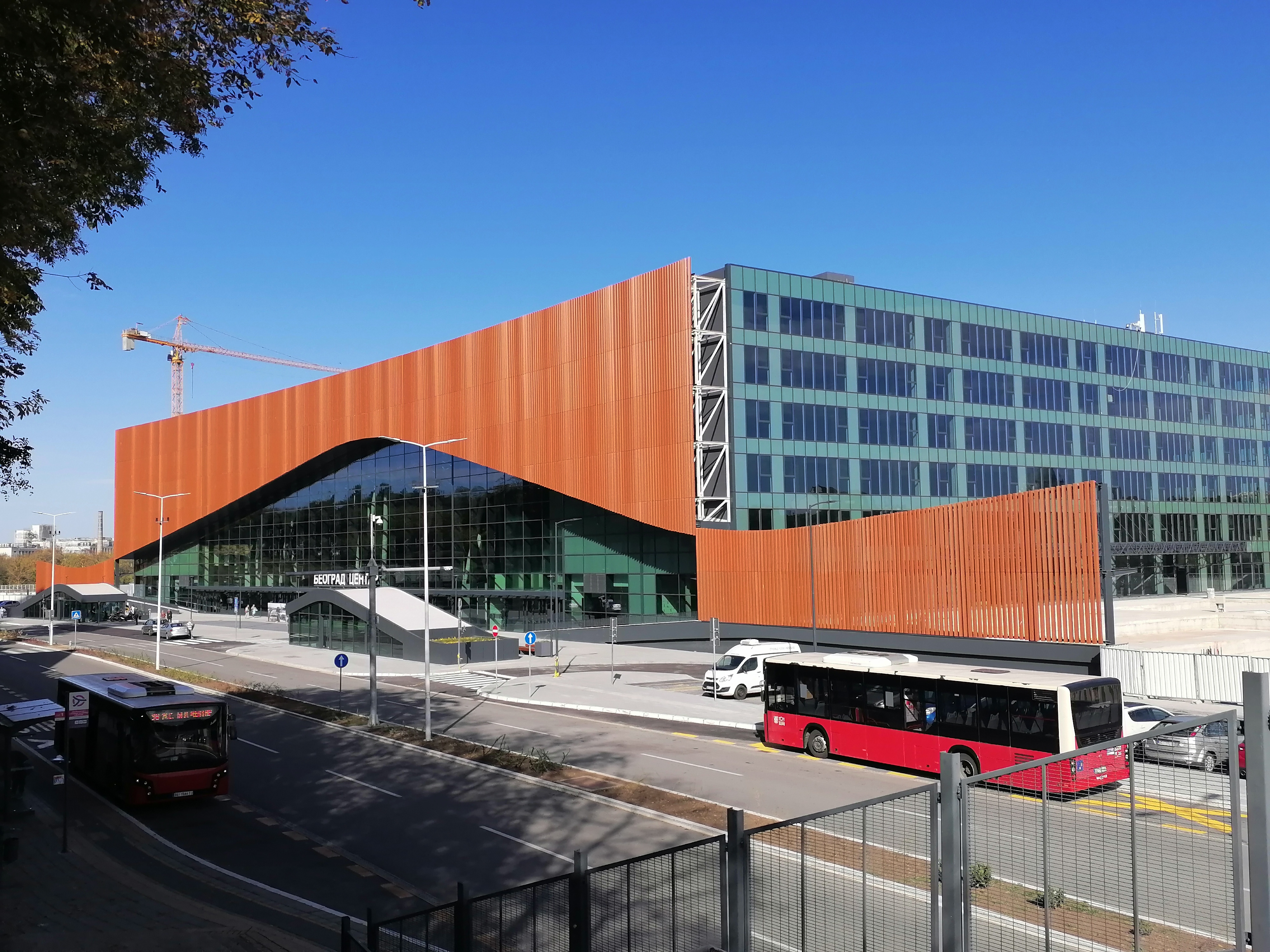
Exterior of the Centre station in Belgrade in October 2023.

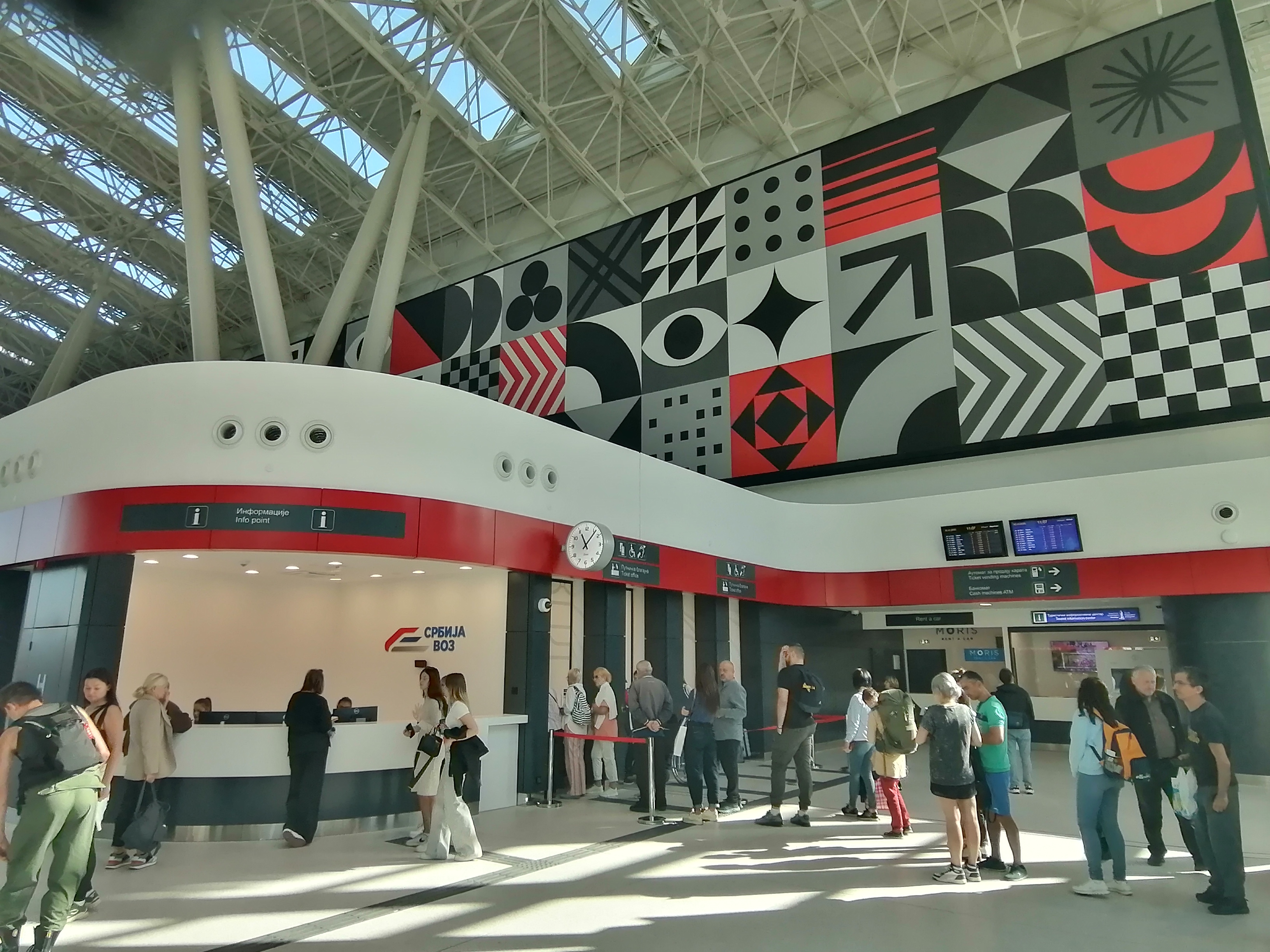
Interior of the Centre station in Belgrade in October 2023.

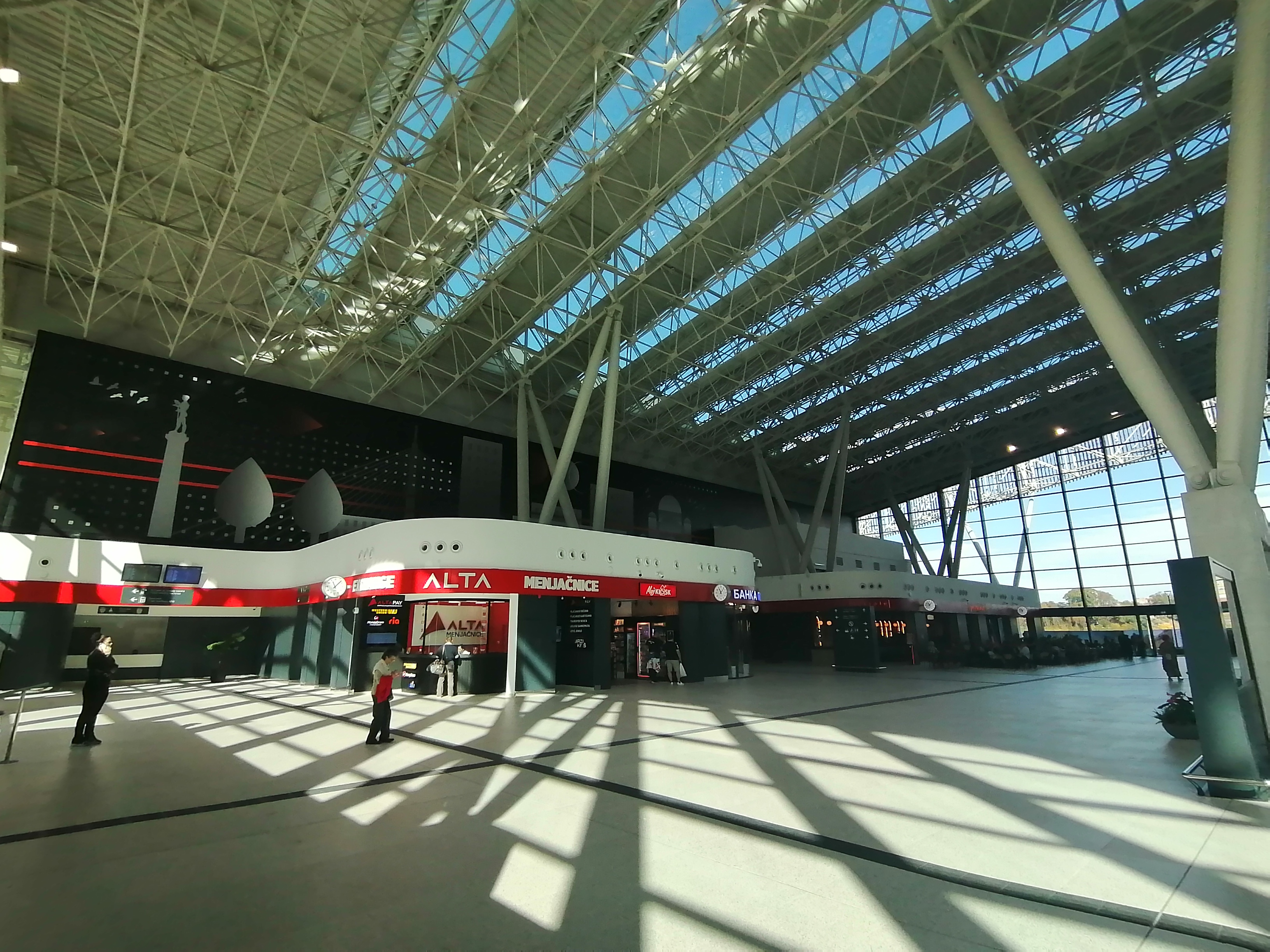
Interior of the Centre station in Belgrade in October 2023.

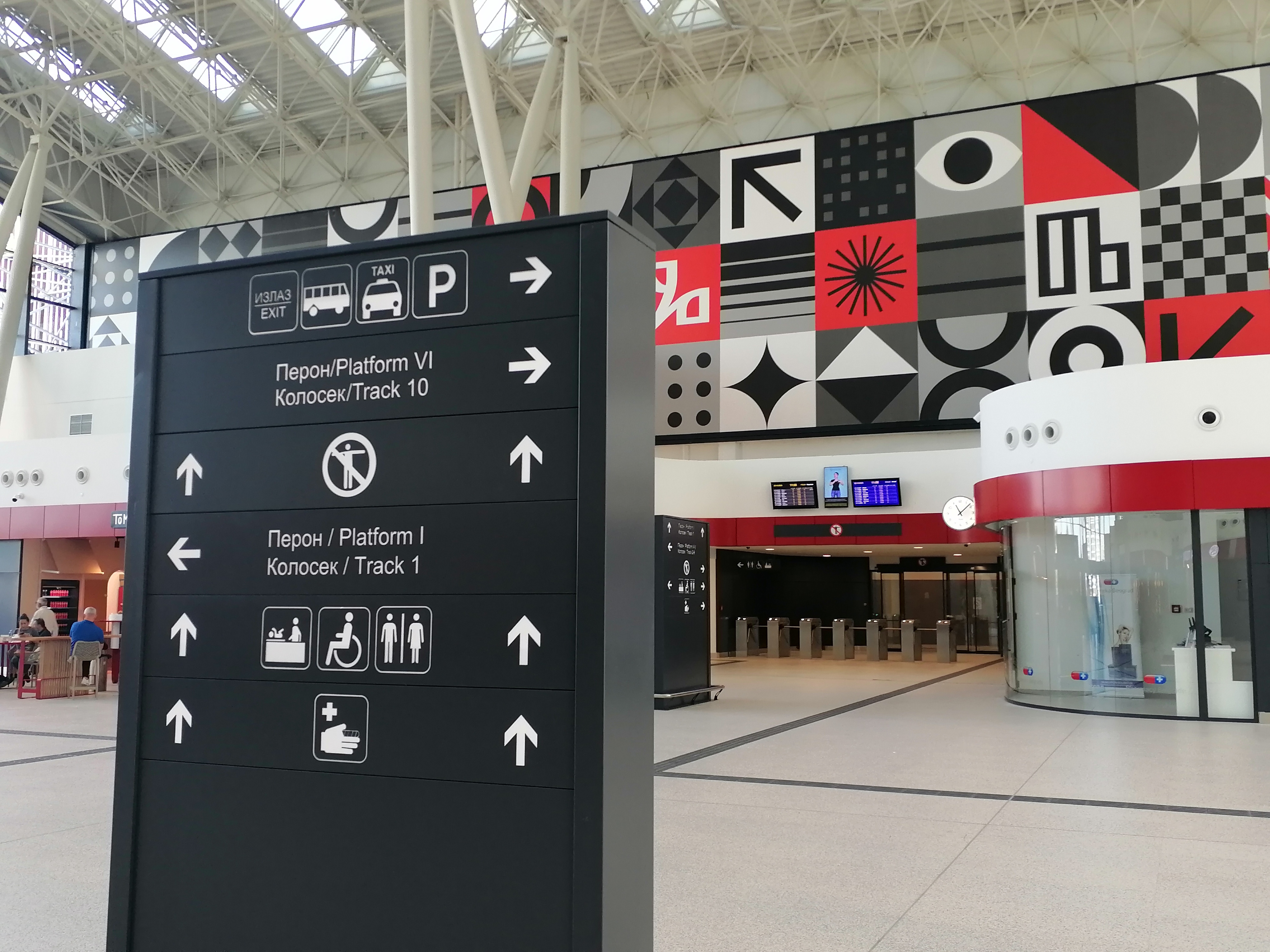
Interior of the Centre station in Belgrade in October 2023.

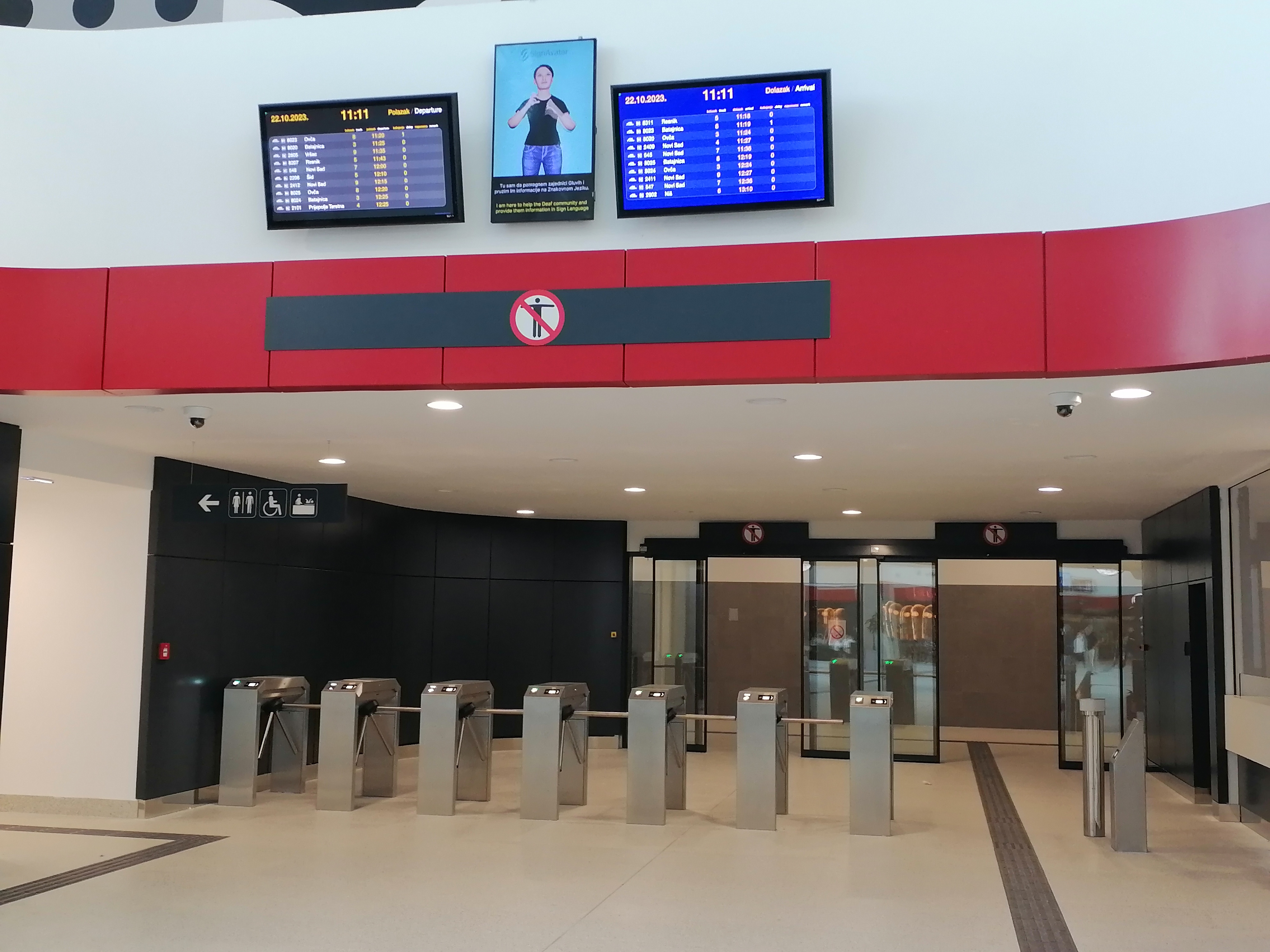
Interior of the Centre station in Belgrade in October 2023.

== See also ==
- Belgrade railway junction
