= Prokop, Belgrade =

Prokop Прокоп
- Urban neighbourhood
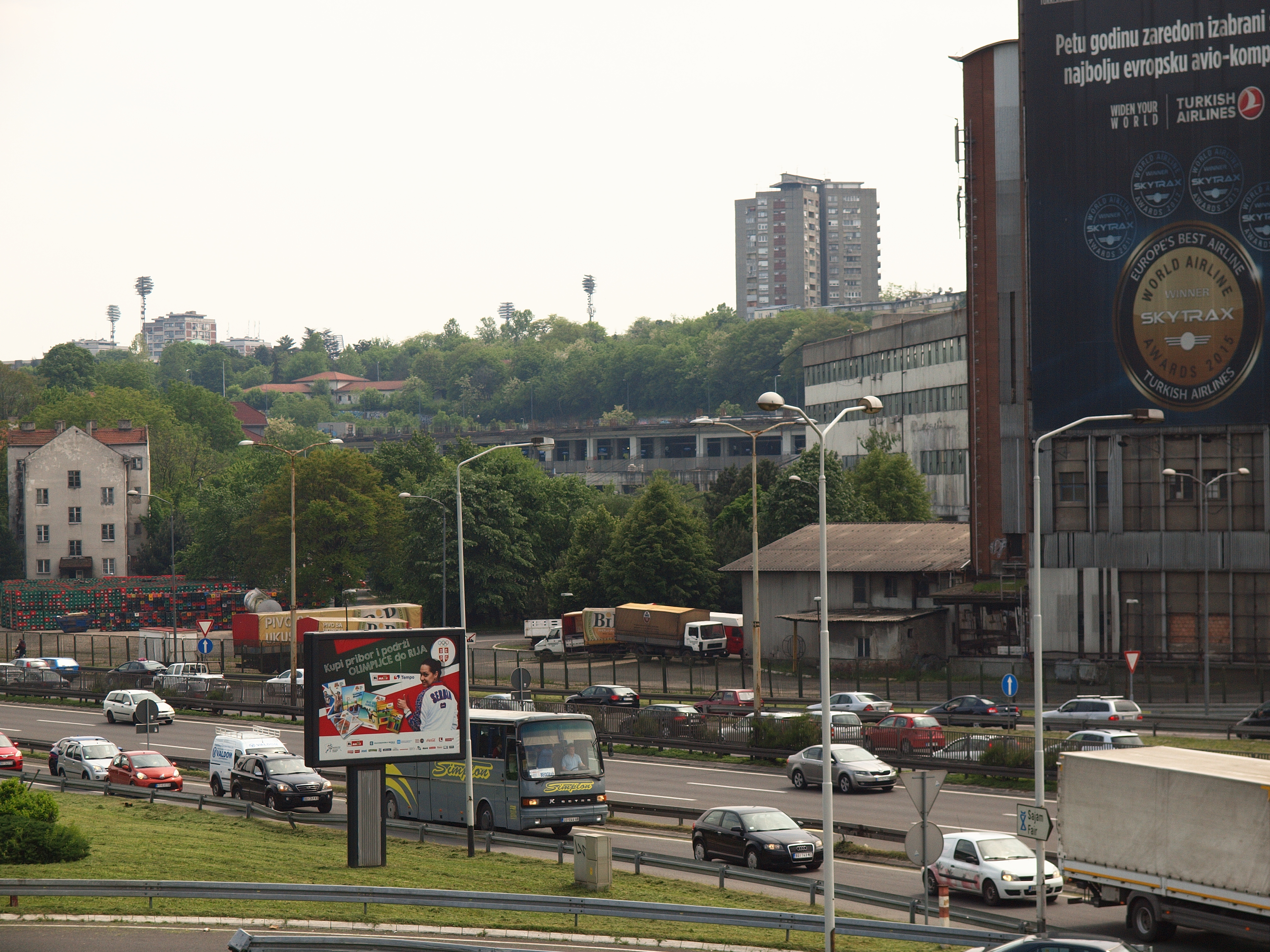
- Prokop, seen from the highway

- Location within Belgrade
- Coordinates: 44°47′37″N 20°27′14″E
- Country: Serbia
- Region: Belgrade
- Municipality: Savski Venac
- Time zone: UTC+1 (CET)
  - Summer (DST): UTC+2 (CEST)
- Area code: +381(0)11
- Car plates: BG

Prokop (Serbian Cyrillic: Прокоп) is an urban neighborhood of Belgrade, the capital of Serbia. It is located in Belgrade's municipality of Savski Venac. The major facility in the neighborhood is the new Belgrade Centre railway station, opened for limited use in 2016. Due to the name of the main street in the old section of the neighborhood, and the name of the local community (sub-municipal administrative unit) which includes Prokop, the neighborhood's name is occasionally reported as Stjepan Filipović.

== Location ==
Prokop is located at the southern edges of downtown Belgrade to which it is directly connected by the Kneza Miloša street. It borders the area of former Zapadni Vračar on the north, Mostar and Senjak on the west and Dedinje on the south. It is bounded by three boulevards: Franše D'Eperea (named after general D'Esperey and in fact a part of A1 highway), Vojvode Putnika and Kneza Aleksandra Karađorđevića (named after Prince Alexandre).

== History ==
Prokop is located in the eastern section of the former neighborhood of Jatagan Mala. Previously, it was a geographical reference, as the area was located in the lower valley of the now underground stream of Mokroluški Potok. The gully already existed, which by the late 19th century already marked the division between the urbanized city territory and unurbanized outskirts. The earth and gravel were dug here and used to cover and drain the swamps on the Sava's right bank, so that neighborhoods of Savamala and Bara Venecija could be constructed, and especially because of the construction of the Belgrade Main railway station in 1884. After the works were completed, the area around Mokroluški Potok was left as a steep, elongated cut in the ground and so got its name (Serbian prokop, cut or dug through). Ruling prince, later king Milan personally suggested this area, which stretched above the Đorđe Vajfert's brewery and the neighborhood of Smutekovac. He cited many reasons like the quality of the earth or closeness to the construction site which would reduce the transportation costs, as the money was indeed lacking. However, that land belonged to his wife, Princess Natalie, so the prince even earned money from the station's construction. In a historical twist, the Prokop is today location of the central railway station in Belgrade.

Digging of the material continued until 1898, when the filling of Bara Venecija was completely finished. During the digging of the materials, the former gully was expanded and became 0.5 km (0.31 mi) long, 100 m (330 ft) wide and 15 m (49 ft) deep. As the ground was fertile, the gully was first cultivated, mainly for corn and vegetables. After World War I, the settlement began to develop, just like the neighboring Jatagan Mala. First settlers were railroad workers and those who were employed in the neighboring factories, and had to leave their crumbly houses in the city, which were demolished in order to make way for the new, modern residential blocks. The main street was laid as the central thoroughfare at the bottom of the gully, while the side streets were parallel, almost as if the settlement was planned. This original section of Prokop had no hovels, but only proper houses and even junior clerks from city and state administration moved in.

Growing into the eastern extension of the already impoverished shanty town Jatagan Mala, some parts of Prokop grew even more destitute and were considered some of the poorest neighborhoods of Belgrade. Due to that, as well as the lack of any communal infrastructure or plans for the area, and a fact that geographically the settlement actually existed at the bottom of a big hole, during rains floods and mudslides were common, like in the winter of 1935. It was reported that at extremely snowy winters, due to the defile-like configuration, people would exit houses through chimneys as the bottom of the gully would be completely buried under the snow.

As a curiosity, the daily newspaper Politika from 8 March 2007 reprinted its own article from 1957 about Prokop. The article, titled "For how long will Prokop defy the construction of the city", colors Prokop as a black hole in the city center and describes the project of the reconstruction of the Franše d'Eperea street (modern highway) which would include an artificial lake with many restaurants, foreseeing that Prokop will be the most beautiful part of Belgrade. In another reprint, Politika published its article from 1 April 1965 about Prokop titled New settlement on Čukarica will be built for the inhabitants of Prokop. In it, Prokop is depicted as the largest informal settlement in Belgrade which basically has no roads, grocery stores and is regularly being flooded during rains. Demolition of Prokop was scheduled for 1965 but had to be postponed and instead of the settlement, whose inhabitants were to be resettled to the neighborhood of Čukarica, a large garage and depot for Belgrade’s public transit company GSP Belgrade was to be built. Both projects were scrapped later. After several attempts, the last remains of Jatagan Mala were fully demolished in 1961.

Oldest section of the neighborhood was a railway workers settlement, connected by the Stjepana Filipovića Street to the Rudo Institute. Known as the Railway Colony, it was located on the mass wasting slope so by the 1960s its resettling began. The entire Colony was destroyed in the extremely rainy autumn of 1969, when the slope totally collapsed. This caused permanent discontinuation of the street in two parts. In February 1969 another relocation was announced. The municipality of Savski Venac obtained 270 apartments in the neighborhoods of Žarkovo and Kanarevo Brdo, so the moving of the population by the spring brought the closing of the slum section of the neighborhood, which was, at the time, one of the oldest surviving such parts of the city.

In the 1970s, the mass wasting was temporarily fixed. In the late 1970s and early 1980s, the long, concrete retaining wall was built, to prevent future landslides. The wall is anchored to the bedrock with underground anchors, which are in some sections 60 metres (200 ft) long.

The population of the modern local community was 2,710 in 1981, 2,467 in 1991, 2,103 in 2002 and 1,786 in 2011.

== Railway station ==
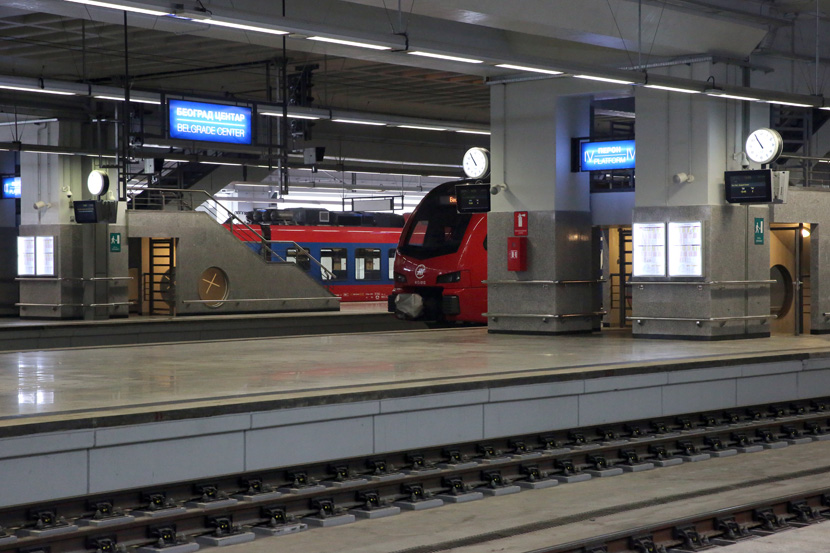
Belgrade Centre railway station

The ill-fated construction of the new railway station which was supposed to replace the old one in Savamala has lasted for decades. The official work began in 1977, it was halted in the 1980s, resumed in the 1990s and halted again in 2000. Originally, in the late 1960s, it was supposed to be constructed near the present interchange of Autokomanda, but the idea was suddenly dropped, and one of the major authorities at the time, Branko Žeželj, picked Prokop instead, which ultimately left the Autokomanda interchange unfinished. Despite constant attempts to build it and upgrade it, after years of starting and then halting works and bankrupted companies, Prokop railway station is still just one of a dozen secondary stations in Belgrade.

After the Avala Tower was destroyed in NATO bombing of Serbia 1999, certain Russian companies offered to build a new, higher (300 meters) TV tower in Prokop. No one took it seriously so the news was mostly used for publicity purposes.

The construction of the Belgrade Waterfront and track removal in Savamala restarted the construction of the station once again in December 2014. Energoprojekt AD was once again selected as the contracting company and was given nearly 26 million euros and 14 months to complete the construction. For the first time the deadline was kept and the station was officially opened on 26 January 2016.

In March 2021 city decided to build additional residential buildings in the neighborhood, in the section between the streets Stjepana Filipovića and Dragana Mancea, and the railway station itself. It is planned as the part of the wider railway station complex. The selected lot used to be a green area, until the temporary worker's quarters for the employees of "Energoprojekt" were placed in the 1990s, when the construction of the station was resumed. The quarters were largely abandoned after 2005, and the residents hoped to return the greenery, plant trees and build a children's playground. Tenants' associations of the buildings in the vicinity of the planned construction coordinated against the project, and city responded that "nothing is definite yet".

In October 2021, city announced plans to build 37,000 square metres (400,000 sq ft) of commercial and residential space on this location. The total area of 1.8 hectares (4.4 acres) will be filled with high-rise buildings up to 80 metres (260 ft) tall. The investor is the "Railway City Belgrade" company, which also builds the station. They planned to build two buildings, 11 and 23 storeys high. Local residents continually organized protests, announcing they will withhold all permits which the investor has to obtain from them. In December 2021, city announced it is backing off from construction of the buildings in this area, cause they "accepted citizens' complaints", and because the construction could "indeed trigger the mass wasting again". Existing structure on the lot will be adapted into the communal center in 2022.

In November 2022 it was announced that city awarded another lot, in New Belgrade's Block No. 40, to "Railway City Belgrade" as a compensation for not building additional skyscrapers in Prokop. Though the area of the lot is smaller, 1.06 ha (2.6 acres) compared to 1.8 ha (4.4 acres), the total floor area of two planned buildings (one residential, one commercial), remained roughly the same at 38,000 m^{2} (410,000 sq ft). The company was conditioned to finish the station in Prokop first, before it can build anything in New Belgrade.
