= Niš railway station =

Railway station in Serbia

Niš Ниш
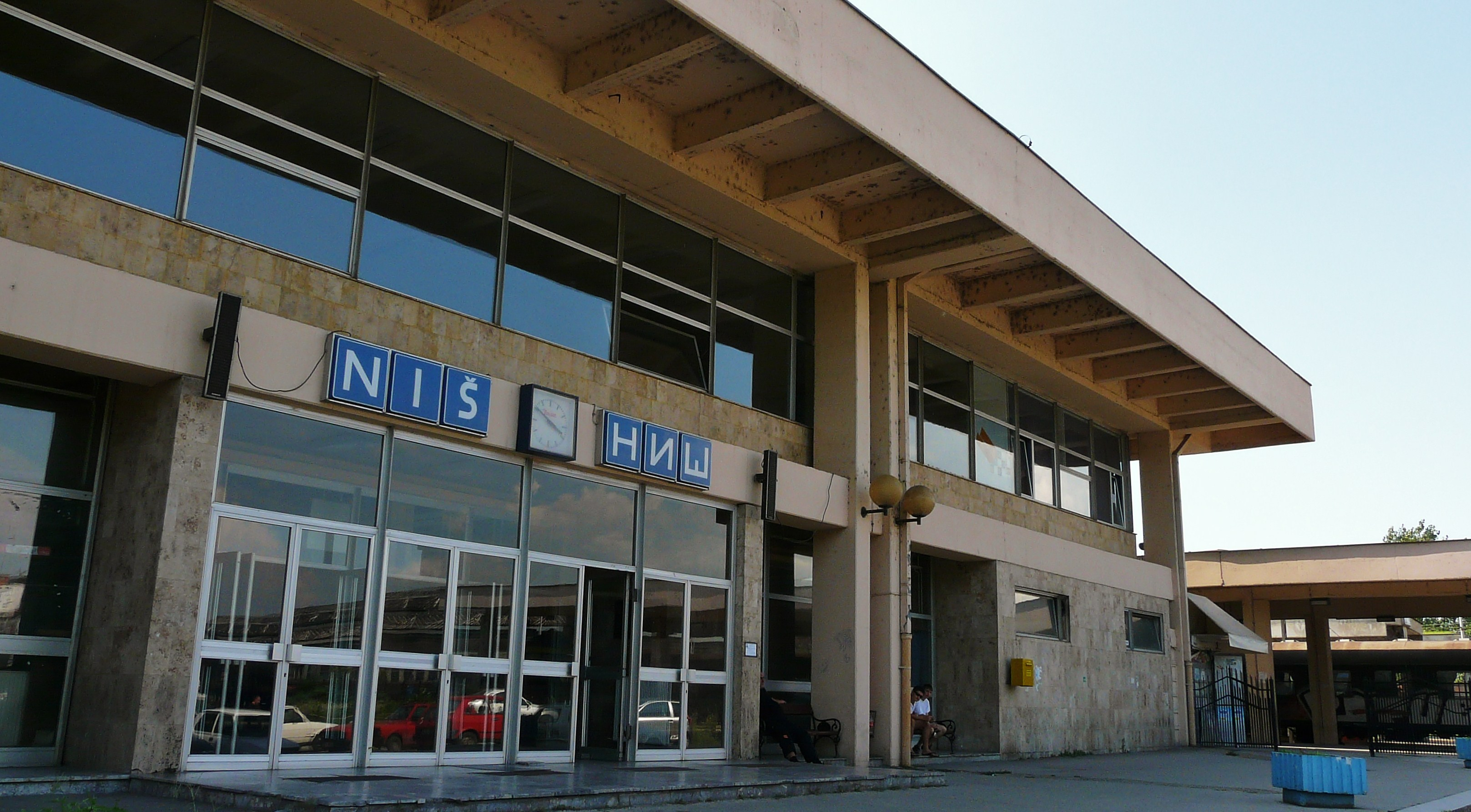
- Niš railway station

General information
- Location: Dimitrije Tucovića Niš; Serbia
- Coordinates: 43°19′0″N 21°52′37″E
- Owner: Serbian Railways Infrastructure
- Lines: Belgrade–Serbian border Niš–Dimitrovgrad; Niš–Prahovo
- Platforms: 3 (5)

History
- Opened: 1884
- Rebuilt: after World War II
Location

Niš railway station (Serbian: Железничка станица Ниш/Železnička stanica Niš) is a railway station in city of Niš in Nišava District in southern part of Serbia.

Station was opened in 1884. There are several railway lines running from this station; Belgrade-Niš, Niš-Dimitrovgrad, Niš-Skopje and Niš-Prahovo. The train station is located on the western outskirts of the city, on the street Dimitrije Tucovića.

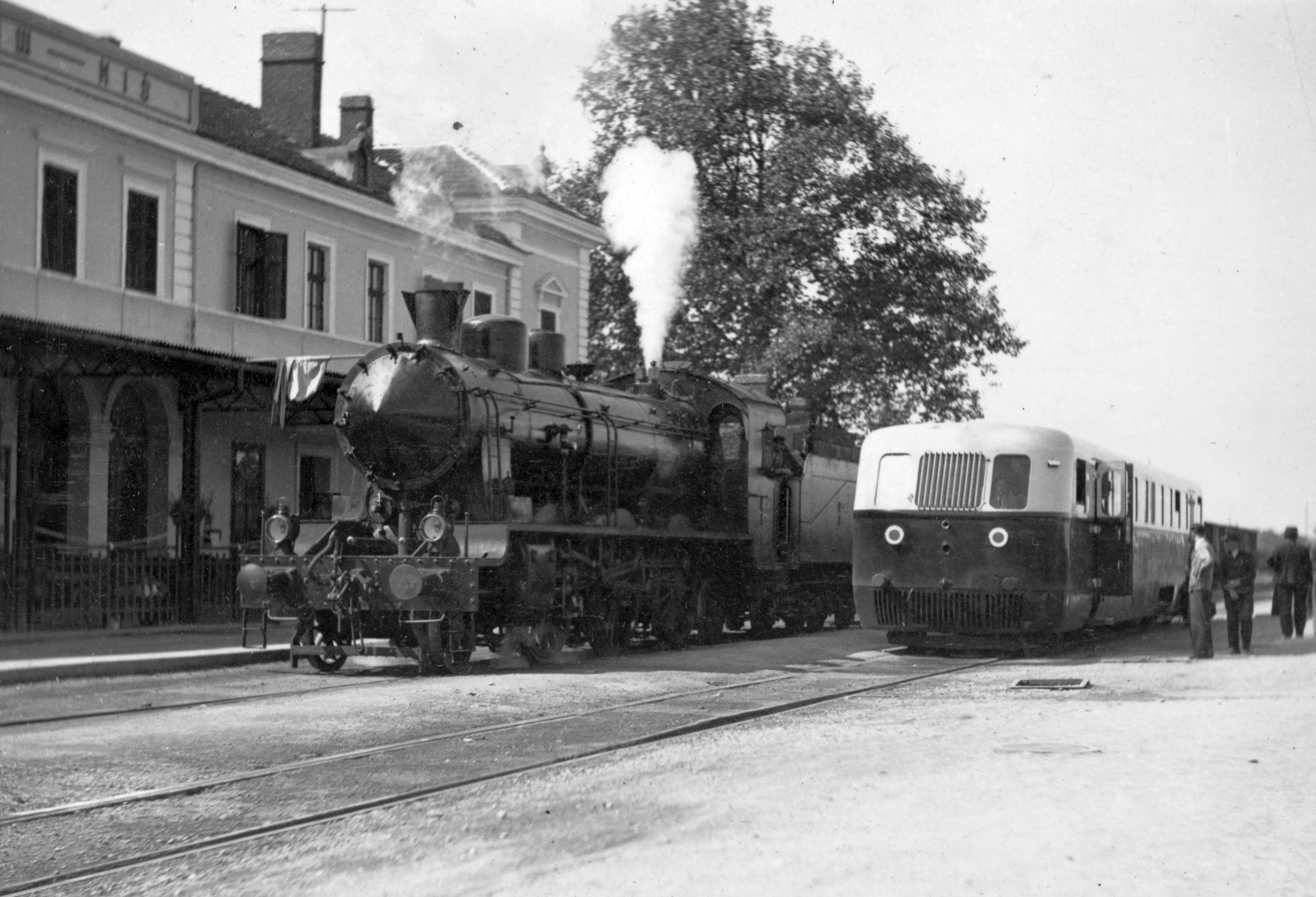
Steam locomotive JDŽ 01 in Niš railway station, 1937

The original building of the station served until World War II. In 1943, as a strategic object, the Anglo-American air raid was directed against the Nazi occupation of Serbia. The original building was heavily damaged and had to be pulled down after the war. After World War II, a new brutalist check-in hall was built.
