= Ovča railway station =

Railway station in Serbia

Ovča Овча
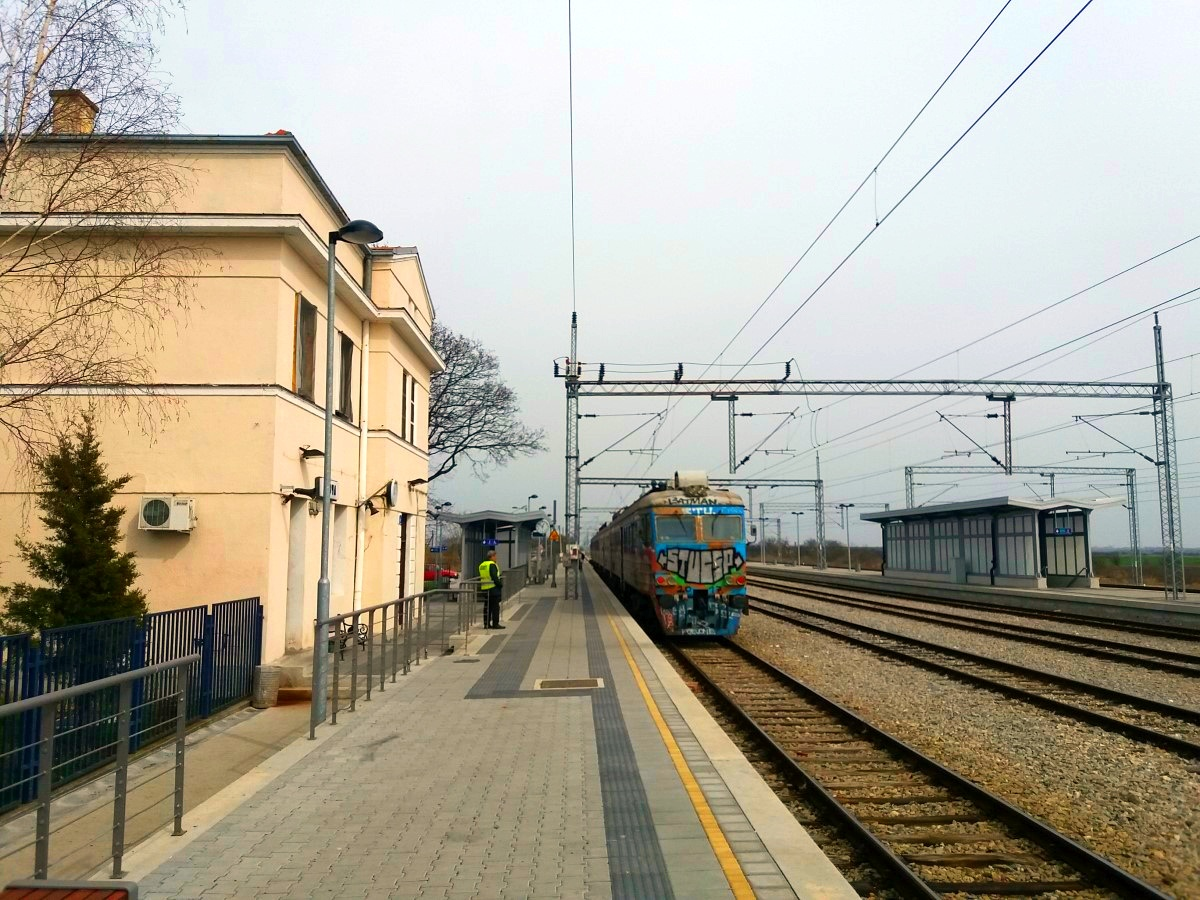
- Platform view with a BG Voz train on track 1

General information
- Location: Lole Ribara bb, Ovča; Serbia
- Coordinates: 44.876°N 20.545°E
- Owner: Serbian Railways
- Platforms: 2 side platforms
- Tracks: 7
- Connections: 105, 105L

Construction
- Structure type: At grade
- Parking: Yes
- Cycle facilities: Bicycle stand
Route map
Location

Ovča railway station (Serbian: Железничка станица Овча; Železnička stanica Ovča) is a railway station serving the village of Ovča in Palilula municipality of Belgrade, Serbia. The station is located outside of the village, about 1.2 km away to the southeast.

Updated in 2016, the station has two side platforms with seven tracks. It is the terminus of BG Voz, and also of local lines to Pančevo Glavna and to Pančevački Most. Outside the station is the terminus for Belgrade public transit bus lines 105 and 105L.
