= Zemun railway station =

Railway station in Belgrade, Serbia

Zemun Земун
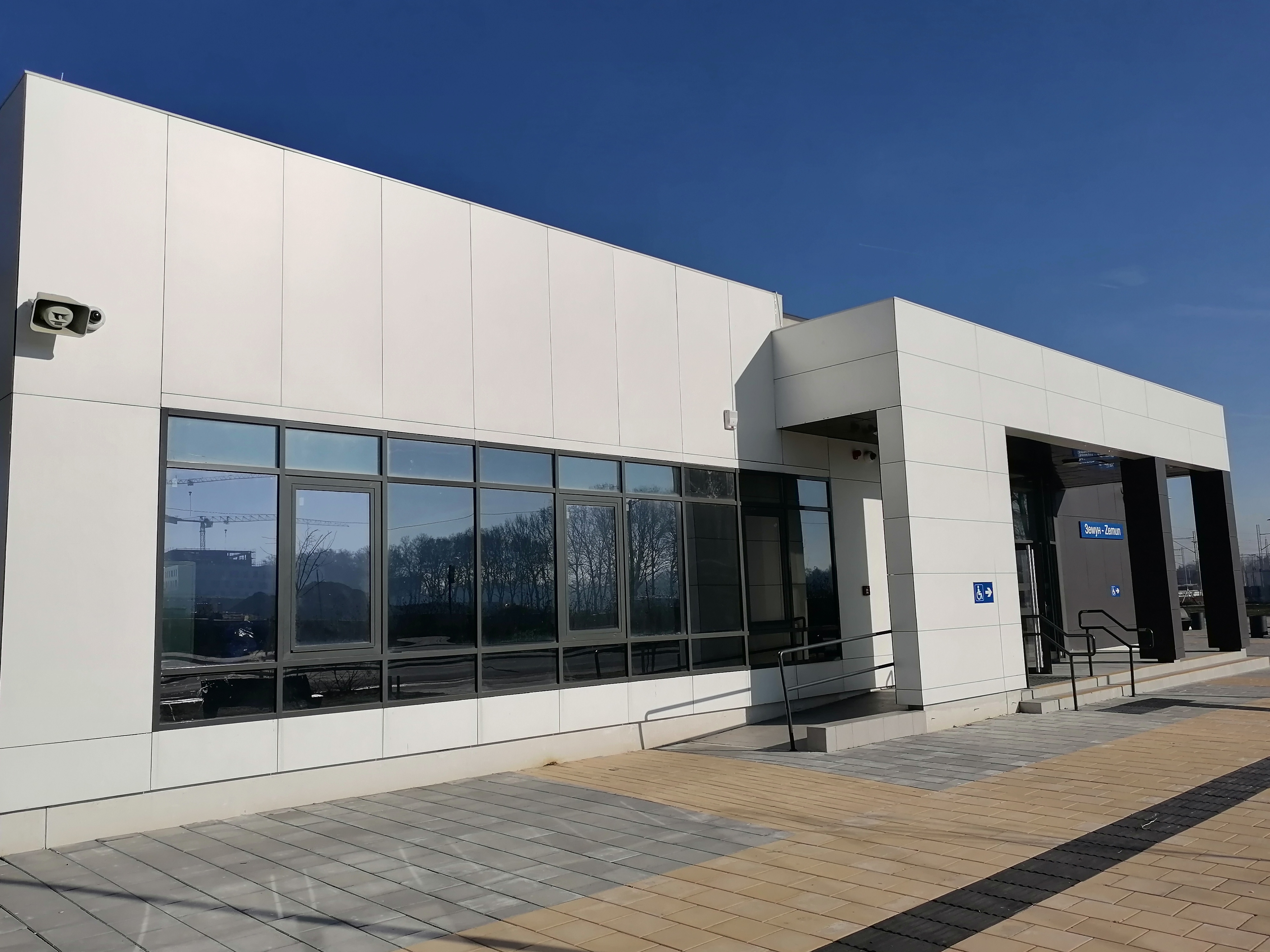
- Station building

General information
- Location: Zemun; Serbia
- Coordinates: 44°50′11″N 20°22′16″E
- Platforms: Island
- Tracks: 9
- Connections: Bus 709

Construction
- Structure type: At-grade
- Parking: Free parking lot
- Cycle facilities: Outdoor racks
- Accessible: No wheelchair access; Braille info on stair railings

History
- Opened: 1981
- Rebuilt: 2022

Services
Preceding station	BG Voz	Following station
Altina towards Batajnica	Line 1	Tošin Bunar towards Ovča
Preceding station	Srbijavoz	Following station
Tošin Bunar towards Belgrade Centre	Re (Regio)	Zemunsko Polje towards Novi Sad
Tošin Bunar towards Belgrade Centre	Re (Regio)	Zemunsko Polje towards Sremska Mitrovica
Tošin Bunar towards Belgrade Centre	Re (Regio)	Zemunsko Polje towards Šid
Terminus	Re (Regio)	Zemunsko Polje towards Niš
Terminus	Re (Regio)	Belgrade Centre towards Pancevo Varoš
Terminus	Re (Regio)	Tošin Bunar towards Vršac
Terminus	Re (Regio)	Tošin Bunar towards Valjevo
Terminus	Re (Regio)	Tošin Bunar towards Prijepolje Teretna
Terminus	Brzi (Fast train)	Tošin Bunar towards Bar, Montenegro
Track layout
Location

Zemun railway station (Serbian: Железничка станица Земун, Železnička stanica Zemun) is a rail station in the neighborhood and municipality of Zemun in Belgrade, the capital of Serbia. It is served by BG Voz and by Regio class trains. The railroad continues to Zemun Polje in one direction, and Tošin Bunar in the other direction. Zemun railway station spans 9 railway tracks.

After the station was selected as Belgrade's main freight station within the Belgrade railway junction, a massive expansion and reconstruction of the complex began in 2019.

== Old station ==
The original Zemun railway station was located next to where the modern Hotel Jugoslavija is. It was built in 1883 during the rule of Austria-Hungary, when the railway, which connected Zemun to Novi Sad, was finished. The first train from the station departed on 10 December 1883. In 1884 the railway was extended across the Sava into the Kingdom of Serbia as the first railway in the country. The very first train from Serbia, with the passengers including King Milan, Queen Natalija and Crown Prince Alexander, stopped at this station on its way to Vienna in 1884. Via the Old Railway Bridge, the Zemun station was connected to the Belgrade Main railway station.

Due to its location at the proximity of the border, the station also served as the customs house, colloquially called "Old Austrian Custom". The station complex also included classification yard. Later, when Zemun and Belgrade became part of the same state, and then joined into one city, Zemun's station became the classification yard for the entire Belgrade railway junction, as it was conceived at that time - Belgrade Main railway station-Zemun railway station-Beograd Dunav station. This has done as after World War I Belgrade's main station became overloaded. The Zemun station, however, also had no capacity to serve properly as the classification yard for much enlarged number of trains.

During World War II occupation, the classification yard was massively enlarged. In this period, new tracks were built to connect the station with Bežanija airport, and to Zemun port. After the war, the station was constantly overloaded with the expanding traffic. In 1960, the yard received 19,029 freight trains with 964,996 cars. As the yard had only 17 kilometres (11 mi) of tracks, or 60% of needed number, the cars were spending in the station 8 to 10 hours.

In 1967, it was decided to relocate the tracks, so the railway Zemun Novi Grad-New Belgrade-Sava bridge was projected. It included tunnel through Bežanijska Kosa. Also, a massive classification yard in Makiš was built, and took over as the main such facility in Belgrade. With these projects finished, and the first train passing via the new route in 1970, a demolition of the former station and dismantling of the tracks began that same year. The boiler room was already demolished a bit earlier. The station's building, "pride of Zemun", was demolished and replaced with new urban blocks along the modern municipal border between Zemun and New Belgrade. Demolition of the building itself, and the surrounding warehouses lasted for several years.

To commemorate the old station, architect Milun Stambolić designed a memorial complex which consists of 5 pillars and several meters of railroad tracks. The pillars used to hold the station's overhang on the platform side of the building. The complex is placed on the plateau next to Hotel Jugoslavija, on the small elevation above the promenade along the Danube. The memorial was dedicated on 22 October 1984.

== New station ==
Construction of the new station began in 1977. It became operational in 1981, but was never fully finished. In 1982 the double-track railway Zemun-Zemun Polje was finished. This was just a fraction of the project envisioned at the time for the new station.

=== Railway reconstruction ===
In 2016 a contract was signed in Riga, Latvia, with Chinese companies China Communications Construction Company and China Railways International for the modernization of the Belgrade-Stara Pazova section. The section is 34.5 km (21.4 mi) long and the works envisioned leveling of all crossings, uniforming of platforms, renovation of all stations along the route, underground passages, formation of the green areas, etc. Stations planned for reconstruction or adaptation included New Belgrade, Tošin Bunar (which should be relocated a bit), Zemun, Zemun Polje, Batajnica, Nova Pazova and Stara Pazova, while stations at Altina and Kamendin, also in the Zemun territory, will be built. It was announced that the railway will be finished by 2018.

The reconstruction had three phases: Prokop-Zemun, Zemun-Batajnica and Batajnica-Stara Pazova. Phase I and III was done first. The freight and passenger tracks were separated in the Batajnica-Stara Pazova section. Works started in November 2017 and the entire project was to be finished in 36 months, by November 2020. When everything is said and done, the train speed in the Belgrade-Batajnica section will be 120 km/h (75 mph) and in Batajnica-Stara Pazova section up to 200 km/h (120 mph).

After numerous delays, and four and a half years of discontinuation of railway traffic between Belgrade and Novi Sad, the railway was reopened on 19 March 2022.

=== 2010s diffusion of traffic ===
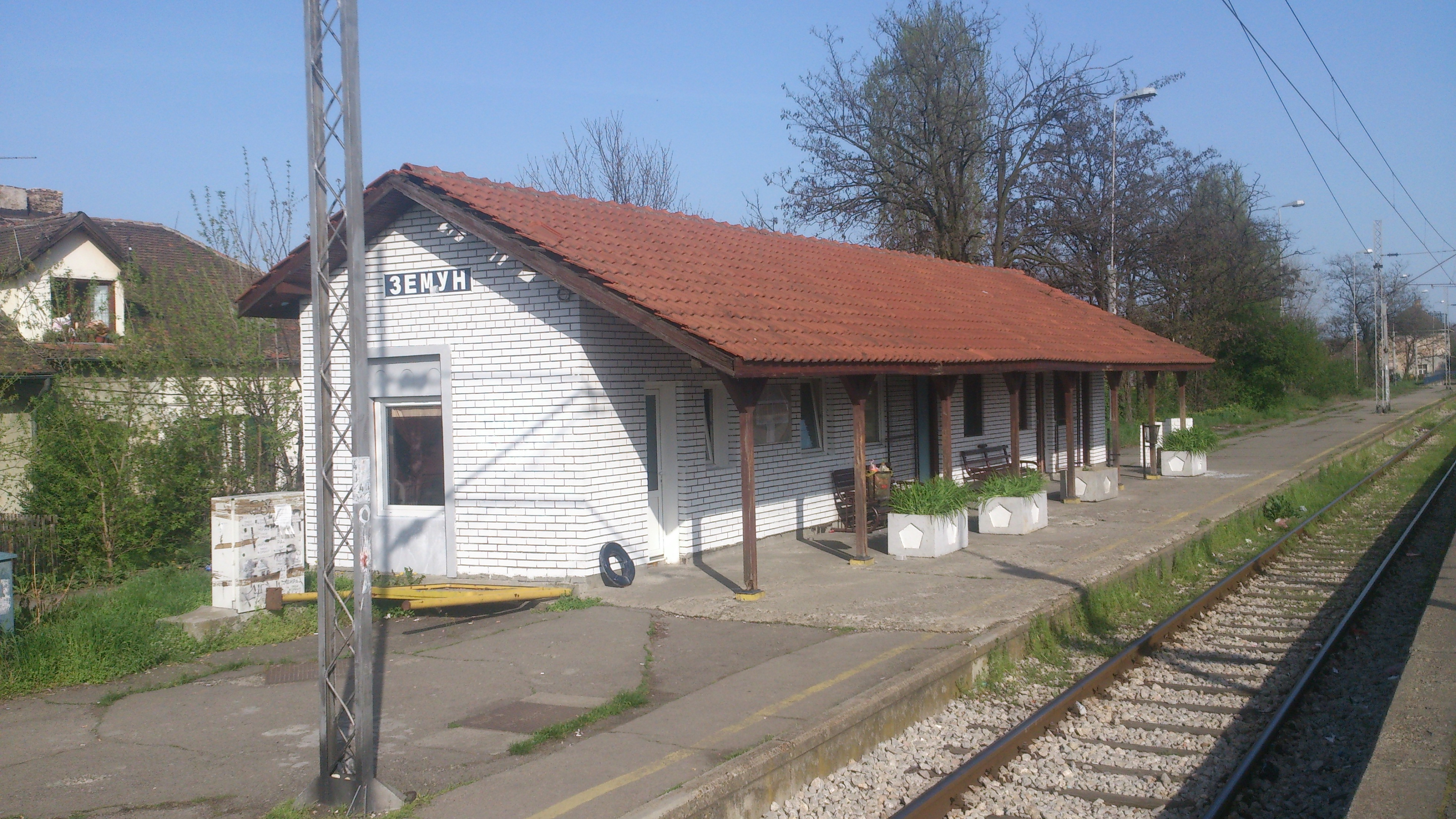
Building which served as the station building from 1981 to 2019

By 2018, the system of Belgrade Railway Junction was envisioned to be centered around the Prokop (passenger traffic), Zemun (freight traffic) and Makiš (Belgrade marshalling yard) stations. Gradual moving of trains from the Belgrade Main railway station to Prokop station began in the early 2016. In December 2017, all but two national trains were dislocated to "Belgrade Center".

Problems arose immediately. The Prokop was still unfinished, had no station building nor a proper access road and public transportation connections with the rest of the city. Additionally, it had no facilities for loading and unloading cars from the auto trains nor was ever planned to have one. Still, in January 2018 it was announced that the old station will be completely closed for traffic on 1 July 2018, even though none of the projects needed for a complete removal of the railway traffic were finished. The Prokop was incomplete, a projected main freight station in Zemun was not adapted at all (including car loading platform), while there was even no project for the Belgrade railway beltway.

A series of temporary solutions was applied. A defunct and deteriorated Topčider railway station was partially revitalized and adapted for auto trains. Its major flaw was a bad public transportation connection (only one tram line, No. 3), so the railway company asked officially for this problem to be solved. It was announced that the official deadline for the construction of the station building in Prokop is 2 years, however there are no funds for it. A second part of the Kuwaiti loan (€50 million) is still not approved and the needed public procurements will be finished by the end of 2018.

Freight station in Zemun will be located between the existing stations Zemun and Zemun Polje, on the area of 35 ha (86 acres). Revitalization of the existing 6 km (3.7 mi) of tracks and 14,500 m^{2} (156,000 sq ft) of buildings will be followed by the construction of the 17 km (11 mi) of new tracks and additional 18,800 m^{2} (202,000 sq ft) of edifices. Deadline was also 2 years, but the works should start only at the end of 2018. That way the planned Belgrade railway junction won't be finished before 2021, at best. However, minister for transportation, Zorana Mihajlović, in December 2017 gave conflicting deadlines. She said that the station building in Prokop will be built from April 2018 to April 2019 and that freight station Zemun should be finished by the end of 2018.

=== Expansion ===
The works on the Zemun railway station complex began on 9 September 2019, and the deadline was set for 11 November 2021. The finished station should spread on 17 tracks, with varying lengths (73 to 638 metres (240 to 2,093 ft)), and on five, 400 metres (1,300 ft) long platforms. They will be connected with the central pedestrian underpass, and two additional freight and luggage underpasses. The new station building is also being built.

In October 2018 a deadline for finishing the Zemun station was extended to early 2022. The works were quite slow for the first few years, but then were accelerated, especially in 2022. In late March 2022, the station was re-opened as part of the opening of the reconstructed Belgrade–Novi Sad railway. The new station building was built on the opposite side of the tracks, however the platform and track numbering starts from the side of the old building. Four island platforms serve eight out of nine tracks, while the central track (number 5) runs through. Platform are accessed through an underground passageway.

In June 2022, deadline for completion of the entire complex was moved to 30 September 2022. The works continued to drag on, so the Chinese investor replaced the sub-contractors. The station was equipped with elevators in March 2023.

== Gallery ==
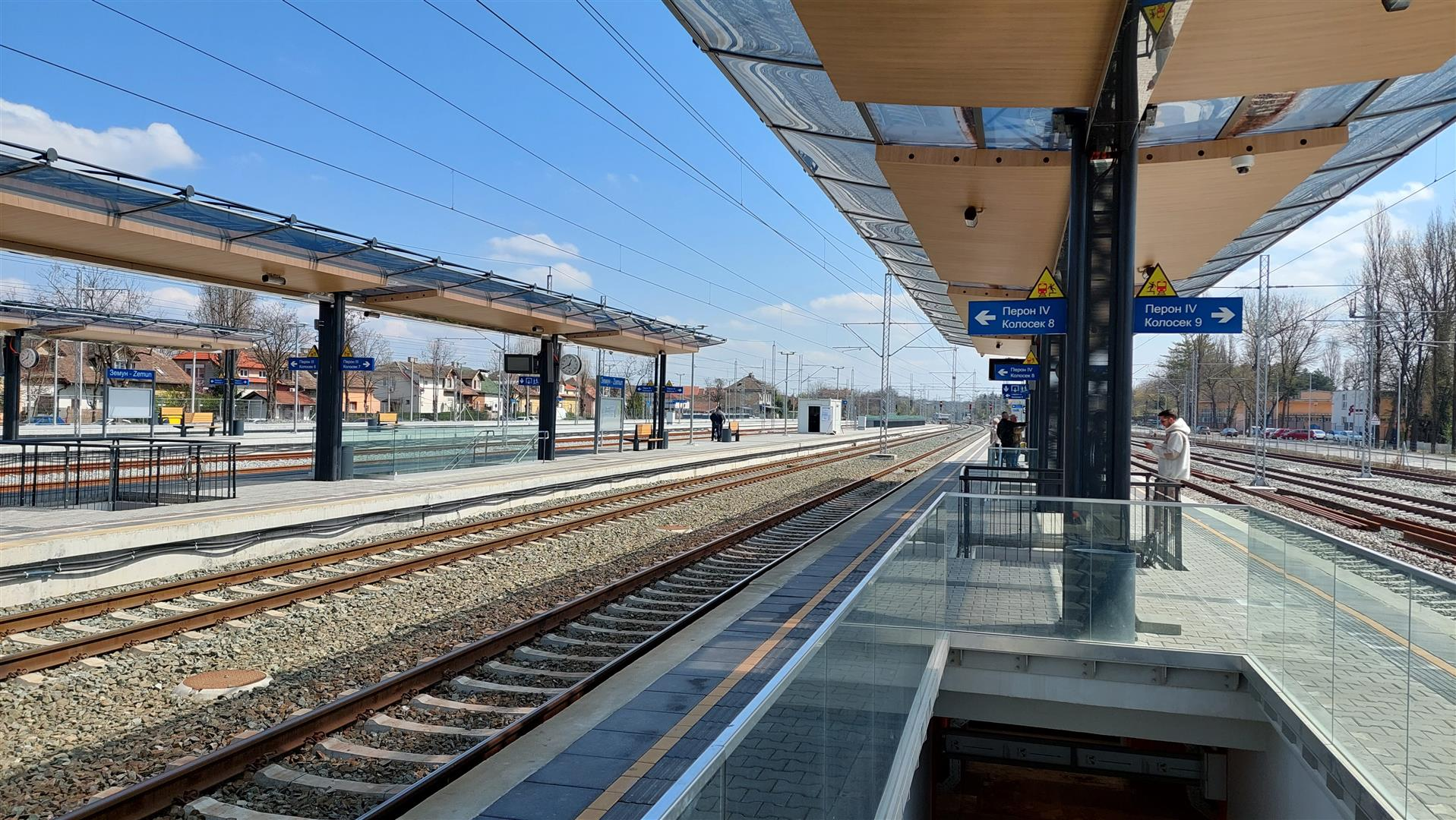
View from platform IV

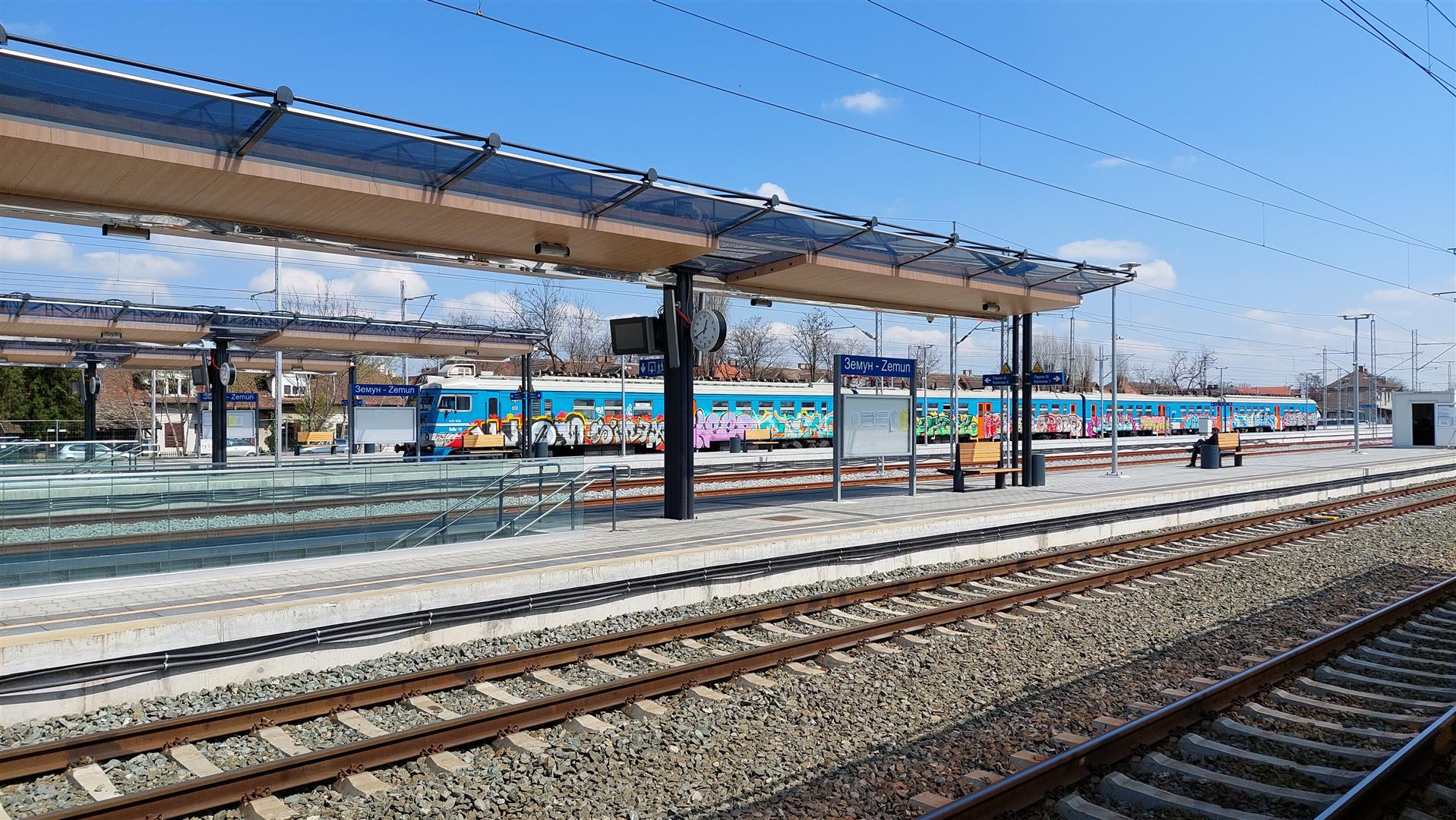
A BG Voz train entering the station

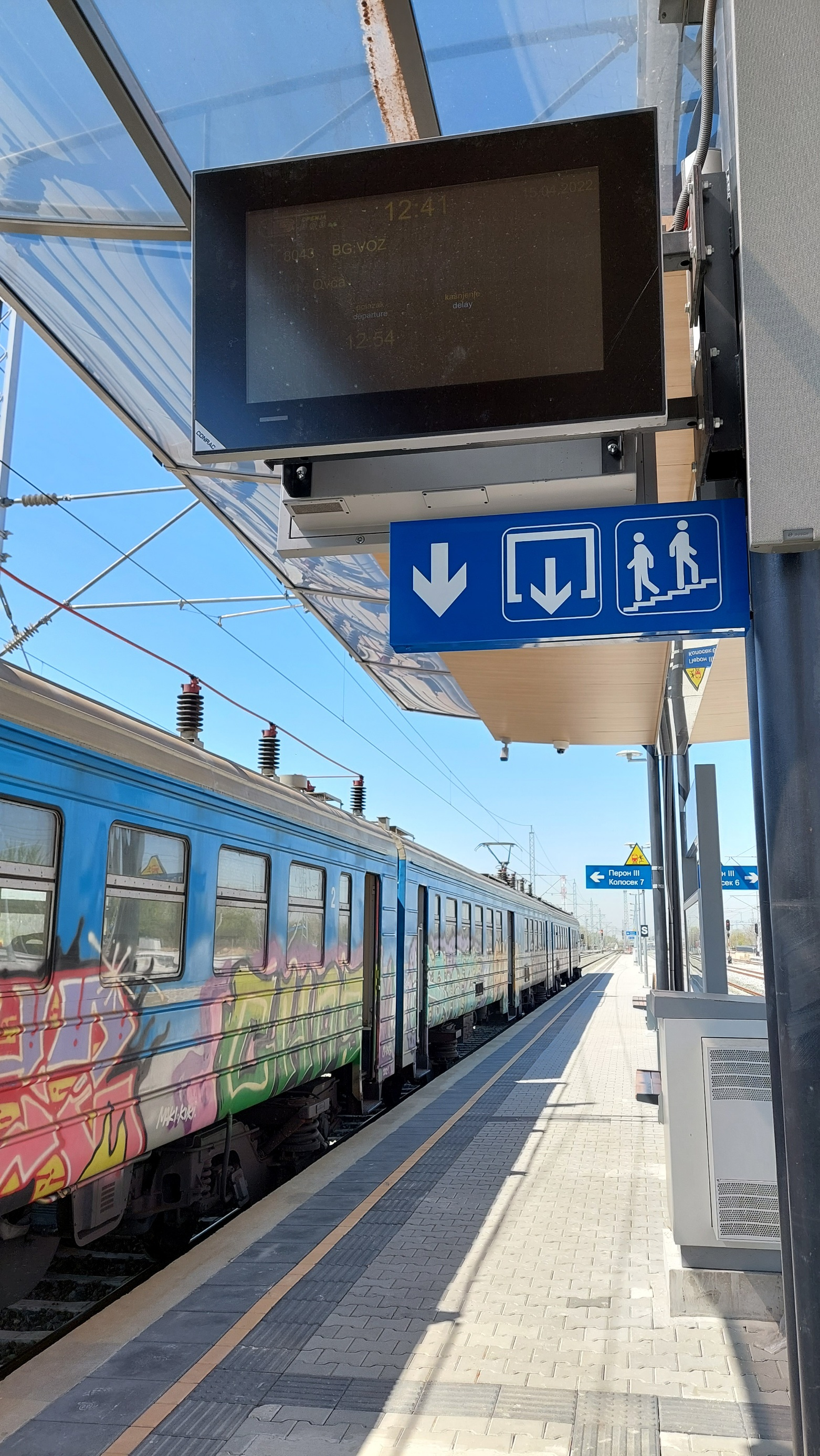
BG Voz train 8043 awaiting departure from track 7

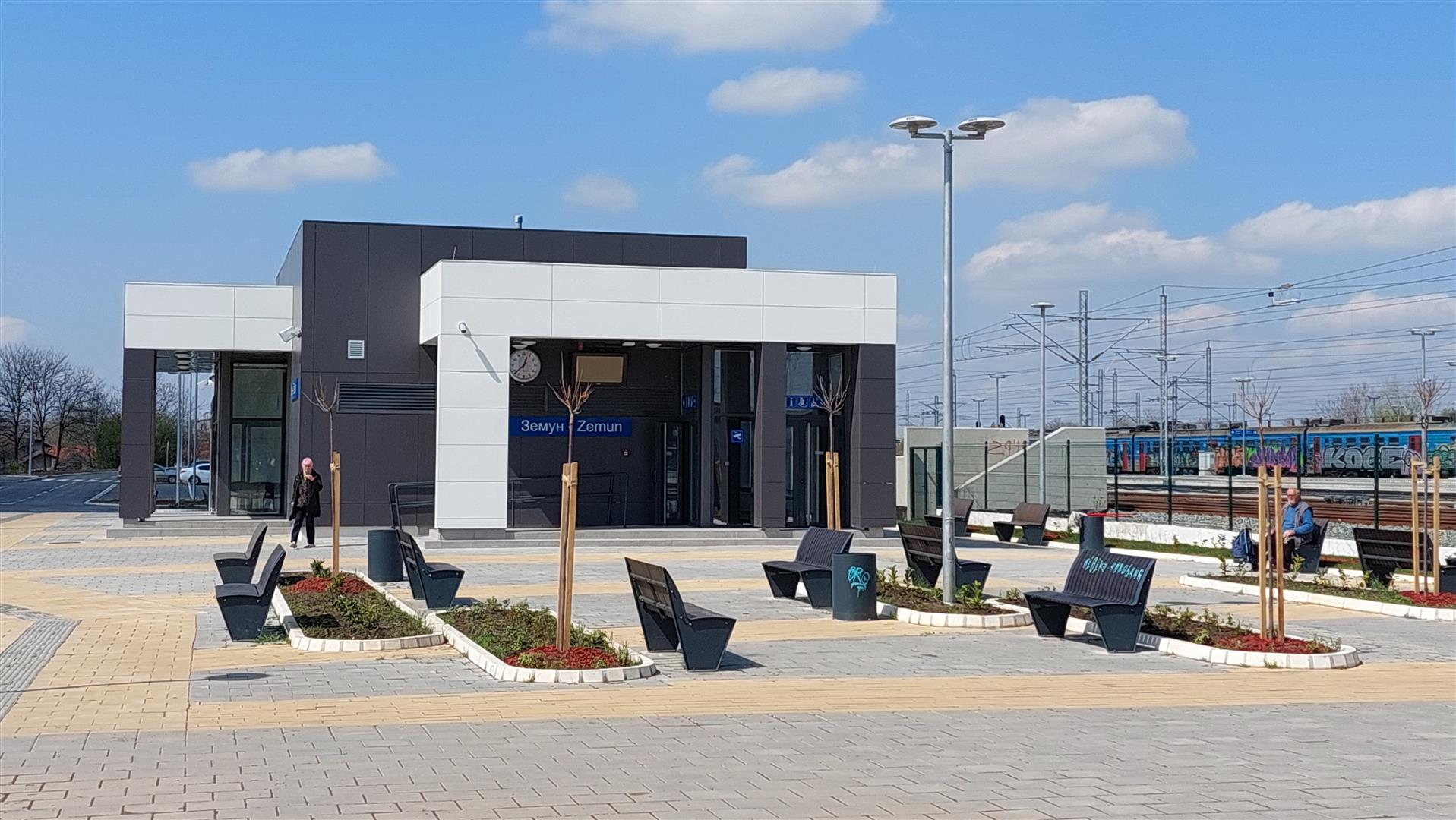
Station building with concourse

== See also ==
- Srbija voz
- Beovoz
- BG Voz
