= Belgrade railway junction =

The Belgrade railway junction (Serbian: Београдски железнички чвор, Beogradski železnički čvor) is a large-scale reconstruction of the rail network in Belgrade, Serbia. It was launched 1971 with works officially starting 1974 with the construction of the New Railway Bridge. The central part of the scheme is formed by the Belgrade Centre railway station, better known as Prokop after the neighborhood it is located in, which is served via three tunnels beneath the city center.

Construction of the Belgrade railway junction was mostly completed with the opening of the Vukov spomenik underground passenger station in 1995. As the completion of the Prokop railway station was severely delayed due to lack in funding the network, which was planned to replace the old rail network and the historical central station up till today is only used for the BG Voz S-train of the urban modal city network.

During World War II, German occupational administration developed a project of Belgrade railway junction, which never materialized. Very detailed and specific plans are kept in the Belgrade Railway Museum.

== Concept ==
The main feature of the railway scheme is that all railway installations cross the town center underground and do not collide with the urban infrastructure. Three tunnels adding 14 km (8.7 mi) in length have been constructed. They connect the central railway station at Prokop with the main rail links to the west, north and south of the city.

The Belgrade railway junction is an intermodal project for long distance, suburban and city traffic, including a shunting station with attached tracks a descending ramp, shunting and loading-unloading group of tracks, a locomotive depot, as well as a major passenger station - Belgrade Centre - and technical passenger stations. The suburban traffic within the complex runs in three directions with an underground station at Vukov Spomenik in downtown Belgrade.

Within the scheme the Belgrade railway junction is serving seven main international rail routes with a considerable capacity. Part of the junction are 15 passenger stations, a new marshalling yard serving the international transport Makiš with centralized and automatic management and traffic control and a daily capacity of 600 railway cars. Within the Prokop central station plans to build 120,000 m^{2} (1,300,000 sq ft) of business space exist.

By 2018, the system is envisioned to be centered around the Prokop (passenger traffic), Zemun (freight traffic) and Makiš (marshaling yard) stations.

== Construction history ==
=== 1970s-2000s ===
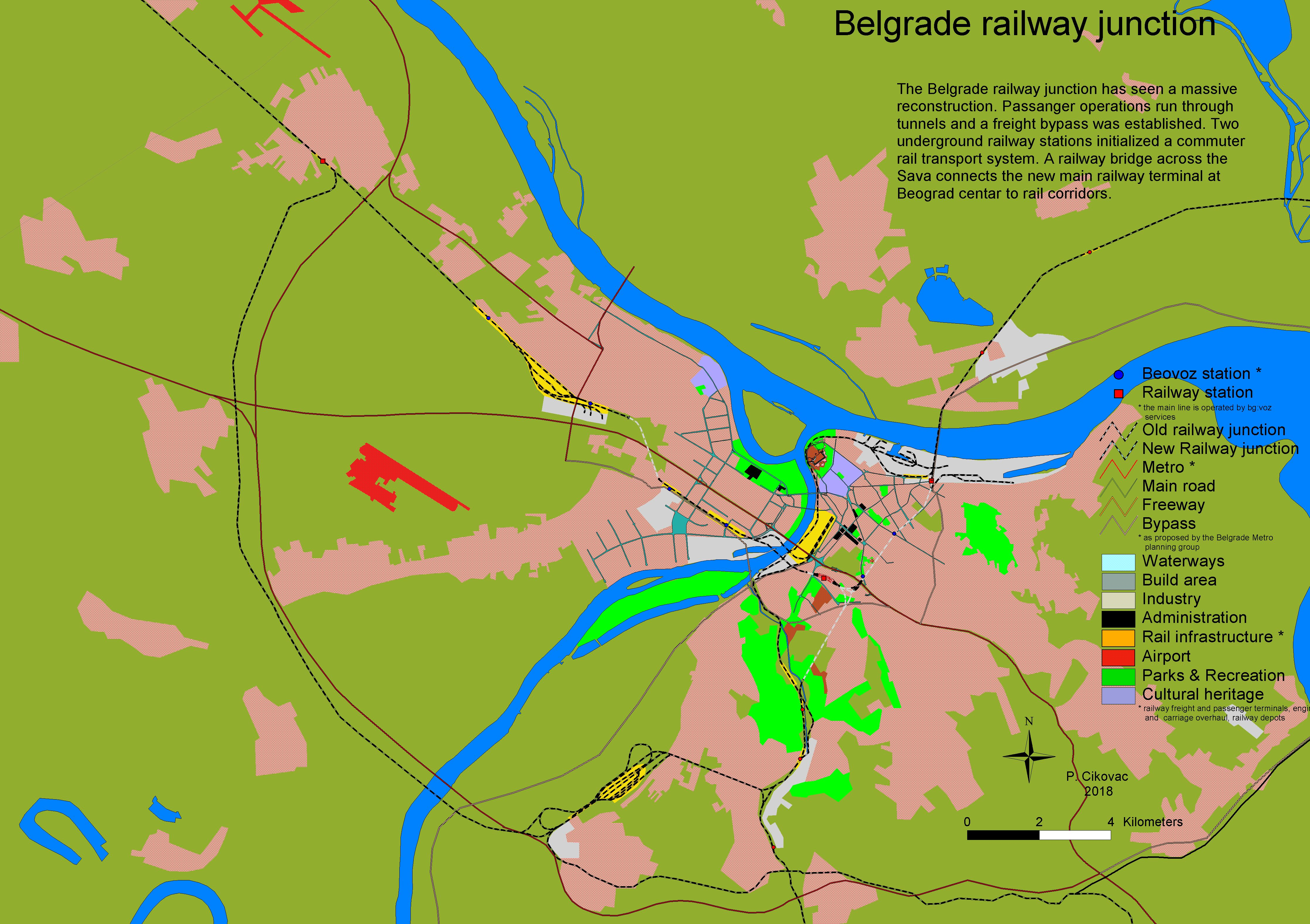
Railway junction and Public transportation in Belgrade. Parts of the bypass, railway junction and bridges across Save and Danube are under construction or part of the general urban planning. The proposed Metro lines are based on the final Metro plan from 1982 from the Belgrade Metro planning group.

Works began in 1974 by building the bridge across the river Sava and the tunnels "Vračar" and "Dedinje". The bridge, New Railway Bridge, was finished in 1979, while the tunnels were finished in 1993 and 1988, respectively.

The Zemun railway station was built from 1977 to 1981 when was opened, even though it was never fully finished. In the early 1980s, the marshaling yard in Makiš was arranged. In 1982 the double-track railway Zemun-Zemun Polje was finished and part of the passenger-technical Zemun railway station was built. In 1984 double-track railway New Belgrade-Belgrade Centre, across the New Railway Bridge was finished, so as the "Senjak" tunnel, the continuation of the bridge, which connects it with the Prokop station. In 1988 the two single-track railway tubes ("Dedinje" tunnel) were finished, establishing the connection Belgrade Centre-Rakovica-Jajinci. The tunnel is 3 km (1.9 mi). There were significant problems during the digging under the Humska Street (Partizan Stadium) and the royal palace of Beli Dvor.

Double-track railway Belgrade Centre-Pančevo Bridge, with tunnels "Vračar" and "Stadion", was finished in 1993. The "Vračar" tunnel is 3.5 km (2.2 mi) long. From the Pančevo Bridge an additional double-track tunnel, "Karaburma", 600 m (2,000 ft) long, was also built but it was never in use. That same year, the double-track connecting switch railway "Karađorđev Park" and switch "Dedinje", with railway stations Karađorđev Park and Pančevo Bridge, were also completed. On 7 July 1995, the underground station Vukov Spomenik was opened. As of 2018, most of the stations lack the station buildings or access roads.

Other larger facilities built include:

- tunnels: "Bežanijska Kosa", "Karaburma", "Kneževac", "Kijevo 1", "Kijevo 2" and "Kijevo 3";
- stations: Tošin Bunar railway station;
- bridges and overpasses: Bridge on the circular road in Rakovica, overpass across the Novi Sad highway and three-forked overpass across the highway at Maleško Brdo-Autokomanda;

In the complex on the part of passenger and goods transport system, by 2018 the following was built in total:

- 15 single-track tunnels (19,744 m (64,777 ft)), three tunnels for two tracks (4,431 m (14,537 ft)), and one multi-track tunnel 200 m (660 ft) long;
- 36 reinforced concrete prestressed railway bridges of the total length 4,960 m (16,270 ft) and road area of 65,255 m^{2} (702,400 sq ft) and seven carriageway brides 957 m (3,140 ft) long and road area of 9,840 m^{2} (105,900 sq ft);
- 12 steel single-track bridges of the total length 1,266 m (4,154 ft) and six bridges for two tracks of total length 2,034 m (6,673 ft).

Estimated funds for the completion of the junction are 250 million US$, which should be provided from foreign investment and loans. Final date of completion was set for 2010, but nothing has been done by that deadline.

=== 2010s ===
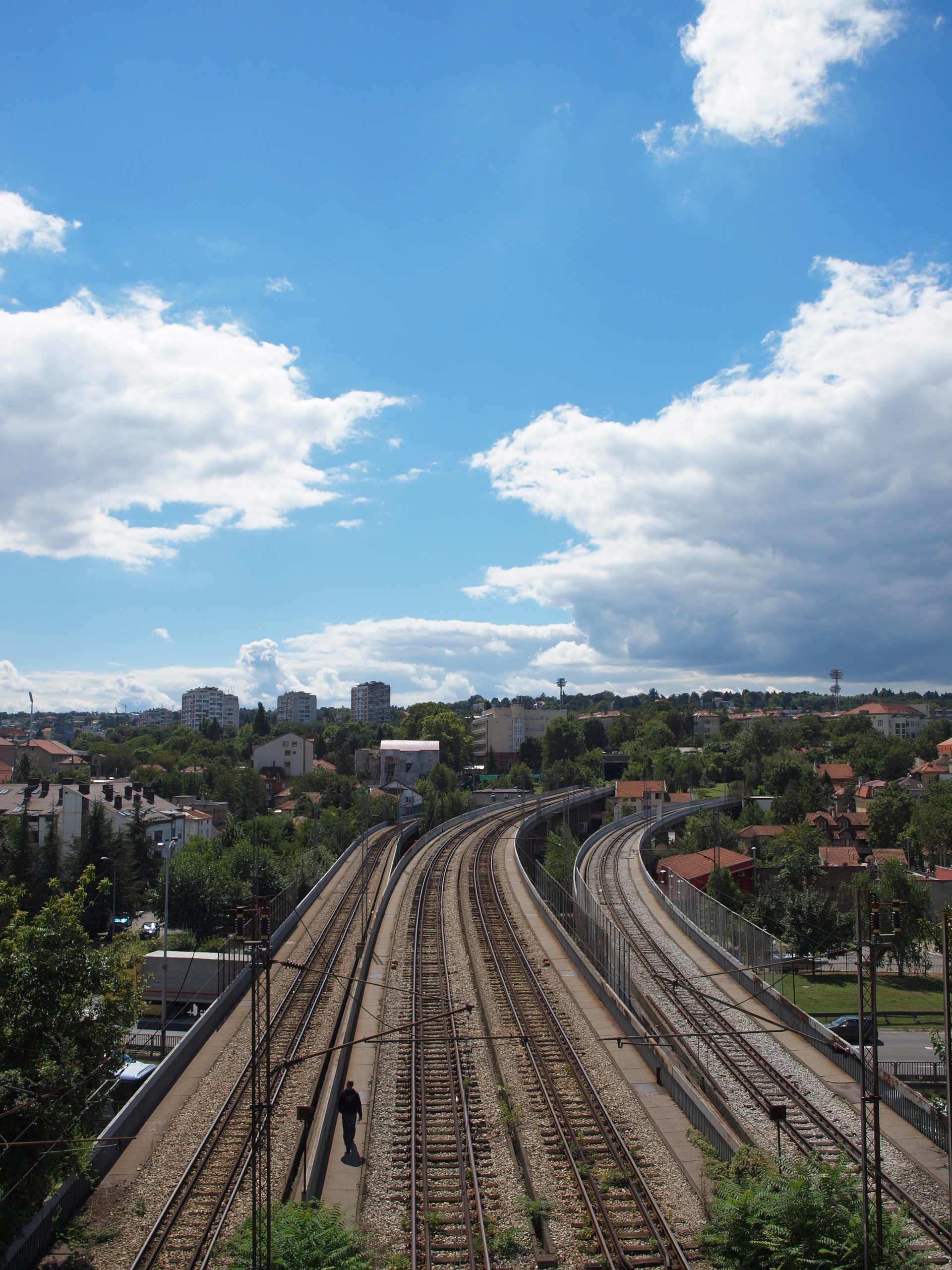
Track network of the railway junction

Gradual moving of trains from the Main station to the new, Prokop station began in the early 2016. In December 2017, all but two national trains were dislocated to "Belgrade Center". Problems arose immediately. The Prokop is still not finished, has no station building and a proper access road and public transportation connections with the rest of the city. Additionally, it has no facilities for loading and unloading cars from the auto trains nor was ever planned to have one. Still, in January 2018 it was announced that the station will be completely closed for traffic on 1 July 2018, even though none of the projects needed for a complete removal of the railway traffic are finished. The Prokop is incomplete, a projected main freight station in Zemun is not being adapted at all while there is even no project on a Belgrade railway beltway.

A series of temporary solutions will have to be applied. One is the defunct and deteriorated Topčider station, which will be revitalized and adapted for auto trains. It has one major flaw, a bad public transportation connection (only one tram line, No. 3), so the railway company asked officially for this problem to be solved. It was announced that the official deadline for the construction of the station building in Prokop is 2 years, however there are no funds for it. A second part of the Kuwaiti loan (€50 million) is still not approved and the needed public procurements will be finished by the end of 2018. Freight station in Zemun will be located between the existing stations Zemun and Zemun Polje, on the area of 35 ha (86 acres). Revitalization of the existing 6 km (3.7 mi) of tracks and 14,500 m^{2} (156,000 sq ft) of buildings will be followed by the construction of the 17 km (11 mi) of new tracks and additional 18,800 m^{2} (202,000 sq ft) of edifices. Deadline is also 2 years, but the works will start at the end of 2018. This means that the planned Belgrade railway junction won't be finished before 2021, at best. However, minister for transportation, Zorana Mihajlović, in December 2017 gave conflicting deadlines. She said that the station building in Prokop will be built from April 2018 to April 2019 and that freight station Zemun should be finished by the end of 2018. In October 2018 a deadline for finishing the Zemun station was extended to early 2022.

The question of the beltway remains. There is still no project for it, and it is needed especially for the hazardous materials which are now transported right through the city. It was announced that after the Main station is closed, these trains will use the much wider bypass route, Pančevo-Orlovat-Novi Sad railway, which is itself under reconstruction in January 2018. As a permanent solution, a track Beli Potok-Vinča-Pančevo will be built, but the project includes the road beltway along the same route and a road-railway bridge across the Danube. It is not known when it will be built, as the projected cost is €0.5 billion. In July 2018 the traffic around Kalemegdan was discontinued. As the beltway around the city is not set as a priority, city architect Milutin Folić in July 2018 stated that freight trains will use the routes of BG Voz and go through the tunnels below the central urban areas of the city. They will use it during the nights, when BG Voz is not operational.

In 2015, prime minister Aleksandar Vučić announced that the high-speed rail Belgrade-Budapest will be operational by 2018. In 2016 a contract was signed in Riga, Latvia, with Chinese companies China Communications Construction Company and China Railways International for the modernization of the Belgrade-Stara Pazova section. The section is 34.5 km (21.4 mi) long and the works include leveling of all crossings, uniformization of platforms, renovation of all station along the route, underground passages, formation of the green areas, etc. Station which will be reconstructed or adapted include New Belgrade, Tošin Bunar (which will be relocated a bit), Zemun, Zemun Polje, Batajnica, Nova Pazova and Stara Pazova, while stops at Altina and Kamendin will be added. The reconstruction has three phases: Prokop-Zemun, Zemun-Batajnica and Batajnica-Stara Pazova. Phase I and III will be done first. The freight and passenger tracks will be separated in the Batajnica-Stara Pazova section. Works started in November 2017 and the entire project should be finished in 36 months, by November 2020. When everything is said and done, the train speed in the Belgrade-Batajnica section will be 120 km/h (75 mph) and in Batajnica-Stara Pazova section up to 200 km/h (120 mph). In October 2019 the deadline was moved to fall of 2021.

On 1 February 2019 the traffic in the northern direction, towards Novi Sad, Subotica, Vienna and Budapest, was completely shut off. The modernization of the tracks was given as a reason, including the construction of the viaduct and tunnel Čortanovci (began on 11 August 2017, deadline 52 months), renovation of the Stara Pazova-Novi Sad section (16 March 2018, deadline 48 months) and the already mentioned Prokop-Stara Pazova section. Renovation of the bypass track for the freight transport to Novi Sad, almost twice longer that the regular one (102.5 km (63.7 mi), via Pančevo, Orlovat and Titel), was completed by January 2019. Also closed are the international lines to Hungary and Austria. Minister Mihajlović said that this is "partially force majeure", and that alternative bus transportation is organized. The traffic will be discontinued at least until 2022, or more than three years.

Complete shut down in February has been described as the "heart attack of the European artery in Serbia". As the passenger transportation was disrupted, the freight one was redirected right through the middle of the Belgrade junction, through the "Vračar" tunnel below downtown. City officials claimed that flammable and explosive materials are not allowed to be transported under the city, but they removed tracks which circled around the urban tissue, along the rivers, because of the Belgrade Waterfront, thus disrupting the transportation. Toxic and other hazardous material was then rerouted into the city tunnels. Railway company stated that this transport is organized only at night simply because of the "psychological reasons", not to irritate the commuters. Also, the experts warned that the Pančevo Bridge is not in good shape enough to take all the additional freight traffic. The CIP Institute originally drafted a plan which would make the Belgrade-Novi Sad railway operational during the entire period of high speed rail construction, but the state government buckled under the pressure from the Chinese investors and Russian contractors and closed it completely. Deputy mayor Goran Vesić stated that hazardous materials "were transported previously through the tunnels and it will continue in the future", saying that whoever says differently is lying. Railway company however, stated that this is not true and that hazardous materials were never transported under the city, but added that the transportation is safe, even though the safety study haven't been finished. There are 6 to 10 trains with hazardous materials passing daily. It was also pointed put that the Vračar tunnel wasn't even projected for the freight traffic.

Up-to-date expenditures in the Belgrade Junction exceed US$700 million. The major portion of the funds was spent for the freight facilities and the electrification scheme, while a portion was spent for the construction of the passenger facilities.

==== Closing of the Main station ====
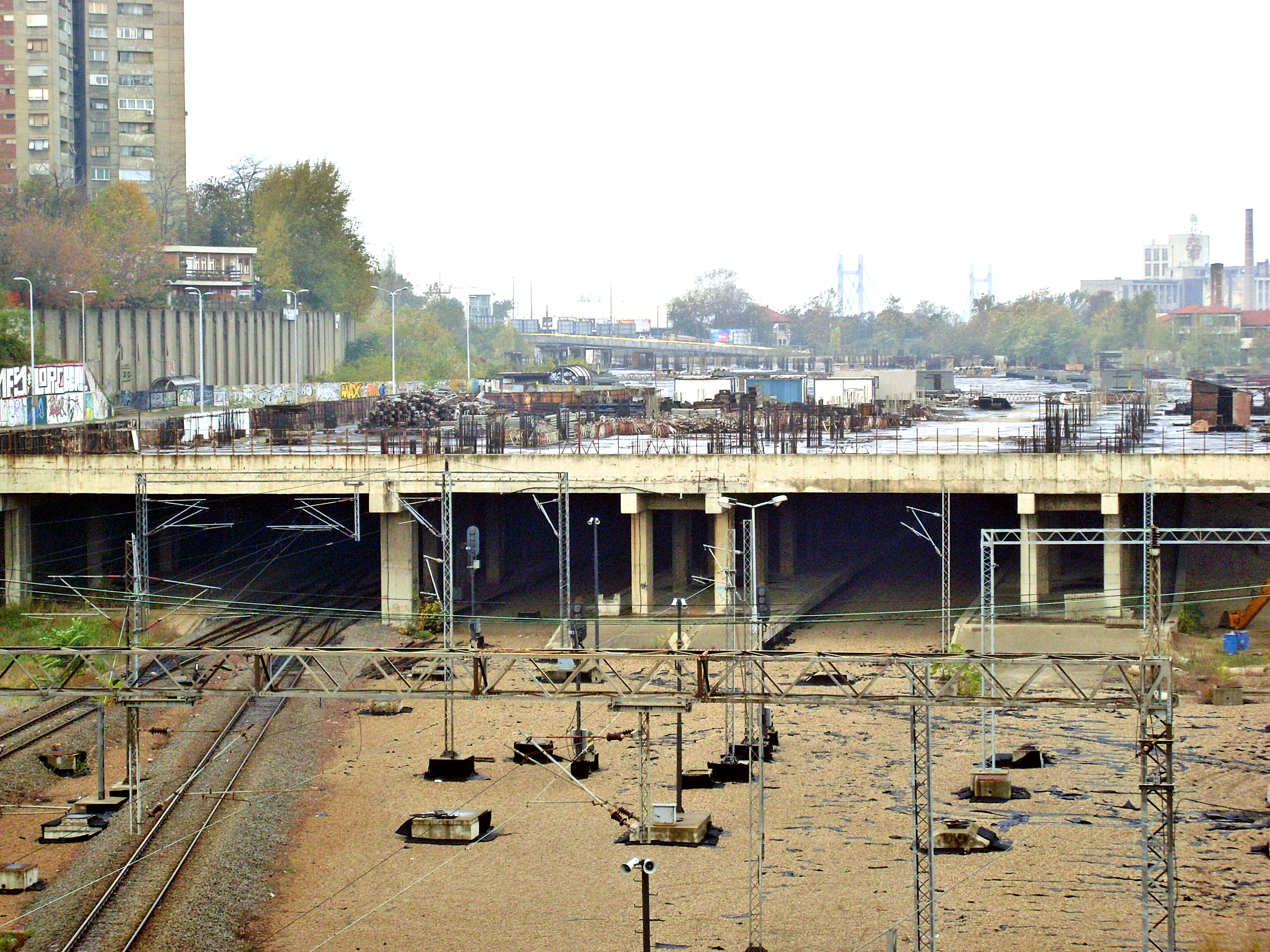
Construction site at Prokop

The Belgrade Main railway station was completely closed for traffic on 1 July 2018, after being operational for 134 years. Accordingly, the traffic via the route along the river banks, established around the Kalemegdan in 1935, was discontinued. The move met with the opposition from the experts and public, especially the notion that it has been hastily done because of the highly problematic and controversial Belgrade Waterfront project. Especially since, as of June 2018, it was estimated that in the best case scenario Prokop will become fully functional station, with all the necessary and supporting services, only in 2021.

General criticism of Prokop as the central station continued. Member of the Serbian Academy of Sciences and Arts and a public transportation expert, Vukan Vučić labeled Prokop as the "most disastrous error of the Belgrade transportation". He asserted that Prokop, in functional terms, is not a station at all and that, though it has been named Belgrade Center, is actually further from the city's center than the old station was. He added that the location is neglected, desperately bad choice and topographically inaccessible from all sides. As a result, commuters need almost 20 minutes to leave the station upon their arrival and have to travel for 3 to 4 km (1.9 to 2.5 mi) to downtown to reach other public transportation routes as Prokop itself is not interconnected. Another member of the Academy, transportation engineer Dušan Teodorović also criticized the project. As nothing of the planned infrastructure hasn't been built – urbanization and development of the neighborhood, numerous commercial objects, hotels, excellent commuting connections, two metro lines, taxi station – Vučić maintains that the isolation of the location will directly bring to the further decrease in the number of railway passengers. In June 2018 minister Mihajlović dismissed the criticism saying that the project is "attacked by those whose only contact with the railway is that they played with the toy trains as children".

Those who participated in the planning of the station maintain that Prokop was the best solution and that problem is that other parts of the plan weren't done or have been dropped completely. They say that the idea was to have only transient stations in the city and not the main, end station. Some of the missing infrastructure which they named, and which are considered megalomaniacal to begin with by the critics, include three additional railway stations (new or expanded: New Belgrade, Zemun, South), two additional bus stations (South, East) and lengthening and widening of the Deligradska Street from its current end at the highway, including the demolition of the urbanized hill of Maleško Brdo, east of Prokop.

At the same time, it was decided to start a series of reconstructions on the railways in Belgrade for which the announcement came quite late. The works, some of which were short and some long termed, including the level crossing in Resnik and previously started complete reconstruction of the Belgrade-Stara Pazova railroad. With previous recent changes, this completely disrupted the organization within the Belgrade railway junction in August 2018 and caused numerous further complications for the passengers. Reports described the entire situation as a "circus" with notions that only few months before no one could believe that such a mess will be made of the railway traffic.

Trains from central Serbia and Bar went only to Lazarevac, 62 km (39 mi) from Belgrade, where the passengers were taken over by the buses and transported to the city. In the opposite direction, passengers of the morning trains from Topčider were first transported by the buses to Lazarevac, while the evening trains circled across the half of Serbia, via Mala Krsna, Lapovo, Kraljevo and Užice. Trains from Bar which traversed through Belgrade to Subotica, were also stopped at Lazarevac and the passengers used buses to reach Prokop. In the southern direction, to Niš and Sofia, trains travelled only to Mladenovac, 53 km (33 mi) from Belgrade. Trains from the Syrmia region (Šid, Sremska Mitrovica) instead of the central station, were shortened to the local stations Zemun, Batajnica and New Belgrade. The works caused problems is general, as it happened for the trains to depart with lengthy delays or travel up to 3 times longer than they should which caused fallouts between the passengers and conductors. Some of the changes happen without public announcements, so passengers would come to one station only to find out that their trains depart from another station, across the city. Additionally, none of the changes were synchronized with the city's public transportation.

Though itself inadequately equipped, the Novi Beograd railway station initially de facto took over the role of the main station, as it is better connected with other parts of the city and way more accessible than the Prokop. By early 2019 it came out as one of the busiest stations.

=== 2020s ===
Projected in 2008, and in 2015 announced for 2016, construction of the massive intermodal freight terminal ("dry port") in Batajnica began on 13 November 2020. The joint Serbian-Russian scientific and technological council was formed to develop and advance Belgrade's railway system and the tracks grid. The joint project was titled "Belgrade's diagrams" and the first session was held in May 2021.

The Topčider station was closed again on 1 October 2021 and all lines were rerouted to Prokop, leaving the city without a facility to load cars as the Zemun freight station still wasn't finished. The loading facility became operational on 17 June 2022. The traffic to Novi Sad, via the new, high-speed rail, was restored on 19 March 2022 - five and a half years since the construction began, three years since the traffic was completely shut down and year and a half after the original deadline. Ceremony was attended by the president of Serbia, Aleksandar Vučić, and prime minister of Hungary, Viktor Orbán.

Transportation minister Tomislav Momirović confirmed in March 2022 that the New Belgrade railway station "will remain" the busiest one, not only in Belgrade but in the entire Serbia, and majority of passengers on the opening of the high-speed rail used this station. The Prokop remained hampered with numerous problems, and by this time it became apparent that, though it may become an important station in the future, it will never take the role of the former Main railway station. Further solidifying the position of the New Belgrade station as the future central hub, is the decision to build the new Belgrade's central bus station (which used to be back to back to the Main railway station), next to the New Belgrade railway station. By July 2023, there were 140 trains passing through the New Belgrade railway station on workdays.

In August 2023, president Vučić announced construction of the 18 km (11 mi) long railway from Prokop to the Belgrade Nikola Tesla Airport by 2026. "Not longer than 15-25 minutes", the route will go via the Zemun, Altina, Zemun Polje and Singidunum stations. After the 2027 EXPO and construction of the new national stadium in the area, the railway will be extended to the stadium and then further to Jakovo, Surčin and Obrenovac.

== Infrastructure ==
=== Tunnels ===
- Dedinje Tunnel
- Vračar Tunnel
- Karaburma Tunnel
- Senjak Tunnel
- Stadium Tunnel
- Tunnels connecting rail lines
- Bifurcation in the Kneževac tunnel

=== Bridges ===
- New Railway Bridge
- Triple Bridge viaduct over Belgrade-Niš Highway
- Viaduct over Rakovica-Resnik railway
- Triple Bridge viaduct over Belgrade-Novi Sad Highway
- Double Bridge viaduct over Boulevard of Patriarch Pavle

=== Railway stations ===
- Zemun railway station
- Prokop railway station
- Rakovica railway station
- Vukov Spomenik railway station
- Pančevo Bridge railway station
- Karađorđe's Park railway station
- Tošin Bunar railway station
- Kneževac railway station
- Batajnica railway station
- Zemun Polje railway station
- Resnik railway station
- Jajinci railway station
- Surčin railway station
- Ostružnica railway station

=== Technical and freight stations ===
- Zemun technical railway station
- Kijevo technical railway station
- Belgrade marshalling yard (Makiš freight station)

=== Railways ===
- Belgrade Centre - Novi Beograd - Zemun - Batajnica railway
- Belgrade Centre - Vukov Spomenik - Pančevo Bridge railway
- Belgrade Centre - Rakovica - Resnik railway

=== Gallery ===
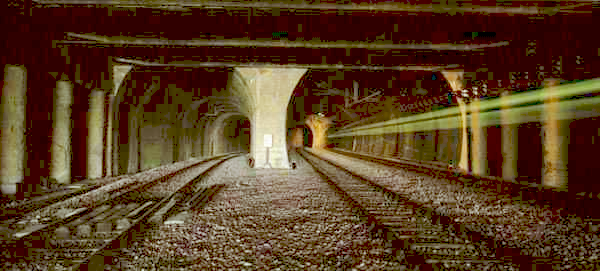
Dedinje Tunnel bifurcation

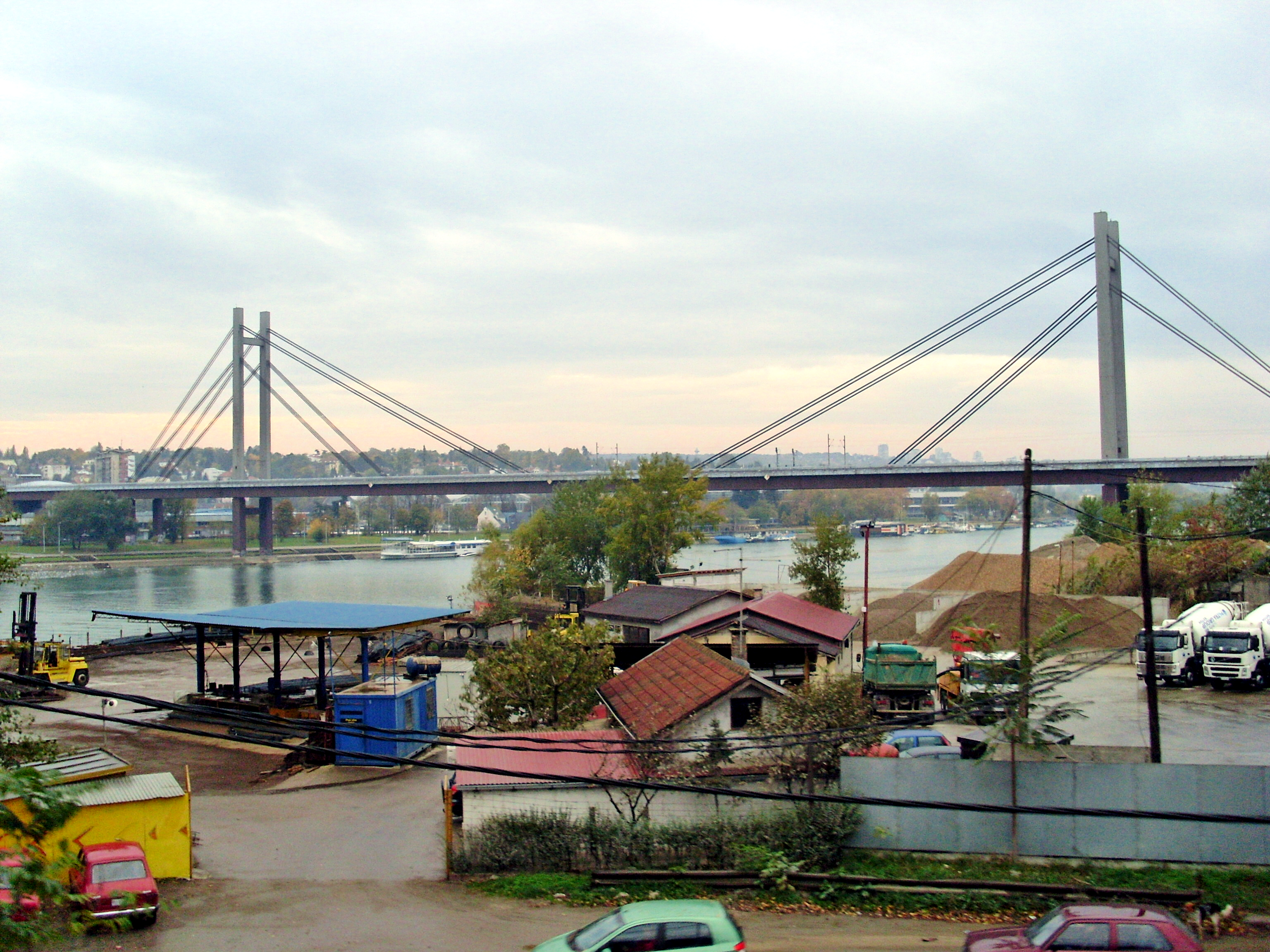
New Railway Bridge

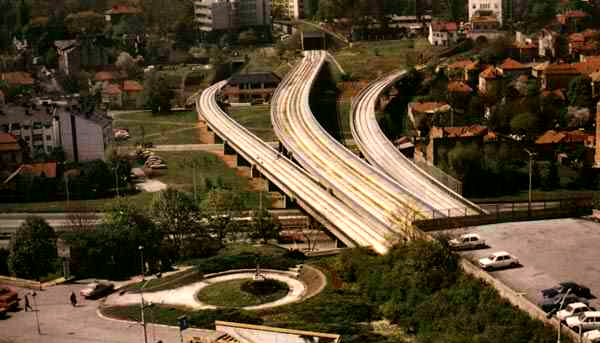
Vračar tunnel with viaducts crossing the Belgrade highway

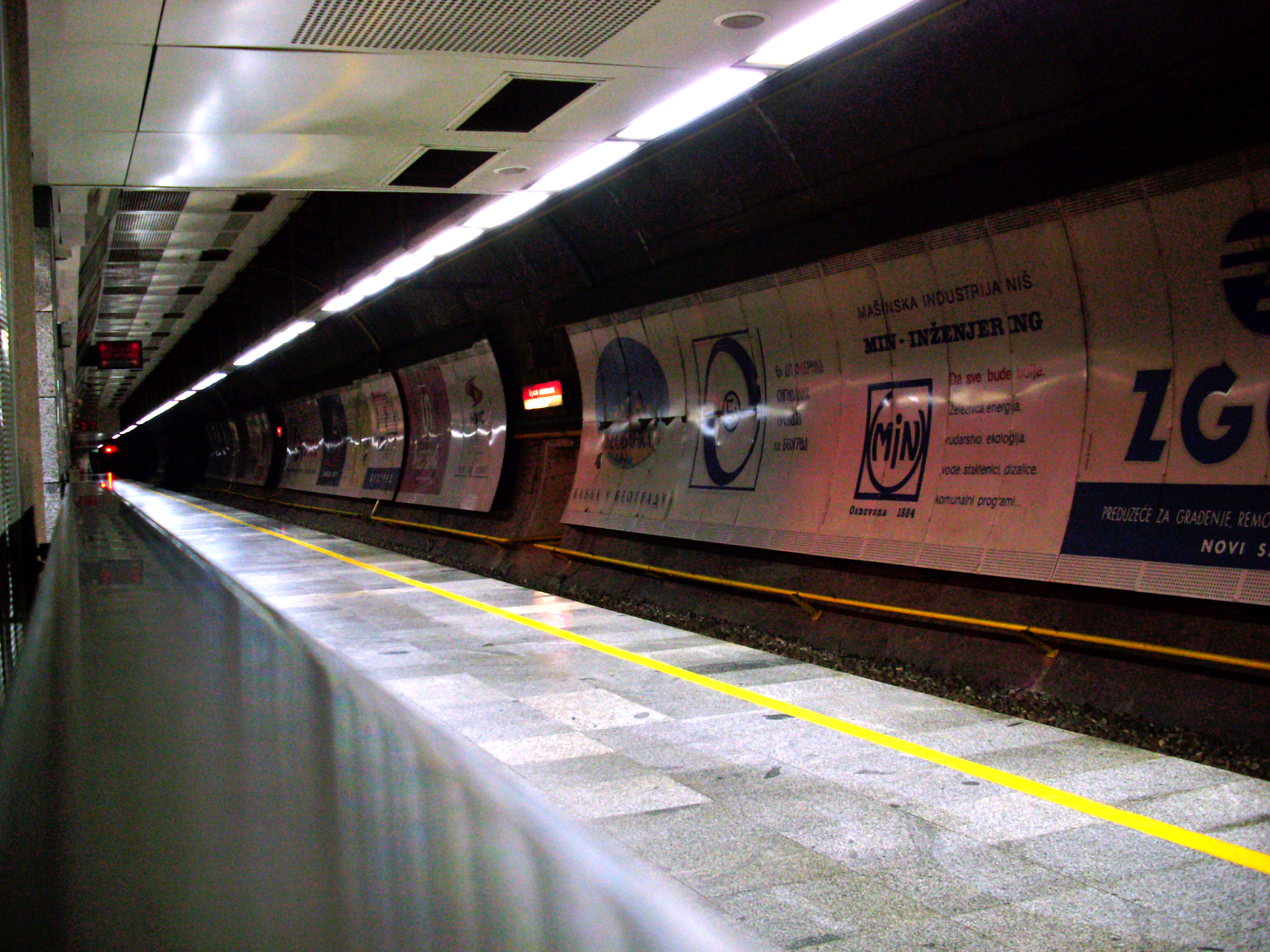
Underground station Vukov spomenik

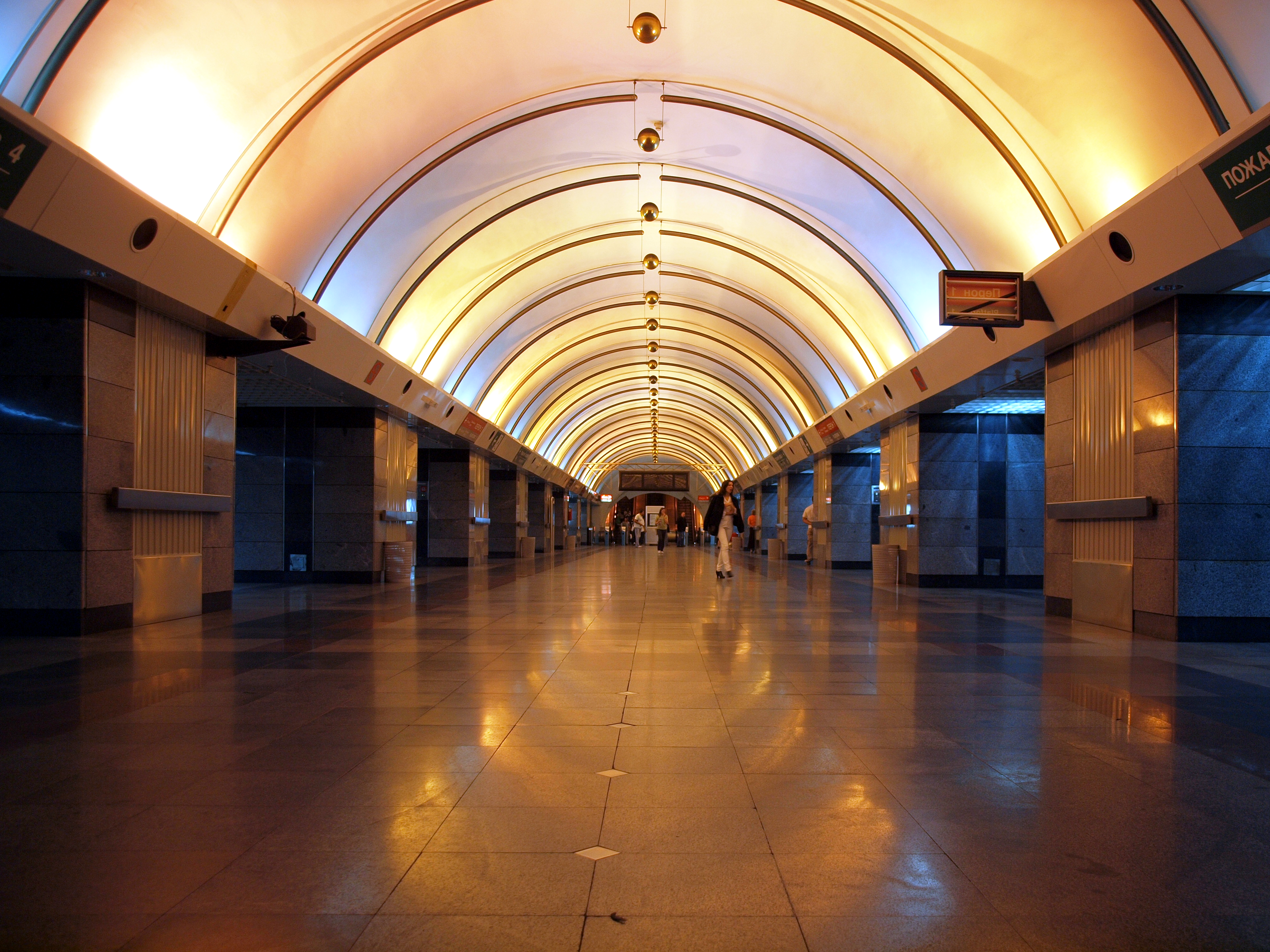
Vukov spomenik was opened in 1995

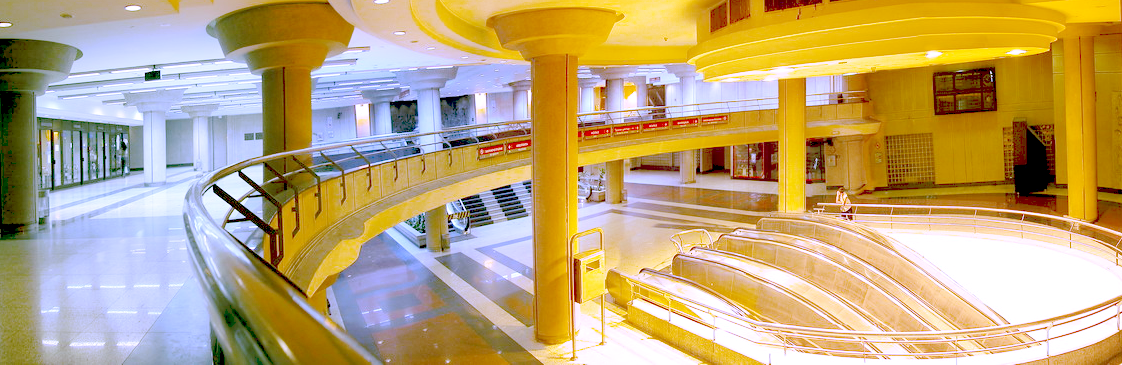
Gallery at Vukov spomenik
