= Kamendin railway station =

Railway station in Serbia

Kamendin Камендин
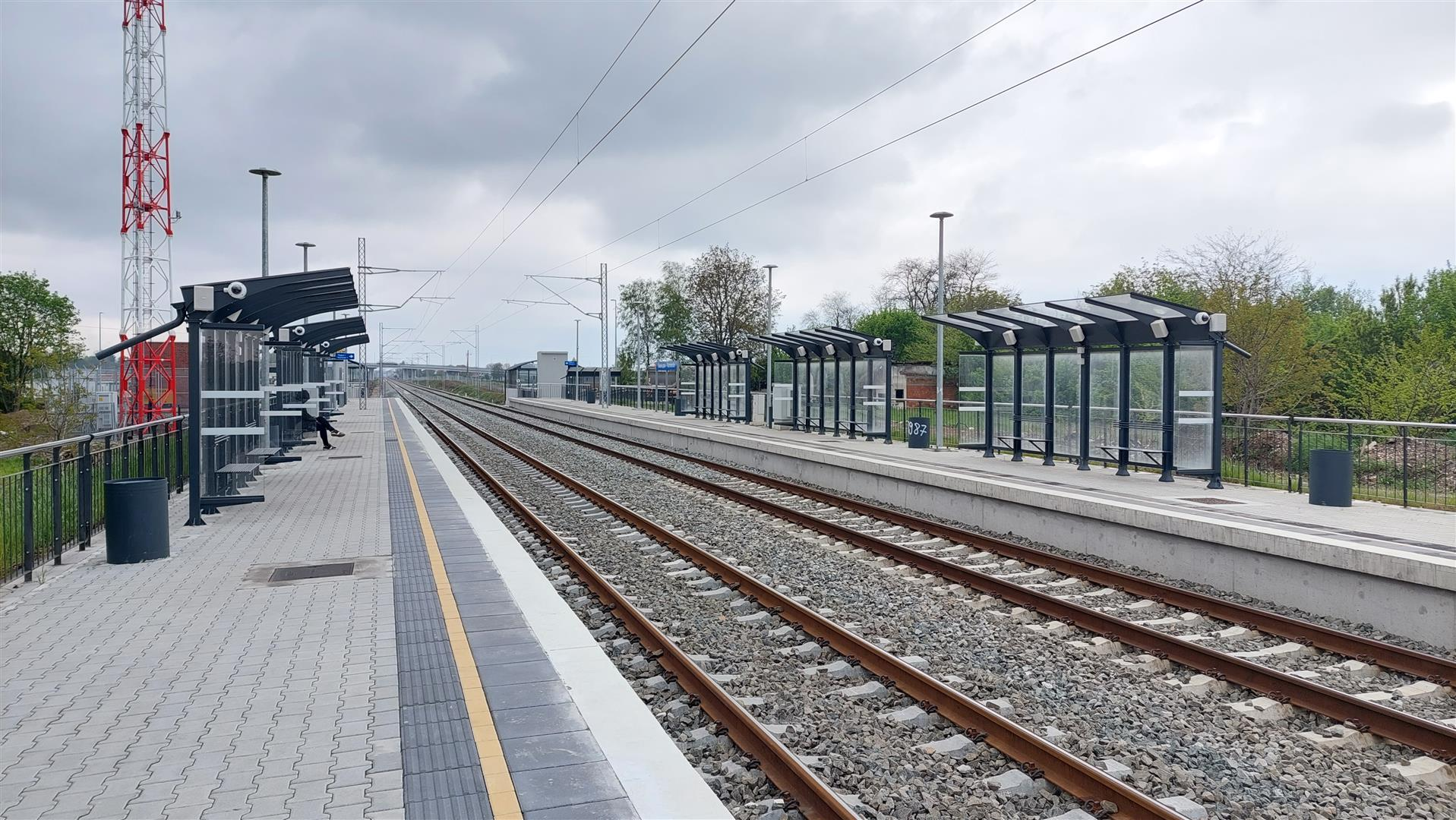
- View from platform I, looking toward Zemun Polje

General information
- Location: Zemun; Serbia
- Coordinates: 44°52′02″N 20°19′14″E
- Platforms: 2 side platforms
- Connections: Bus 704, 707, 709

Construction
- Structure type: At-grade
- Parking: No
- Cycle facilities: Outdoor railings
- Accessible: Yes; elevators

History
- Opened: 2022
Route map
Location

The Kamendin railway station is a railway stop that serves the Zemun Polje and Kamendin neighborhoods of Zemun, Serbia. It is located on railway line 101/105, between Zemun Polje and Batajnica railway stations, at the location of a former level crossing.

Along with the nearby Altina train stop, the Kamendin stop was constructed as part of the Belgrade–Novi Sad railway reconstruction of 2019–2022. It is served by BG Voz urban rail trains.

== Layout ==
The stop has two side platforms, each 110 meters long, serving two tracks. The platforms are connected by an underground passageway.

== Services and access ==
The stop is equipped with elevators, and features an automated public address system. Bicycle parking is marked by the hand railings.

Nearby are bus stops served by city bus lines 704, 707 and 709.

== Gallery ==
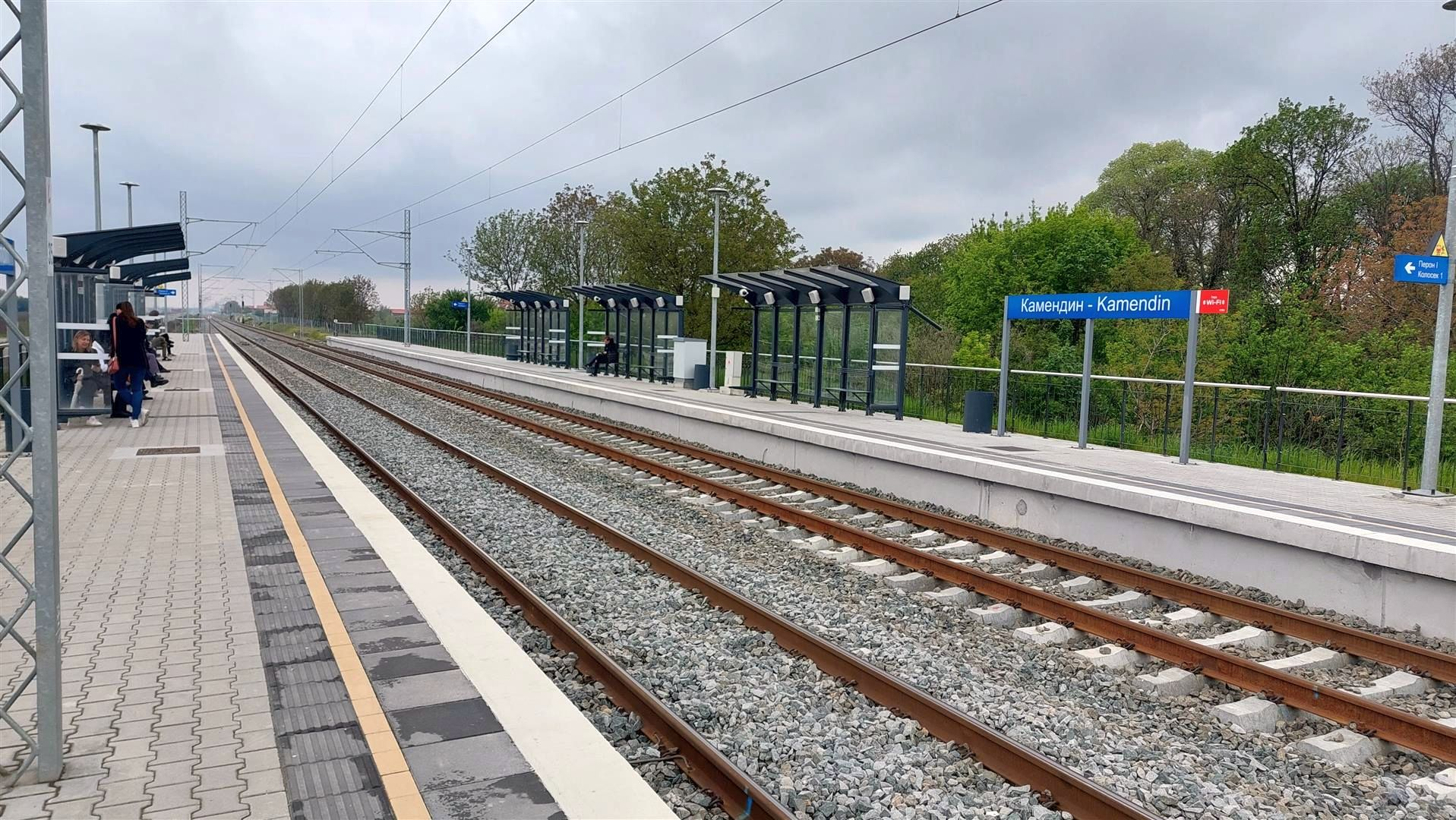
View from platform II, looking toward Batajnica station

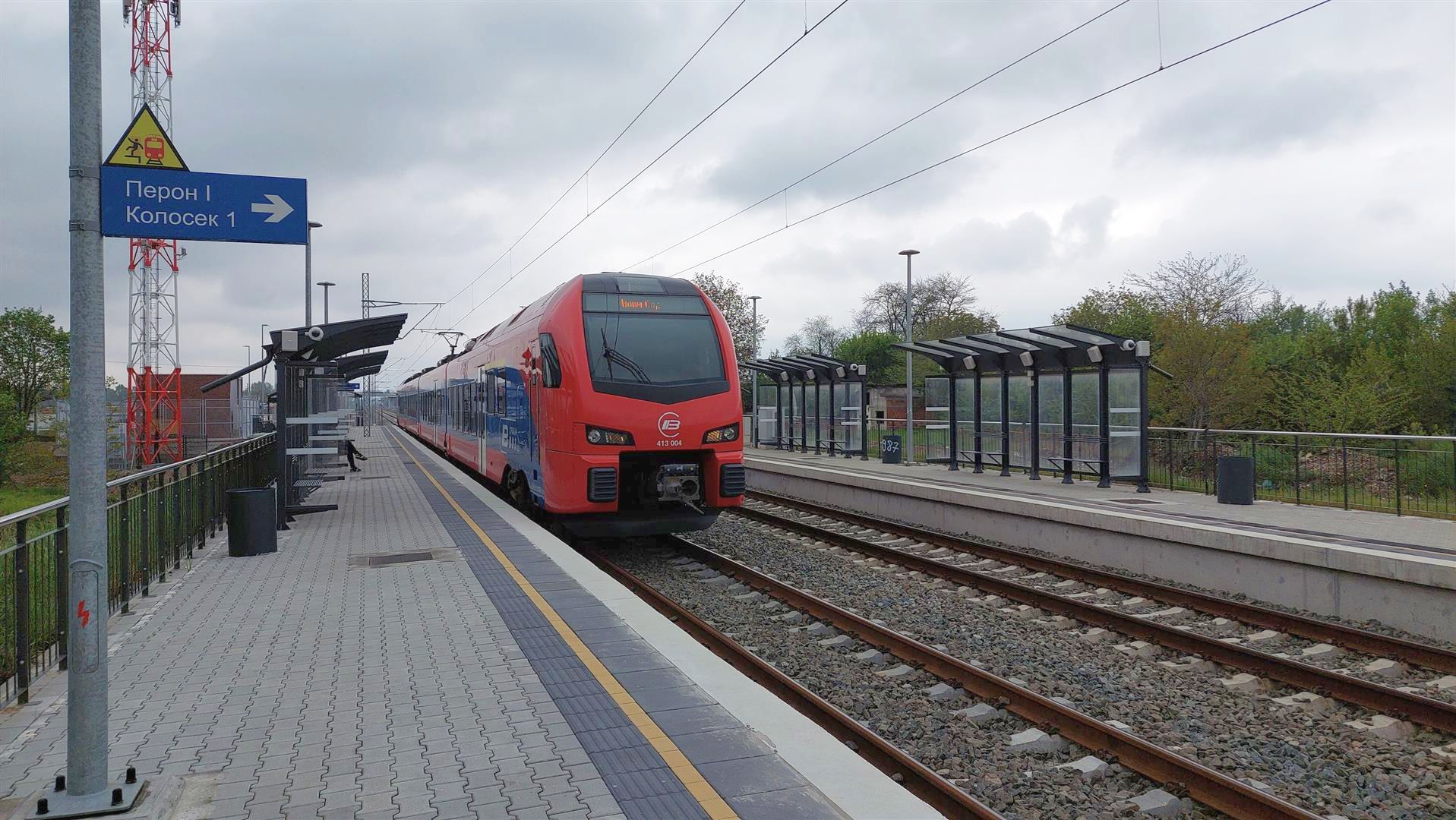
Regio service to Novi Sad passing through on track 1

== See also ==
- BG Voz
