= Altina railway station =

Railway station in Serbia

Altina Алтина
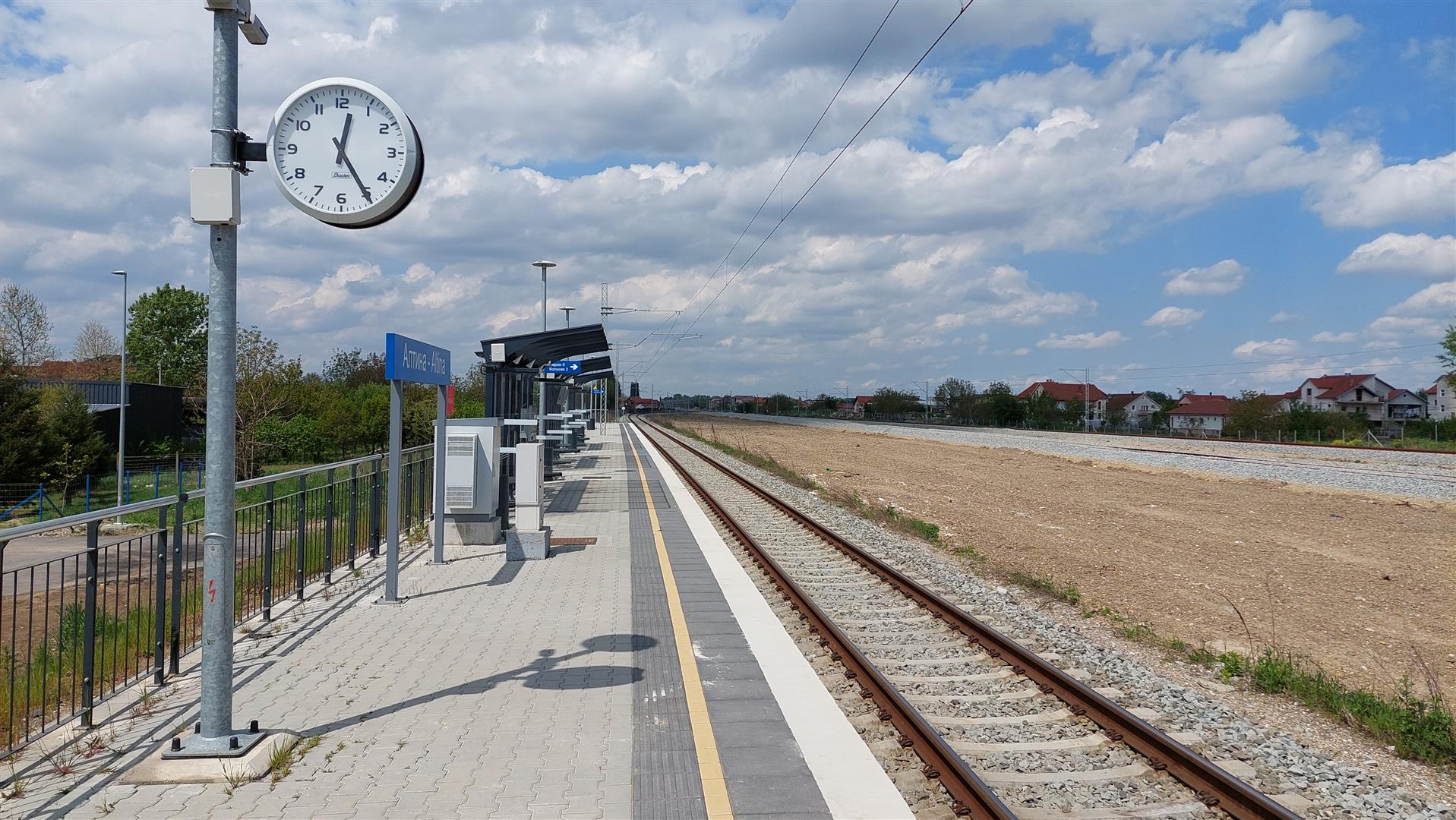
- View from platform II, looking toward Zemun Polje

General information
- Location: Zemun; Serbia
- Coordinates: 44°51′01″N 20°20′44″E
- Platforms: 2 side platforms
- Tracks: 3
- Connections: Bus 81, 81L

Construction
- Structure type: At-grade
- Parking: Free parking lots
- Cycle facilities: Outdoor racks
- Accessible: Elevators (under construction); Braille

History
- Opened: 2022
Route map
Location

The Altina railway station is a railway stop that serves the Altina neighborhood of Zemun, Serbia. It is located on railway line 101/105, between Zemun and Zemun Polje railway stations.

Along with the nearby Kamendin train stop, the Altina stop was constructed as part of the Belgrade–Novi Sad railway reconstruction of 2019–2022. It is served by BG Voz urban rail trains.

== Layout ==
The stop has two side platforms, each 110 meters long, serving two tracks that are some 50 meters apart. Between them runs a service track leading to the nearby Zemun marshalling yard. The platforms are connected by an underground passageway.

== Services and access ==
The stop has free parking lots and bicycle racks outside both platforms. Elevator shafts have been constructed but the elevators were not put in use as of April 2022. The stop features an automated public address system and information in Braille on hand railings.

Nearby are bus stops served by city bus lines 81 and 81L.

== Gallery ==
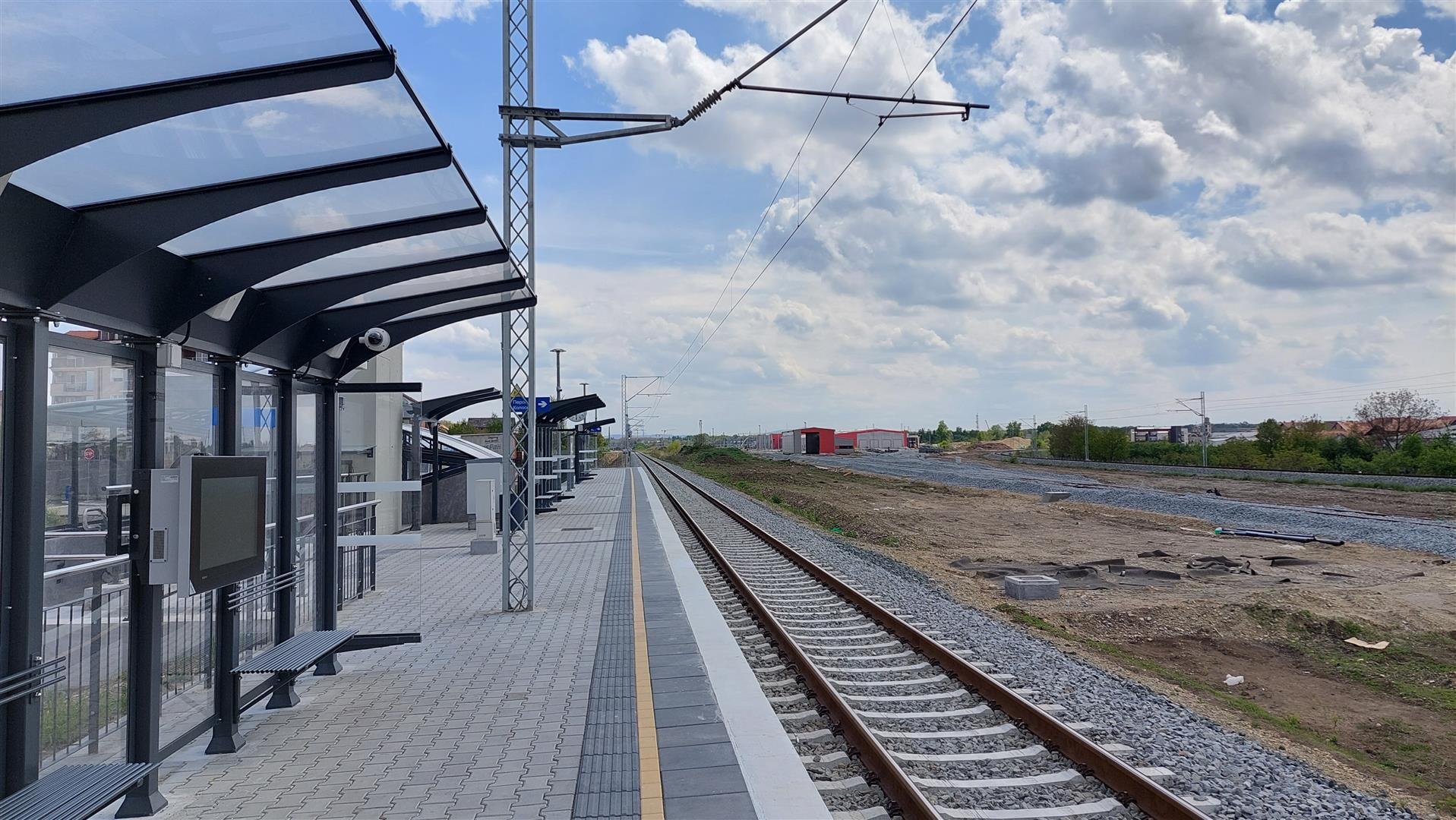
View from platform I, looking toward Zemun station

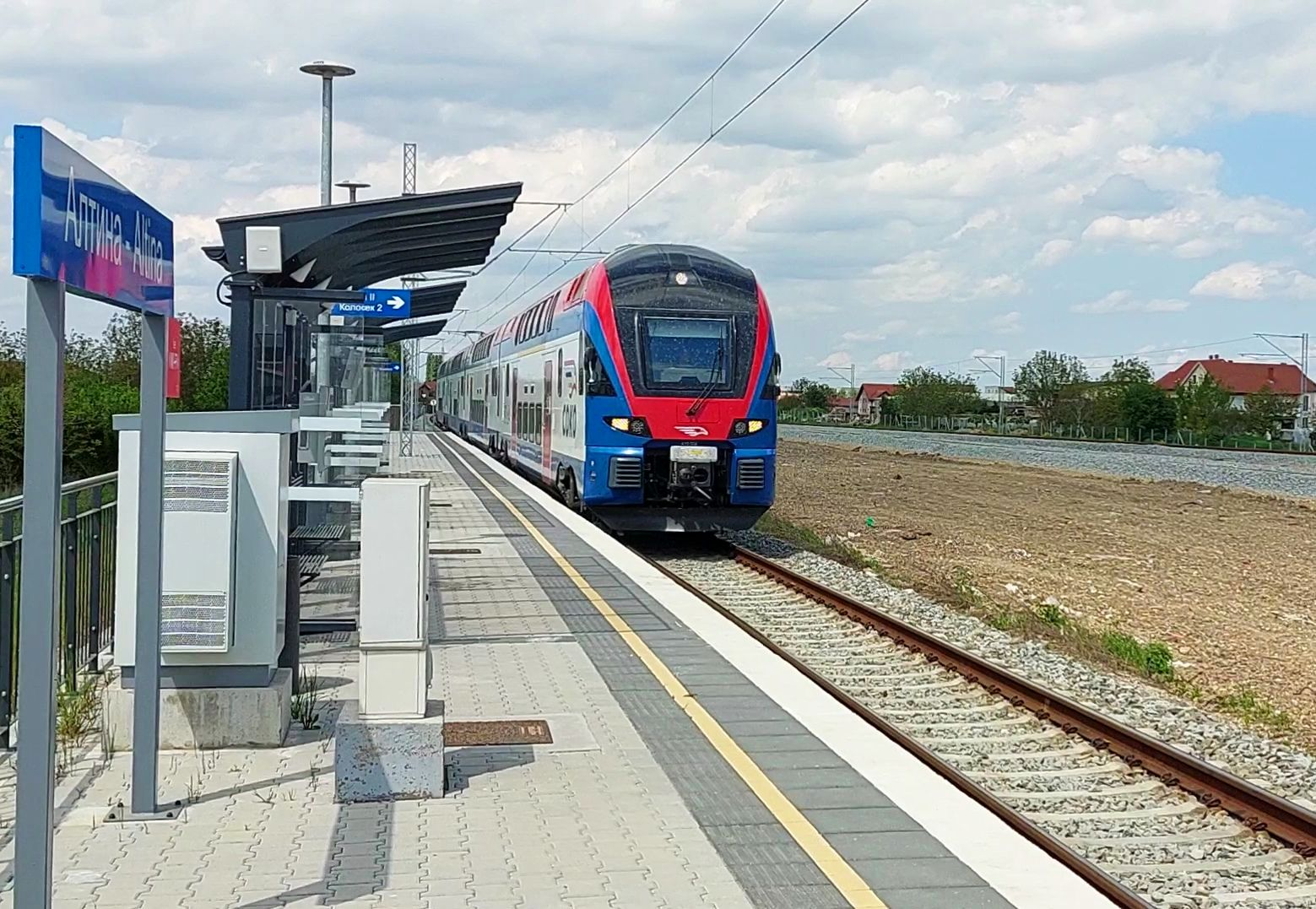
InterCity train Soko passing through on track 2

== See also ==
- BG Voz
