= Mirjana Radojević =

Serbian politician

Member of the Assembly of Vojvodina
- In office 2016–2020

Personal details
- Born: 1990 (age 35–36)
- Party: Serbian Progressive Party
- Occupation: Journalist, politician

Mirjana Radojević (Serbian Cyrillic: Мирјана Радојевић; born 1990) is a politician in Serbia. She served in the Assembly of Vojvodina from 2016 to 2020 as a member of the Serbian Progressive Party.

== Private career ==
Radojević is a graduated journalist. She lives in Nova Pazova in the municipality of Stara Pazova.

== Politician ==
Radojević received the twenty-second position on the Progressive Party's electoral list in the 2016 Vojvodina provincial election and was elected when the list won a majority victory with sixty-three out of 120 mandates. She served with the government's majority for the next four years and did not seek re-election in 2020.
