= Surčin railway station =

Railway station in Belgrade, Serbia

Coordinates: 44°48′22″N 20°14′48″E

Surčin railway station Железничка станица Сурчин
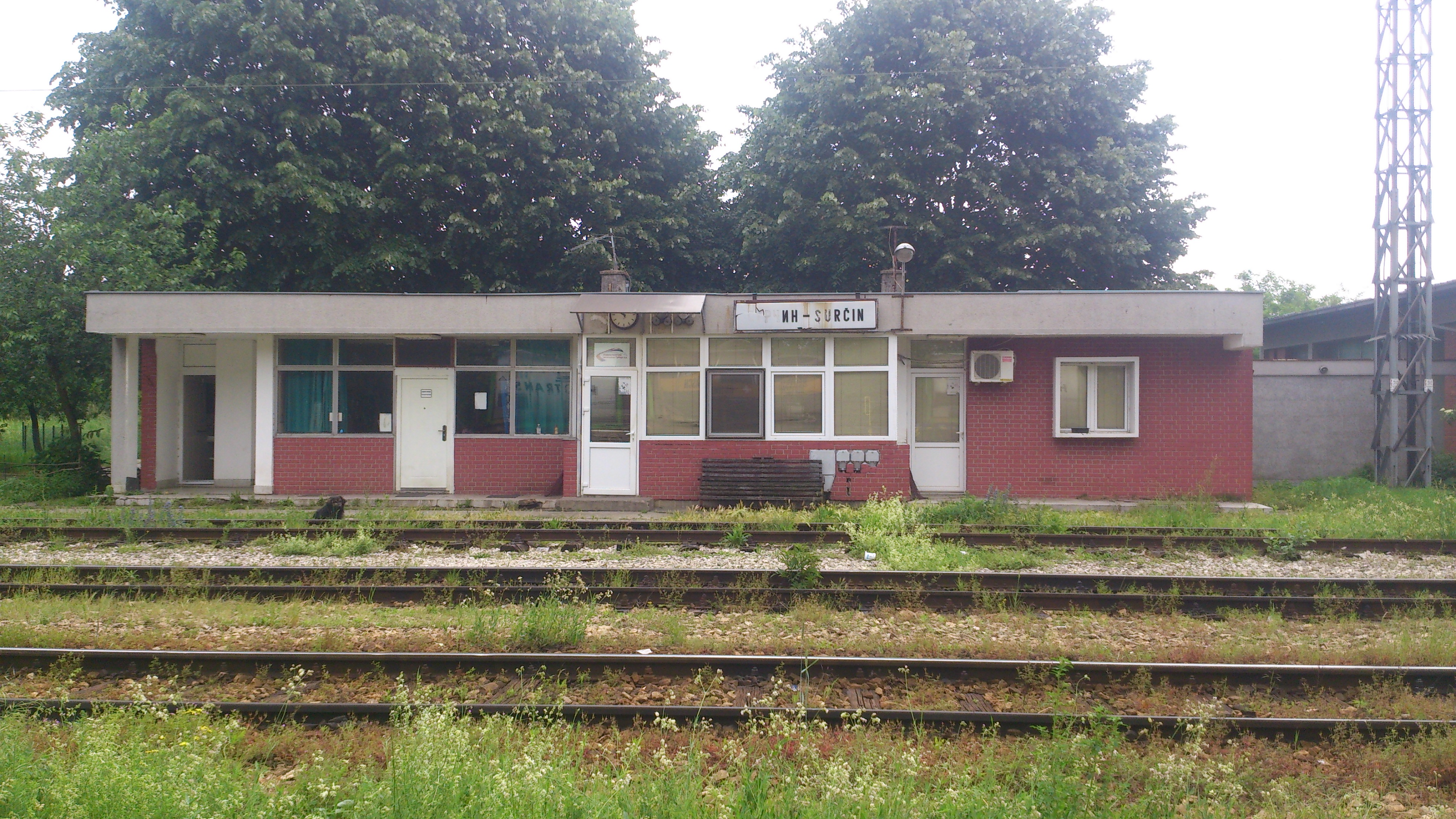

General information
- Location: Serbia
- Tracks: 5
Location

Surčin railway station (Serbian: Железничка станица Сурчин) is a railway station of Belgrade railway junction. Located in Surčin, Belgrade, Serbia. Railroad continued to Batajnica in one, and Ostružnica in the other direction. Surčin railway station consists of 5 railway track.

== See also ==
- Serbian Railways
