= Josias Kumpf =

- Born: April 7, 1925; Nova Pazova, Yugoslavia (now Serbia)
- Died: October 15, 2009 (aged 84); Vienna, Austria
- Known for: Former Nazi concentration camp guard accused of taking part in genocide

Josias Kumpf (April 7, 1925 – October 15, 2009) was a Yugoslav-born man who served as concentration camp guard for Nazi Germany during the Holocaust.

== Biography ==
=== World War II ===
Josias Kumpf, an ethnic-German or Volksdeutsche born in Yugoslavia, served under the SS guard forces at Sachsenhausen in 1942 at the age of 17 and served there for about a year before transferring to Trawniki concentration camp in the General Government. Kumpf was accused of having taken part in the Holocaust; including a November 1943 German operation that went by the code name Aktion Erntefest (Operation Harvest festival) in which, over two days, 43,000 Jewish men, women and children were murdered at three Nazi camps in eastern German-occupied Poland. He was active during the murder of 8,000 Jews on November 3, 1943, in Trawniki concentration camp, where it was his task to stand guard over a pit where prisoners were being gunned down and "finish off" the wounded, albeit he claimed to have never discharged his weapon.

=== Post-war ===
After World War II, he emigrated to the United States in 1956 and settled in Illinois, becoming a naturalized United States citizen in 1964. He worked as a sausage maker for the Vienna Hot Dog Company in Chicago before retiring in 1990. He moved to Wisconsin to be with his daughter after his wife died in 2000.

=== Denaturalization and deportation ===
The United States Justice Department first approached Kumpf about his World War II-era activities in 2001. As a result of this investigation, on September 30, 2003, the United States sued to strip him of his U.S. nationality. He was formally stripped of his U.S. citizenship on May 10, 2005, and his denaturalization was upheld by the United States Court of Appeals for the Seventh Circuit on February 24, 2006.

After Kumpf exhausted his denaturalization appeals, the United States initiated deportation proceedings against him on July 14, 2006. He was ordered deported by an immigration judge on January 4, 2007, which was upheld by the Board of Immigration Appeals on June 16, 2008. After Kumpf exhausted his deportation appeals, he was taken from his home by immigration officials on March 18, 2009, and deported to Austria the next day. However, Austria was unable to prosecute him because the statute of limitations had expired.

On September 17, 2009, Spain charged Kumpf and asked for his extradition. Before the extradition request could be processed, however, Kumpf died that October 15 in Wilhelminenspital in Vienna.
