= Ostružnica railway station =

Railway station in Belgrade, Serbia

Coordinates: 44°43′52″N 20°19′59″E

Ostružnica railway station Железничка станица Остружница

General information
- Location: Serbia
- Tracks: 4
Location

Ostružnica railway station (Serbian: Железничка станица Остружница) is a railway station of Belgrade railway junction. Located in Ostružnica, Belgrade, Serbia. Railroad continued to Surčin in one, in the other direction to Belgrade marshalling yard "A", in third direction to Belgrade marshalling yard "B", in fourth direction to Jajinci and the fifth direction towards to Resnik. Ostružnica railway station railway station consists of 4 railway tracks.

== See also ==
- Serbian Railways
