= Jajinci railway station =

Railway station in Serbia

Coordinates: 44°43′19″N 20°27′26″E

Jajinci railway station Железничка станица Јајинци
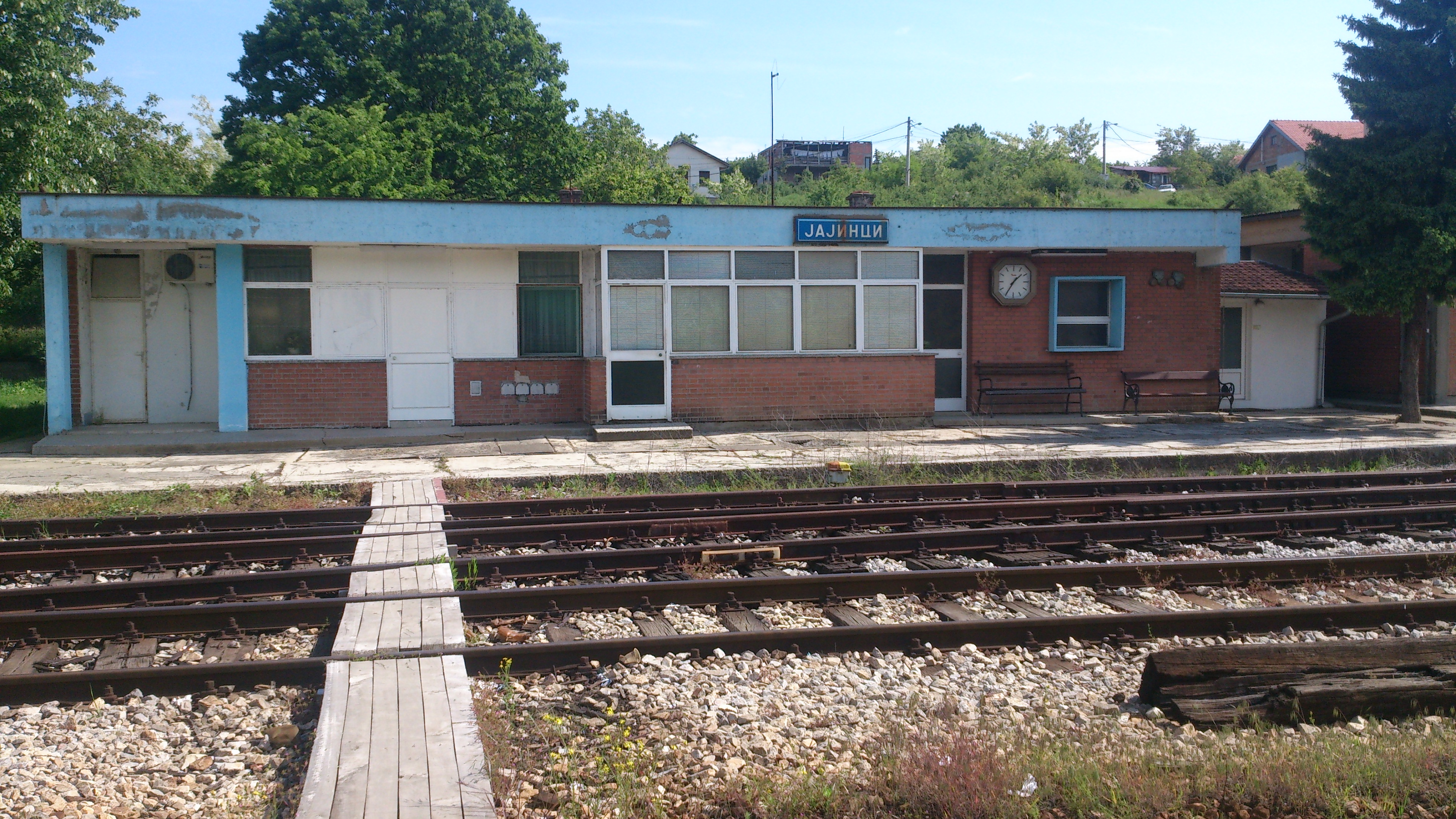

General information
- Location: Serbia
- Tracks: 4
Location

Jajinci railway station (Serbian: Железничка станица Јајинци) is a railway station of Belgrade railway junction and Belgrade–Požarevac railway. Located in northern part of Resnik, Rakovica, Belgrade. Railroad continues to Beli Potok in one, in the other direction to Rakovica, in third direction to Belgrade marshalling yard "A" and in the fourth direction towards to Ostružnica. Jajinci railway station consists of 4 railway tracks.

== See also ==
- Serbian Railways
