= KUD Mladost Nova Pazova =

Serbian cultural organization for youth

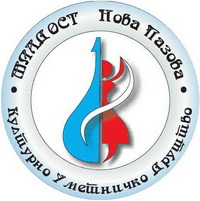
- Artistic Society Mladost Nova Pazova - Logo
- Formation: 1953
- Headquarters: Nova Pazova

KUD Mladost Nova Pazova (Artistic Society Mladost Nova Pazova) is a Serbian cultural organisation established in 1953. It positively supports youth with interest and talent in dance, folk music, theater, poetry and other forms of artistic creation. KUD Mladost NP affirms cultural values of the Serbian people and other people who live in the territory of the Republic of Serbia. KUD Mladost NP is a member of the CIOFF Serbia Association since 2003.

== Sections ==
- Small art workshop
- Drama club
- Folklore
- Women's singing group
- Folk dance orchestra

== International travel and performance ==
The National Folklore Ensemble and Folk Dance Orchestra has traveled to and performed in:

1. Poland
2. Ukraine
3. Slovakia
4. Hungary
5. Romania
6. Bulgaria
7. North Macedonia
8. Bosnia and Herzegovina (Serbian Republic)
9. Slovenia
10. Sicily (Italy)
11. Brazil

The Women's Singing Group has traveled to and performed in:

1. Slovakia
2. Hungary
3. Romania
4. Bulgaria
5. Bosnia and Herzegovina (Serbian Republic)

The Small art workshop has traveled to Bitola in Macedonia.

== Program of folk dance ensembles ==
Past performances of the Folk Dance Ensemble are listed below.

Serial number	Choreography	Choreographer	Musical Arrangement	Photo	Choreography description	Music or Video
1	The dances from Srem Dance duration 7 minute	Vladimir Spasojević	Saša Mazinjanin		String of dances and songs from Srem. showing the authentic costume from Srem, a large number of cheerful songs and dances from that area.	YouTube
2.	Bunjevke dance Dance duration 6 minute	Branko Marković	Dušan Šaponja		Typical and popular dance from northern Vojvodina. Various folk dance-steps and typical music from the area. Weather-bells on dancers’ boots. Original and colourful costumes.	YouTube
3	Vlach dances Dance duration 6 minute	Milan Vujinović	Velja Cvetković		Quick and high-spirited dance of east Serbia; shows characteristic way of dancing in that area.	YouTube
4	Shumadija dances Dance duration 6 minute	Branko Marković	Dušan Šaponja		A medley of dances from the central part of Serbia; Jolly dances with small steps and floral costumes, typical for this region	
5	Shopsko trojno Dance duration 2 minute	Branko Marković	Dušan Šaponja		A dynamic dance of three boys, as a representation of the happy spirit of southeast Serbia	
6	Dances from south-eastern Serbia – Bugarka Dance duration 7 minute	Vladimir Spasojević	Saša Mazinjanin		High-spirited dances of southeastern Serbia; highlights young men and women who show much strength and endurance.	
7	Dances from Eastern Serbia - Timok Dance duration 8 minute	Dobrivoje Putnik	Borivoje Ilić		Dance originated in eastern Serbia. Demonstrates the richness of costumes, music, and history of the Serbian people. The leading male dancer represents fighting for the freedom of the people.	
8	Bulgarian dances Dance duration 8 minute	Dragomir Vuković	Petar Josimović			
9	Dances from Leskovac Dance duration 8 minute	Vladimir Spasojević	Saša Mazinjanin			
10	Dances from Vranjsko Polje Dance duration 8 minute	Slaviša Đukić	Saša Mazinjanin			YouTube
11	Lindio dance - a quick dance from Herzegovina Dance duration 5 minute'	Branko Marković	Dušan Šaponja		Dances originating from the geographical region of western Hercegovina. Mediterranean music and costumes demonstrate the cheerful temperament of the regional population. The dance crier makes witty calls to the dancers, followed by a single instrument (Ljericom).	YouTube
12	The silent wheel - a dance from Glamoch Dance duration 6 minute	Drago Kecman				
13	Vranje suite Dance duration 8 minute	Branko Marković	Dragoljub Šarković			YouTube

"Dance from White Carniola"
Youth folk dance orchestra of the Artistic Society Mladost Nova Pazova (LIVE), Kraljevo on June 6, 2010
