= Belgrade marshalling yard =

Coordinates: 44°44′27″N 20°22′22″E

Belgrade marshalling yard Ранжирна железничка станица Београд
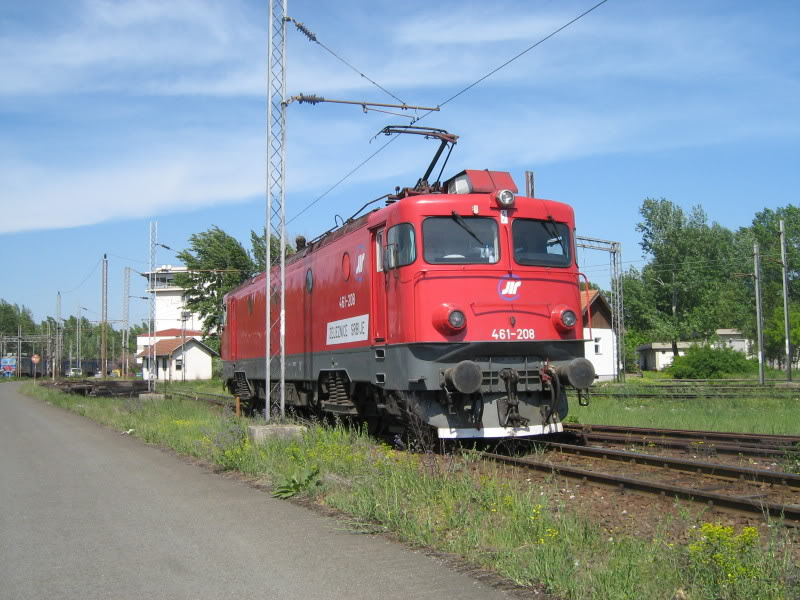
- ŽS 461 208 in Belgrade marshalling yard

General information
- Location: Serbia
- Tracks: 120
Location

Belgrade marshalling yard (Serbian: Ранжирна железничка станица Београд) or Makiš railway station (Железничка станица Макиш-Ранжирна), or Makiš freight station, is a classification yard of the Belgrade railway junction and the largest railway station in Serbia. It is located in the neighbourhood of Makiš in Čukarica of Belgrade. The railroad continues to Ostružnica in one line via park A, in the other direction to Ostružnica via park B, in third direction to Resnik via junction B near Železnik and junction K of Belgrade railway junction near Petlovo Brdo, in fourth direction to Resnik via junction R in the tunnel below Vidikovac and junction A near Kneževac, in the fifth direction to Rakovica via park B and junction R, in the sixth direction to Rakovica via park A and junction T, in the seventh direction to Rakovica via park B and junction T per second line and the eight towards direction to Jajinci. Belgrade marshalling yard consists of 120 railway tracks.

== See also ==
- Serbian Railways
- Belgrade railway junction
