= Batajnica railway station =

Railway station in Belgrade, Serbia

Coordinates: 44°53′51″N 20°16′24″E

Batajnica Батајница
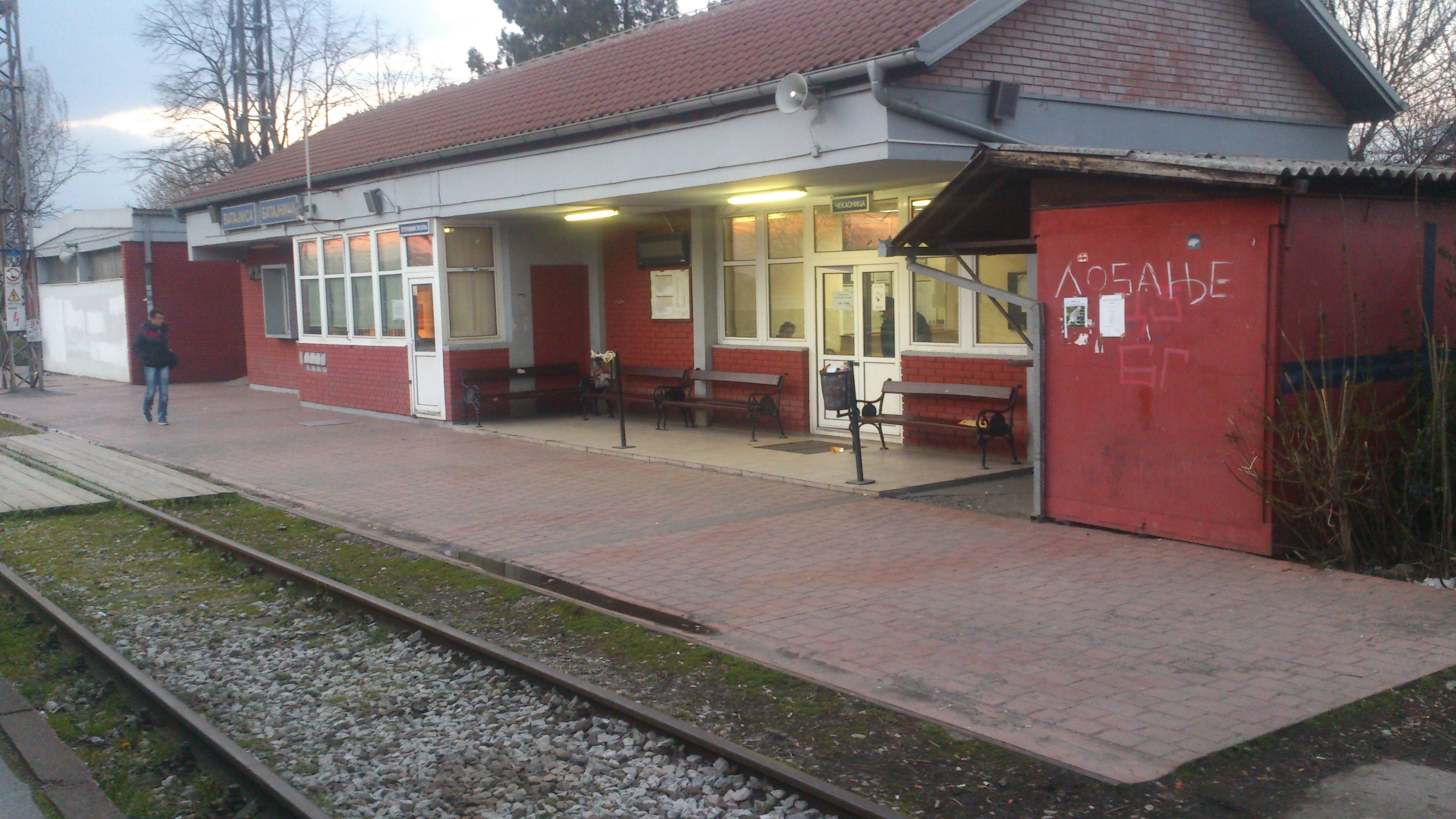

General information
- Location: Serbia
- Tracks: 11
Location

Batajnica railway station is a railway station of Belgrade railway junction, Belgrade–Šid and Belgrade–Subotica railway. Located in Batajnica, Zemun, Belgrade. Railroad continued to Nova Pazova in one, in the other direction to Zemun Polje and the third direction towards to Surčin. Batajnica railway station consists of 11 railway track.

== See also ==
- Serbian Railways
- Beovoz
- BG Voz
