= Zemun Polje railway station =

Railway station in Belgrade, Serbia

Coordinates: 44°51′28″N 20°20′04″E

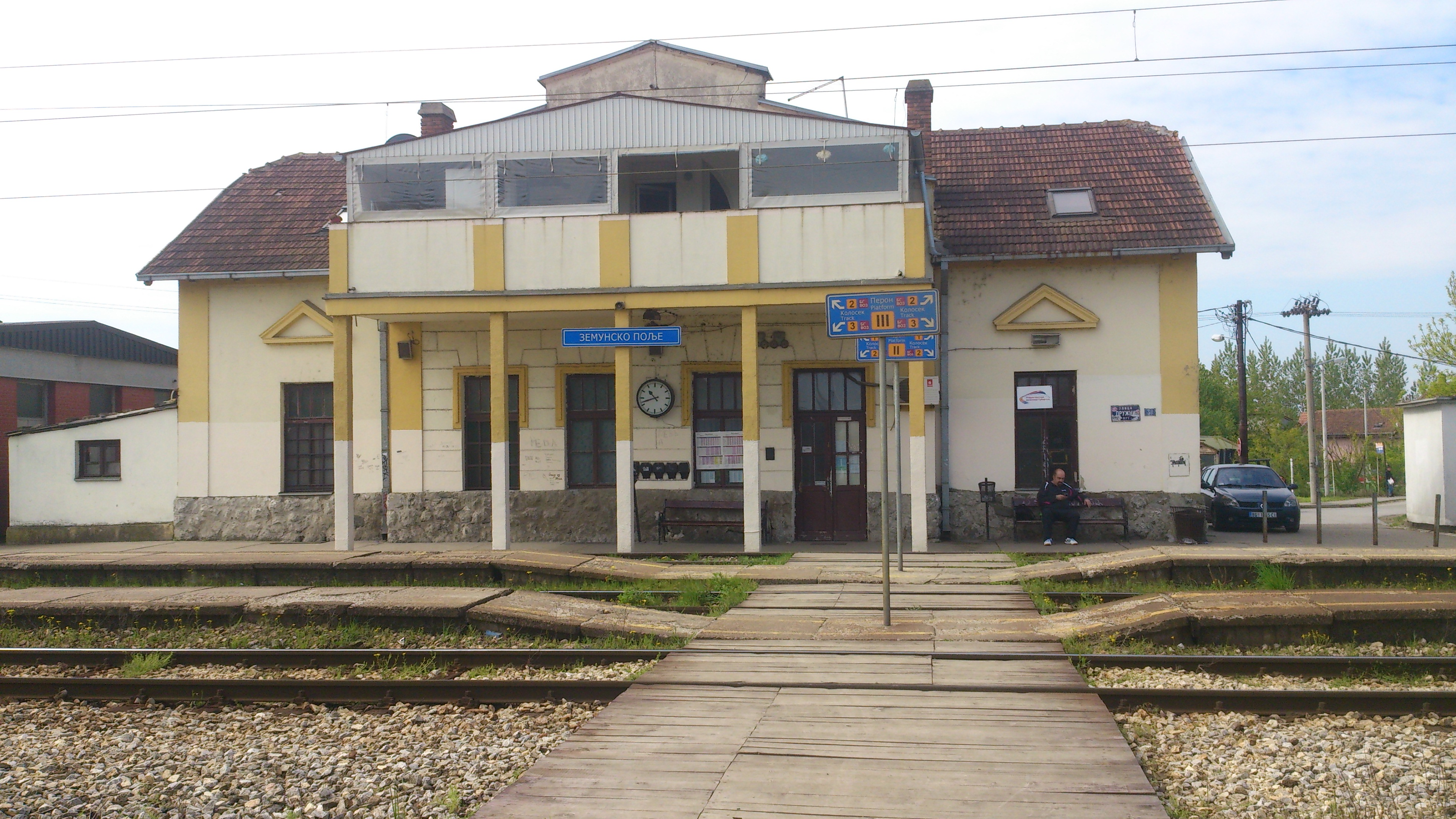
Zemun Polje railway station

Zemun Polje railway station (Serbian Cyrillic: Земун Поље, or Zemunsko Polje, Земунско Поље) is the rail station in Zemun, Serbia (administratively part of Belgrade). It is located in the settlement Zemun Polje in the municipality of Zemun. The railroad continues to Batajnica in one and to Zemun in the other direction. Zemun Polje railway station consists of 5 railway tracks.

Until October 1924, the official name of the station was Zemunski Obori, when it was renamed to Zemunsko Polje by the Ministry of Transportation.

== See also ==
- Serbian Railways
- Beovoz
- BG Voz
