= Nova Pazova =

Nova Pazova Нова Пазова (Serbian)
- Settlement
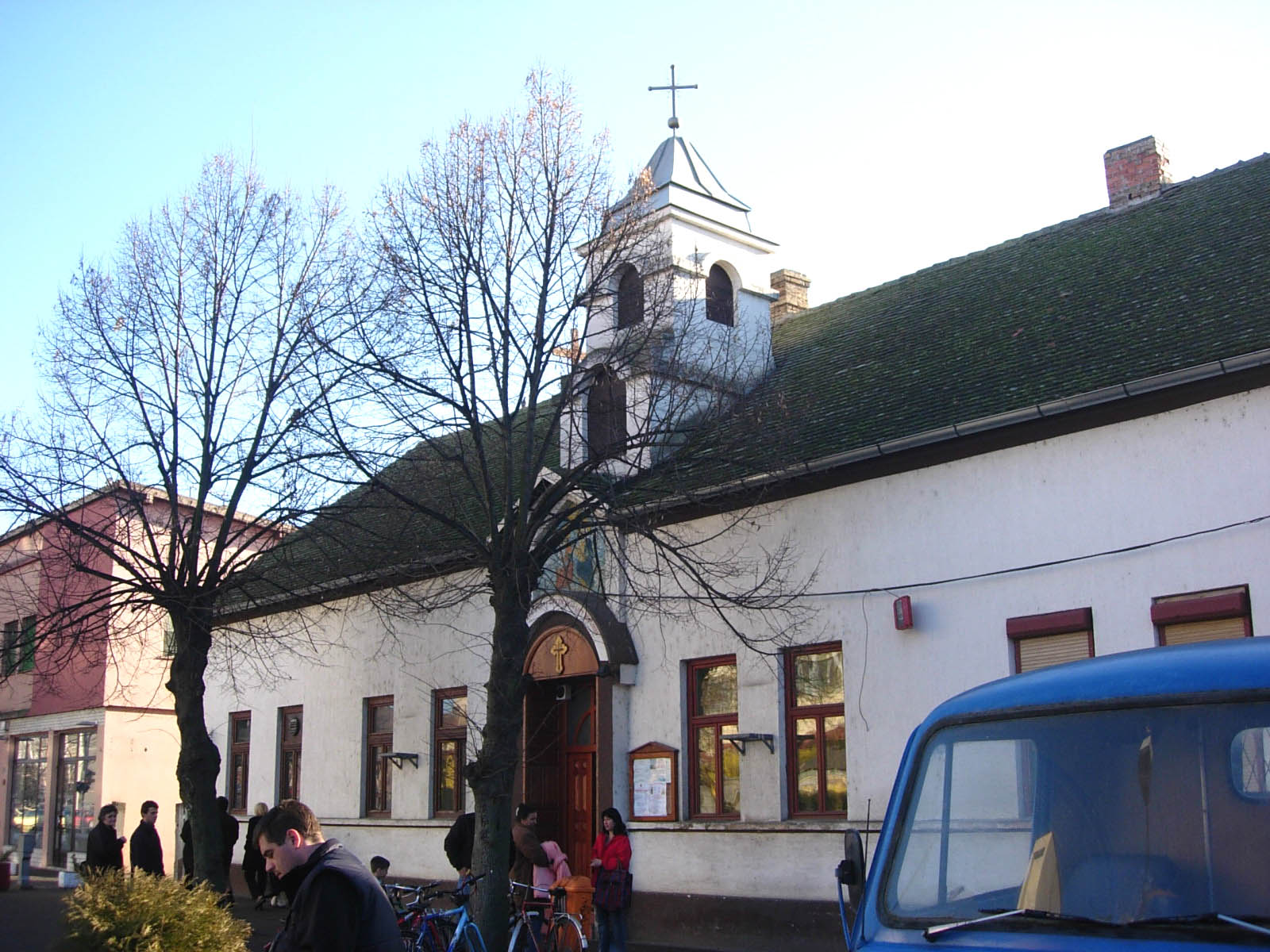
- The temporary Orthodox church.

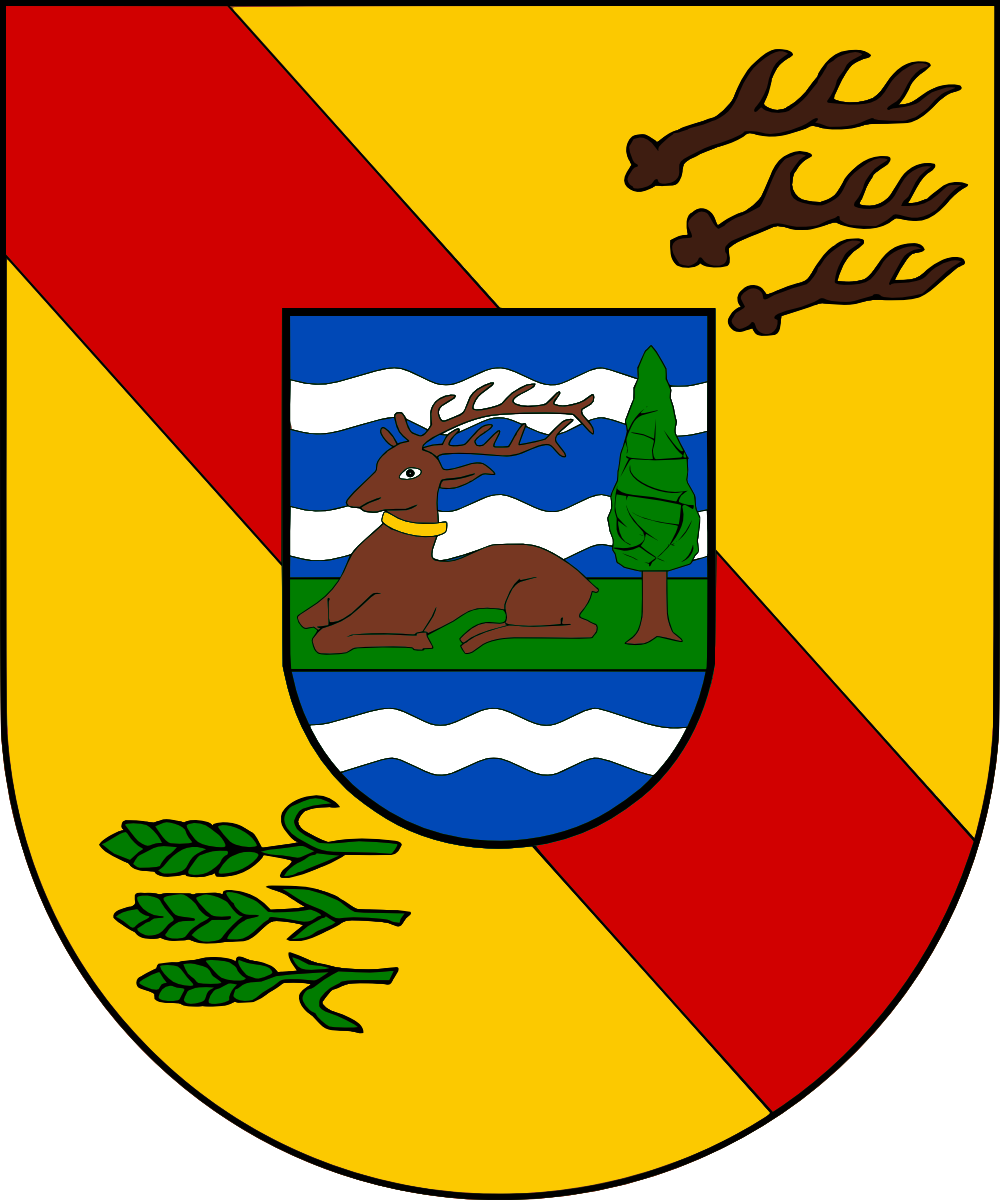
- Seal

- Location within Vojvodina Location within Serbia Location within Europe
- Coordinates: 44°57′N 20°13′E
- Country: Serbia
- Province: Vojvodina
- Region: Syrmia
- District: Srem
- Municipality: Stara Pazova

Area
  - Total: 26.09 km^{2} (10.07 sq mi)

Population (2022)
  - Total: 16,115
- Time zone: UTC+1 (CET)
  - Summer (DST): UTC+2 (CEST)

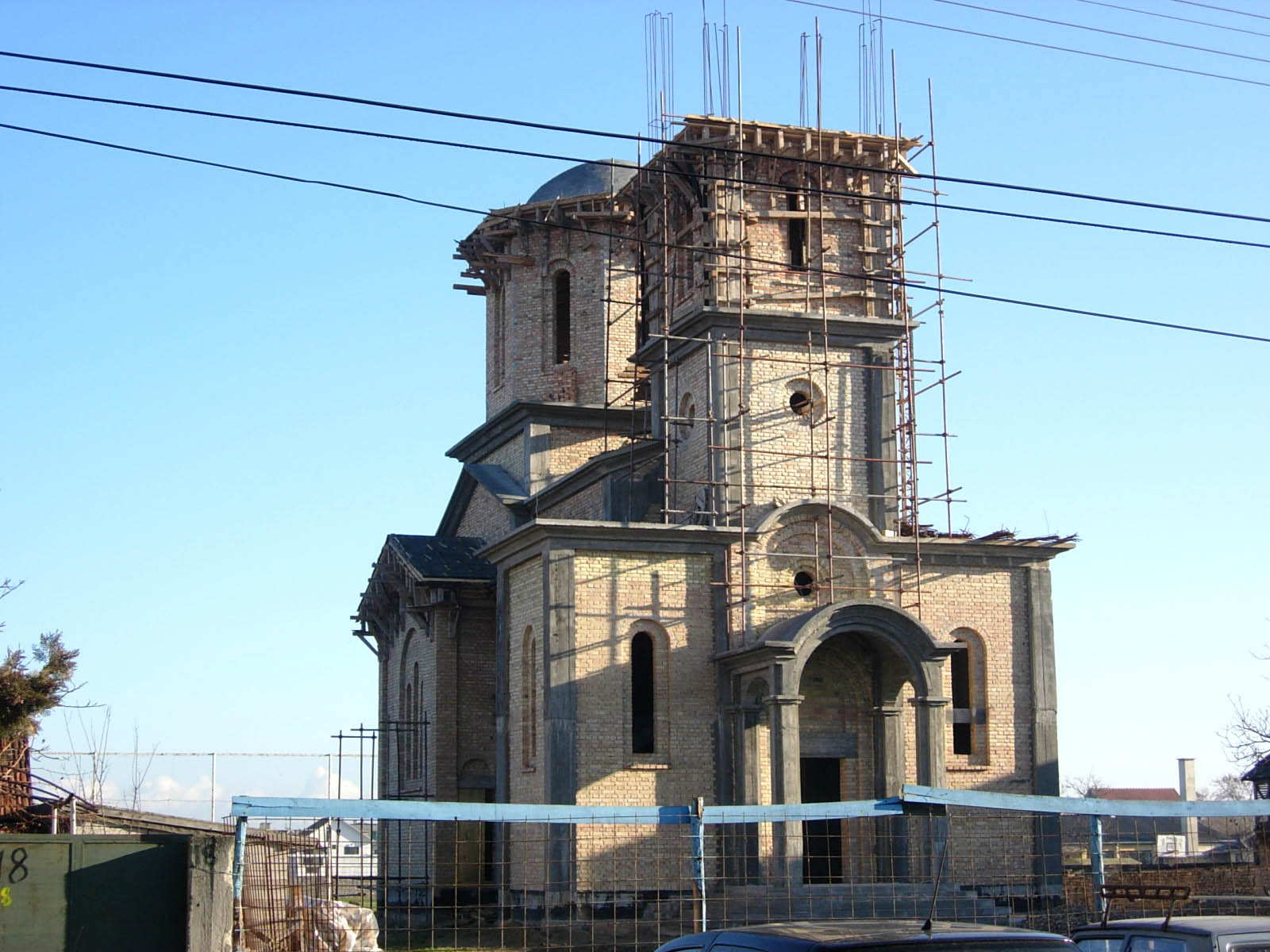
The new Orthodox church under construction.

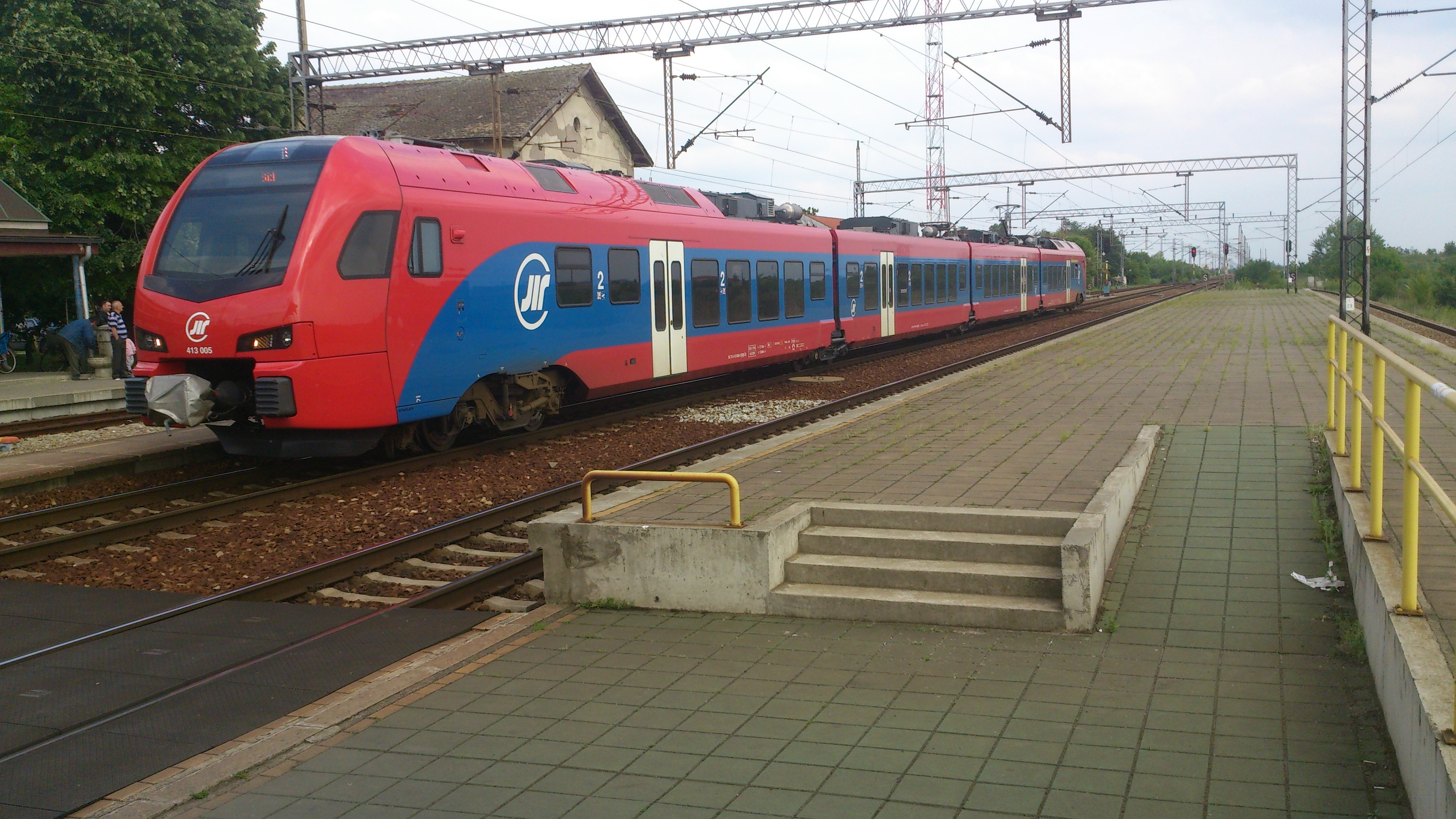
Train station.

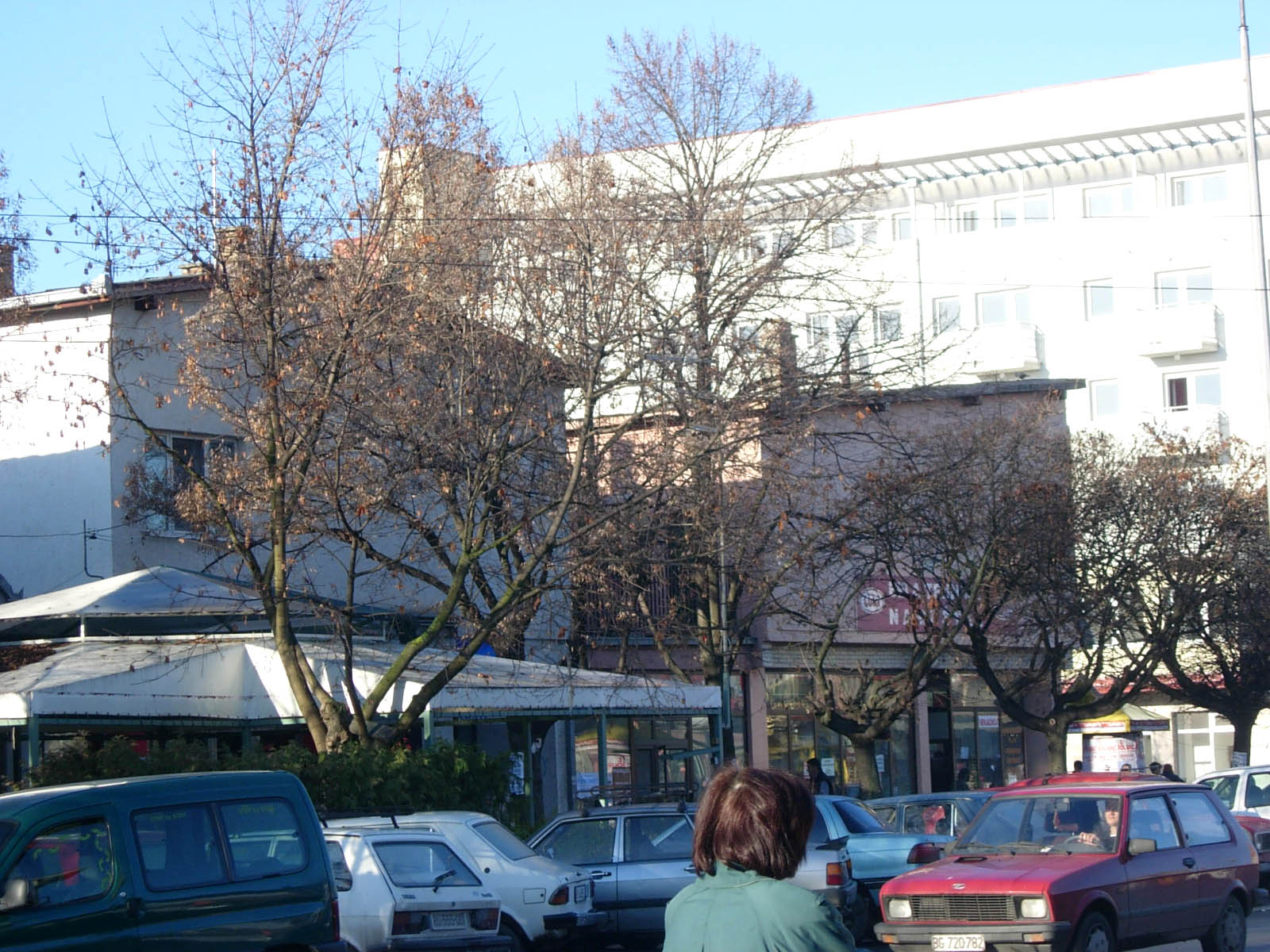
Building in the settlement.

Nova Pazova (Serbian Cyrillic: Нова Пазова, pronounced [nɔ̂ʋaː pâzɔʋa]) is a settlement in Serbia. It is situated in the Stara Pazova municipality, in the region of Srem (Srem District), in the Autonomous Province of Vojvodina. The settlement's population is currently 16,115 (2022 census).

== Name ==
In Serbian, the settlement is known as Nova Pazova (Нова Пазова), in German as Neu-Pasua, and in Hungarian as Újpazova.

== History ==
Nova Pazova was founded during Habsburg administration in 1791 in a marshy area and was populated by Evangelical Protestant German (Danube Swabian) settlers. The settlement grew from 51 initial settlers – including folk from Benningen, Marbach am Neckar, Schopfheim, Schorndorf, and Tübingen, in the Palatinate and Hesse, as well as Maglić in the Bačka.

Initially, the settlement was part of the Habsburg Military Frontier and the early German settlers had to serve in the Militärgrenze Wachdienst (military border watch guard) for the first few decades in the territory. In 1848-1849, the settlement was part of autonomous Serbian Vojvodina, but was again incorporated into the Military Frontier in 1849. After the abolishment of the Frontier, in 1882, the settlement was included into Syrmia County of Croatia-Slavonia, which was an autonomous kingdom within Habsburg Kingdom of Hungary and Austria-Hungary. According to 1910 census, majority of the settlement inhabitants spoke the German language.

In 1918, the settlement firstly became part of the State of Slovenes, Croats and Serbs, then part of the Kingdom of Serbia and finally part of the Kingdom of Serbs, Croats and Slovenes (later renamed to Yugoslavia). From 1918 to 1922, the settlement was part of the Syrmia County, from 1922 to 1929 part of the Syrmia Oblast, and from 1929 to 1941 part of the Danube Banovina.

From 1941 to 1944 the settlement was under Axis occupation and was attached to the Vuka County of the Independent State of Croatia. By 1944, there were over 6,000 residents, mostly Danube Swabian farmers and their Serb laborers. On 6 October 1944, the German-speaking inhabitants fled before the advancing Soviet army on a massive horse trek to Upper Austria.

Since 1944, the settlement was part of Yugoslav Vojvodina, which (from 1945) was part of new socialist Serbia within Yugoslavia. After the war (since 1945), the settlement was populated by new (mostly Serb) settlers, who originated from Bosnia and Herzegovina, Croatia and other parts of Serbia. Population censuses that were conducted after World War II recorded a Serb ethnic majority in Nova Pazova. From a population of 4,604 in 1948, the settlement was enlarged to 17,105 inhabitants in 2011.

== Historical population ==
- 1948: 4,604
- 1953: 6,082
- 1961: 10,990
- 1971: 10,658
- 1981: 15,488
- 1991: 16,016
- 2002: 18,214
- 2011: 17,105
- 2023: 15,731

== Sports ==
Local football club Radnički (Workers) spent one season in the second tier Serbian football.

== Notable residents ==
- Josias Kumpf (1925–2009), Nazi concentration camp guard

== See also ==
- Artistic Society Mladost Nova Pazova
- List of places in Serbia
- List of cities, towns and villages in Vojvodina
