= List of BG Voz stations =

BG Voz is a 27-station suburban rail system in Belgrade, Serbia. It was opened on January 1, 2010 as a 6.7-kilometer-long line between New Belgrade and Pančevo Bridge. It was subsequently extended to reach Batajnica in the northwest and Ovča in the northeast, covering a 31.3-kilometer-long stretch of track. Line 2 was opened on April 13, 2018 to extend the system to Resnik in the south of the city. Suburban lines to Mladenovac and Lazarevac in the very south of the administrative area were launched in 2019; however, the route to Mladenovac was halted in early 2026.

== Lines and stations ==
Ovča - Batajnica	31.3 km (19.4 mi)	15 stations (7 shared)
Ovča - Resnik	23.0 km (14.3 mi)	11 stations (11 shared)
Ovča - Lazarevac	68.0 km (42.3 mi)	19 stations (11 shared)

transfer to Srbijavoz

Station	Line(s)	Opened	Connections	Grade
Ovča	BG Voz Line 1 BG Voz Line 2 BG Voz Line 6	December 2016	105, 105L	at-grade
Sebeš	BG Voz Line 1 BG Voz Line 2 BG Voz Line 6	December 2016	Bus interchange	at-grade
Krnjača	BG Voz Line 1 BG Voz Line 2 BG Voz Line 6	December 2016	-	at-grade
Krnjača Bridge	BG Voz Line 1 BG Voz Line 2 BG Voz Line 6	December 2016	108	at-grade
Pančevo Bridge	BG Voz Line 1 BG Voz Line 2 BG Voz Line 6	September 2010	16, 23, 32E, 33, 35, 37, 43, 44, 48, 58, 95, 96	at-grade
Vukov Spomenik	BG Voz Line 1 BG Voz Line 2 BG Voz Line 6	September 2010	2, 5, 6, 7, 12, 14; 25, 25P, 26, 27, 32, 65, 66, 74, EKO1	underground
Karađorđe's Park	BG Voz Line 1 BG Voz Line 2 BG Voz Line 6	September 2010	9, 10, 14; 17, 18, 30, 31, 33, 36, 38L, 39, 42, 46, 47, 48, 55, 59, 70, 78, E9, suburban routes (Note: The nearby Autokomanda serves as a terminus of 15 suburban routes.)	underground
Belgrade Centre	(aux.) (future)	September 2010	40, 41; 34, 36, 38L	at-grade
New Belgrade	(aux.) (future)	September 2010	7L, 9L, 11, 13; 60, 60L, 67, 94, 95, EKO1, E1, E6	elevated
Tošin Bunar	(aux.) (future)	April 2011	45, 65, 70, 71, 72, 82, 601, 613	elevated
Zemun	(aux.) (future)	April 2011	45, 612, 709	at-grade
Altina	(future)	March 2022	81, 81L, 708, 709	at-grade
Zemun Polje	(future)	April 2011	708, 709	at-grade
Kamendin	BG Voz Line 1	March 2022	704, 707, 709	at-grade
Batajnica	BG Voz Line 1	April 2011	73, 700, 702, 703	at-grade
Rakovica	BG Voz Line 2 BG Voz Line 6	April 2018	3A, 42, 501, 502	at-grade
Kneževac	BG Voz Line 2 BG Voz Line 6	April 2018	3A, 37, 47, 54, 94, 501, 504, 507	at-grade
Kijevo	BG Voz Line 2 BG Voz Line 6	April 2018	47, 94, 501, 504	at-grade
Resnik	BG Voz Line 2 BG Voz Line 6	April 2018	47, 503, 504, 506, 507	at-grade
Bela Reka	BG Voz Line 6	December 2019	404, 407, 407L	at-grade
Barajevo	BG Voz Line 6	December 2019	405L	at-grade
Barajevo Centre	BG Voz Line 6	December 2019	suburban routes (Note: The nearby Barajevo Bus Station serves 26 suburban routes.)	at-grade
Veliki Borak	BG Voz Line 6	December 2019	5521, 5521A, 5528	at-grade
Leskovac Kolubarski	BG Voz Line 6	December 2019	133, 133L, 140	at-grade
Stepojevac	BG Voz Line 6	December 2019	-	at-grade
Vreoci	BG Voz Line 6	December 2019	116, 130, 130A, 133, 133L, 135, 140, 140L, 190C, 581, 581A, 583, 583A, 860BL, 860L, 946	at-grade
Lazarevac	BG Voz Line 6	December 2019	120	at-grade
