= List of Beovoz stations =

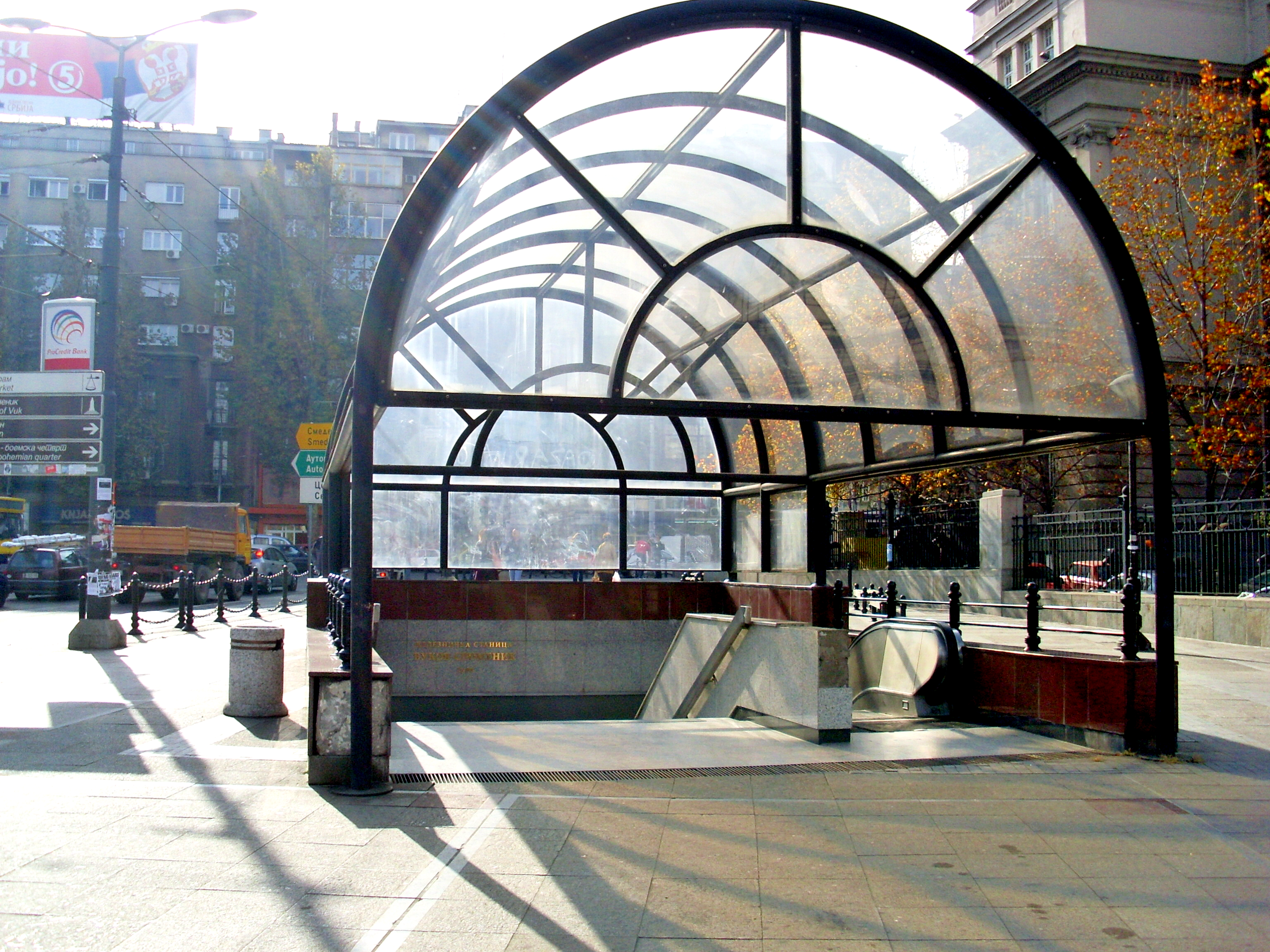
Underground station Vukov spomenik

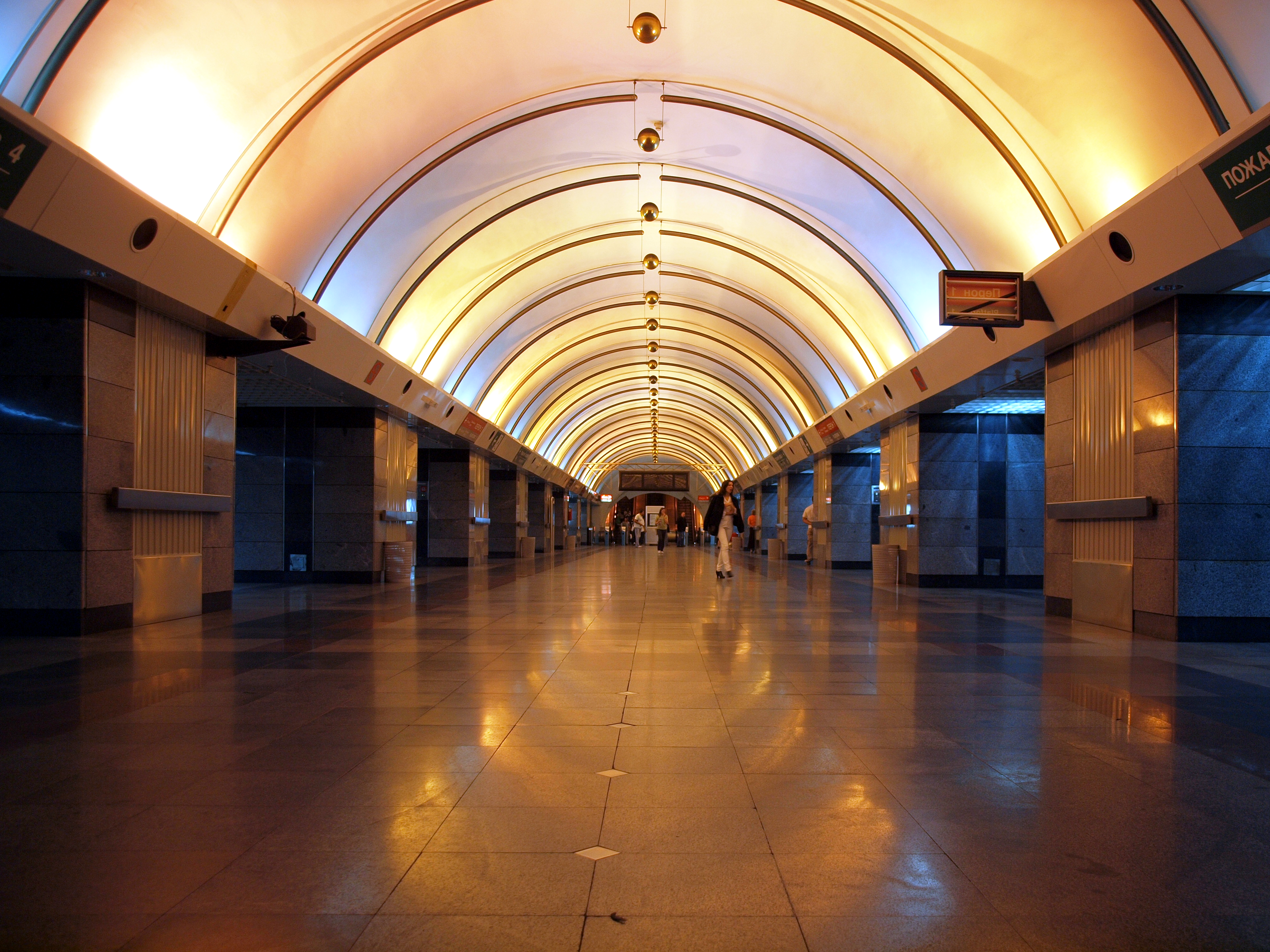
Underground station Vukov spomenik

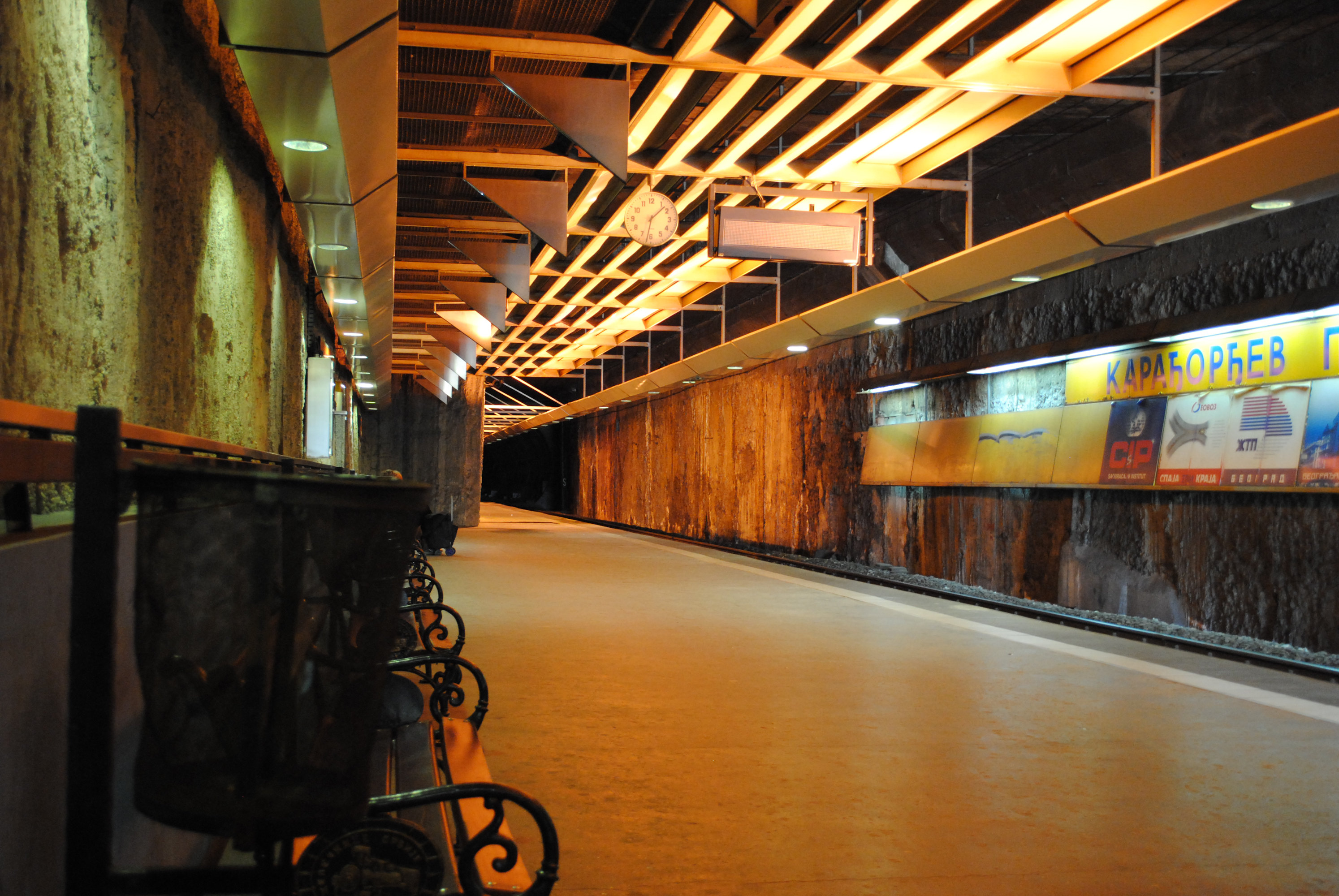
Underground station Karađorđev park

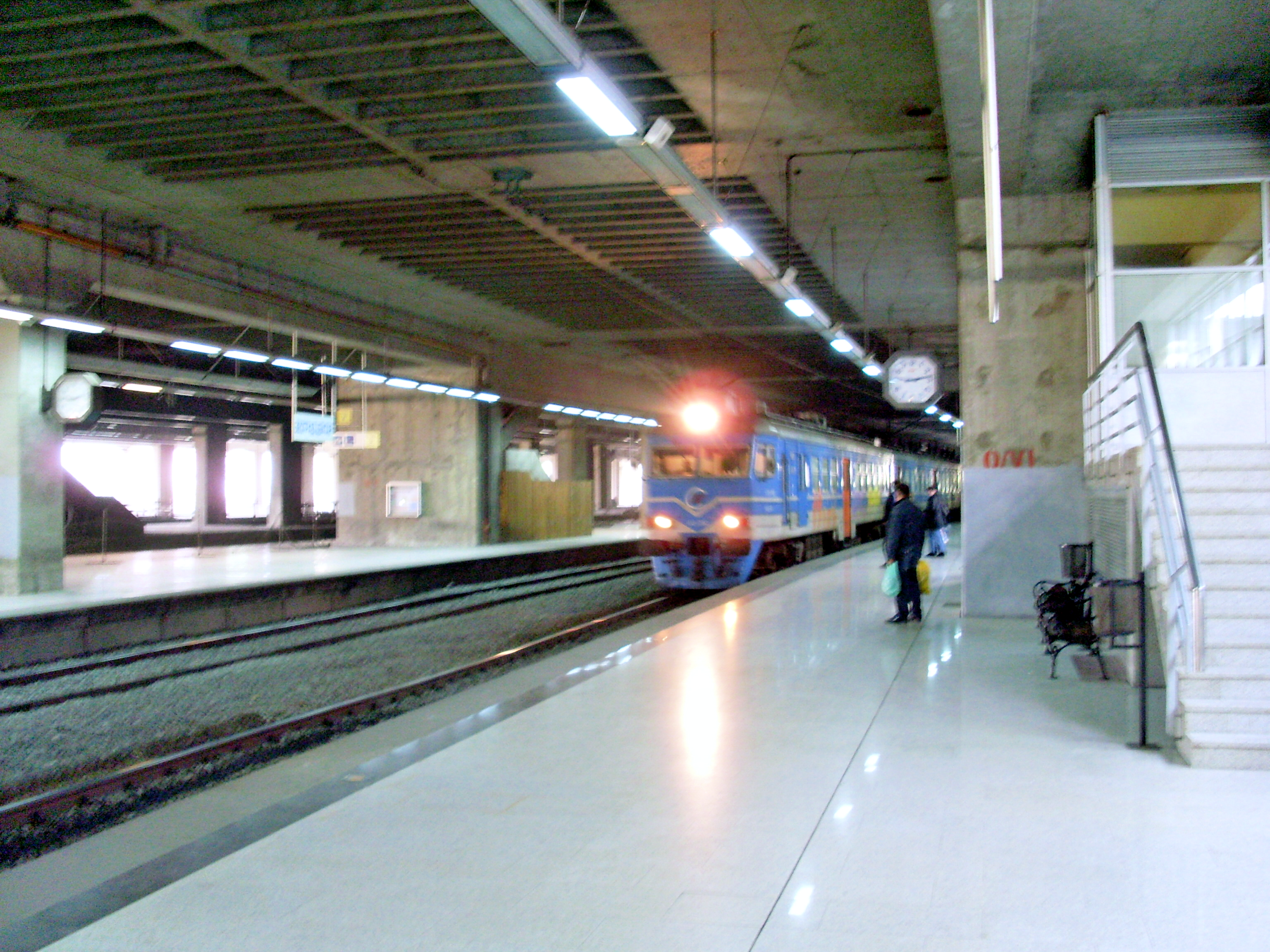
Station Beograd-Centar

There are six lines in Belgrade Beovoz City Railway System:

1. Stara Pazova-Batajnica-Beograd Centar-Pančevo Vojlovica
2. Ripanj-Resnik-Rakovica-Pančevo Vojlovica
3. Stara Pazova-Batajnica-Beograd Centar-Rakovica-Resnik-Ripanj
4. Zemun-Beograd Centar-Rakovica-Valjevo
5. Nova Pazova-Batajnica-Beograd Centar-Rakovica-Resnik-Mladenovac
6. Stara Pazova-Batajnica-Beograd Centar-Rakovica-Mala Krsna

List of stations (Note that two lines can have same stations in some parts):

Line 1:

- Stara Pazova
- Nova Pazova
- Batajnica
- Zemunsko Polje
- Zemun
- Tošin Bunar
- Novi Beograd
- Beograd Centar
- Karađorđev park (underground)
- Vukov spomenik (underground)
- Pančevački most
- Krnjača
- Sebeš
- Ovča
- Pančevo Glavna
- Pančevo Varoš
- Pančevo Strelište
- Pančevo Vojlovica

Line 2:

- Ripanj
- Ripanj Kolonija
- Pinosava
- Resnik
- Kijevo
- Kneževac
- Rakovica
- Karađorđev park (underground)
- Vukov spomenik (underground)
- Pančevački most
- Krnjača
- Sebeš
- Ovča
- Pančevo Glavna
- Pančevo Varoš
- Pančevo Strelište
- Pančevo Vojlovica

Line 3:

- Stara Pazova
- Nova Pazova
- Batajnica
- Zemunsko Polje
- Zemun
- Tošin Bunar
- Novi Beograd
- Beograd Centar
- Rakovica
- Kneževac
- Kijevo
- Resnik
- Pinosava
- Ripanj Kolonija
- Ripanj

Line 4 (Zemun branch):

- Zemun
- Tošin Bunar
- Novi Beograd
- Beograd Centar
- merge with Pančevo branch at Rakovica

Line 4 (Pančevo branch):

- Pančevo Glavna
- Pančevo Varoš
- Ovča
- Sebeš
- Krnjača
- Pančevački most
- Vukov Spomenik (underground)
- Karađorđev park (underground)
- Rakovica
- Kneževac
- Kijevo
- Resnik
- Bela Reka
- Nenadovac
- Barajevo
- Barajevo Centar
- Veliki Borak
- Leskovac Kolubarski
- Stepojevac
- Vreoci
- Lazarevac
- Lajkovac
- Slovac
- Mlađevo
- Divci
- Lukavac Kolubarski
- Iverak
- Valjevo

Line 5:

- Nova Pazova
- Batajnica
- Zemunsko Polje
- Zemun
- Tošin Bunar
- Novi Beograd
- Beograd Centar
- Rakovica
- Kneževac
- Kijevo
- Resnik
- Pinosava
- Ripanj Kolonija
- Ripanj
- Klenje
- Ripanj Tunel
- Ralja
- Sopot Kosmajski
- Vlaško Polje
- Mladenovac

Line 6:

- Stara Pazova
- Nova Pazova
- Batajnica
- Zemunsko Polje
- Zemun
- Tošin Bunar
- Novi Beograd
- Beograd Centar
- Rakovica
- Jajinci
- Beli Potok
- Zuce Stajalište
- Zuce
- Vrčin
- Kasapovac
- Lipe
- Mala Ivanča
- Brestovi
- Mali Požarevac
- Dražanj–Šepšin
- Umčari
- Živkovac
- Vodanj
- Kolari
- Ralja Smederevska
- Mala Krsna

== See also ==
- Beovoz
- Belgrade Metro
