= Vukov Spomenik =

Vukov Spomenik Вуков Споменик
- Urban neighbourhood
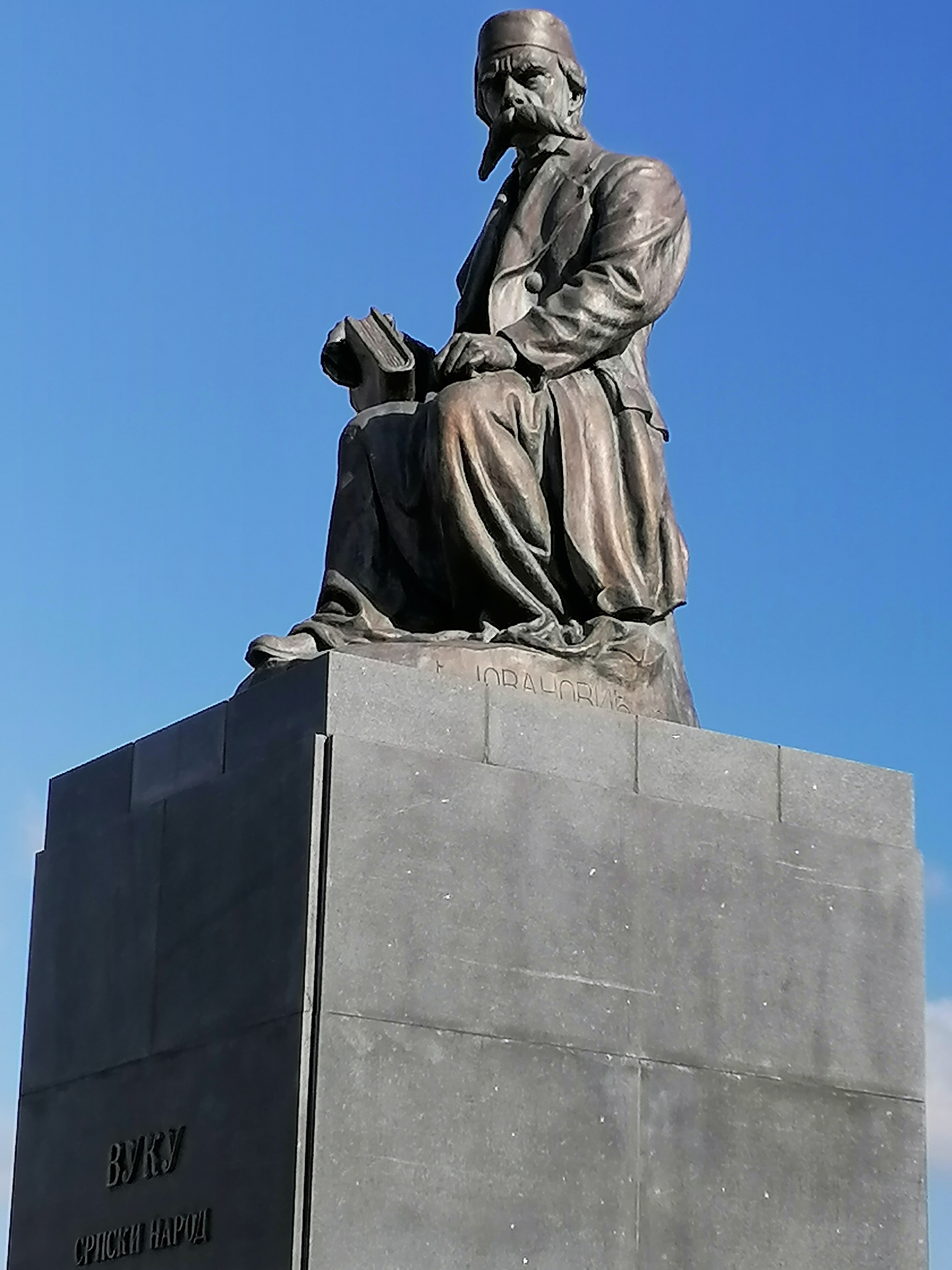
- The Vuk monument
- Interactive map of Vukov Spomenik
- Location within Belgrade
- Coordinates: 44°48′11″N 20°29′08″E
- Country: Serbia
- Region: Belgrade
- Municipality: Zvezdara/Palilula/Vračar

Area
  - Total: 0.39 km^{2} (0.15 sq mi)
- Time zone: UTC+1 (CET)
  - Summer (DST): UTC+2 (CEST)
- Area code: +381(0)11
- Car plates: BG

Vukov Spomenik or colloquially Vuk (Serbian Cyrillic: Вуков Споменик; English: The Vuk Monument) is an urban neighborhood of Belgrade, the capital of Serbia. It is located on the tripoint of Belgrade's municipalities of Zvezdara, Palilula and Vračar, and served by the underground Vukov Spomenik railway station.

== Location ==
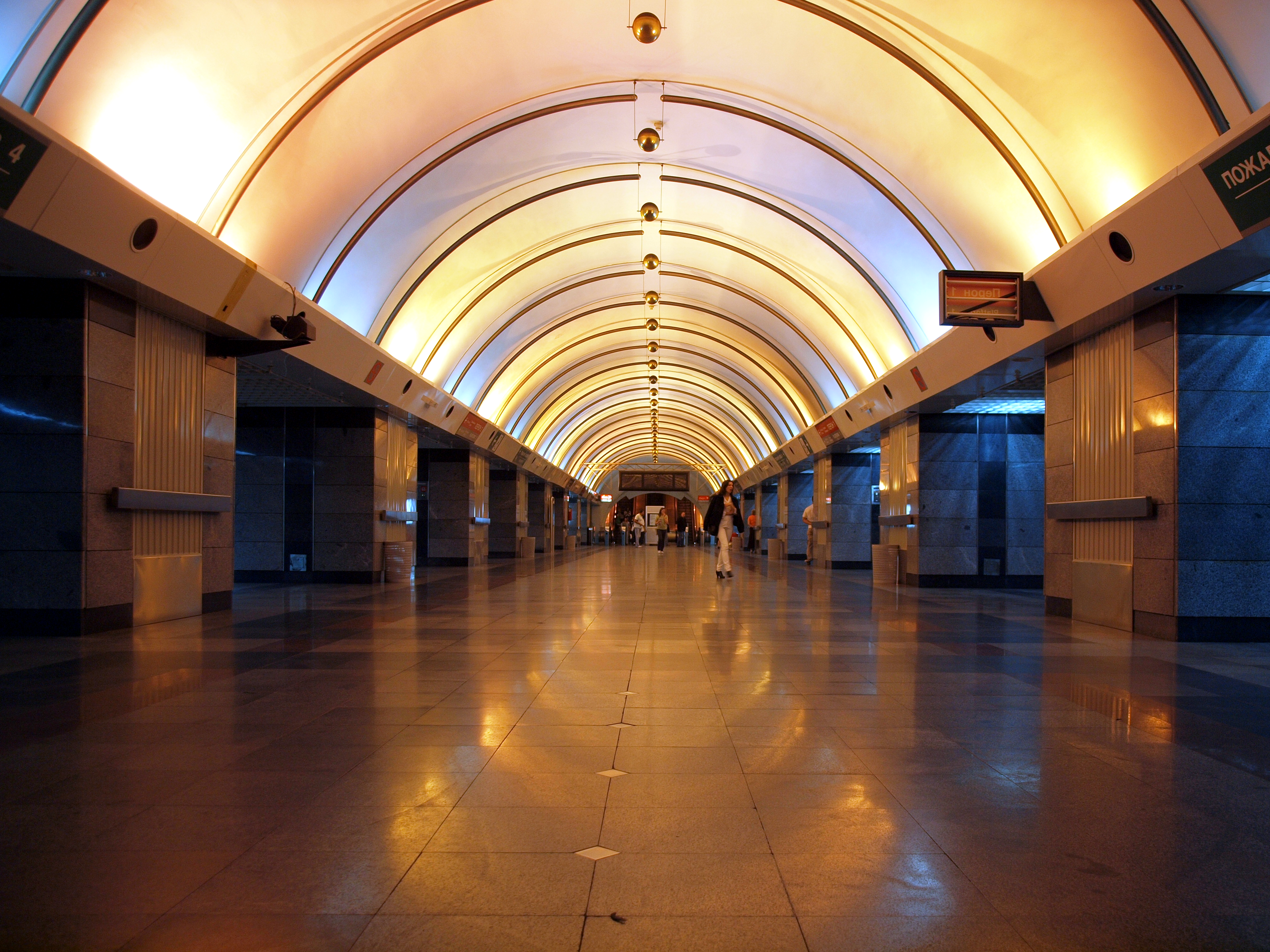
Underground station Vukov spomenik

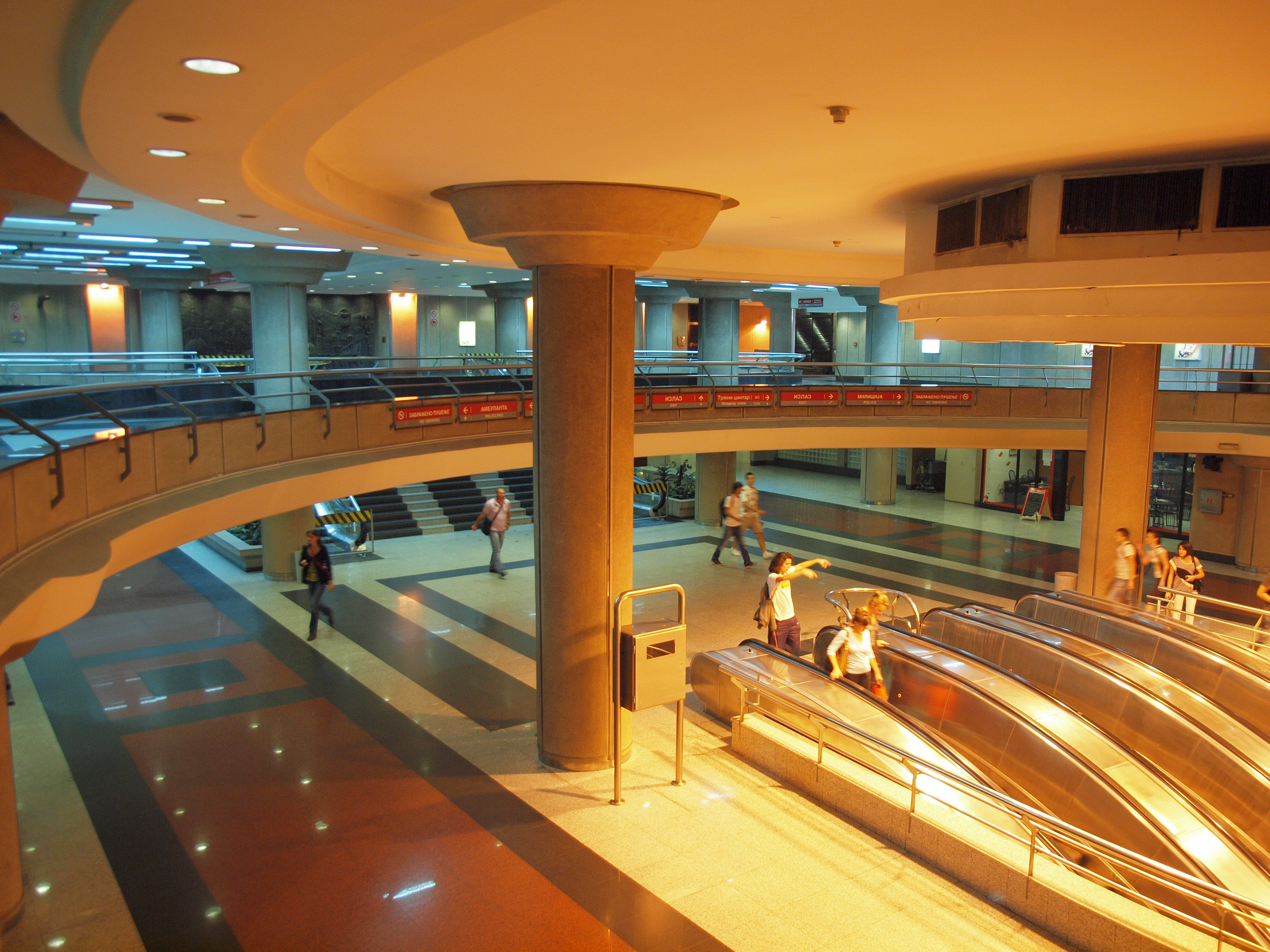
Escalators at Vukov Spomenik station

Vukov Spomenik is located on the crossroad of the Bulevar kralja Aleksandra and Ruzveltova street, in the valley between the north-eastern slopes of the Vračar and western slopes of the Zvezdara hills. It borders the neighborhoods of Tašmajdan on the west and Palulula and Hadžipopovac on the north (in Palilula municipality), Slavujev Venac on the north-east and Đeram on the north (in Zvezdara municipality) and Krunski Venac and Kalenić in the south.

== History ==
Below the modern monument and railway station, there is an underground water well, sort of a "twin" of the better known Roman Well in the Belgrade Fortress. The well was built on the same principle and being about the same depth as its fortress counterpart, which is not "Roman" but was actually built by the Austrians in the first half of the 18th century.

The area of the future Vukov Spomenik was the location of the first Serbian hippodrome. The Belgrade Hippodrome was moved to the neighborhood of Marinkova Bara in the 1890s. Area of the former race tracks was turned into the park in 1907. It developed into the modern Park Ćirilo i Metodije in 1928, projected by Sava Nikolić. The park was named after one of the first Slavic enlighteners, Cyril and Methodius. The park was renovated in May 2017 when seedlings of horse-chestnut, red horse-chestnut and the weeping birch were planted. In 2010, the park covered 1.64 hectares (4.1 acres).

The area formed an eastern outskirts of Belgrade until the 1930s. A football field was set in the area and the oldest campus in Serbia was built here, too, in 1928. A donor of the campus was king Alexander I of Yugoslavia, so the campus was named "King Alexander the First". Prior to World War II, the campus was used as a seat of the Grand Lodge of Yugoslavia's Freemasons. At the time, the neighborhood was known as Kamenović, after the kafana of the same name, which was located in the boulevard between Molerova and Stiška (today Golsvordijeva) streets.

On 7 November 1937, on the corner of the Bulevar kralja Aleksandra and Ruzveltova street, a monument to Vuk Karadžić (by sculptor Đorđe Jovanović), a major reformer of Serbian language, celebrating 150 years of his birth, was erected. It was declared a cultural monument in 1965. The original intended location for the monument was the Academic Park in 1932, in front of the Belgrade University's Rectorate Building. The park already hosted the monument to the other major cultural reformer Dositej Obradović. However, the monument to Vuk Karadžić was deemed too big for this location, so the current location was chosen. New location, and the fact that the monument is on the edge of the park, facing the street, made the sculptor Jovanović very upset with the city administration.

Unsatisfied with the location at city's periphery, Jovanović refused to participate in all festivities regarding dedication of the monument. He was present at the liturgy in Alexander Nevsky Church, but was absent from the unveiling at the location, and a ceremonial gathering at the Ilija M. Kolarac Endowment. Still, after the monument, the entire neighborhood got its modern name (Vukov spomenik is Serbian for Vuk's monument), and former name, Kamenović, went out of use soon after World War II. The entire neighborhood developed into an academic area, as University Library, Archives of Serbia and Technical faculties are located here.

The technical faculties complex, which covers 59,000 square metres (640,000 sq ft), was mostly built from 1932 to 1955. In September 2021, the government announced construction of the new building, with 22,000 square metres (240,000 sq ft) and 7,000 square metres (75,000 sq ft) of garage space, which will connect all existing buildings and provide new, additional space. The urban overhaul of the entire complex was also announced. The design was selected in April 2022. The inner yard within the complex will be transformed into the mixed communal and students area, with garages, structural connections between the old buildings and construction of two new glass, 5-storey buildings. Everything will be covered with a green roof, which would descend to the Ruzveltova Street, right across the Vuk's monument. This will be the main entrance into the interior of the complex, with the roof providing the green connection between the Tašmajdan Park and the Park of Cyril and Methodius.

In August 2022, a 9.3 million dinars (€79,000) heavy reconstruction of the monument itself was announced. Works began on 7 November 2022, on the monuments 85th birthday. The statue and the entire memorial complex were in bad shape, aggravated by the hasty works in 1995, when the hurried construction of the underground railway station was in progress. The bronze statue wasn't treated properly, while the low-quality stone was used for paving the pedestal and the surrounding stairs and plateau. Works, which include temporary removal of the statue and the new price of 11 million dinars (€93,000), will be finished in March 2023.

== Characteristics ==
Historical population
| Year | Pop. | ±% |
|---|---|---|
| 1981 | 6,867 | — |
| 1991 | 11,248 | +63.8% |
| 2002 | 11,379 | +1.2% |
| 2011 | 9,579 | −15.8% |

Apart from its academic function, Vukov Spomenik is one of the busiest traffic spots in Belgrade, being on or near the crossroads of some of the most frequently used transportation routes (Bulevar kralja Aleksandra, Ruzveltova, Kraljice Marije, Cvjićeva streets). Additionailly, "Vukov Spomenik" is also one of the underground train stations of the future Belgrade Metro, which for now operates as part of the Belgrade-Pančevo railway (local Beovoz rail, connecting Nova Pazova (in province of Vojvodina), Belgrade and Pančevo (in Vojvodina again).

One of the landmarks in the neighborhood is the "King Alexander I Student residence". The three-storey building was constructed in 1927 and designed by the Russian white émigré architect Đorđe Kovaljevski. Massive, white building at 75 Bulevar Kralja Aleksandra, is designed in the Academic Empire style. The edifice is too pompous for the students' dormitory. Risalit is ornamented with four columns and two pilasters, all with Ionic capitals. Ornamented garlands divide the façade and architrave beam is cut in order to enhance the Empire style gable. The top arch is bordered with reliefs and marked by two antique amphoras which "guard" the arch. Sides are less decorated, but the ornaments are massive. Back façade faces the park and is lightened with the restaurant's terrace. In terms of architecture, the building is designed outside of the vogue of the day, appears "too heavy" and shows weaknesses of the Russian architectural schools ("fear of winter", like narrow windows, etc.). The building was declared a cultural monument.

Administratively, Vukov Spomenik is a local community (mesna zajednica, sub-municipal administrative unit) in its Zvezdara section, with a population of 9,529 by the 2011 census. Since the 1980s it includes the local community of Stari Đeram. Additionally, it is a main administrative center of the municipality of Zvezdara as a whole, as the Municipal assembly of Zvezdara is located here.

For decades, the neighborhood is known for the Vukovci. They are physical, manual and construction day laborers, who gather at the park, along the Bulevar Kralja Aleksandra, at least since the 1960s. Some even sleep on the benches in the park. They wait for the contractors who come to pick workers they need for that day. This black labor market is in Serbia colloquially styled the "street labor market". The workers originate not just from Belgrade, but from the entire Serbia, mostly southern and Kosovo, and Bosnia and Herzegovina. They are on average older, former workers from the failed factories, but some are well educated. In the 1970s, when Belgrade was growing exponentially, there were up to 400 workers daily, but by the 2020 there were no more than 20-30. They share their nickname, Vukovci, with the A grade elementary pupils, who are given the "Vuk Diploma", also named after Vuk Karadžić. This is a frequent source of misnomer jokes.
