= BG Voz =

Belgrade suburban rail network

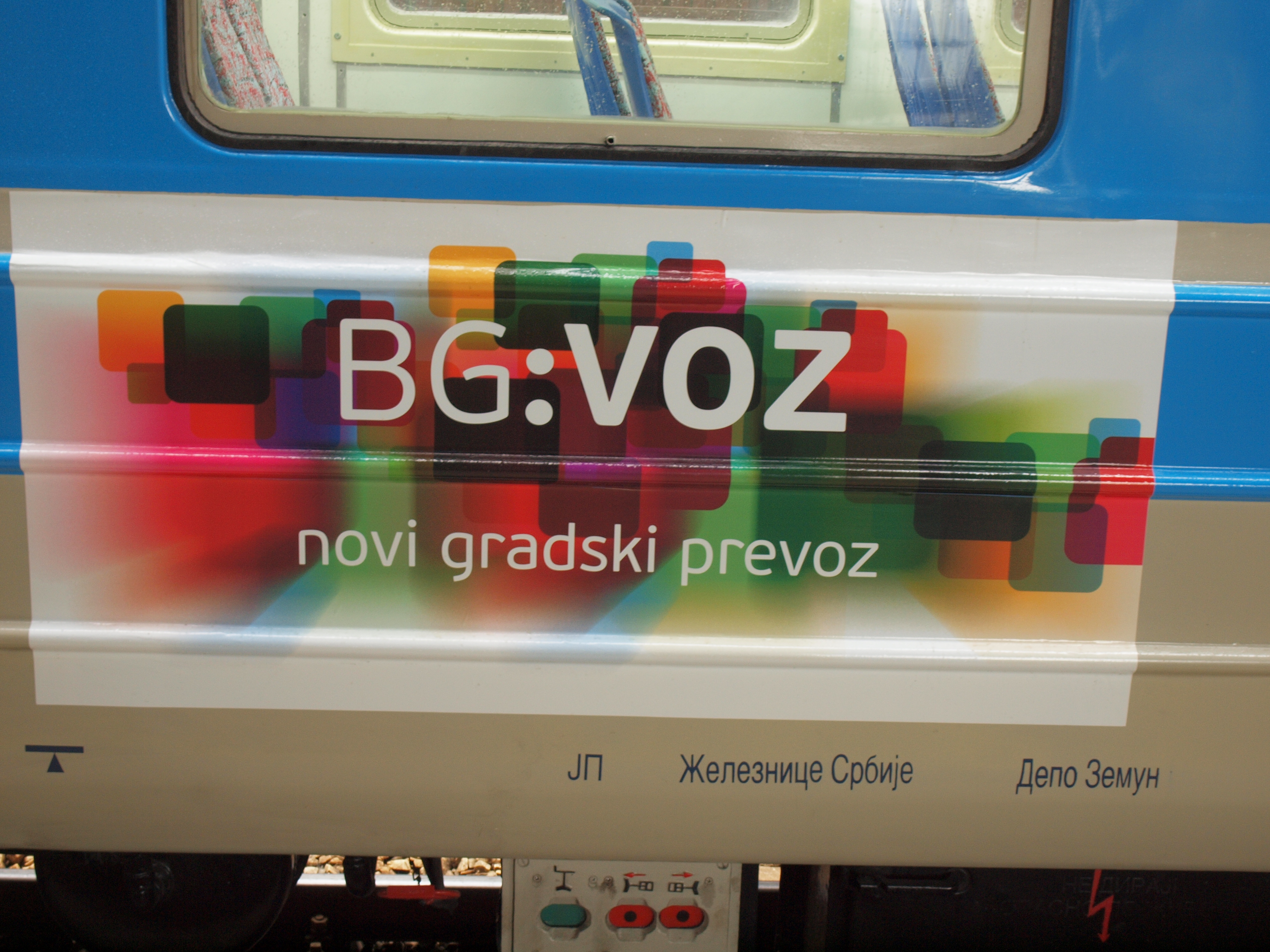
- Train logo

Overview
- Native name: Serbian Cyrillic: БГ Воз
- Area served: Belgrade
- Transit type: Commuter rail
- Line number: 3
- Number of stations: 27
- Daily ridership: ~20,000
- Website: https://beovoz.rs/

Operation
- Began operation: September 1, 2010; 16 years ago
- Operator: JKP Beogradski metro i voz
- Rolling stock: ŽS series 412
- Train length: four cars

Technical
- System length: 184 km (114 mi) in 2022
- Track gauge: 1,435 mm (4 ft 8 1/2 in)
System map
Key

BG Voz (Serbian Cyrillic: БГ Воз; stylized as BG:VOZ) is a suburban rail system that serves the city of Belgrade, Serbia. Operated by the "Beogradski metro i voz" (Note: Belgrade metro and train) public utility company, the system connects the central parts of Belgrade to its distant suburbs. Urban trains carry passengers between the termini of Ovča, Batajnica and Resnik, while suburban ones reach towards Lazarevac in the south.

The system serves 27 stations across three primary lines supplemented by auxiliary routes. BG Voz is linked to the city's ground transport: in addition to buses, three stations - Karađorđe's Park, Vukov Spomenik and New Belgrade - are served by trams, while Belgrade Center is served by trolleybuses.

Used by some 20,000 passengers every day, BG Voz has been described as the fastest transportation mode in Belgrade, but also the least maintained. Common issues include the trains' age, irregular departures, overcrowding and poor hygienic conditions. Plans exist both to introduce new trains and construct additional lines, which are aimed to connect Makiš to Karaburma and Zemun Polje to the future National Stadium.

== History ==
BG Voz was preceded by Beovoz, an older commuter rail system opened in 1992. At its peak in 2002, Beovoz reached Pančevo, Inđija, Valjevo, Velika Plana, Požarevac as well as Belgrade's southern suburbs. The two systems coexisted as BG Voz's Line 1 was opened in 2010, with Beovoz being gradually phased out by BG Voz's expansion. Beovoz was eventually cut to only reach Pančevo and then closed down in December 2017.

== Lines ==
- Ovča - Batajnica or Line 1, is the oldest line of the system: first trains departed in September 2010 and connected five stations, with the termini being Pančevo Bridge and New Belgrade. It was expanded on 15 April 2011 to reach Batajnica and then in December 2016 to connect to Ovča. Two more infill stations - Altina and Kamendin - were opened in March 2022. It is marked with brown in official schedules.
- Ovča - Resnik or Line 2, is the shorter and newer of the two urban lines, being launched in April 2018. It initially connected five stations - Resnik, Kijevo, Kneževac, Rakovica and Belgrade Center, before being extended to Ovča later that year. Today, it runs through Karađorđe's Park instead, bypassing Belgrade Centre. It is marked with blue in official schedules.
  - Beograd Centar - Resnik is a short variation of Line 2, served by two round daily trips. It is also marked with blue.
  - Zemun - Resnik, another auxiliary route, also used to exist, running via Beograd Centar. It was marked with pink as of 2025 and denoted with 100F among urban transit lines.
- Ovča - Mladenovac or Line 5, previously known as Line 3, was launched in September 2019, reaching towards Mladenovac. Prior to its cancelation, it was the least-busy line of the system, with three daily round trips. Service was temporarily halted in February 2026. It was marked with light blue.
  - Zemun - Mladenovac was a variation of the route. Like the primary Line 5, it was halted in early 2026.
- Ovča - Lazarevac or Line 6, previously known as Line 4, was launched in December 2019 as the second suburban line and the fourth overall. It reaches towards southern towns of Barajevo and Lazarevac via Resnik. As of 2026, it is marked with blue in official schedules as an auxiliary route of Line 2; previously, it was marked with purple.
  - Zemun - Lazarevac is a variation of the line, running via Beograd Centar. It has three daily Zemun-bound and two daily Lazarevac-bound trips.

Two more lines are planned for future service as of August 2026:

- Makiš - Karaburma or Line 3 is planned to run via abandoned tunnels near Karaburma, as well as the Κneževac Tunnel between the Makiš Field and Rakovica. It is intended to link to the future Line 1 of the Belgrade Metro via a new terminus at Karaburma. To the south, a new station at Makiš is planned adjacent to the future metro depot.
- Belgrade Center - Expo or Line 4 is planned to connect the city to Belgrade Nikola Tesla Airport and the National Stadium being built for Expo 2027. Construction was started in June 2025 and is expected to be complete in December 2026. It is expected to serve four new stations - Singidunum, Belgrade Airport, Surčin and National Stadium - along an 18-kilometer-long rail link.

BG Voz lines
Line		Termini		Stations	Opened	Daily trips	
100	Line 1	Ovča	Batajnica	15	2010	23	27 (Note: Some trains terminate at Zemun)
100P	Line 2	Ovča	Resnik	11	2018	17 (Note: Excluding Lazarevac-bound trains, as well as variations)	17
-	Line 3	Makiš	Karaburma	TBD	TBD	TBD	
-	Line 4	Belgrade Centre	Expo	10	2026	TBD	
100D	Line 5	Ovča	Mladenovac	19	2019 / TBD	TBD	
100C	Line 6	Ovča	Lazarevac	19	2019	5	5

== Infrastructure ==
=== Stations ===
Lines 1, 2 & 6 serve seven stations in parallel: Ovča, Sebeš, Krnjača, Krnjača Bridge, Pančevo Bridge, Vukov Spomenik and Karađorđe's Park. From there, they split: Line 1 serves Belgrade Centre, New Belgrade, Tošin Bunar and Zemun, Altina, Zemun Polje and Kamendin before terminating at Batajnica.. In contrast, Lines 2 & 6 run south via Rakovica, Kneževac and Kijevo, before Line 2 terminates at Resnik. Auxiliary routes run between Belgrade Centre, Resnik and Zemun.

From Resnik, trains split into two segments. The western route is the only one active; it runs along Bela Reka, Barajevo, Barajevo Center, Veliki Borak, Leskovac Kolubarski, Stepojevac, Vreoci and Lazarevac to form Line 6. The inactive eastern part made up a segment of Line 5; it served Ripanj Kolonija, Ripanj, Klenje, Ripanj Tunnel, Ralja, Sopot Kosmajski, Vlaško Polje and Mladenovac.

The majority of stations are at-grade (ex. Ovča): however, New Belgrade and Tošin Bunar are elevated. Similarly, there are only two underground stations, both in the central part of Belgrade: Karađorđe's Park and Vukov Spomenik. They are linked to each other and the following stations by the Vračar and Dedinje Tunnels passing under the city. Other tunnels include the Senjak Tunnel passing under the Vojvode Putnika Boulevard and the two-kilometer-long Bežanija Tunnel running under the Arsenija Čarnojevića Boulevard.

=== Service ===
Formally, trains operate on fixed timetables that may be displayed at stations; some stations are additionally equipped with electronic screens. However, access to service information is inadequate and delays, as well as cancellations, are common. During peak intervals at weekdays, Lines 1 & 2 run every 30 minutes or better, with larger headways and fewer departures at other times, as well as during weekends and public holidays. In contrast, Line 6 sees the largest intervals; with just few daily trips, headways as long as several hours are common.

Much like almost all (Note: E2, E6, E9 and A1 minibus lines are paid.) transit in Belgrade, BG Voz has been free to use since 2025. However, the Serbian Railways services it shares track with are not. Overall, BG Voz links to national railways on most of its stations, including key stations of Belgrade Centre, Karađorđe's Park and Vukov Spomenik. Additionally, it links to Panvoz, a Belgrade - Pančevo rail line.

=== Rolling stock ===
As of 2023, the system is served by twelve aging ŽS series 412 electric multiple units. Produced in Riga, Latvia in the 1980s and the 1990s, the trains are of distinct blue color and frequently defaced with graffiti.

BG Voz fleet
Model	Image	Manufacturer	Years produced	Number in fleet
ŽS Series 412/416		RVR	1980 - 1996	12

== Accidents ==
- On May 17, 2024, 13 people were injured when train 7112 operating between Lazarevac and Ovča hit the freight train standing at the Pančevački most railway station waiting for departure clearance. The accident happened at 6:26 p.m. in Vračar tunnel, between railway stations Vukov spomenik and Pančevački most, approximately 400 meters from the entrance next to the Pančevački most railway station.
