= Mladenovac railway station =

Railway station in Serbia

Coordinates: 44°26′25″N 20°41′29″E

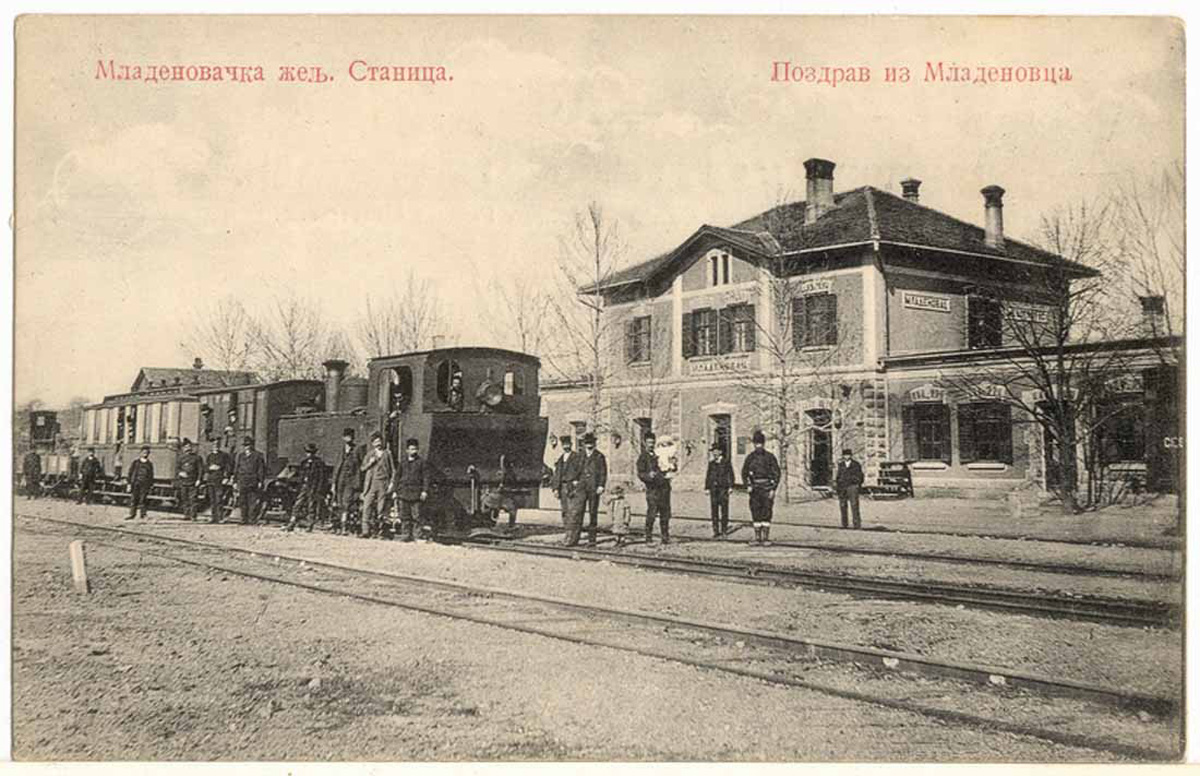
Mladenovac railway, ca 1912

Mladenovac railway station is a railway station on Belgrade–Niš railway. It is located in Mladenovac, Belgrade, Serbia. The railroad continues to Kovačevac in one direction and to Sopot Kosmajski in the other. Mladenovac railway station consists of six railway tracks.

== See also ==
- Serbian Railways
- Beovoz
- BG Voz
