= Vukov Spomenik railway station =

Subway station in Belgrade, Serbia

Vukov Spomenik Вуков споменик
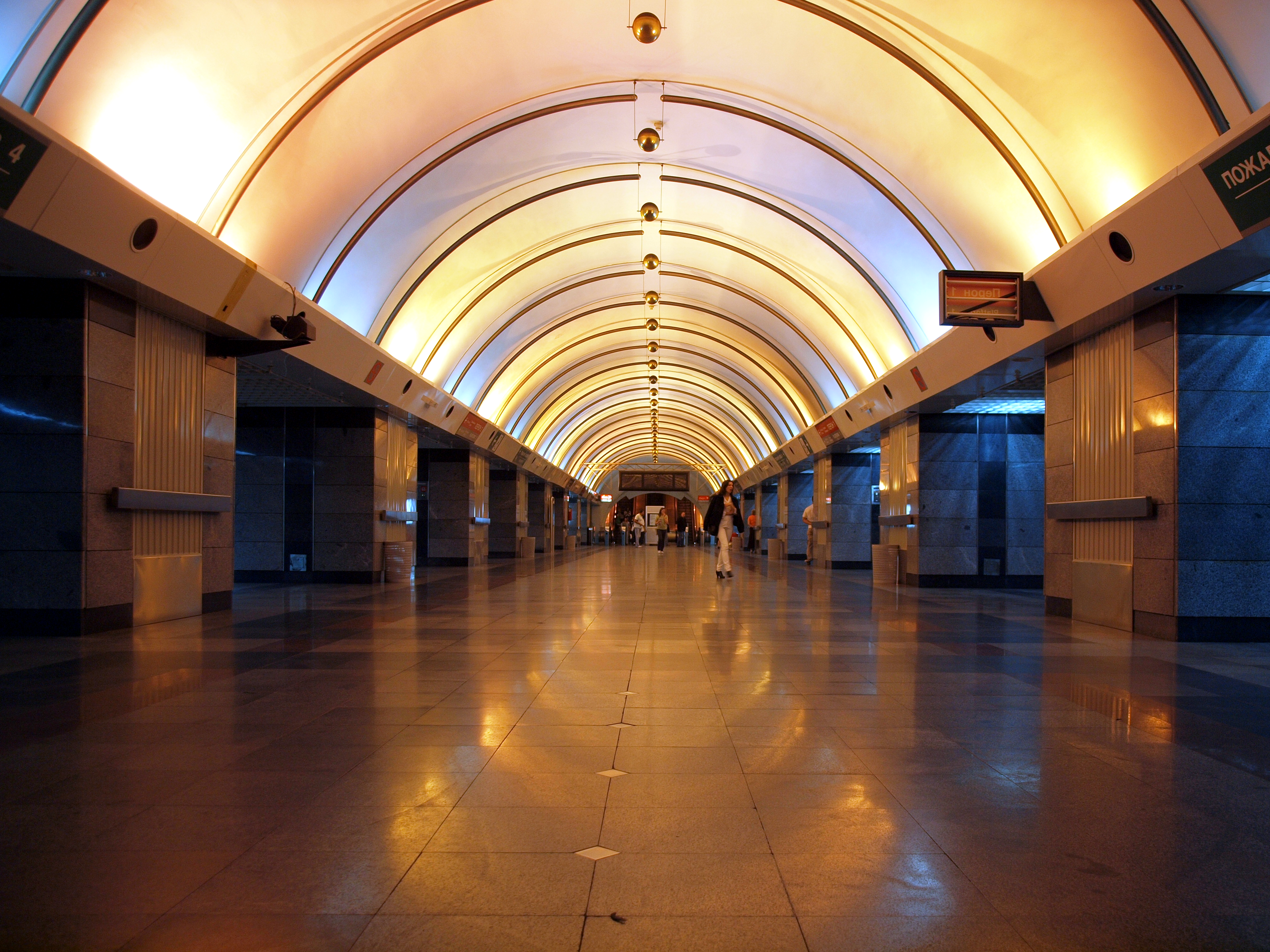
- Underground station Vukov spomenik

General information
- Location: Ruzveltova Street, b.b. Zvezdara, Belgrade; Serbia
- Coordinates: 44°48′18.8″N 20°28′38.44″E
- Owner: Serbian Railways Infrastructure
- Platforms: 2 (1 island)
- Tracks: 2
- Connections: from Vukov spomenik stop at Ruzveltova Street: 2 - from and to Pristanište (circle line); 3 - from Omladinski stadion to Κneževac; 5 - from Kalemegdan to Ustanička; 8 - from Omladinski stadion to Banjica; 12 - from Omladinski stadion to Banovo brdo; 14 - from Ustanička to Banjica; 25, 25P - to multiple termini; from Vukov spomenik /Kralja Aleksandra/ at King Alexander Boulevard: 5 - from Kalemegdan to Ustanička; 6 - from Tašmajdan to Ustanička; 7 - from Ustanička to Blok 45; 14 - from Ustanička to Banjica; from Vukov spomenik stop at Kraljice Marije Street; 32, 66, EKO1 - to multiple termini; from Tehnički fakulteti stop at King Alexander Boulevard: 26, 27, 27, EKO1 - to multiple termini

Construction
- Structure type: Underground
- Parking: 122 spots
- Accessible: No

History
- Opened: 7 July 1995; 31 years ago

Services
Preceding station	BG Voz	Following station
Karađorđe's Park towards Batajnica	Line 1	Pančevački most towards Ovča
Karađorđe's Park towards Resnik	Line 2	Pančevački most towards Ovča
Karađorđe's Park towards Mladenovac	Line 3	Pančevački most towards Ovča
Karađorđe's Park towards Lazarevac	Line 4	Pančevački most towards Ovča
Preceding station	Srbijavoz	Following station
Karađorđe's Park towards Zemun	Re (Regio)	Pančevački most towards Vršac
Location
- Location within Belgrade

Vukov Spomenik railway station (Serbian: Железничка станица Вуков споменик, Železnička stanica Vukov spomenik) is an underground rail station in Belgrade, the capital of Serbia. Located in the urban neighborhood Vukov Spomenik, in the municipality Zvezdara, the railway continues to Karađorđe's Park railway station in one direction and the Pančevo Bridge station in the other direction. Vukov Spomenik railway station consists of 2 railway tracks. It has been described as "one of the most beautiful railway objects, built in the worst period of the state".

== History ==
Construction began in 1989, during the existence of the Socialist Federative Republic of Yugoslavia and more-or-less stable situation. However, major works were conducted in the 1990s, during the international embargo imposed on the succeeding Federal Republic of Yugoslavia. According to the mayor of Belgrade during the construction, Slobodanka Gruden, one of the financiers was a would-be banker Dafina Milanović, head of one of the largest pyramid schemes in Serbia. As a counter service, she was to be awarded with the numerous office space in the commercial section of the station. However, her scheme fell apart in 1993, before the station was finished. The project was executed by the Energoprojekt company.

Architect Miroslav Simeunović was in charge of the quality and deadlines control during the construction. Hurrying to finish one of the phases, a section below the Ruzveltova Street, was hastily done. The section spread from the station to the Technical faculties across the Ruzveltova and consisted of the upper layer with the carriageways above it. In a hurry to finish it to January 1994 a botched insulation using the sub-standard foil was used. Simeunović protested but his contract was unilaterally breached. The layer was simply buried, the carriageway was paved with asphalt and the tram rails were placed. After the first rain, water came through the protective layer, flooding the shops in the commercial zone and all attempts to fix the problem from the inside failed. Simeunović pointed out that the excellent opportunity to fix the problem was the massive reconstruction of Ruzveltova in 2017, but the protective layer of the station remained as it was.

Projected as one of the stations of the future Belgrade Metro, it was opened on 7 July 1995.

In 2016 city organized design competition and the project for revitalization of both the underground station and the plateau above it was chosen in 2017. All obstacles were to be removed from the plateau and to integrate it in the surrounding Cyril and Methodius Park. Though accepted and green-lighted, the project remained on paper only. As of 2018, the facility somewhat deteriorated. The escalators are in bad shape and out of use for years, the numerous shops, intended for the commercial venues, are mostly empty while the slabs on the plateau above it also deteriorated. It is expected that the station will be refurbished after the construction of the subway starts. Condition of the venue worsened and in April 2019 deputy mayor Goran Vesić said that the Vukov Spomenik station is in the "worst shape of all" urban train stations. In April 2022, state railway company announced that some minor repairs were conducted, and that €3 million were allocated for the incoming, full reconstruction.

In April 2023 it was announced that the station will be closed on 9 May 2023 for the escalators replacement. The trains will continue to pass through the station, but the station itself will be nonoperative. The escalators were overhauled only once since the station was opened in 1995. The public was stunned as the length of the works was set to 72 weeks, or year and a half. Similar-sized escalators in Munich's Karlsplatz station recently replaced in only two months.

Serbian Railways responded that the task is "extremely big and complex" and that spare parts are hard to find as the manufacturer is the Russian "Eskalator" factory from Saint Petersburg. It was also suggested that this lengthy closing should be used for the lowering of the platforms from present 95 centimetres (37 in) above the tracks to the European standard of 55 centimetres (22 in). This was rejected, so the station will have to be closed again at some point in the future.

== Major safety concerns ==
The Vukov Spomenik railway station, has faced significant safety concerns related to fire protection and the transport of hazardous materials.

Since July 2018, trains carrying dangerous cargo like flammable liquids and acids have passed through the Vračar Railway Tunnel, which includes the station, despite lacking safety measures. A 2018 inspection revealed that the station did not have a fire protection plan, and evacuation in case of fire was deemed unsafe. Additionally, firefighting teams lacked proper equipment for intervention, posing severe risks during incidents. Despite these violations, authorities failed to close the tunnel and station. The station's fire safety deficiencies include uncontrolled fire suppression systems and the lack of a detection system for explosive atmospheres, creating the potential for sparks and explosions. Inspections conducted in 2014 and 2018 uncovered numerous violations, leading to multiple safety citations. However, despite these findings, hazardous material transport continued. A study commissioned in 2020 confirmed that fire risk for passengers remained notably high.

== Characteristics ==
The station is projected to accommodate 15,000 passengers per hour, but as it never took the role intended within the Belgrade railway junction or Belgrade Metro, this number was never achieved. Still, it became one of the most important hubs in the Belgrade railway system. It became an intercity station when in 2018 it began serving the trains to Vršac.

The total floor area of the railway platform is 2,500 m^{2} (27,000 sq ft) and it is located 40 m (130 ft) below the ground. The slanted tunnel with escalators, which connects the platforms and the vestibule above, is 65 m (213 ft) long. The descent by escalators takes a minute and a half. One of the deepest stations in Europe, its central and side platforms are 220 metres (720 ft) long, while the tunnels are at an angle of 30°, with a diameter of 7.5 metres (25 ft). The escalators themselves are 30.8 metres (101 ft) high, 61.4 metres (201 ft) long, with a capacity of 13,500 commuters per hour per escalator.

The interior was mostly done in granite, with decorative details. The station is embellished with several reliefs, including one called "Belgrade since the time of despot Stefan", and Cyrillic letters.

== Gallery ==
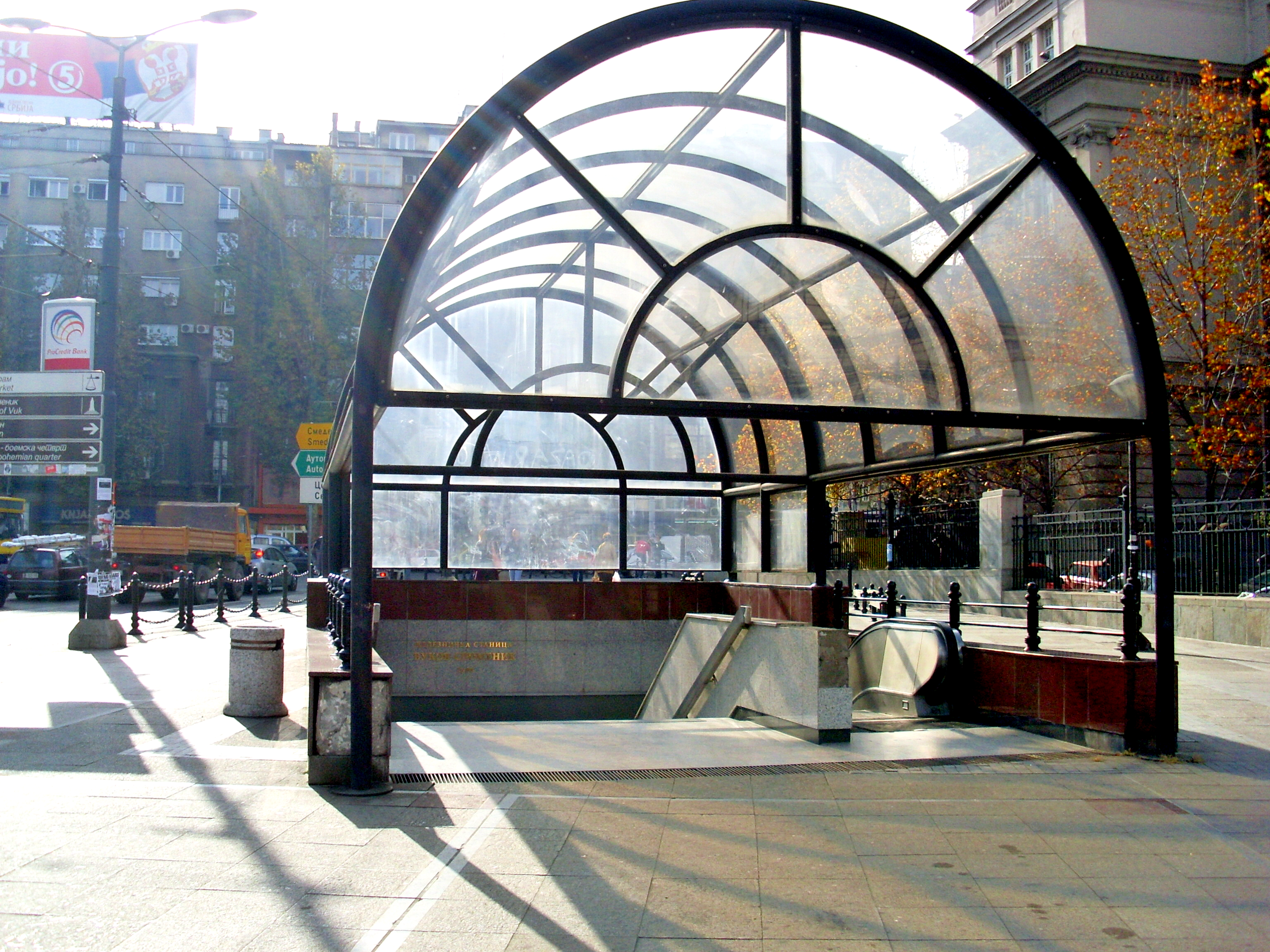
One of the outside entrances

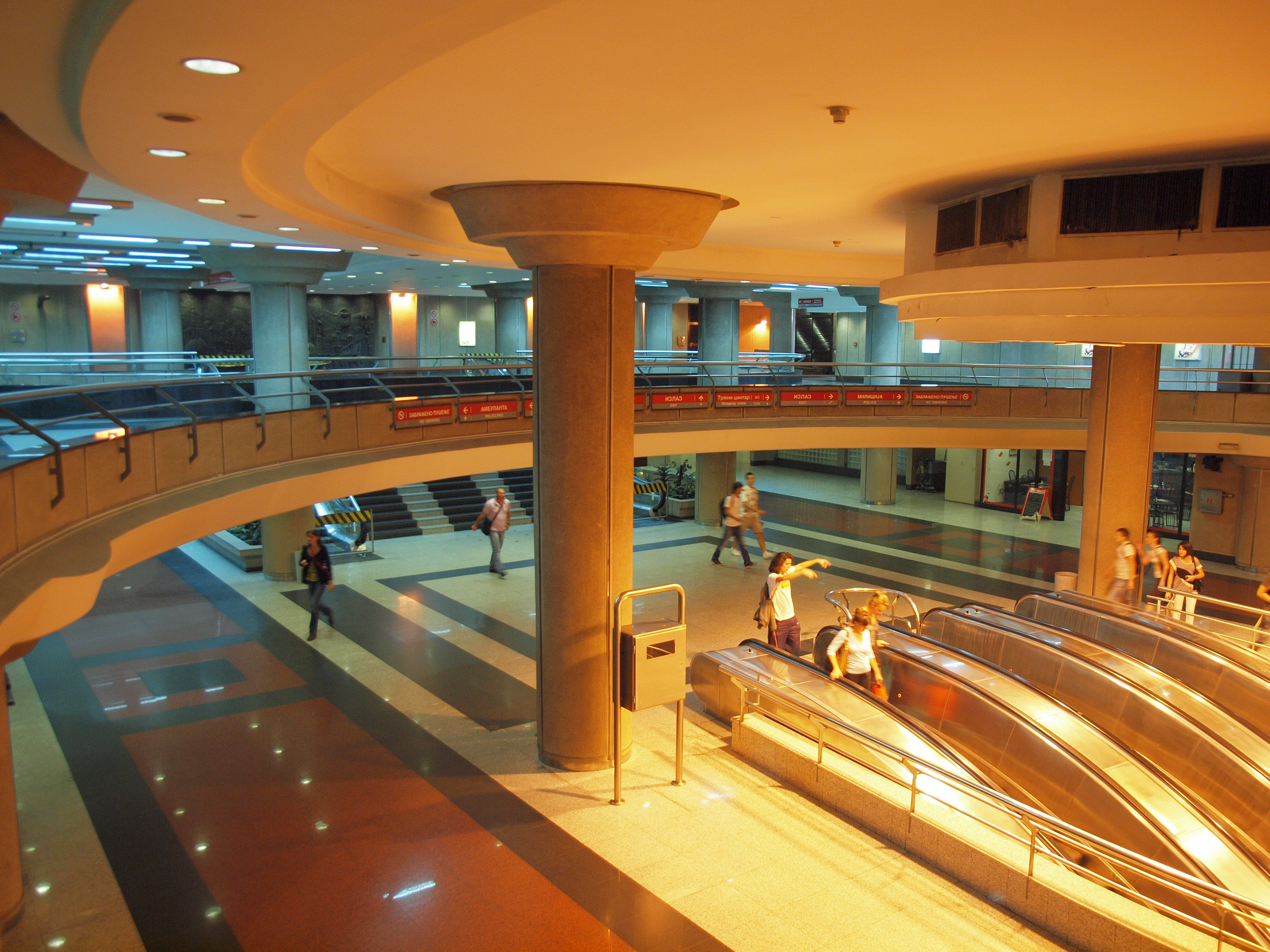
Commercial area at first level

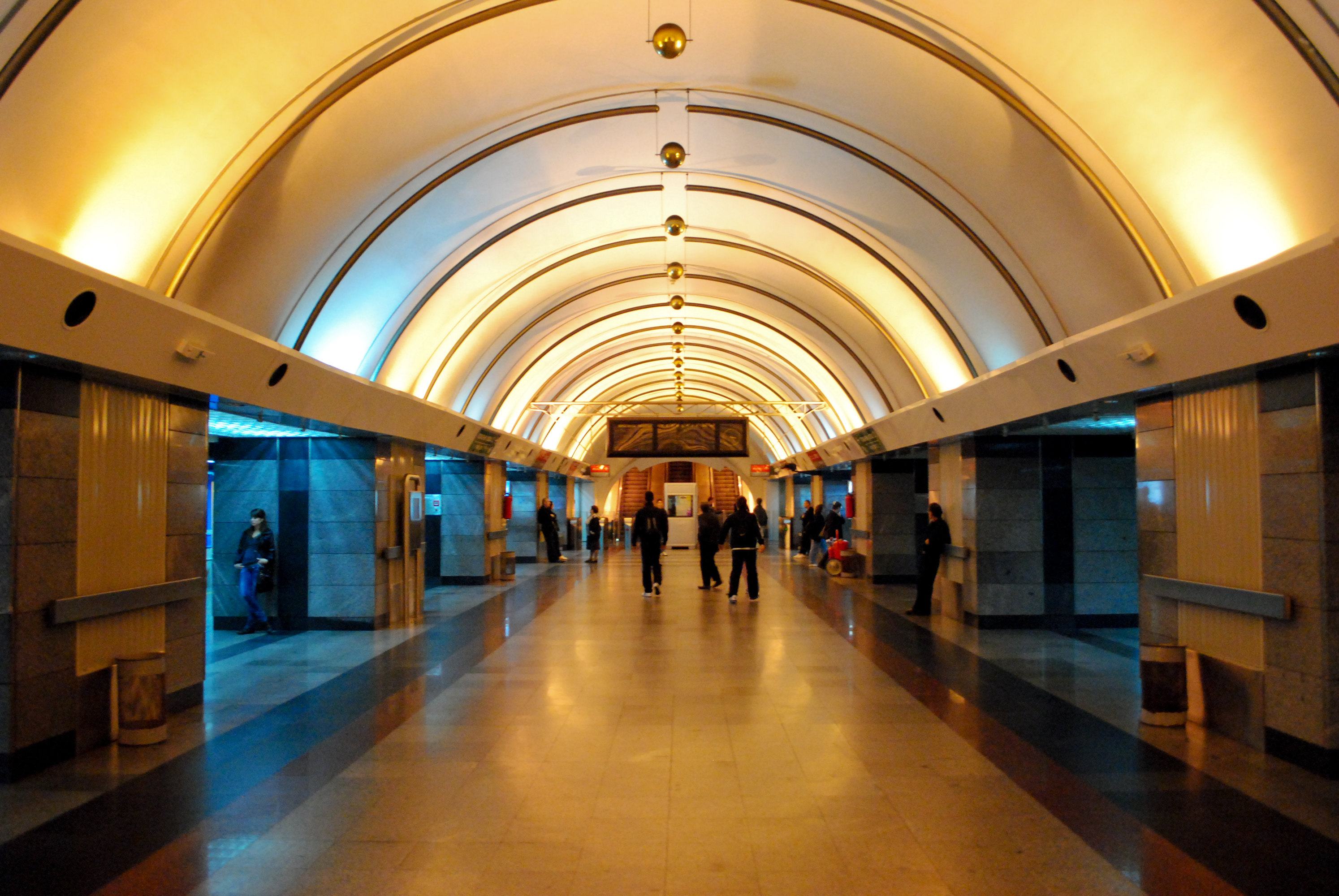
Station hall

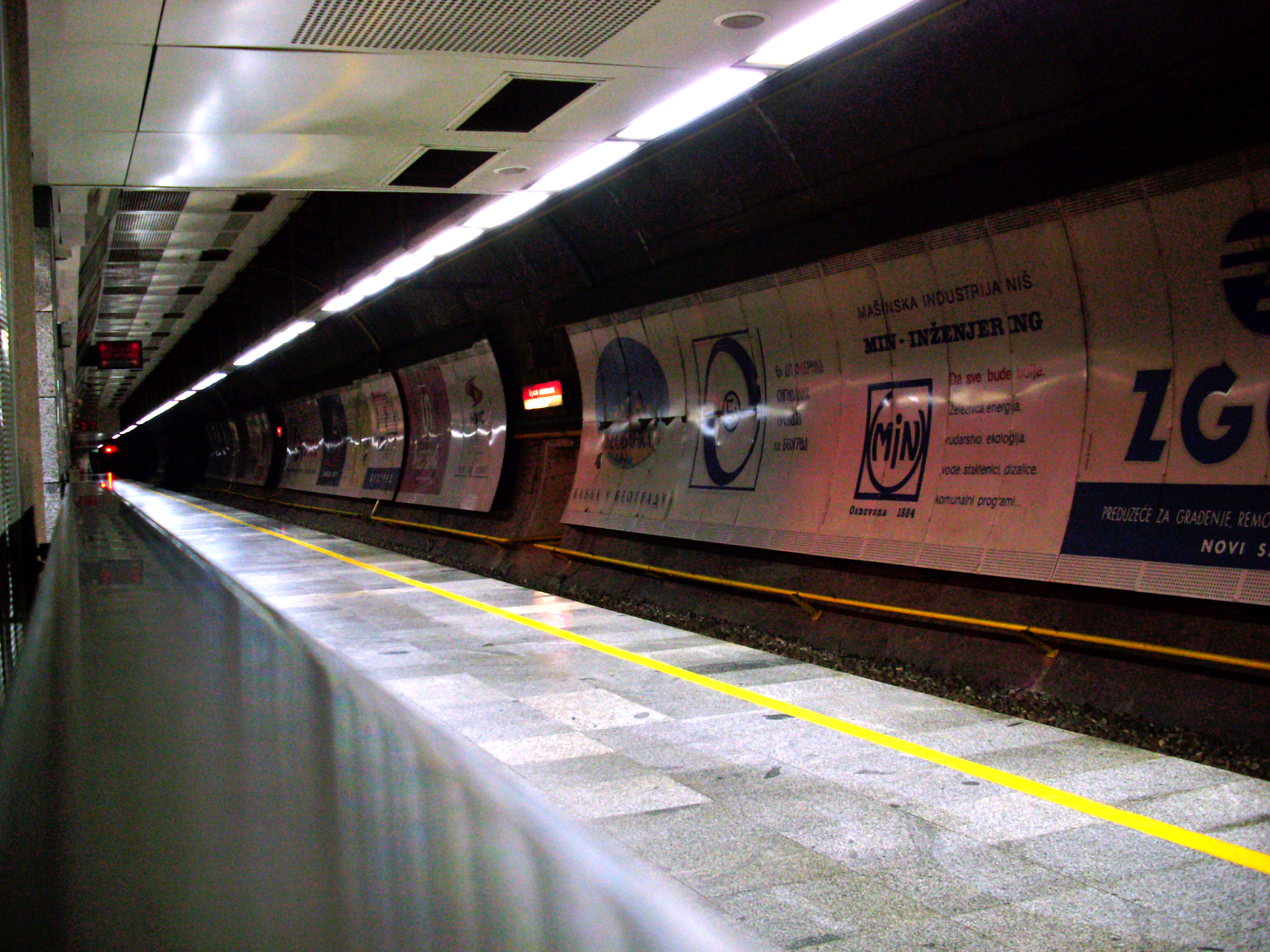
Trains stop

== See also ==
- Serbian Railways
- Belgrade railway junction
- Beovoz
- BG Voz
- Vukov Spomenik
