= Beovoz =

Former urban rail system in Belgrade, Serbia

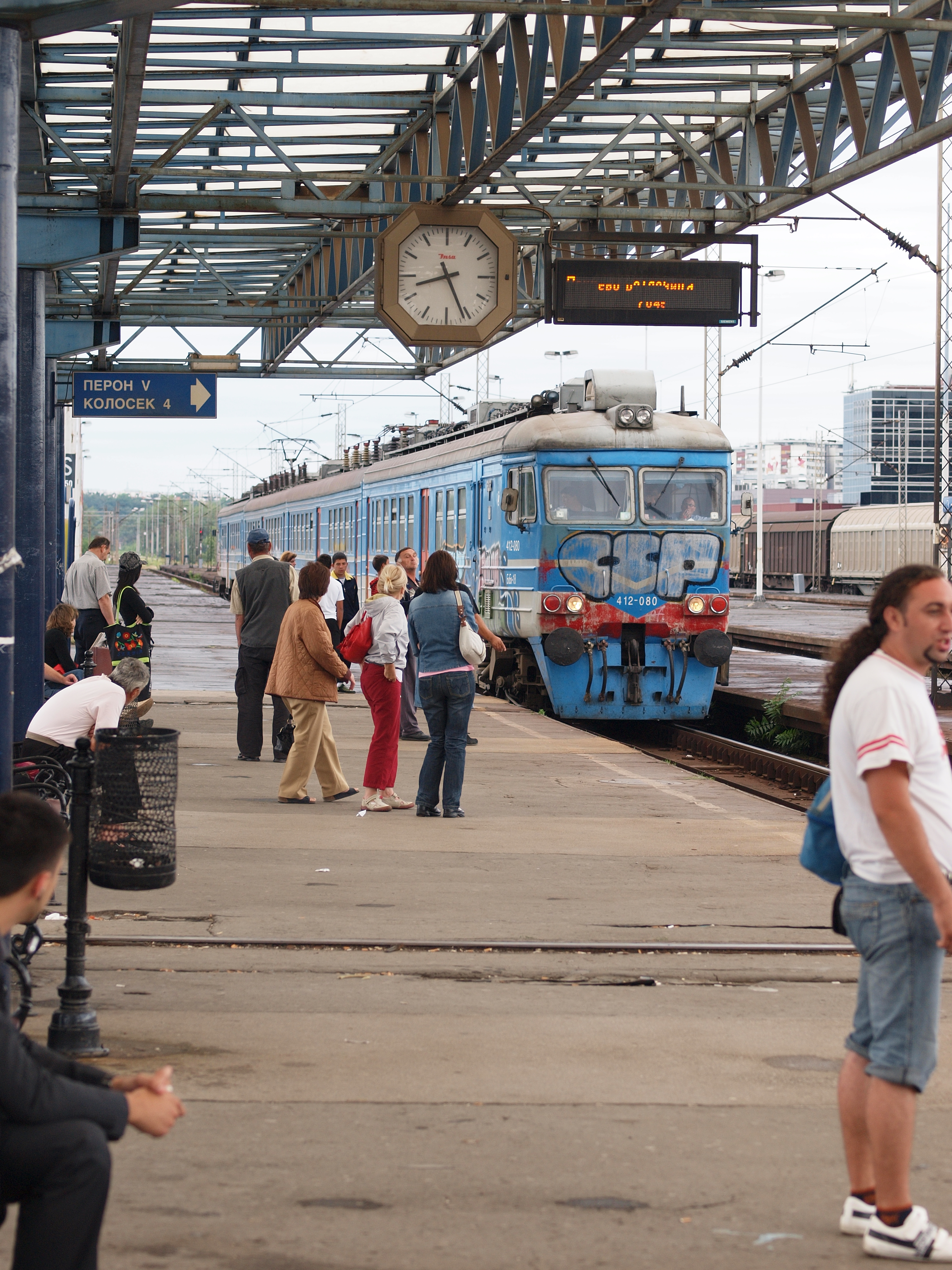

Overview
- Native name: Serbian Cyrillic: Беовоз
- Locale: Belgrade, Serbia
- Transit type: commuter rail
- Number of lines: 6
- Number of stations: 41

Operation
- Began operation: 1992
- Ended operation: ca. 2013
- Operator: Serbian Railways

Technical
- System length: 70 km
- Track gauge: 1,435 mm (4 ft 8 1/2 in)

Beovoz (Serbian Cyrillic: Беовоз, stylized as БЕОВОЗ – BEOVOZ) was a commuter rail that provided mass-transit service within the Belgrade metropolitan area. The main usage of system was to connect the suburbs with downtown Belgrade. Beovoz was operated by Serbian Railways.

The Belgrade suburban railway system connects the suburbs and nearby cities to the west, north and south of the city.

== History ==
The reconstruction of the Belgrade railway junction began in 1971, since 1977 the construction of a central section about 10 km long, with several tunnels on it, began. Since 1984, traffic began along the route Batajnica - Beograd Main Station, and the official opening took place in 1992, when tunneling under the city center was completed and electric trains were launched in three directions: Batajnica in the west, Pančevo in the north and Resnik in the south of Belgrade. The operational control center is located at the Belgrade Center station, also known as Prokop. The construction of this station, which should have received not only suburban, but also intercity and international passenger trains, has not yet been completed.

On July 7, 1995, 2 underground stations were opened in the longest tunnel leading to the Pančevo Bridge.

The lines operate electric trains of the machine-building plant Rīgas Vagonbūves Rūpnīca ER31 and ER35, with three-door cars and 1435 mm gauge bogies. Since 2010, modern trains have been purchased to replace worn-out Riga trains.

For a long time Beovoz intervals were significant, from half an hour on the main line Pančevo bridge - Batajnica, to just a few trains per day on peripheral sections. The system was not popular with residents of the city, but was in demand by residents of the suburbs for trips to Belgrade. In 2007, Beovoz carried about 4.5 million passengers.

In 2010, the section Pančevo bridge - New Belgrade was reconstructed and included in the new system of urban electric trains, called the BG Voz. An important difference of the new system is the tact timetable for the movement of electric trains: at rush hour, the intervals are exactly 15 minutes, the rest of the time - half an hour. In 2011, the tracks were reconstructed to Batajnica station and this section was also included in the new system.

== Ridership ==
Beovoz handled 6,182,000 passengers in 2006.

== Service area ==
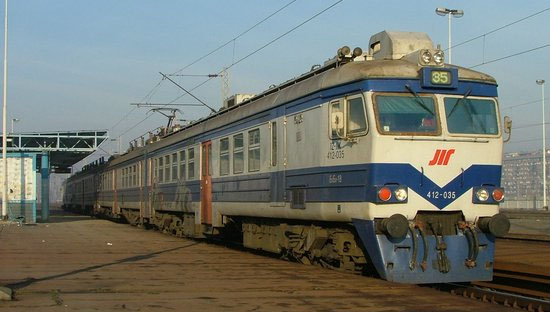
Beovoz 412 engine

There were four lines in the Belgrade underground railway network:

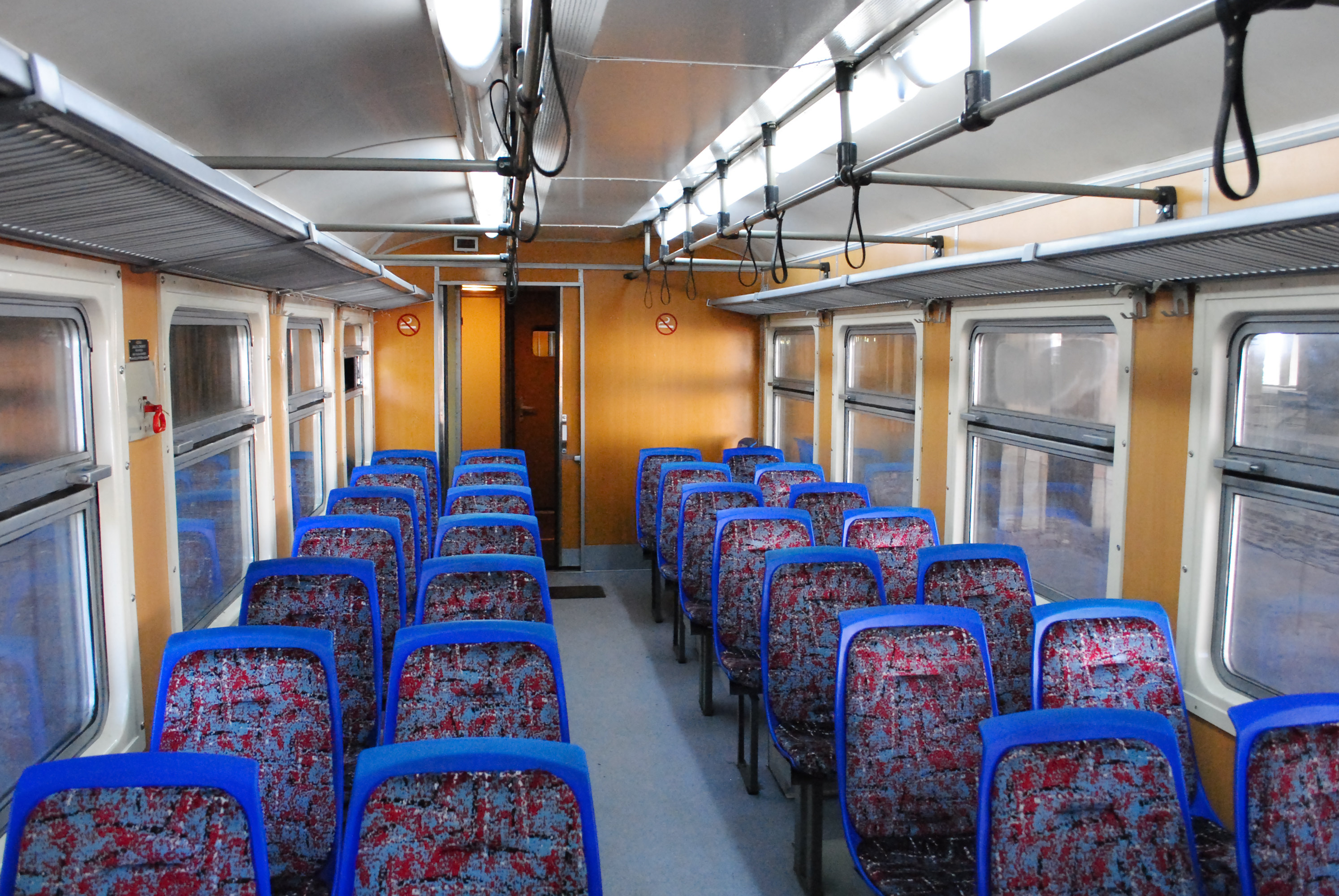
Interior of a Beovoz train

- Inđija - Novi Beograd - Vukov Spomenik - Pančevo Vojlovica
- Velika Plana - Rakovica - Novi Beograd - Zemun - Inđija
- Mladenovac - Ripanj - Rakovica - Vukov Spomenik - Pančevo Vojlovica
- Valjevo - Rakovica - Vukov Spomenik - Pančevo Vojlovica

Most stations were above ground. Vukov Spomenik and Karađorđev Park—the two underground stations of the Beovoz system—are located in downtown Belgrade.

== Closure ==
Following introduction of BG Voz back in 2010, many vehicles used in Beovoz were rerouted towards new system. After the beginning of reconstruction of Pančevo bridge in 2013, some of the main lines (Belgrade-Pančevo and Valjevo-Pančevo) were abolished, while others were included in Serbian railways regional system. After this, Beovoz became officially defunct.

== The rolling stock ==
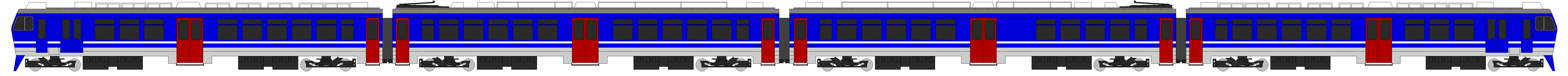

The line operates nine ER31 4-car electric trains manufactured by the Rīgas Vagonbūves Rūpnīca with an upper current collection and three doors on the sides of the cars, repaired at the expense of the city specifically for intracity transportation.

== See also ==
- Belgrade Metro
- BG Voz
- List of Beovoz stations
- List of suburban and commuter rail systems
