= Sebeš railway station =

Railway station in Serbia

Sebeš Себеш
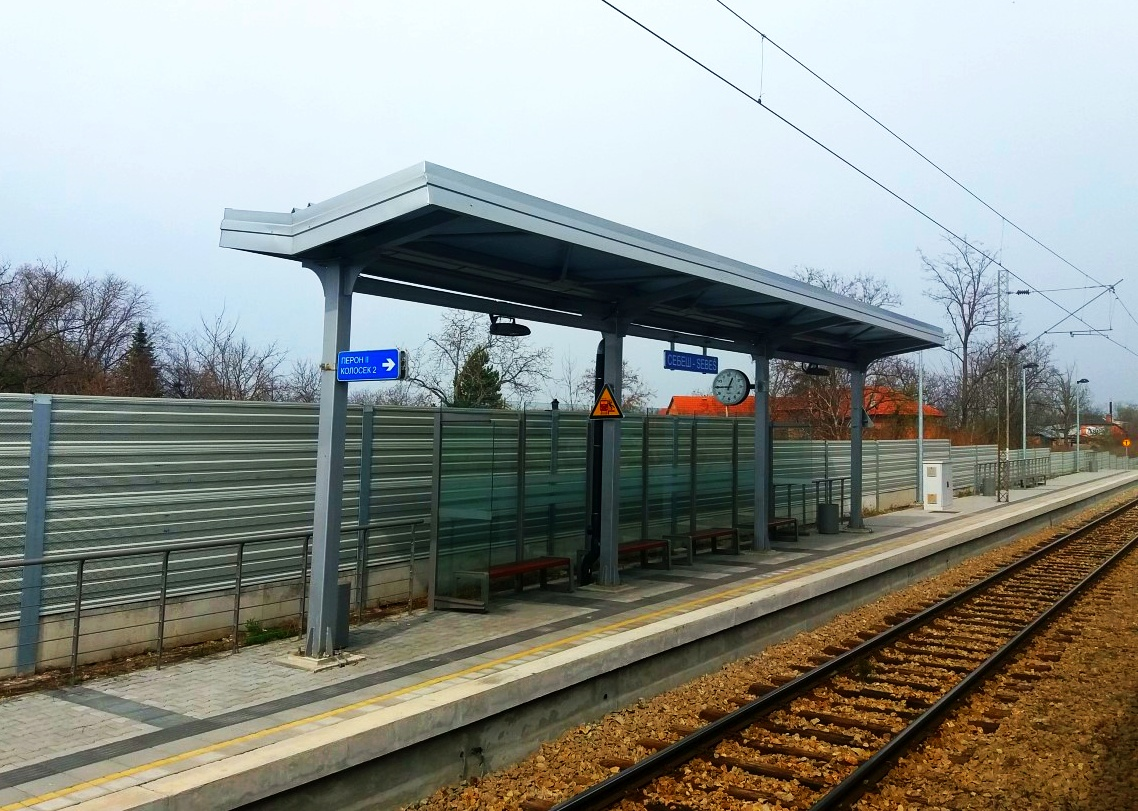
- View of Platform 1

General information
- Location: Sebeš; Serbia
- Coordinates: 44.8612°N 20.5194°E
- Owner: Serbian Railways
- Platforms: 2 side platforms
- Tracks: 2
- Connections: 108

Construction
- Structure type: At grade
Route map
Location

Sebeš railway station (Serbian: Железничка станица Себеш; Železnička stanica Sebeš) is a railway stop serving the hamlet of Sebeš, in Palilula municipality of Belgrade, Serbia.

Updated in 2016, the station has two side platforms with two tracks. It is served by BG Voz and by Srbija Voz line 52 connecting Pančevo Vojlovica to Pančevački Most.

The station is connected with the Belgrade public transit bus line 108.
