= Krnjača railway station =

Railway station in Belgrade, Serbia

Krnjača Крњача
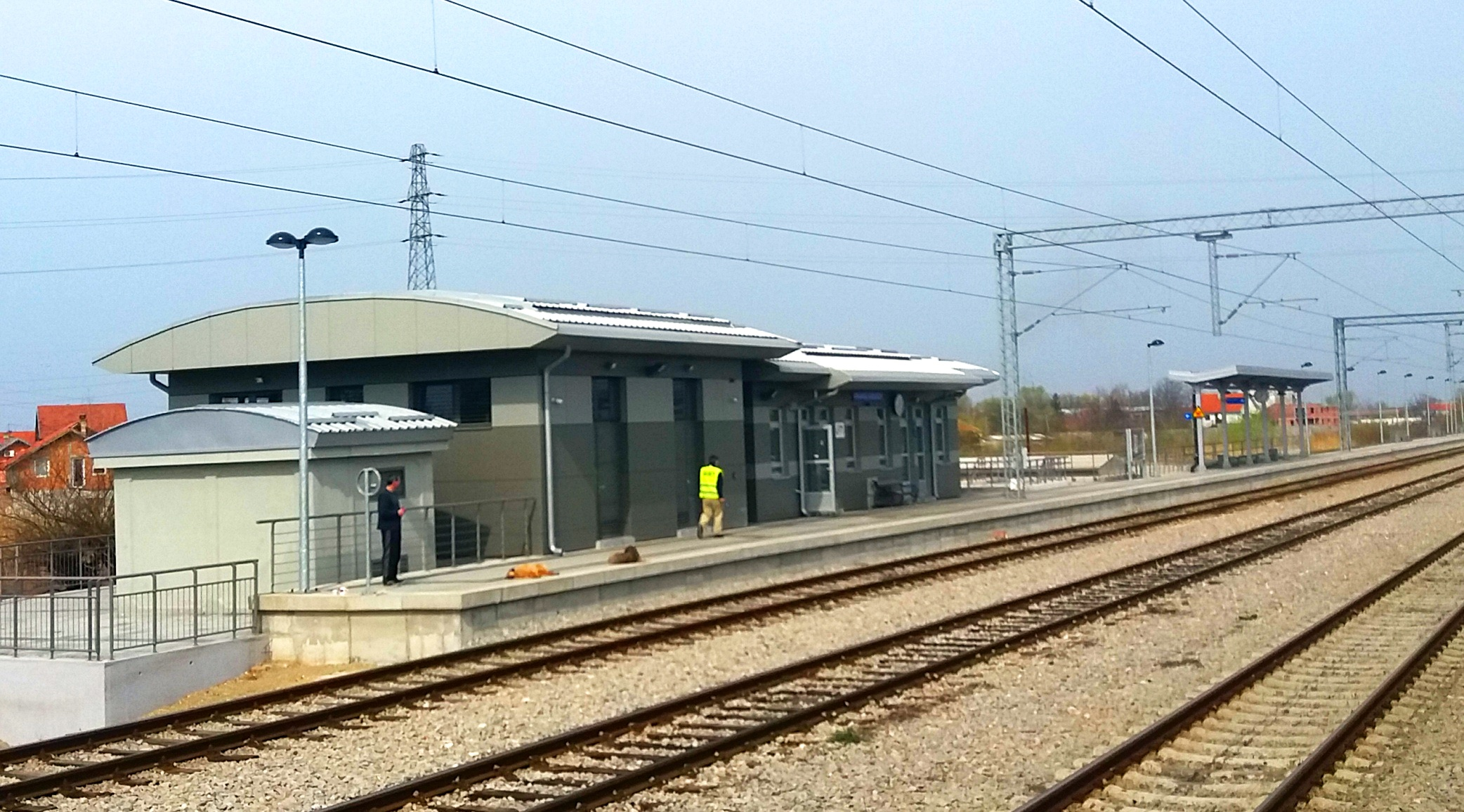
- View of Platform 1

General information
- Location: Krnjača; Serbia
- Coordinates: 44.848°N 20.506°E
- Owner: Serbian Railways
- Platforms: 2 side platforms
- Tracks: 4

Construction
- Structure type: At grade
Route map
Location

Krnjača railway station (Serbian: Железничка станица Крњача; Železnička stanica Krnjača) is a railway station serving the settlement of Krnjača, in Palilula municipality of Belgrade, Serbia.

Updated in 2016, the station has two side platforms with four tracks. It is served by BG Voz and by Srbija Voz line 52 connecting Pančevo Vojlovica to Pančevački Most.

The station has no connections with other public transport.
