= Krnjača Bridge railway station =

Railway station in Serbia

Krnjača–most Крњача–мост
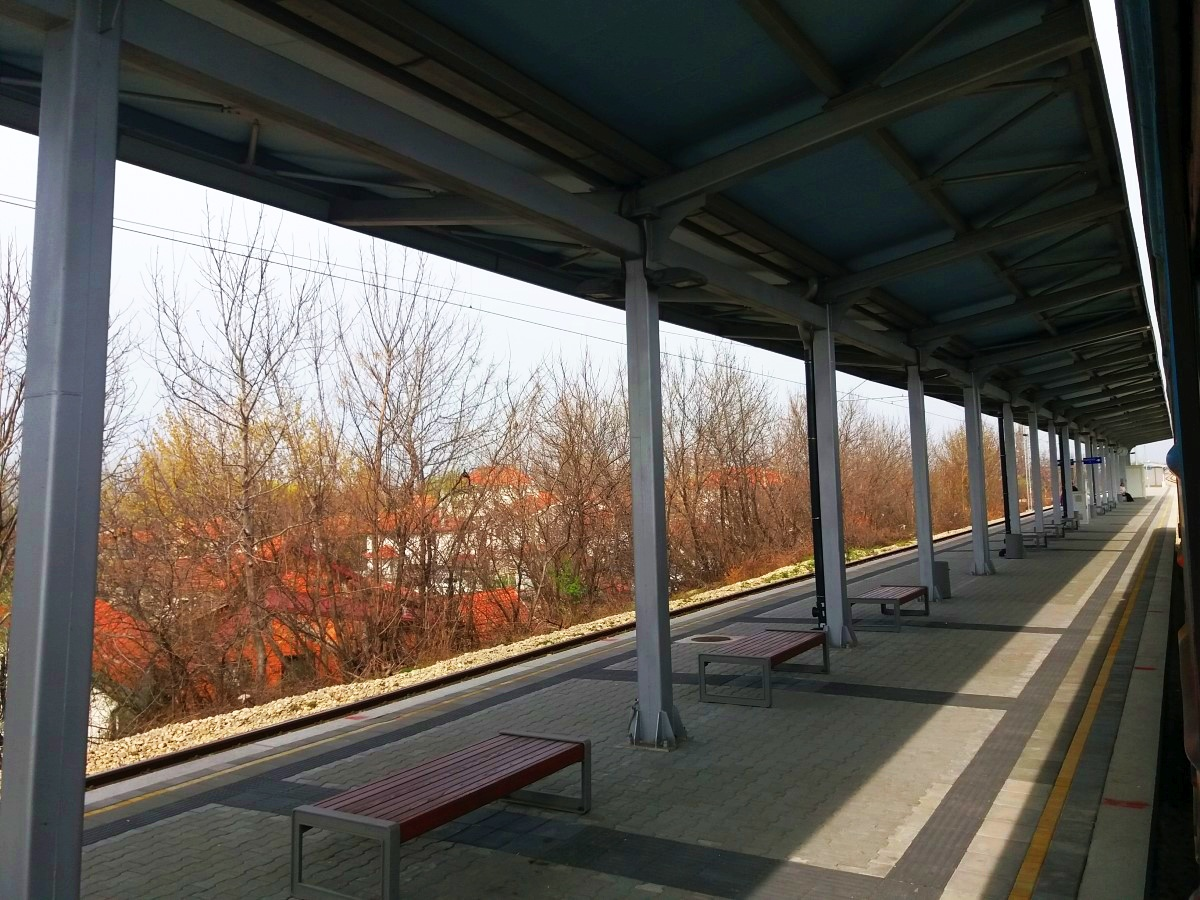
- Platform view

General information
- Location: Serbia
- Coordinates: 44.84°N 20.497°E
- Owner: Serbian Railways Infrastructure
- Platforms: 1 island platform
- Tracks: 2
- Connections: 108

Construction
- Structure type: At grade (embankment)

History
- Opened: 2016
Route map
Location

Krnjača Bridge railway station (Serbian: Железничка станица Крњача–мост; Železnička stanica Krnjača–most) is a railway stop serving the outskirts of Krnjača settlement in Palilula municipality of Belgrade, Serbia.

Opened in 2016, the stop has two tracks with a single island platform. It is served by BG Voz and by Srbija Voz line 52 connecting Pančevo Vojlovica to Pančevački Most. The stop's name (literally: Krnjača–bridge) comes from its proximity to Pančevo Bridge.

The stop is connected with the Belgrade public transit bus line 108. In the vicinity there is also a bus stop with several other public transit lines.
