= Pančevo Bridge =

Bridge over the Danube in Belgrade, Serbia

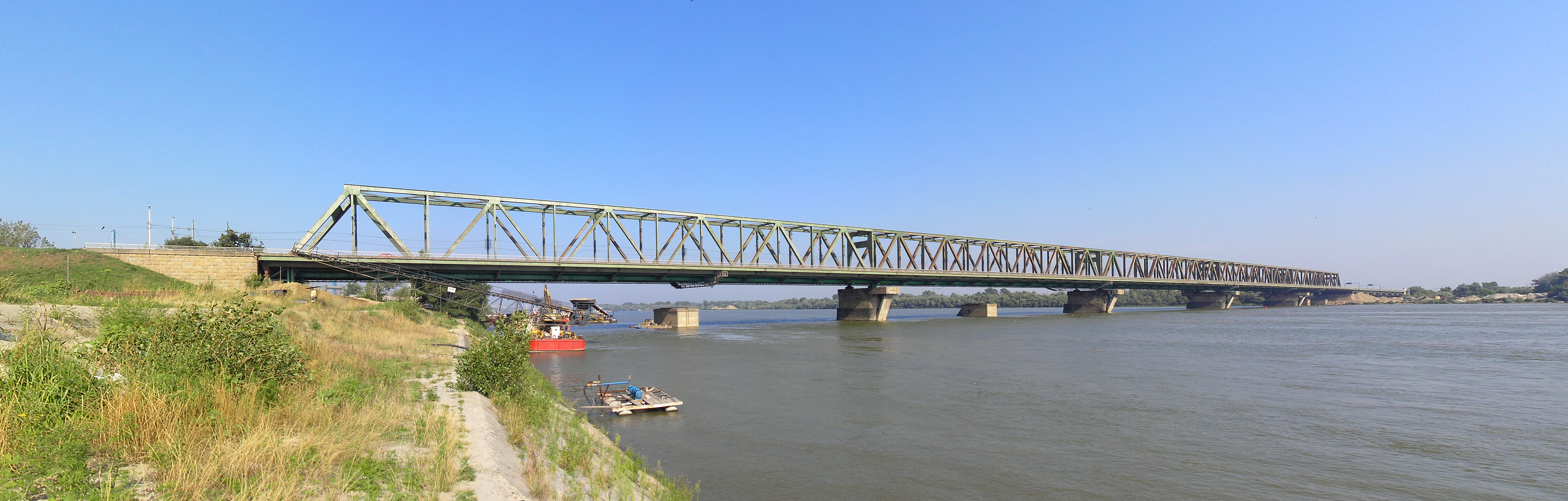
- Sideview of the bridge from the right riverside
- Coordinates: 44.828°N 20.492°E
- Carries: Motor vehicles, Pedestrians, Bicycles
- Crosses: Danube
- Official name: Панчевачки мост Pančevački most
- Maintained by: Putevi Srbije

Characteristics
- Total length: 1,526.4 m
- Height: 18 m
- Longest span: 162 m

History
- Construction start: 1933
- Construction end: 1946
- Opened: 7 November 1946; 78 years ago

Statistics
- Daily traffic: 100,000
- Toll: No

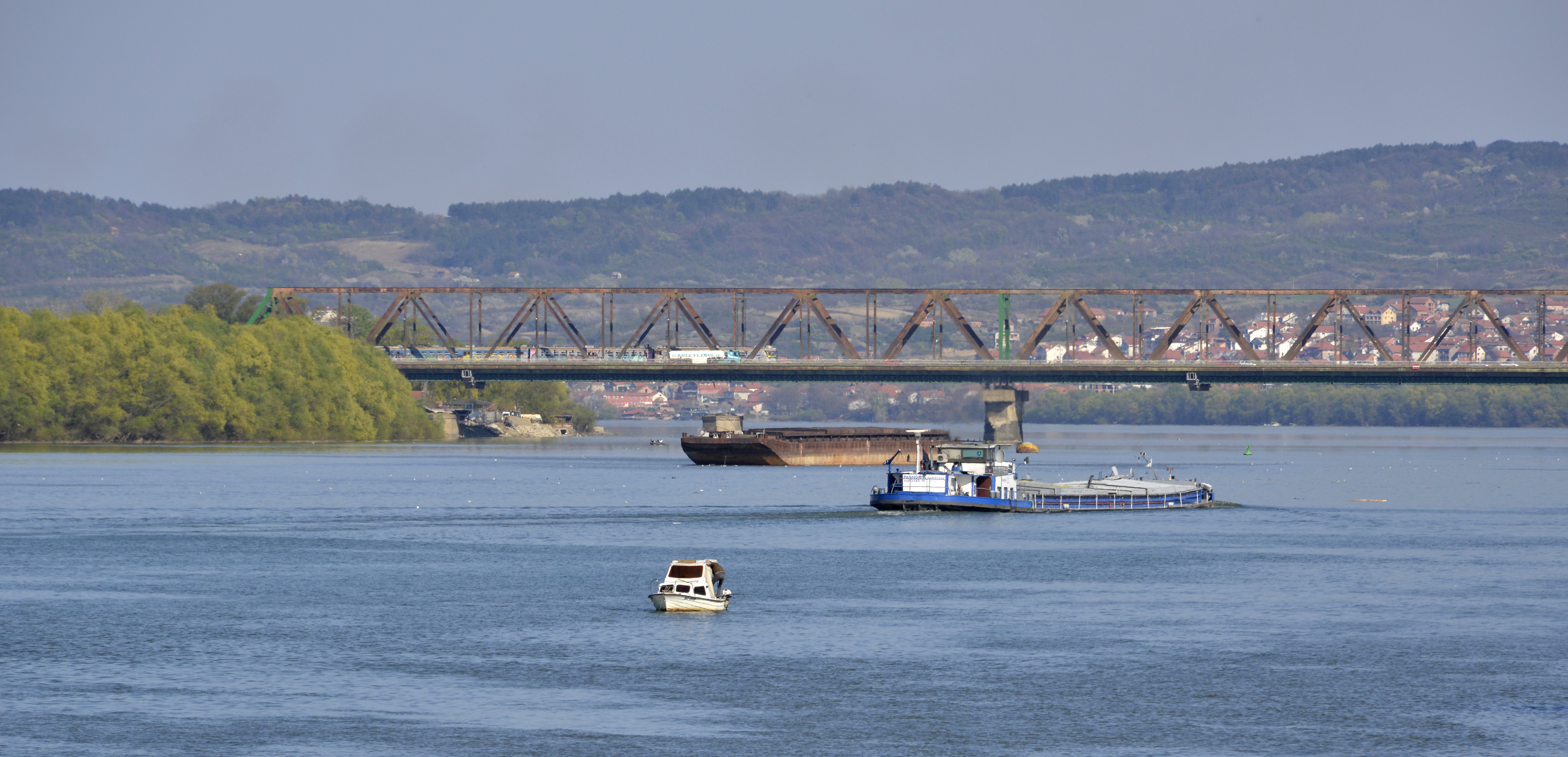
Pančevo Bridge

Pančevo Bridge (Serbian Cyrillic: Панчевачки мост, romanized: Pančevački most) or colloquially Pančevac (Serbian Cyrillic: Панчевац, romanized: Pančevac) is a bridge over the Danube in Belgrade, the capital of Serbia. It was named after the northern city of Pančevo (in Vojvodina) which is connected to Belgrade by the road continuing from the bridge. It was the first permanent bridge across the Danube in Belgrade, and until December 2014, when the Pupin Bridge opened further upstream in the municipality of Zemun, the only one.

== Location ==
The bridge is located in the Belgrade municipality of Palilula, which is the only municipality in the city that lies on both banks of the Danube. Geographically, it connects two large regions of Serbia, Šumadija and Banat (Pančevački Rit). The bridge approaches begin well back from the bridge itself in the neighborhoods of Bogoslovija (roundabout at Mije Kovačevića Street) and Ada Huja (Višnjička Street), while the direct approach begins from the Boulevard of Despot Stefan.

The bridge spans the industrial zone along the Danube's right bank in the neighborhood of Viline Vode, the Danube (at approximately river's 1,166 kilometres (725 mi)), and reaches the Banat side in the neighborhood of Krnjača, between the sub-neighborhoods of Blok Braća Marić, on the right, and Blok Branko Momirov, on the left. There is a large access interchange on this side, too, with the carriageways forking in two, marking the borders of the sub-neighborhood Blok Grga Andrijanović. The Zrenjanin Road is to the left, the Pančevo Road to the east, with the railway between them.

== History ==
=== Origin ===
Construction of the original bridge began in 1933. On 27 October 1935 it was inaugurated by the Prince regent of Yugoslavia, Pavle Karađorđević and mayor Vlada Ilić, and named after the still minor King of Yugoslavia, Petar II (Most Kralja Petra II). The construction of the bridge attracted international attention, especially due to its length. At the time of the construction, it was one of the longest bridges in Europe, so it cause international media attention. The original bridge had arched steel construction, and arched access pillars on both banks.

=== World War II ===
After the German attack on Yugoslavia on 6 April 1941 in the course of the World War II, the Yugoslav army command decided to blow up all three existing bridges in Belgrade (two over the Sava and one over the Danube) in a vain attempt to slow down the German Army advancement. Military commander of Belgrade, general Vojislav Nikolajević, was ordered to demolish them, and the order for the King Peter II Bridge was executed by major Velimir Piletić. As one of the "first infrastructural casualties" of the war, the Bridge of King Petar II was destroyed in the night between 10 and 11 April 1941.

The German occupational forces first placed a pontoon bridge over the Danube, named after general von Weichs. The bridge had the "noon break", when it was disconnected to let the ships pass. Later Germans decided to repair the demolished bridge for their purposes. It became operational again in October 1942. Germans used their own engineering experts, and Polish war prisoners. In the spring of 1944, the Allied Anglo-American bombing of Belgrade began. The bridge was hit and damaged in the bombings of April 16 and 3 September 1944. When the Germans began to withdraw from Belgrade in October 1944, they destroyed the bridge themselves.

=== Post-war ===
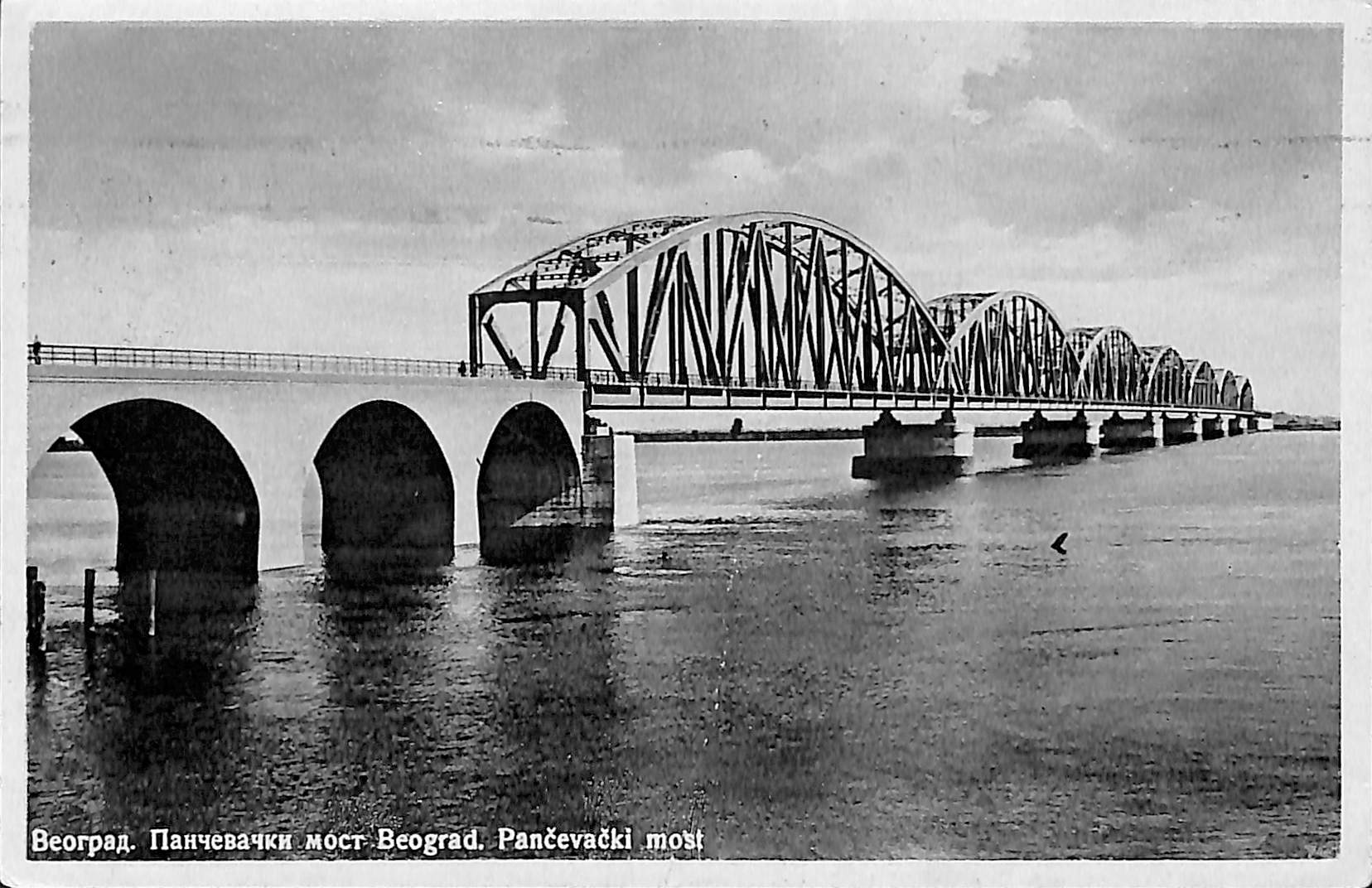
Bridge of King Peter II

Right after the liberation, the new authorities wanted to repair it as fast as possible, but the reconstruction was constantly delayed due to the scope of the project. In order to quicken things, Yugoslav government asked the government of the Soviet Union for help. On 27 September 1945, the Soviet government charged its special construction section with the task. Reconstruction of the bridge began in 1945, upstream from the remnants of the destroyed supporting piers. Plans were drawn up by the 50 Soviet engineers headed by Vladimir Golovko, lieutenant general of the Red Army's technical troops. The chief engineer was Nikolay Kolokolov. Kolokolov drafted the reconstruction plan which was to be executed in only one year, as Yugoslav government estimated that it would take three years to finish the job.

Joseph Stalin's orders were that they should build a provisory crossing rather than an expensive railway bridge, but Josip Broz Tito convinced him that a proper bridge should be built. On 7 November 1946, the first train passed over the new bridge and regular road traffic started three weeks later, on 29 November. Originally, Tito named it the Bridge of the Red Army (Most Crvene Armije). In 2020 it was discovered that, despite the popular use by the citizens and official use of the city administration of the name Pančevo Bridge, the name was never officially changed from the Bridge of the Red Army, or the paper trail was lost in time.

On 23 March 1963, a Soviet ship "Leningrad" was towing five, allegedly empty oil tankers. Passing under the bridge in the downstream direction, towards Smederevo, one of the tankers in the convoy hit one of the pillars of the bridge and immediately exploded. A few minutes later, when "Leningrad" towed all the tankers under the bridge, two smaller explosions were heard. By the time "Leningrad" reached several hundred meters away from the bridge, three tankers completely sank while two were cut in half by the explosions and protruded from the water. The debris from the explosion were scattered all over the area, while the bridge itself was damaged.

In 1965, the bridge had a major renovation, when it achieved its present appearance. Reconstruction project was drafted by engineer Ljubomir Jevtović. The massive pillars were expanded at the top, on the downstream side. This allowed the placement of the new, parallel bridge construction, which, in axis, was 7.53 metres (24.7 ft) distant from the old one. At any point, the traffic wasn't stopped as the placement of the new construction didn't obstruct the carriageways. When the new construction was placed around it, the old one was removed and the new structure was pushed into the projected axis by the powerful hydraulic presses. The works were fully finished in 1966. Some major maintenance works were also done in the 1970s.

Not counting the Đerdap dams on the Romanian border, Pančevo Bridge was the only bridge over the Danube in Serbia that was not destroyed by NATO forces during the bombing of Serbia from 24 March to 12 June 1999.

=== Early 21st century ===
After 2000, a general consensus was reached that new bridges in Belgrade are a necessity. Belgrade almost doubled after 1974 when the last bridge (Gazela) was built. As for the Pančevački Rit area, which has experienced a tenfold population growth since Pančevo Bridge was built, things are getting even more serious as city government has plans (though distant ones) to move Belgrade Port to the left bank and to begin a project of "Third Belgrade" in this area with 300,000–400,000 inhabitants (the first one is "Old" Belgrade in Šumadija; the second is "New" Belgrade, Novi Beograd-Zemun in Syrmia).

The bridge was considered to be in a fairly bad shape, as a result of lack of maintenance and overuse. Public debate grew (not just about this bridge) in both expert and lay circles, to the point of publicly expressing views in the mass media on a daily basis about future Belgrade bridges. City government plans to do a complete reconstruction of Pančevo Bridge and build three more bridges over the Danube, to alleviate the traffic pressure on it. One bridge is supposed to be built downstream, to connect the Belgrade suburb of Vinča to Omoljica in the Pančevo municipality. The second bridge is projected for just 1.5 kilometers downstream from Pančevo Bridge and it will connect Ada Huja and Krnjača. The third bridge is to be built upstream and will connect the neighborhoods of Zemun and Borča. Until this last bridge is finished, the city government has proposed a ferry line instead.

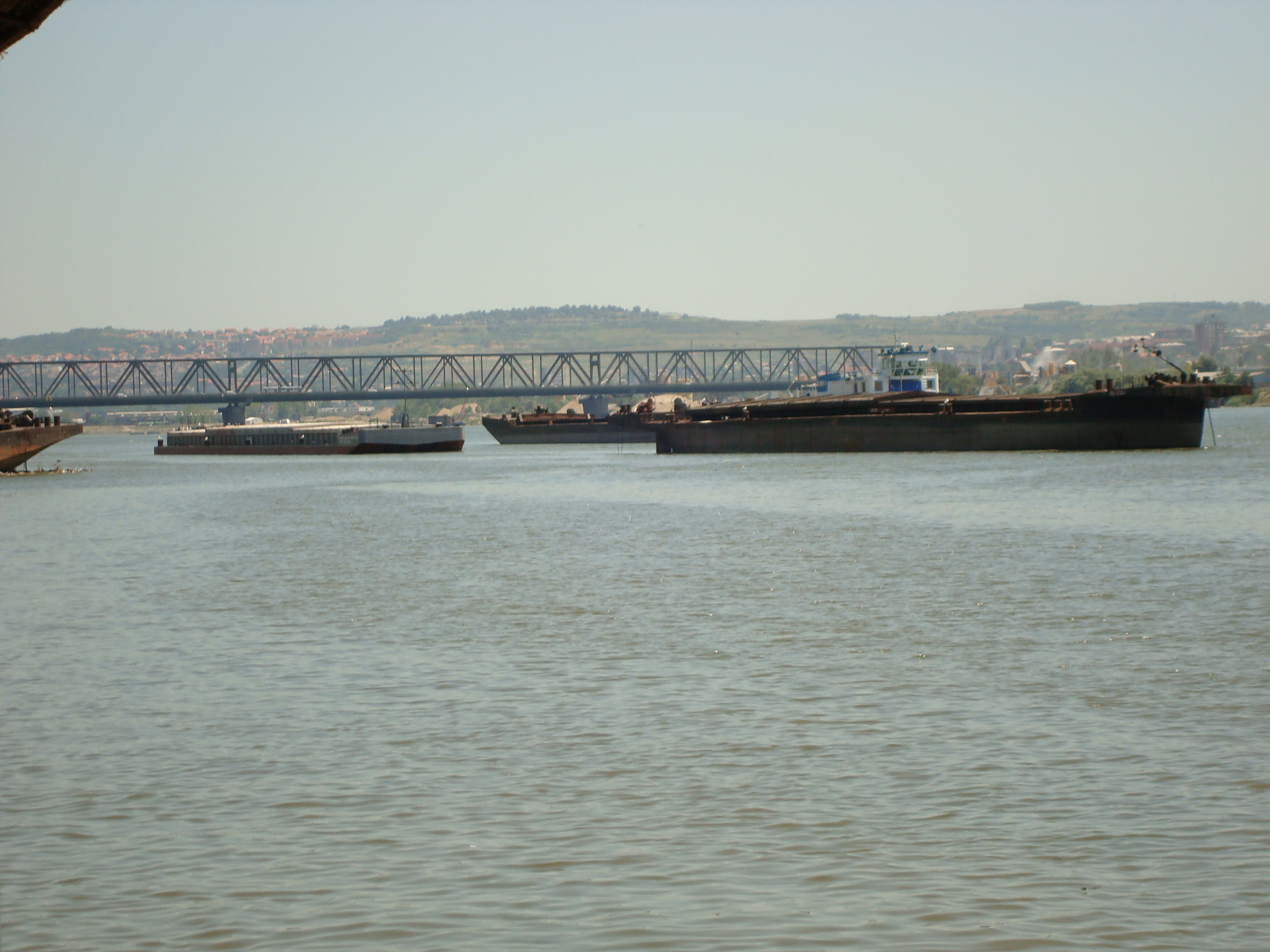
A view of the bridge from the Danube

However, as of December 2012, only the works on the Zemun-Borča Bridge have begun, which was finished in 2014 and renamed the Pupin Bridge. Reconstruction of Pančevo Bridge has been scheduled and postponed several times since 2006. So far, it as only been announced how the reconstruction will be handled. It is supposed to last for 12 months. The rail traffic will be closed during that time. "Beovoz" would stop on the approaches to the bridge and buses would take passengers to the other side. But the bridge will never be fully closed to road traffic, because it would cut Belgrade's only connection across the Danube. Rail tracks will be temporary turned into traffic lanes, which would mean the bridge will have six lanes in this period and two will always be closed for reconstruction. Freight traffic will be allowed only at night.

The Transportation Institute CIP drafted the reconstruction project in 2006, which was adopted in 2007. The bridge was partially renovated in 2008–2010. The main steel grid-like construction beneath the carriageways was repaired, while some parts were replaced or strengthened. The main girders were sandblasted and painted. Since then, commuters (drivers, cyclists, pedestrians) posted numerous photos of neglect and abundant damages of the bridge. In 2014, the cyclists hanged a large placard, pointing to the bad shape of the paths and guard rails, general neglect of the bridge and abundant weeds growing on it. In November 2017 the state road company posted a warning and a protective tape on the bridge, alarming the commuters on caution because of the "chipping off of the bridge construction". The company later clarified that only parts of the concrete parapet were cracking, which is a "damage of aesthetic nature".

In December 2017, Minister for transportation Zorana Mihajlović announced the complete reconstruction of the bridge, without giving the starting date but setting the deadline for the finished works at the end of 2018. The carriageways will be repaired, the bridge will be protected from corrosion and the decorative lights will be posted. It is not known whether the project from 2008 can still be used due to the passed time and further deterioration of the bridge since then. Also, she announced that the illegal gravel facilities in the vicinity of the bridge will be dislocated. It is estimated that the entire project would cost 3.5 billion dinars (€30 million). Confronted later with her claims, minister Mihajlović denied ever saying that, even though she was filmed, saying that she was talking only about the bicycle paths, which didn't happen either.

However, the deputy mayor Goran Vesić said in July 2018 that the reconstruction of the bridge can't be done until the new bridge over the Danube, across the Ada Huja is finished. Vesić stated that the construction of this bridge should start in 2020, which was later moved to 2021, meaning it can't be finished before 2024. But the traffic incidents on the bridge continued, especially regarding bridge fences, which are not proper, motor traffic fences, which are metallic, firm and capable of bouncing back a car going at 80 km/h (50 mph). Instead they are much weaker, pedestrian ones and are, additionally, rusty and covered in the overgrowth of weeds. In 2013, a truck broke the bridge fence, falling down in the yard of the construction company, but without fatalities. In the winter of 2017, parts of the bridge construction fell down, not hurting anyone. In October 2018 a car broke the fence and fell down, killing father and daughter inside the car. In August 2019 another car broke the fence, but without fatalities. Still, the authorities refuse to place even the proper fences, waiting for the full reconstruction and claiming that the current maintenance works are adequate.

=== 2020s ===
In January 2021, the city administration announced a study to show if it is feasible to expand the bridge with an additional lane, to carry the first tram line across the Danube. In August 2021, Zoran Drobnjak, head of the national road construction company Putevi Srbije, said that the bridge is too old and that the existing structure should be completely demolished. A new one should be placed instead, he said, but added that it should be done in 2024 or 2025, after the Ada Huja bridge is finished. Engineer and bridge designer Ljuba Kostić responded that this was a terrible idea. If needed, there are techniques for steel construction enhancement and the strengthening of the pillars, while the new piles can be placed, according to Kostić; this would allow for the expansion of the bridge with additional lanes.

In September 2021, chief city urbanist Marko Stojčić said that construction of the new bridge would be cheaper than repairing the old one, though he favors the reconstruction, but that bridge is ultimately operated by the Putevi Srbije, and that its future will be decided in 2022. Drobnjak continued to push the demolition, claiming the bridge was damaged to its foundations, but the engineers, including the CIP institute, rejected it. Drobnjak announced construction of the new, previously non-mentioned bridge, in the vicinity of the Pančevo Bridge, He didn't specify anything about it (timeline, characteristics, location), but already set a price of €200 million without giving an estimate of the reconstruction worth. When this bridge is finished, the old one will be demolished and rebuilt.

Kostić accused Drobnjak of upsetting the public by claiming that bridge was damaged to its foundations. He added that 1965–1966 reconstruction showed the pillars are capable of bearing two constructions at the same time. He also added that the access ramps to the bridge are in worse shape and bigger problem that the bridge itself, and accused authorities of deliberately not embellishing the bridge (decorative lights, new paint, etc.) like they do with other Belgrade bridges, so the Pančevo Bridge appears to be in worse shape than it is. The "Putevi Srbije" refused to disclose on what they estimated that bridge is damaged that much, but in September 2021 indefinitely banned vehicles with total weight of over 12 tons to cross the bridge, citing the bad shape of the access paths from the right side.

Accidents with fence breaking continued to happen, including those with fatalities, like in May 2022. By this time, cracking of the pedestrian pathways created gaping holes. State road inspector ordered for the pathways to be repaired "without any delay", but "Putevi Srbije" refused to do so, claiming that it would cause traffic jams and anger of the commuters.

== Technical characteristics ==
The original bridge was built by a group of large German steel producers supplying the steel and by Siemens-Bauunion GmbH from Berlin doing all other works such as the piers for the bridge. The work of these companies was part of the reparations Germany had to pay to Serbia for the damage inflicted during World War I.

In 1946, the bridge was originally intended to be just a railway bridge but later it was opened for road traffic, too. Today, it has two lanes in both directions for road traffic, and even though it was designed to have two rail tracks as well, at the moment there is only one rail track on the bridge.

Total length of the steel bridge is 1,526.4 meters, of which 1,134,7 meters is over the river bed. The height of the main supporting piers is 18 meters.

== Importance ==
Due to being the only bridge over the Danube in Belgrade for a long time, the bridge became very congested. At its peak Pančevo Bridge had between 150,000 and 200,000 vehicles crossing it daily. At the time when the bridge was rebuilt in 1946 (as of 1948 census), Pančevački Rit (section of Belgrade across the Danube) had a population of 7,998 inhabitants, Pančevo had 26,423 inhabitants and Belgrade itself had 388,246 inhabitants. As of 2011 census, Pančevo had 76,203 inhabitants (2.88 times higher) and Belgrade has 1,233,796 inhabitants (3.18 times higher). Also, number of motor vehicles between these two periods increased in much higher rate.

After crossing into Krnjača, the bridge continues as a road that splits in two directions:

- Pančevo road, 16 kilometers to the east, which leads to the industrial town of Pančevo (after which both the bridge and the road are named) in the province of Vojvodina.
- Zrenjanin road, 77 kilometers to the north, which leads to the town of Zrenjanin, also in Vojvodina.

There are railway stations, "Pančevački most" on the Belgrade side of the bridge, and "Krnjača", on the Krnjača side. Both stations are part of Beovoz commuter rail which connects the area between the town of Stara Pazova in Syrmia region of Vojvodina, Belgrade and Pančevo as this entire area forms a greater metropolitan area of Belgrade.

Marking the 75th anniversary of the bridge's 1946 reconstruction, Serbian national post office service Pošta Srbije issued two postage stamps with the image of the bridge. Designed by Anamari Banjac, the stamps were issued on 29 April 2021, in total circulation of 25,000.

== See also ==
- List of bridges in Serbia
- List of crossings of the Danube
- List of road–rail bridges
