= Zemun Polje =

Zemun Polje Земун поље
- Urban neighbourhood
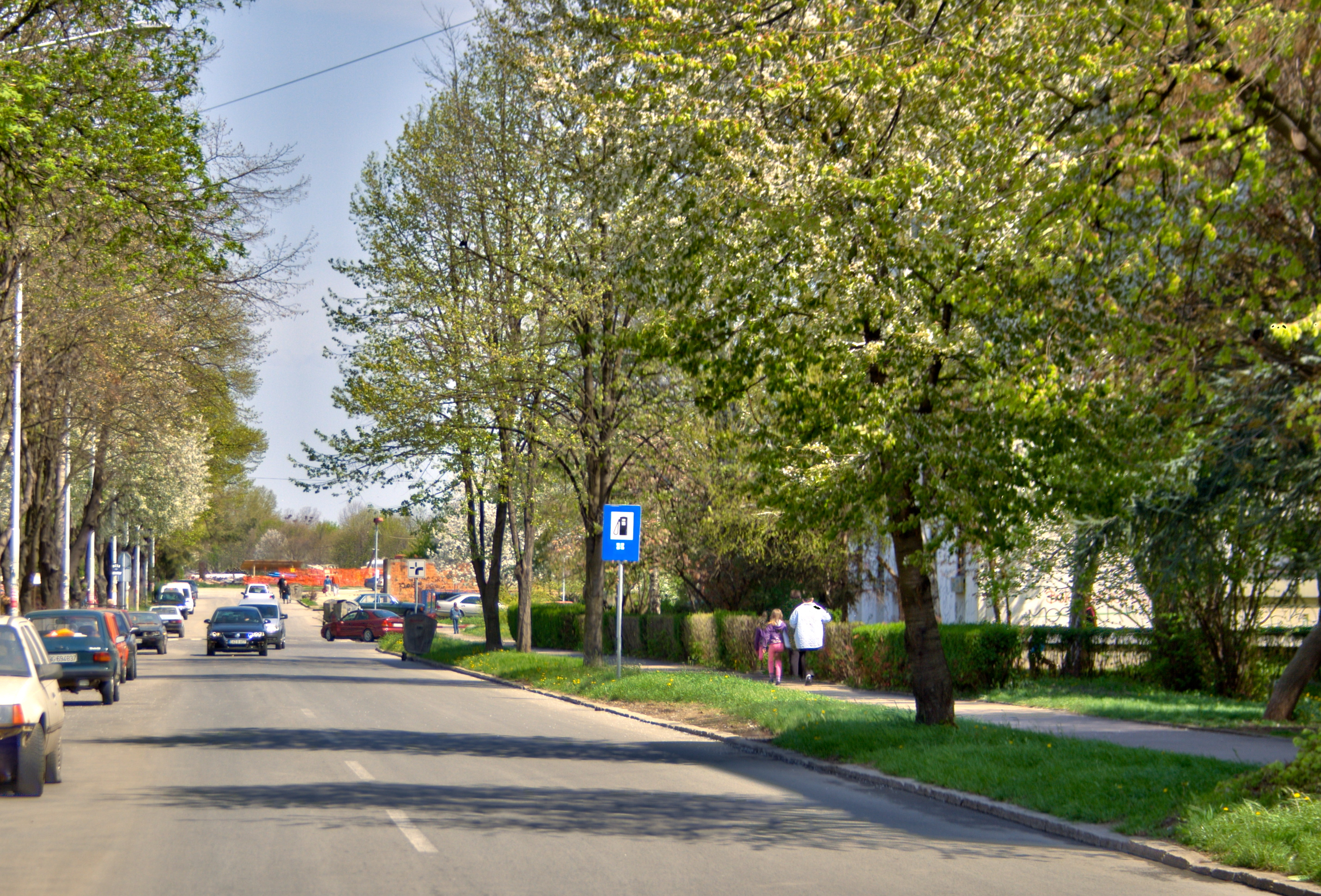
- Bertrand Russell street in Zemun Polje

- Location within Belgrade
- Coordinates: 44°52′N 20°19′E
- Country: Serbia
- Region: Belgrade
- Municipality: Zemun

Area
  - Total: 29.91 km^{2} (11.55 sq mi)

Population (2011)
  - Total: 17,391
  - Density: 581.4/km^{2} (1,506/sq mi)
- Time zone: UTC+1 (CET)
  - Summer (DST): UTC+2 (CEST)
- Area code: +381(0)11
- Car plates: BG

Zemun Polje (Serbian: Земун поље) is an urban neighborhood of Belgrade, the capital of Serbia. It is located in the municipality of Zemun.

== Location ==
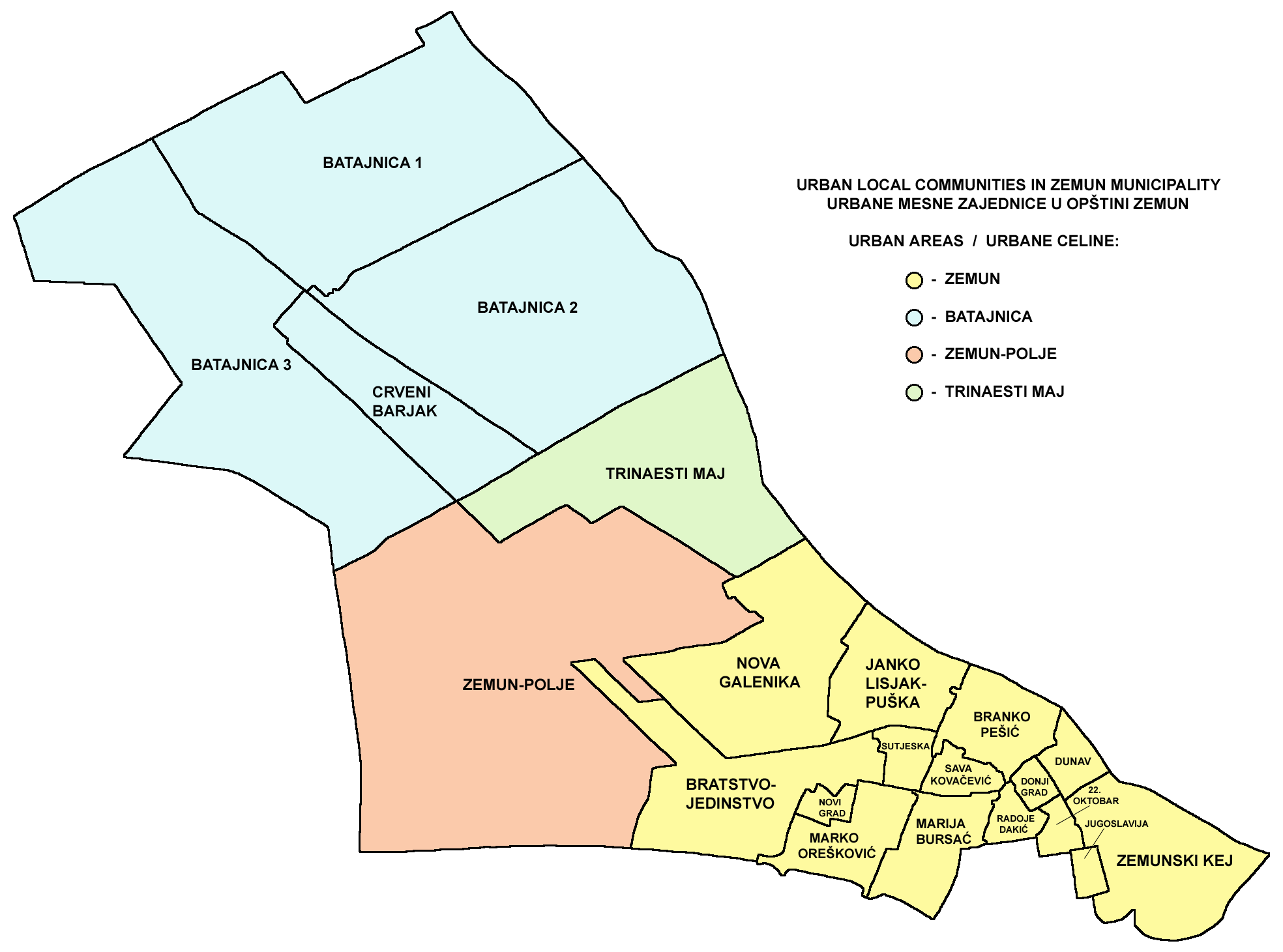
Map of Urban local communities in Zemun municipality

Zemun Polje is located on both railway and highway Belgrade-Novi Sad, halfway between the western section of urban Zemun (Nova Galenika) and Batajnica. For decades completely outside the urban section of Belgrade, since the late 1990s it made urban connection with the extended industrial zone of Nova Galenika on the east (through the neighborhood of Kamendin and the fast developing neighborhood of Plavi Horizonti on the south.

== Characteristics ==
Despite even originally being built outside the urban zone of Belgrade (in the 1970s, even the name, Zemun Polje, means Zemun field) it was intended as a neighborhood of Belgrade, not as a separate settlement. The neighborhood of Kamendin was built in the late 1990s, directly adjoining the western section of Zemun Polje.

The geometrically shaped neighborhood is mostly residential, with its own railway station in the south. The Corn Institute Zemun Polje has a worldwide reputation in creating corn hybrids.

In August 2023, the Serbian national postal office service, Pošta Srbije, announced construction of massive logistics center in Zemun Polje. It will include large storage spaces, cold storages, and duty-free zone as the 23 ha (57 acres) large parcel reaches the Danube. The complex should be finished by 2033.

== Population ==
Historical population
Year	Pop.	±%
1981	10,755	—
1991	11,761	+9.4%
2002	12,901	+9.7%
2011	17,391	+34.8%

The local community (mesna zajednica, municipal sub-administrative unit) had a population of 17,391 in 2011.

== Sub-neighborhoods ==
=== Školsko Dobro ===
Školsko Dobro is the oldest section of Zemun Polje located in its south-west extension. It consists of pavilions with some estimated 500 inhabitants in 2013. The settlement developed in 1949 for the employees of the Corn Institute. It was only in the early 2000s that some of the communal infrastructure was introduced, like the pavement, street lights and sewerage. The name literally means “School Property” in Serbian.

In 1963, a tractor which was plowing the land in the vicinity of Školsko Dobro's central building began digging up on the surface the old coins, head of a sculpture, pottery pieces and numerous other objects. The National Museum in Zemun was notified and archaeologists examined the site. It was concluded that it was a Roman fort on the former Sirmium-Singidunum road. Previously unknown settlement was squarely shaped with the sides of 3 km (1.9 mi) and, at the time of discovery, was the largest known "outer suburb" of Roman Singidunum.
