= Railway bridge (disambiguation) =

A railway bridge is a bridge designed to carry trains.

Railway bridge may also refer to:

- Railway Bridge, Kaunas, crossing the Nemunas River in Lithuania
- Railway Bridge, Riga, crossing the Daugava river in Riga, Latvia
- New Railway Bridge, crossing the Sava river in Belgrade, Serbia
- Old Railway Bridge, crossing the Sava river in Belgrade, Serbia

== See also ==
- List of railway bridges and viaducts
- International Railroad Bridge (disambiguation)
- Railway viaduct
