= Transport in Belgrade =

Overview of the Belgrade transit systems

This article deals with the system of transport in Belgrade, both public and private.

== Urban ==
Belgrade has an extensive public transport system, which consists of buses, trams, trolley buses and trains operated by the city-owned GSP Belgrade and several private companies. All companies participate in Integrated Tariff System (ITS), which makes tickets transferable between companies and vehicle types. Tickets can be purchased in numerous kiosks or from the driver. They must be validated inside the vehicle and are valid for one ride only. On February 1, 2012, BusPlus, a modern electronic system for managing vehicles and transportation tickets in public transport was introduced, a system based on a vague contract which does not explicitly state the profit made by Apex Technology Solutions, and the giveaway of advertising space on bus stations. It was replaced by a new payment system called Beograd plus in 2023, and the payment systems were entirely discontinued since January 1, 2025, making Belgrade the biggest city in Europe to use free public transport.

=== Buses ===
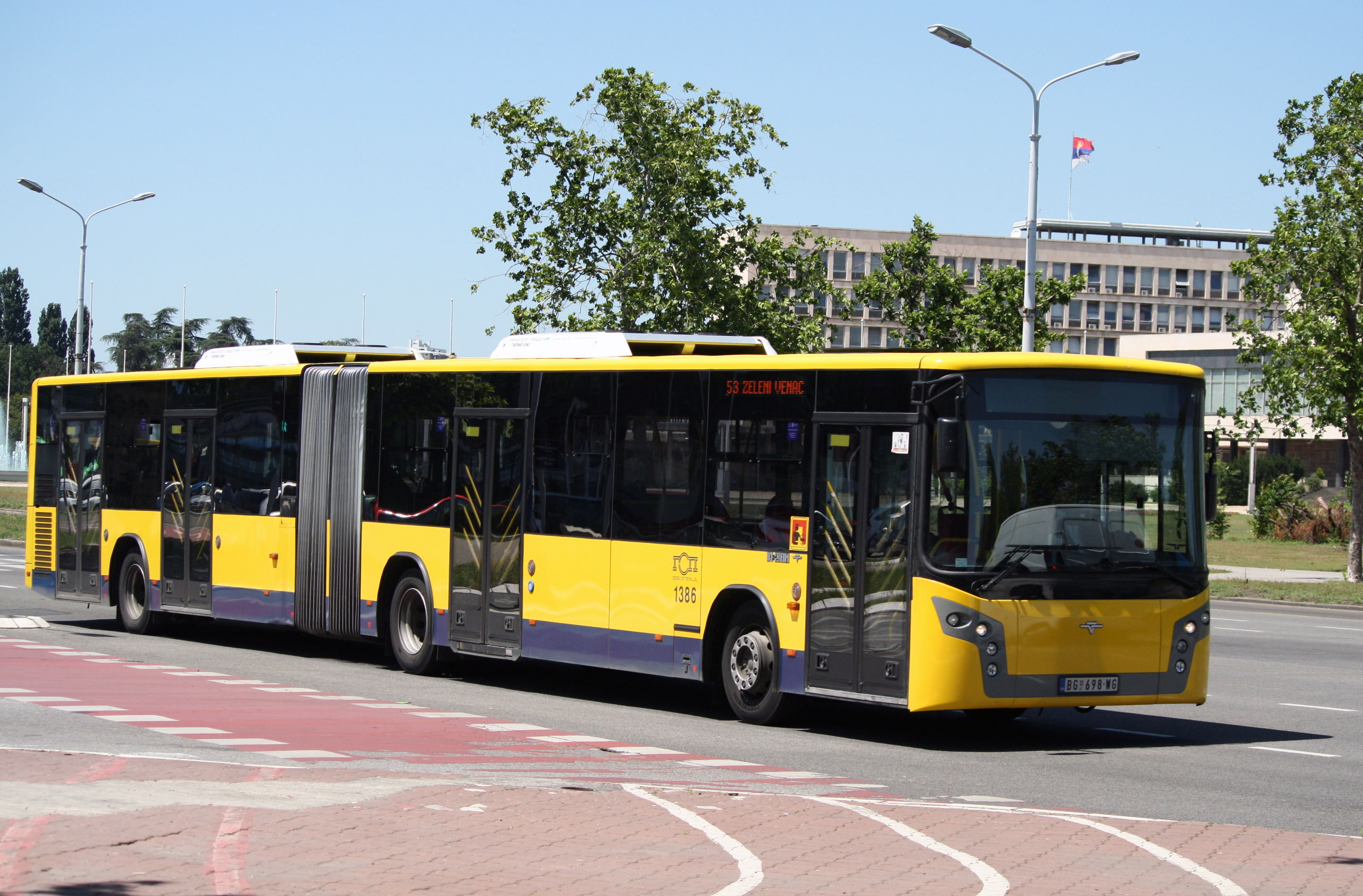
Ikarbus Bus in Belgrade

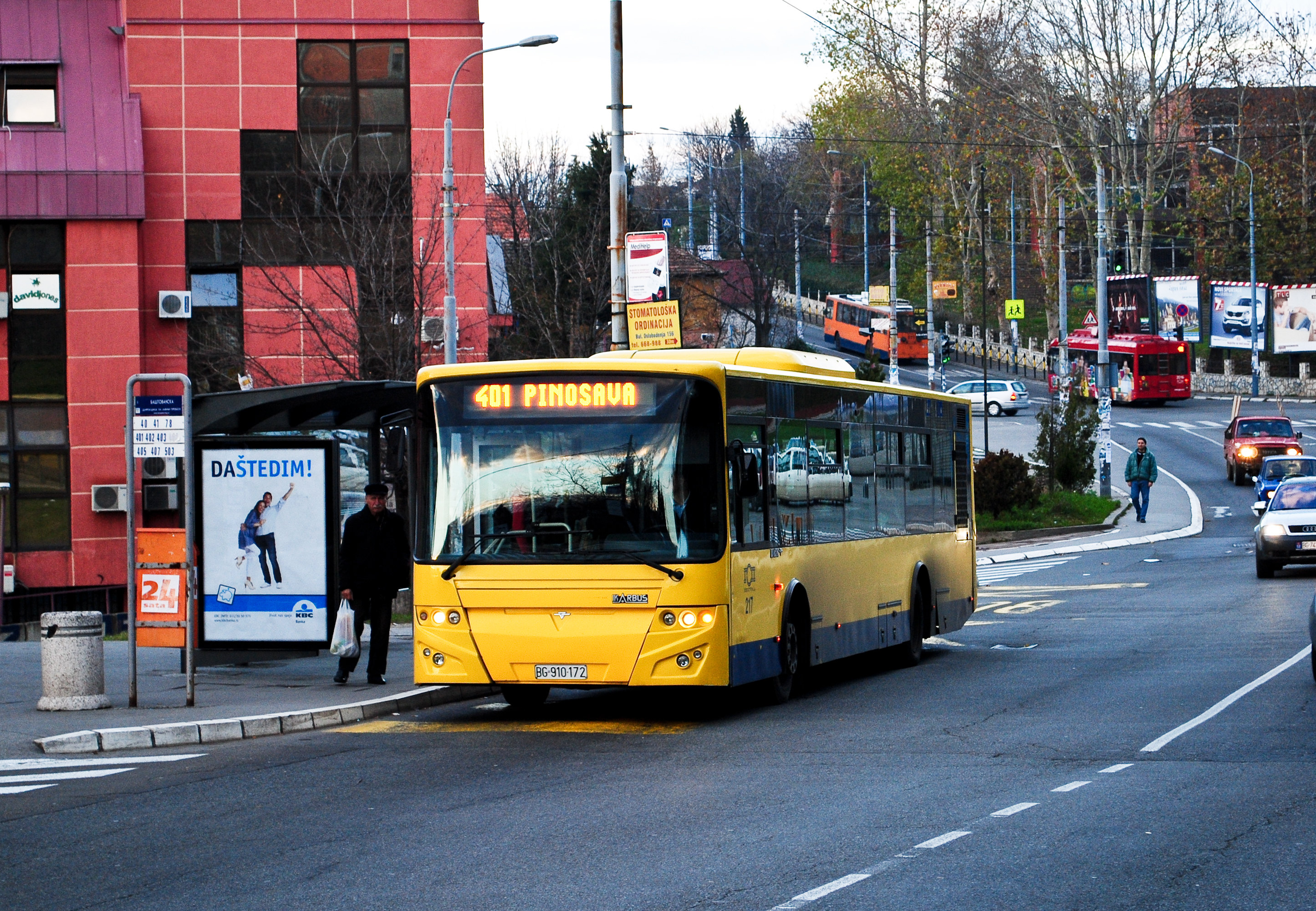
Ikarbus with trolleybuses in the background, Belgrade

The main Belgrade Bus Station is located at Železnička 4, which is closed since 29 September 2024, and currently being demolished. It was replaced with a new bus station in New Belgrade.

City public bus transportation is operated by 4 main carriers:

- Gradsko saobraćajno preduzeće Beograd (GSP) – city-owned company
- Saobraćajno preduzeće Lasta
- GP-NP "MobiLitas" (consortium of private transporters).
- ASP Strela Obrenovac
- Arriva LUV
- Poslovno udruženje Beobus
- Tamnava trans
- Domiko

Excluding electric buses, minibuses and seasonal lines, there are 223 regular lines and 23 night lines. Night lines are 15, 18, 26, 27, 29, 31, 32, 33, 37, 47, 51, 56, 72, 95, 101, 105, 202, 302, 304, 307, 401, 405, 511, 601, 603, 706, 707.

Night lines that are abolished are: 7, 9, 11, 48, 68, 75, 96, 301, 308, 701, 704.

Each of the regular lines is operated by GSP and by one of the other carriers. Since November 27 all night routes are operated by GSP Beograd.

Private carriers were introduced in 1990s after many strikes in GSP, which had the monopoly till then. There were many unsuccessful efforts by the city after 2000 to unify them into the same ticket system. Finally, in 2004 it was agreed that ITS (integrated tariff system) will be introduced. These 6 companies will carry the public transportation till 2012, when the City Government will decide whether GSP is going to remain the only transport company.

==== Regular bus lines ====
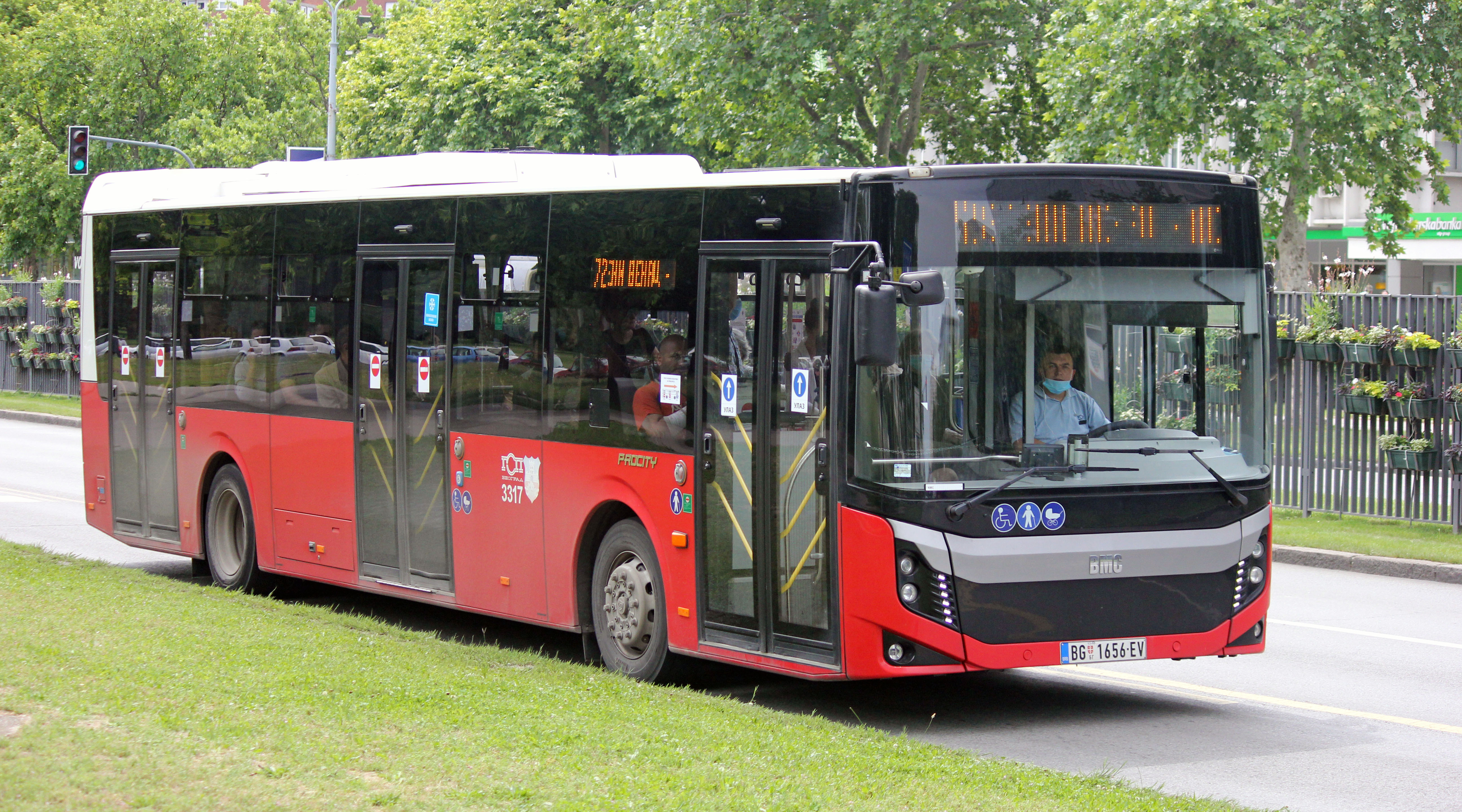
Line 72 connects the city centre to Belgrade Nikola Tesla Airport

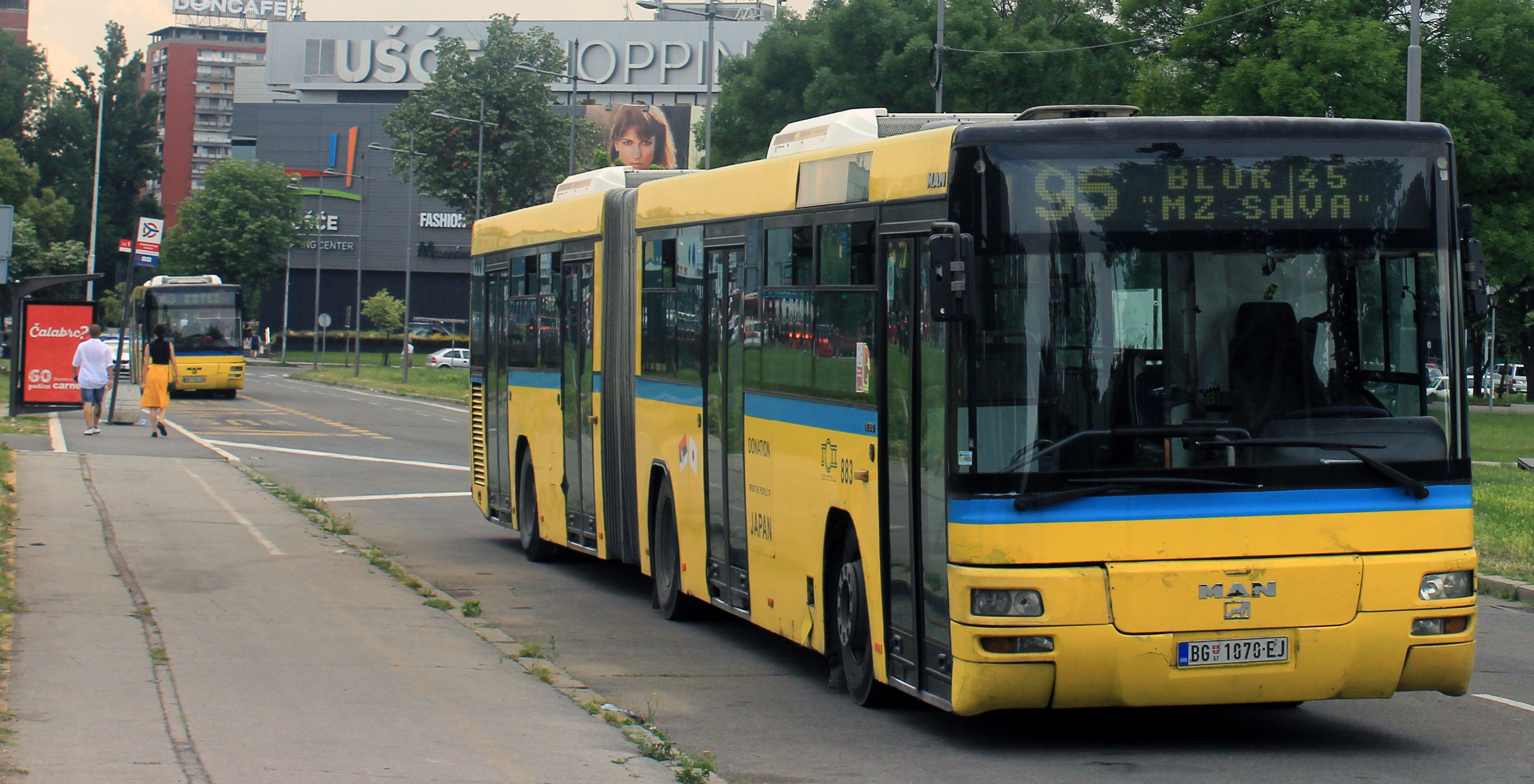
Going across all three banks of Belgrade, line 95 is the longest one in the city proper

The lines are usually denoted by their number, but sometimes letters are added as a designation. Lines serving the city have numbers up to 100, while lines reaching the suburbs or exclusively serving those are indicated by numbers over 100. Line 95 is the longest line in the city proper: connecting Borča to Block 45, it goes across the Danube via Pančevo Bridge and across the Sava via Branko's Bridge. Line 583, which reaches to the village of Trbušnica is the longest in the city's metropolitan area. Line 95 is more than 20 kilometres long, while line 583 stretches on for 73 kilometres. In contrast, line 66 is the shortest one, at just 700 metres (2,300 ft).

- 2A - Dorćol (SRC ″Milan Muškatirović″) - Beograd na vodi
- 3A - Beograd na vodi - Kneževac
- 9A - Slavija - Blok 72 (TC Euroazija)
- 15 – Zeleni venac – Zemun (Novi grad)
- 16 – Karaburma 2 – New Belgrade (Paviljoni)
- 17 – Konjarnik – Zemun (Gornji grad)
- 18 – Medaković 3 – Zemun (Bačka street)
- 20 – Mirijevo 3 – Veliki Mokri Lug
- 23 – Karaburma 2 – Vidikovac
- 24 – Dorćol (SRC ″Milan Muškatirović″) – Neimar
- 25 – Karaburma 2 – Kumodraž 2
- 25P – Mirijevo 4 – Kumodraž /Stepina kuća/
- 26 – Dorćol (Dunavska street) – Braće Jerković
- 26L - Medaković 3 - Vojvode Vlahovića /Terminus/
- 27 – Trg Republike – Mirijevo 3
- 27E – Blok 20 – Mirijevo 4
- 30 – Slavija (Birčaninova street) – Medaković 2
- 31 – Studentski trg – Konjarnik
- 32 – Vukov spomenik – Višnjica
- 32E – Trg Republike – Višnjica
- 33 – Pančevački most (Railway station) – Kumodraž
- 34 – Topčidersko brdo (Senjak) - Železnička stanica ”Beograd Centar” – Ul. Pere Velimirovića
- 35 – Blok 20 – Lešće (Groblje)
- 36 – Železnička stanica ″Beograd centar″ – Trg Slavija – Savski trg – Železnička stanica ″Beograd centar″ (In the inner circle traffic via TC Galerija.)
- 37 – Pančevački most (Railway station) – Kneževac
- 38 – Šumice – Milošev kladenac - Veliki mokri lug
- 38L - Železnička stanica "Beograd centar" - Pogon "Kosmaj"
- 39 – Slavija (Birčaninova street) – Kumodraž 1
- 42 – Slavija – Banjica (VMA) – Petlovo brdo
- 43 – Trg Republike – Kotež
- 44 – Topčidersko brdo (Senjak) – Viline vode – Dunav Stanica
- 45 – Zemun (Novi grad) – Blok 44
- 46 – Belgrade Waterfront – Mirijevo
- 47 – Slavija (Birčaninova street) – Resnik (Railway station)
- 48 – Pančevački most (Railway station) – Miljakovac 3
- 49 – Banovo Brdo – Naselje Stepa Stepanović
- 50 – Ustanička – Banovo brdo
- 51 – Belgrade Waterfront – Bele vode
- 52 – Zeleni venac – Cerak vinogradi
- 53 – Zeleni venac – Vidikovac
- 54 – Miljakovac 1 – Železnik – MZ Makiš
- 55 – Zvezdara (Pijaca) – Stari Železnik
- 56 – Zeleni venac – Petlovo brdo
- 57 – Banovo brdo – Naselje "Golf" – Banovo brdo
- 58 – Pančevački most (Railway station) – Novi Železnik
- 59 – Slavija (Birčaninova street) – Petlovo brdo
- 60 – Zeleni venac – Toplana (New Belgrade)
- 64 - Zvezdara - Šumice
- 65 – Zvezdara 2 – Novo bežanijsko groblje
- 66 - Vukov spomenik - Naučno tehnološki park "Zvezdara"
- 67 – Zeleni venac – Block 70A (New Belgrade)
- 68 – Zeleni venac – Block 70 (New Belgrade)
- 70 – Bežanijska kosa – IKEA
- 71 – Zeleni venac – Bežanija (Ledine)
- 72 – Zeleni venac – Aerodrom „Nikola Tesla“ – LINE TO THE AIRPORT
- 73 – Block 45 (New Belgrade) – Batajnica (Railway station)
- 74 – Mirijevo 3 – Bežanijska kosa
- 75 – Zeleni venac – Bežanijska kosa
- 76 – Block 70A (New Belgrade) – Bežanijska kosa
- 77 – Zvezdara – Bežanijska kosa
- 78 – Banjica 2 – Zemun (Novi grad)
- 79 – Dorćol (SRC „Milan Muškatirović“) – Mirijevo 4
- 80 – Čukarička padina – IKEA
- 81 – New Belgrade (Pohorska street) – Ugrinovački put – Altina
- 81L – New Belgrade (Pohorska street) – Dobanovački put – Altina
- 82 – Zemun (Kej oslobođenja) – Bežanijsko groblje – Blok 44
- 83 – Crveni Krst – Zemun (Bačka)
- 84 – Zeleni venac – Nova Galenika
- 85 – Banovo brdo — Borča 3
- 87 – Čukarička padina – Banovo brdo – Čukarička padina
- 87A – Čukarička padina – Banovo brdo – Čukarička padina (The opposite direction of line 87.)
- 88 – Zemun (Kej oslobođenja) – Novi Železnik
- 89 – Vidikovac – Čukarička padina – Blok 72
- 91 – Belgrade Waterfront – Ostružnica (Novo naselje)
- 92 – Belgrade Waterfront – Ostružnica (Karaula)
- 94 – Block 45 (New Belgrade) – Resnik /Edvarda Griga/
- 95 – Block 45 (New Belgrade) – Borča 3
- 96 – Pančevački most (Railway station) – Borča 3
- 101 – Omladinski stadion – Padinska Skela. Lines 101 to 112 operate across Palilula, Belgrade's largest municipality that stretches across the Danube.
- 102 – Padinska skela – Vrbovski - Široka greda
- 102P – Padinska skela – Preliv
- 103 – Zemun /Bačka/ – Padinska Skela
- 104 – Omladinski stadion – Crvenka
- 105 – Omladinski stadion – Ovča /Železnička stanica/
- 105L – Zemun /Bačka/ – Ovča /Železnička stanica/
- 106 – Omladinski stadion – PKB Kovilovo – Jabučki rit
- 107 – Padinska skela – Dunavac
- 108 – Omladinski stadion – Reva (Duboka bara)
- 109 – Padinska skela – Put za Dunavac
- 110 – Padinska skela – Obala Tamiša
- 111 - Omladinski stadion - SC Kovilovo
- 112 – Zemun /Bačka/ – Reva (Duboka bara)
- 202 – Omladinski stadion – Veliko Selo
- 302 – Ustanička – Grocka – Begaljica
- 303 – Ustanička – Vrčin
- 304 – Ustanička – Ritopek
- 305 – Ustanička – Boleč
- 306 – Ustanička – Leštane – Bubanj Potok
- 307 – Ustanička – Vinča
- 308 – Šumice – Veliki Mokri Lug
- 309 – Zvezdara (Pijaca) – Kaluđerica
- 309L - Kaluđerica /Put za Institut/ - Kaluđerica /Višnjićeva/
- 310 – Šumice - Mali Mokri Lug
- 311 - Ustanička - Leštane /Ravan/
- 312 - MZ Veliki mokri lug - Cvetanova Ćuprija - Kumodraž - MZ Veliki mokri lug
- 313 - Mirijevo 4 - Leštane /Ravan/
- 350 - Živkovac - Dražanj - Brestovik - Kamendo - Živkovac. Lines 350 to 366A operate across the municipality of Grocka, connecting its largely rural settlements with both each other and the urban neighborhood of Šumice.
- 351 - Šumice - Grocka - Dražanj
- 352 - Šumice - Dražanj
- 353 - Dražanj - Živkovac - Šumice
- 354 - Šumice - Vrčin - Zaklopača - Grocka - Kamendo
- 354A - Živkovac - Grocka - Zaklopača - Vrčin - Šumice
- 354B - Šumice - Vrčin - Zaklopača - Grocka
- 355 - Šumice - Grocka - Kamendo - Dražanj
- 355A - Šumice - Živkovac - Dražanj
- 355B - Šumice - Grocka - Brestovik - Kamendo - Dražanj
- 355L - Šumice - Kamendo - Umčari
- 356 - Šumice - Grocka - Brestovik - Pudarci
- 361B - Šumice - Živkovac - Dražanj
- 361L - Grocka - Dražanj
- 362 - Živkovac - Šumice
- 363 - Šumice - Grocka - Živkovac
- 363L - Živkovac - Kamendo - Grocka
- 365 - Grocka - Umčari - Mladenovac
- 366 - Šumice - Umčari - Kamendo
- 366A - Kamendo - Umčari - Šumice (a reverse version of 366, which only goes one way)
- 401 – Slavija /Birčaninova/ – Pinosava
- 402 – Slavija /Birčaninova/ – Beli Potok
- 403 – Voždovac – Zuce
- 404 – Bela Reka - Ripanj – Trešnja (Okretnica)
- 405 – Voždovac – Glumčevo brdo
- 405L – Glumčevo brdo - Nenadovac - Barajevo - Karaula - Glumčevo brdo
- 406 – Voždovac – Institut "Jaroslav Černi"
- 406L – Voždovac – Zemljoradinička street – Beli Potok (Railway station)
- 407 – Voždovac – Bela Reka
- 407L - Bela Reka - Timočki put - Stara Lipovica - Trebež
- 408 – Voždovac – Ralja (Drumine)
- 409 - Voždovac - Torlački vis - Jajinci (Ulica Ruža) - Voždovac
- 501 - Petlovo brdo - Staro Kijevo
- 502 - Miljakovac 1 - Orlovača /groblje/ (In the opposite direction it goes via Kanarevo brdo Health Centre)
- 503 – Voždovac – Resnik (Railway station)
- 504 – Resnik (Railway station) - Vidikovac
- 505 - Miljakovac 1 - Miljakovačke livade
- 506 - Miljakovac 1 - Miljakovačke staze - Rakovački potok - Resnik /Edvarda Griga/ - Resnik /Patin Majdan/
- 507 - Kneževac - Josipa Telarevića - Rušanj /Drobnjački kraj/
- 511 – Belgrade Waterfront – Sremčica
- 512 – Banovo brdo – Sremčica (Naselje Gorica)
- 513 – Sremčica (Naselje Gorica) - Velika Moštanica (centar)
- 521 – Vidikovac – Bora Kečić - Železnik /Taraiš/
- 522 – Novi Železnik - Milorada Ćirića - Novi Železnik
- 531 – Banovo brdo – Rušanj (13. septembra)
- 532 – Banovo brdo – Rušanj (Ul. oslobođenja)
- 533 – Banovo brdo – Orlovača (Groblje)
- 534 – Cerak vinogradi – Ripanj (Centar)
- 551 – Belgrade Waterfront – Velika Moštanica
- 553 – Belgrade Waterfront – Rucka
- 601 – Beograd na vodi – Surčin
- 602 – Block 44 (New Belgrade) – SRC „Surčin“
- 603 – Bežanija (Ledine) – Ugrinovci
- 604 – Block 45 (New Belgrade) – Preka kaldrma
- 605 – Block 45 (New Belgrade) – Boljevci – Progar
- 606 – Surčin – Grmovac
- 607 – Banovo brdo – Aerodrom "Nikola Tesla"
- 610 – Zemun (Kej oslobođenja) – Jakovo
- 611 – Zemun (Kej oslobođenja) – Dobanovci
- 612 – Blok 20 – Kvantaška pijaca – Nova Galenika
- 613 – New Belgrade (Pohorska street) – Radiofar
- 700 – Batajnica (Railway station) - Batajnica (Railway station)
- 702 – Batajnica (Railway station) – Busije
- 703 – Zemun (Kej oslobođenja) - Batajnica (Railway station) – Ugrinovci
- 704 – Zeleni venac – Zemun polje
- 705 – Zemun (Kej oslobođenja) – „13. maj“
- 706 – Zeleni venac – Batajnica
- 706E – Zemun (Kej oslobođenja) – Batajnica
- 707 – Zeleni venac – Altina – Zemun polje
- 708 – Block 70A (New Belgrade) – Zemun polje
- 709 – Zemun (Novi grad) – Zemun polje
- 711 – New Belgrade (Pohorska street) – Ugrinovci

==== Electric buses ====
A transit diagram of electric buses

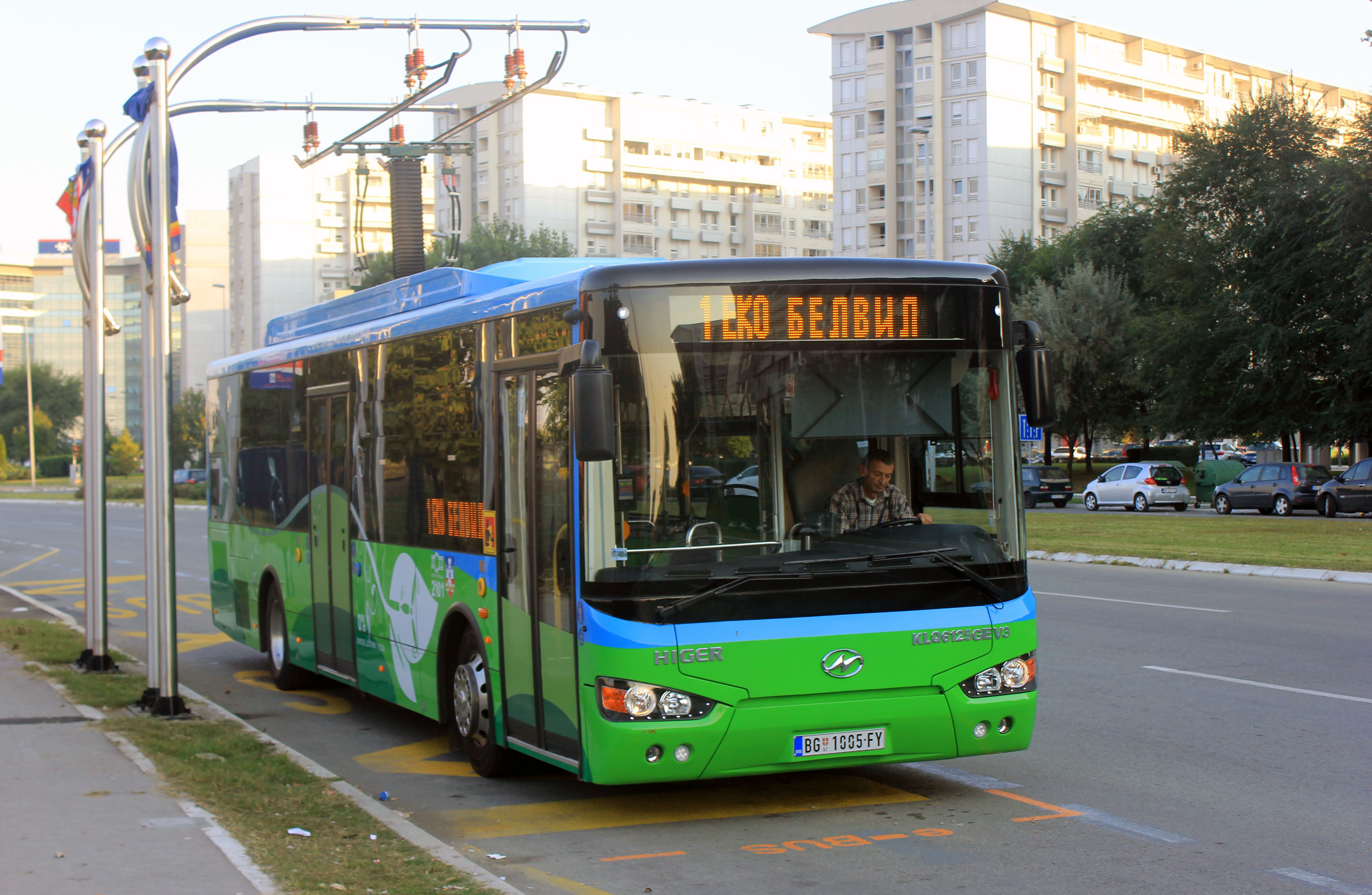
Higer's EKO 1 bus near Belville

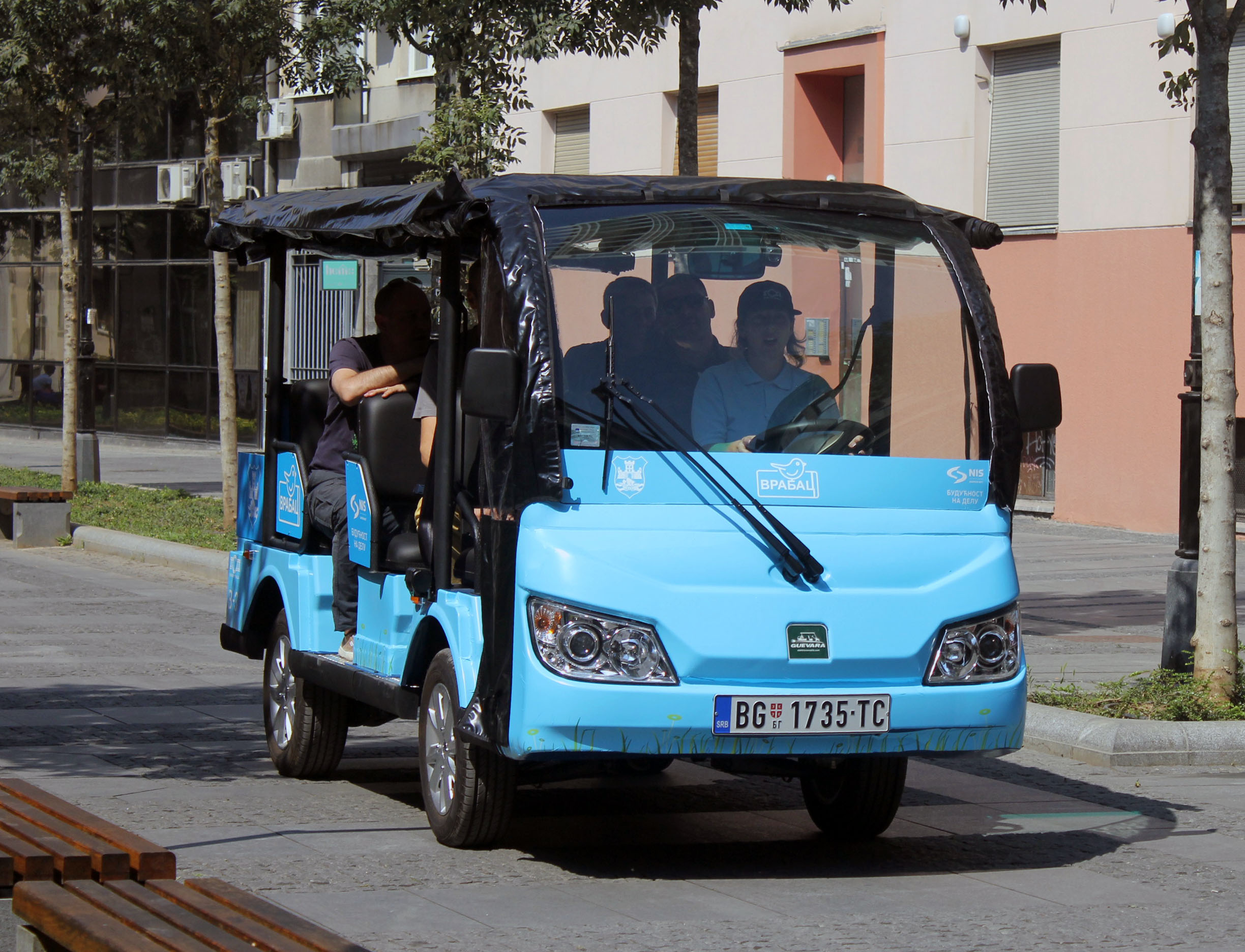
"Vrabac" bus on the Obilićev venac

There are two electric "EKO" bus lines in Belgrade, served by vehicles produced together by the Israeli-Bulgarian Chariot Motors and Chinese Higer Bus Company and Aowei Technology. Those are painted with a distinctive green color and are recharged in 10 minutes at the termini. The first buses entered service on 1 September 2016.

- EKO 1 – Vukov spomenik – Naselje Belville. It was the first electric bus line introduced, crossing the Sava River via Branko's Bridge.
- EKO 2 – Dorćol /SRC Milan Gale Muškatirović/ – Beograd na vodi. The line was introduced on 24 January 2022.

In addition to those, there is the VRABAC (Serbian: vrabac, meaning "sparrow") line of electric minibuses serving the pedestrian streets in the centre of Belgrade. Those are free to passengers and painted with a blue color. The line is circular and has eight stops, going from Obilićev venac to Studentski trg, then Kosančićev venac and back to Obilićev venac.

==== Seasonal buses ====
In addition to regular lines, six seasonal ones exist. Five of them, operating under the names ADA-1 through ADA-5, provide public transport to Ada Ciganlija, known as the Belgrade's sea. Those begin working on the last Saturday of June. The sixth one, line 400, goes from Voždovac to the peak of the Avala Mountain. It starts operation on May 1. All six lines work until September 1.

- ADA 1 – Trg republike – Ada Ciganlija – Vidikovac
- ADA 2 – Zemun /Kej oslobođenja/ – Ada Ciganlija
- ADA 3 – Konjarnik – Ada Ciganlija
- ADA 4 – Mirijevo – Ada Ciganlija
- ADA 5 – Bežanijska kosa – Ada Ciganlija
- 400 – Voždovac – Vrh Avale

=== Tramways and trolleys ===
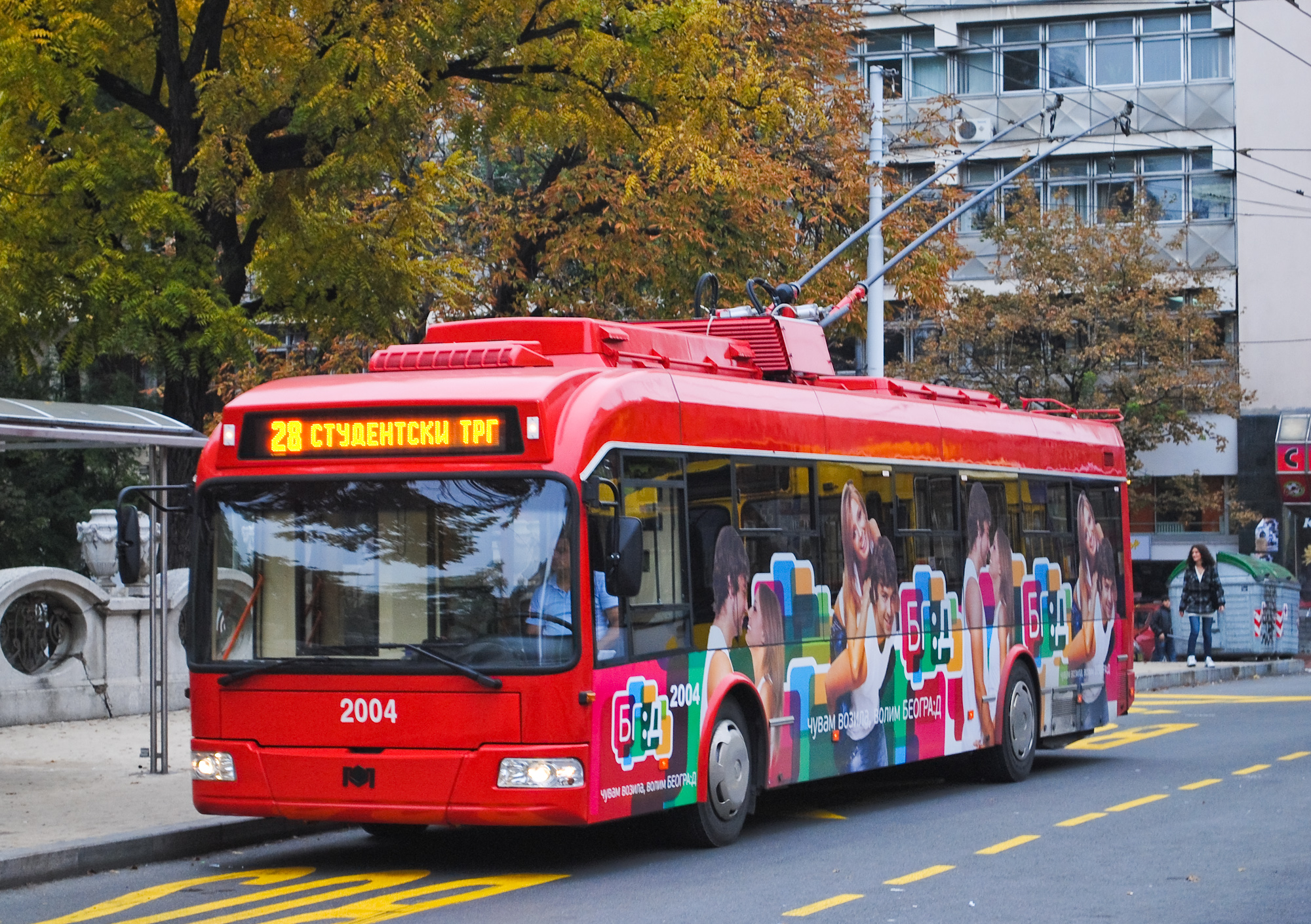
New Belkommunmash trolleybus for GSP

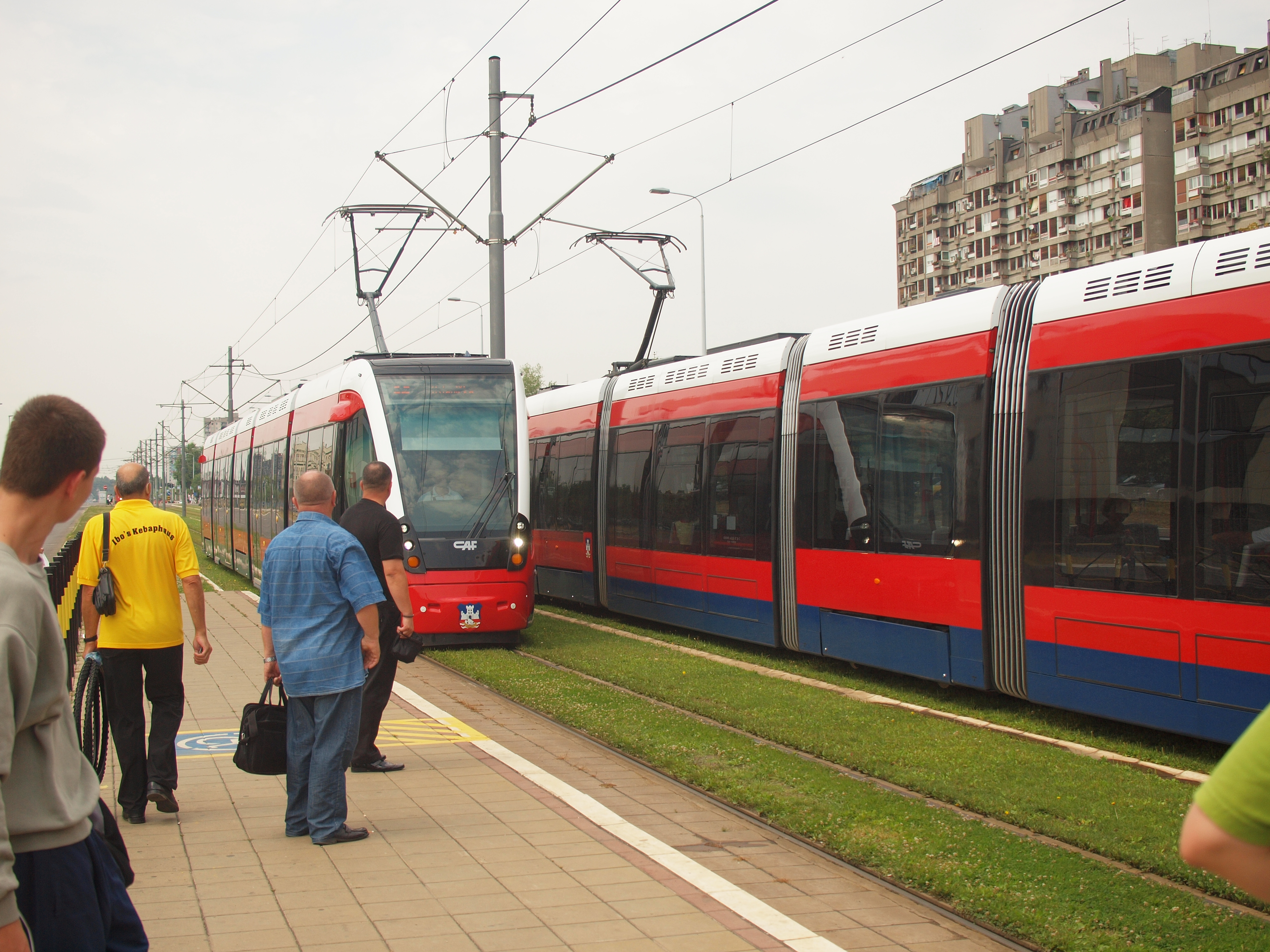
CAF Trams in Belgrade

The first tram line was introduced in 1892. The current extent of the network track has been unchanged since 1988, though with some re-routings of the tram lines. Trams and trolleys are operated exclusively by GSP Beograd. Trolleybuses are confined to the right bank, while the tram network reaches the left bank, too: lines 7, 9, 11 and 13 terminate at Block 45. Lines 7 and 9 use the Old Sava Bridge, while lines 11 and 13 go via the newer Ada Bridge.

==== Tram lines ====
Belgrade has 12 current trams (2, 3, 5, 6, 7, 8, 9, 10, 11, 12, 13 and 14). Tram line 2 (dva) is a circular line around the downtown, so often downtown is referred to as krug dvojke (the circle of line 2)

- 2 – Pristanište – Vukov spomenik – Pristanište
- 3 – Kneževac – Slavija – Omladinski stadion
- 5 – Kalemegdan (Donji grad) – Ustanička
- 6 – Tašmajdan – Ustanička
- 7 – Ustanička – Block 45 (New Belgrade)
- 8 - Omladinski stadion - Banjica
- 9 – Banjica – Block 45 (New Belgrade)
- 10 – Kalemegdan (Donji grad) – Banjica
- 11 – Kalemegdan (Donji grad) – Block 45 (New Belgrade)
- 12 – Banovo brdo – Omladinski stadion
- 13 – Banovo brdo – Block 45 (New Belgrade)
- 14 – Ustanička – Banjica

==== Tram network and termini ====
All the revenue service track is constructed as parallel double track with terminal loops. There are 8 revenue service loops in the system: Kneževac, Omladinski stadion, Kalemegdan, Ustanička, Tašmajdan, Block 45, Banjica, Banovo brdo. There are further 9 auxiliary loops: Pristanište, Slavija, Autokomanda, Trošarina, Radio industrija, Gospodarska mehana, Topčider, Railway station, Rakovica. Only the first three are actively used for cutting short during the schedule disruptions. The loops Slavija and Autokomanda are located in roundabouts and are normally used for the revenue thru-traffic. Other auxiliary loops are used only as alternatives during the closures. The last two loops (Rakovica and Railway Station) are defunct. The track at Rakovica is disconnected from the main line. The loop at Railway station was recently reconstructed but is completely out of use due to unworkable design. The circular line 2 does not use loops at its terminus at Pristanište. It makes the service stops on the main line instead.

==== Tram depots ====
There are 3 tram depots in Belgrade. Sava is the central active service depot built in New Belgrade in 1988. Dorćol ("Lower depot") is the historical electrical cars depot from 1894 which is used only for auxiliary and overhaul purposes. It is co-located with the active service trolleybus depot. The two single-track lines leading to it are the only exceptions to otherwise parallel double track network in the system and are not used in the revenue service. The third "Upper depot" is the historical horse-drawn cars depot from 1892. It retains its track but was recently disconnected from the main line. The depot is completely void of trams and is now housing only the overhead wiring maintenance unit. The plans to adapt it into the public transportation museum have never materialised.

==== Trolleybus lines ====
The first trolleybus line was introduced in 1947 to replace trams on the central corridor Kalemegdan-Slavija. The network extent is unchanged since late 1980s, though with minor relocation of the central terminus from Kalemegdan to Studentski trg in late 1990s. Belgrade has 7 current trolleybuses (19, 21, 22, 28, 29, 40 and 41).

- 19 – Trg Slavija – Konjarnik
- 21 – Trg Slavija – Učiteljsko naselje
- 22 – Trg Slavija – Kruševačka
- 28 – Studentski trg – Zvezdara
- 29 – Studentski trg – Medaković 3
- 40 – Zvezdara – Banjica 2
- 41 – Studentski trg – Banjica 2

==== Trolley network and termini ====
There are 4 revenue service terminal loops in the system: Studentski trg, Konjarnik, Banjica 2, Medaković 3. The peripheral termini Učiteljsko naselje, Kruševačka and Zvezdara have no purpose-built loops: the trolleybuses are circling around the city block instead. Additionally, there are 3 auxiliary loops in the system: Slavija, Crveni krst and Banjica 1. The auxiliary loops are actively used for cutting short during the schedule disruptions (the line number carries the suffix "L" on the departures to be cut short). Crveni krst and Banjica 1 can be used only in the direction towards the peripheral termini, Slavija can be used in both directions. Due to the insufficient number of correct trolleybuses on line 41, buses marked 41A are operated, and occasionally buses also appear on other lines.

=== Minibuses ===
In April 2007, six minibus lines were introduced (E1-E7, except E3) which criss-cross Belgrade. Minibuses are all air-conditioned, smaller and generally quicker than buses. However, tickets are bought inside a minibus and they are more expensive than ordinary ones – since minibuses are out of integrated tariff system. Minibus City Lines:

- A1.Slavija – Aerodrom „Nikola Tesla“ /Express/ – LINE TO THE AIRPORT
- E1.Ustanička – Blok 45
- E2.Trg Republike – Petlovo Brdo
- E6.Novi Beograd (Blok 45) – Mirijevo 4
- E9.Studentski trg – Kumodraž

Night Lines:

- 15N – Trg Republike – Zemun (Novi grad)
- 26N – Dorćol (Dunavska street) – Braće Jerković
- 27N – Trg Republike – Mirijevo 3
- 29N – Studentski trg – Medaković 3
- 31N – Studentski trg – Konjarnik
- 32N – Trg Republike – Višnjica
- 33N – Trg Republike – Kumodraž
- 37N – Trg Republike – Kneževac (line has shorter route of line 37)
- 47N – Trg Republike – Resnik (Railway station)
- 51N – Trg Republike – Bele Vode
- 56N – Trg Republike – Petlovo brdo – Rušanj
- 68N – Trg Republike – Block 45 (New Belgrade)
- 75N – Trg Republike – Bežanijska kosa
- 101N – Trg Republike – Padinska skela
- 202N – Trg Republike – Veliko selo
- 301N – Trg Republike – Begaljica
- 304N – Trg Republike – Veliki mokri lug - Ritopek
- 401N – Dorćol /garage/ – Pinosava
- 511N – Trg Republike – Sremčica
- 601N – Trg Slavija – Dobanovci
- 603N – Trg Republike – Ugrinovci
- 704N – Trg Republike – Nova Galenika – Zemun polje
- 706N – Trg Republike – Batajnica

=== Former lines ===
The following lines have ceased to exist; some of these have had their number reassigned:

- 1 – Kalemegdan – Kneževac
- 4 – Kalemegdan – Omladinski stadion
- 7N – Ustanička – Slavija – Block 45 (New Belgrade)
- 7L – Tašmajdan – Block 45 (New Belgrade)
- 8 – Omladinski stadion – Voždovac
- 9N – Banjica 2 – Block 45 (New Belgrade)
- 11N – Tašmajdan – Kalemegdan – Block 45 (New Belgrade)
- 22L – Studentski trg – Trg Slavija
- 27L – Vukov spomenik – Mirijevo
- 34 – Admirala Geprata – Železnička stanica ″Beograd centar″
- 34L – Železnička stanica ″Beograd centar" – Bolnica ″Dragiša Mišović″
- 36 – Trg Republike – Viline vode – Dunav Stanica
- 38A - Pogon Kosmaj - Železnička stanica Beograd centar - Železnička stanica Topčider
- 61 – Zeleni venac - Block 70a (New Belgrade)
- 62 – Zeleni venac – Block 70 (New Belgrade)
- 63 – Zeleni venac – Block 45 (New Belgrade)
- 64 – Zeleni venac – Block 45 (New Belgrade) (63 and 64 had the same termini, but different routes)
- 66 – Block 61 (New Belgrade) – Višnjica
- 69 – GO Novi Beograd – Depo Sava
- 70 – Block 45 (New Belgrade) – Novo bežanijsko groblje
- 74 – Zemun (Kej oslobođenja) – Novo bežanijsko groblje
- 93 – Pančevački most /Railway station/ – Zvezdara (Pijaca)
- 96N – Trg Republike – Kotež – Borča 3
- 99 – Zvezdara (Pijaca) – Block 44 (New Belgrade)
- 110 – Padinska skela – Široka greda
- 302L – Ustanička – Restoran ″Boleč″
- 306L – Ustanička – Leštane
- 404 – Voždovac – Ripanj (Brđani)
- 406 – Voždovac – Stara Lipovica
- 505 - Miljakovac 1 - Miljakovačke staze
- 505R - Miljakovac 1 - Rakovački potok
- 506 - Resnik /Edvarda Griga/ - Resnik /Patin majdan/
- 552 – Main railway station – Umka
- 600 – Bežanija (Ledine) – Dobanovci
- 602 – Surčin – Jakovo
- 606 – Surčin – Dobanovci
- 607 – Surčin – Novi Beograd (Pohorska)
- 701N – Trg Republike – Nova Galenika – Zemun polje – Nova Pazova
- E3 – Cerak vinogradi – Block 45 (New Belgrade)
- E4 – Bežanijska kosa – Mirijevo 3
- E5 - Zvezdara - Novi Beograd Blok 70
- E7 – Pančevački most /Railway station/ – Petlovo brdo
- E8 – Dorćol (SRC ″Milan Gale Muškatirović″) – Braće Jerković

== Rapid transit ==
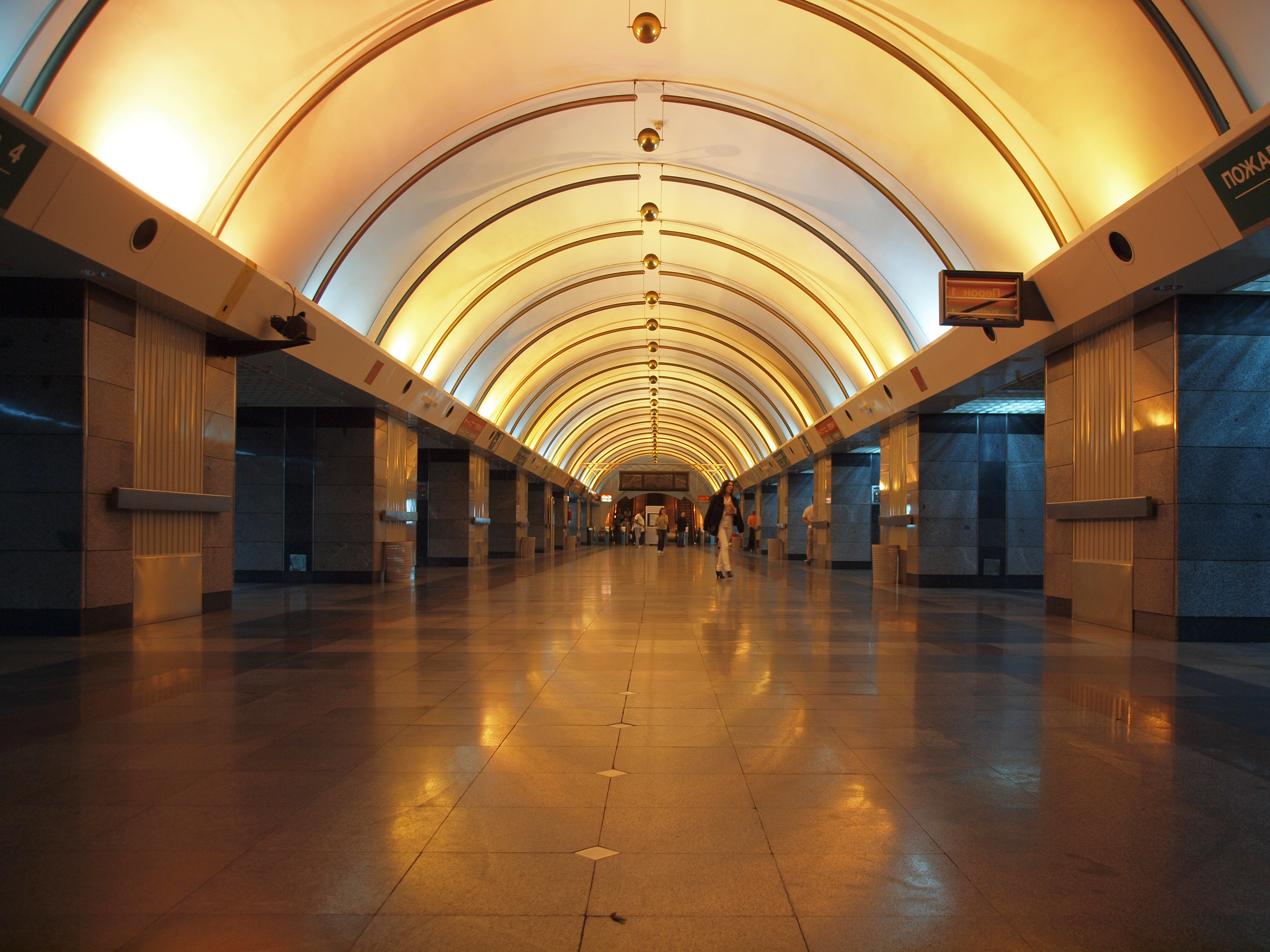
Voz underground station Vukov spomenik

Belgrade is one of the few European capitals and cities with a population of over a million which have no metro/subway or another rapid transit system.

=== Metro ===
The idea of a metro system for Belgrade has been around for nearly a century. The Belgrade Metro started construction in November 2021 and the first line is scheduled to open in the year 2033. It is considered to be the third most important project in the country, after work on roads and railways. The two projects of highest priority are the Belgrade bypass and Pan-European corridor X.

=== Inter-Cityrail ===
On September 1, 2010, as an "almost" metro line and the actual metro's 1st phase, the first line of Belgrade's new urban BG:Voz system, separate from suburban commuter Beovoz system, started its operation. The first line at the time connected Pančevački Most Station with Novi Beograd Railway Station and used the semi-underground level of Beograd Centar rail station, two underground stations (Vukov Spomenik and Karađorđev park) and tunnels in the city centre that were built for ground rail tracks to Novi Beograd. The line had just 5 stations (Pančevački most, Vukov spomenik, Karađorđev park, Beograd Centar and Novi Beograd, which it shared with Beovoz), was 8 kilometer long and the commute took about 16 minutes. Train frequency was from 30 minutes with 15 minutes frequency during rush hour. The line uses the stock similar to suburban Soviet/Latvian electric rolling stocks with upper current collectors including ER31 with 3 doors along the side of car. In April 2011, the line was extended to Batajnica, and in December 2016 to Ovča. The new line has a daily riding of about 18500. A new line from Ovča to Resnik is planned to open in 2018.

== Suburban ==
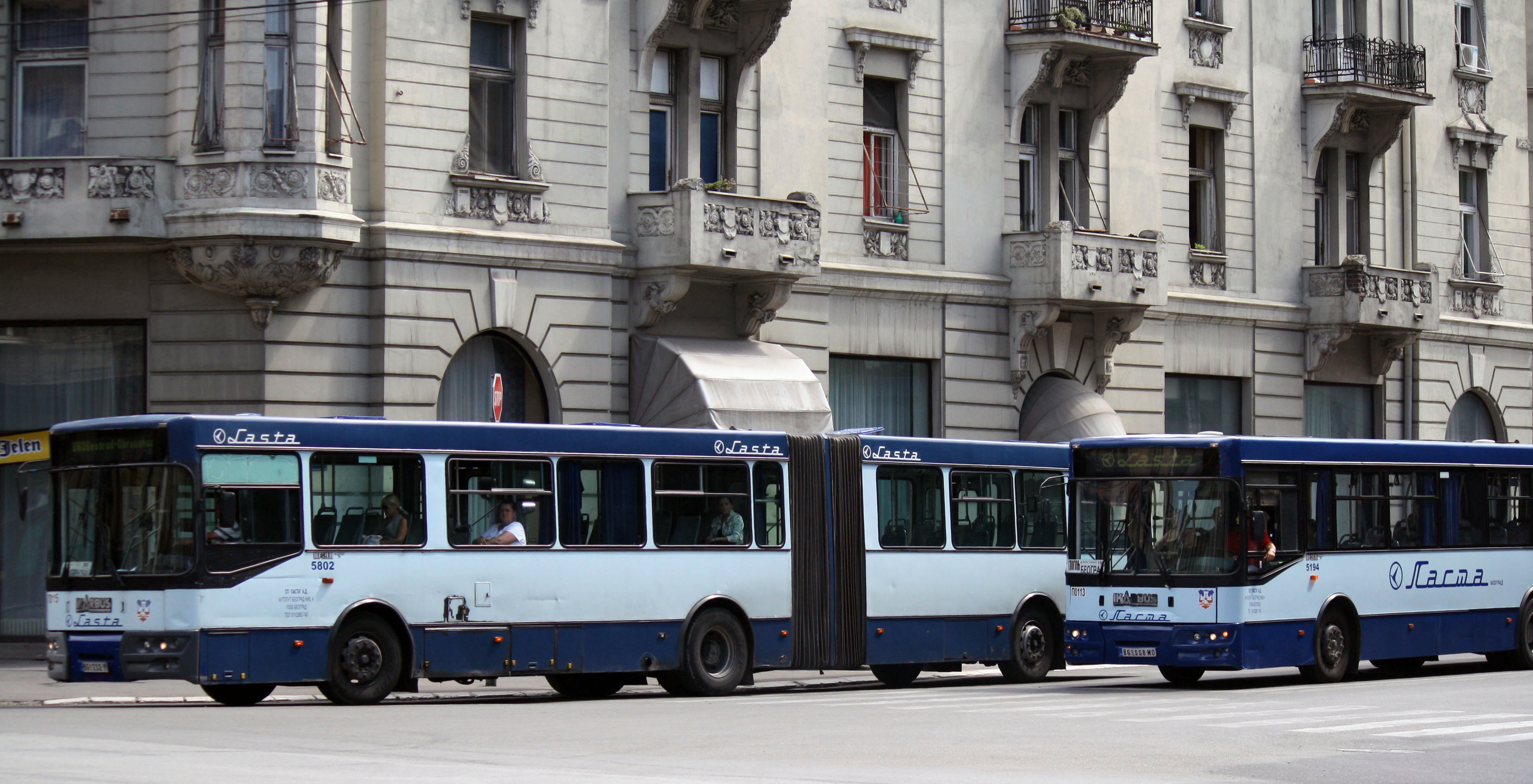
Lasta buses on suburban lines departing from Lasta Bus Station.

=== Buses ===
Suburban bus transportation is conducted by SP Lasta. Beside Lasta, certain number of suburban lines are operated by other carriers, too. Suburban transport on the territory of Belgrade is performed within the integrated tariff system 2 (ITS2), with over 300 lines and 2,500 daily departures. The network of suburban lines spreads radially from Belgrade to the centers of the suburban municipalities, from which Lasta's local lines can be used to reach smaller places. Suburban buses depart from the Lasta Bus Station in Belgrade and from the terminus of Šumice near Konjarnik in the neighbourhood of Zvezdara and another in Banovo Brdo. Lasta transports passengers in the local transport in the areas of the Mladenovac, Sopot, Lazarevac, Obrenovac, Grocka, and Barajevo municipalities. Bus Lines:

- 350 Živkovac - Dražanj - Grocka - Živkovac
- 351 Šumice - Grocka - Dražanj
- 352 Šumice - Autoputem - Dražanj
- 352A Šumice - Vrčin - Dražanj
- 353 Dražanj - Živkovac - Šumice (autoputem)
- 354 Šumice - Vrčin - Zaklopača - Grocka - Kamendol
- 354A Živkovac - Grocka - Zaklopača - Vrčin - Šumice
- 354B Šumice - Vrčin - Zaklopača - Grocka
- 355 Dražanj - Kamendol - Grocka - Šumice
- 355A Šumice - Živkovac - Dražanj
- 355L Grocka - Kamendol - Umčari
- 356 Šumice - Grocka - Brestovik - Pudarci
- 361 Šumice - Grocka - Živkovac
- 361L Dražanj - Grocka
- 361B Šumice - Grocka - Živkovac - Dražanj
- 362 Živkovac - Šumice (autoputem)
- 363 Živkovac - Grocka - Šumice
- 363A Šumice - Grocka - Živkovac
- 363L Grocka - Kamendol - Živkovac
- 366 Kamendol - Šumice (autoputem)
- 366A Kamendol - Ilinski kraj - Šumice (autoputem)
- 450 Beograd - Ralja - Sopot
- 451 Beograd - Ralja - Staro selo - Stojnik
- 451A Beograd - Ralja - Stojnik
- 460 Beograd - Autoputem - Mala Ivanča
- 460A Beograd - Autoputem - Drumine - Mala Ivanča
- 461 Šumice - Vrčin - Ramnice
- 462 Šumice - Vrčin - Jaričište
- 463 Šumice - Vrčin - Jaričište - Ramnice
- 464 Beograd - Autoputem - Mali Požarevac - Drumine - Sopot
- 465 Beograd - Autoputem - Stanojevac - Sopot (polazak u 23:30 saobraća preko Slavije i nosi oznaku 4652)
- 466 Beograd - Jaričište - Vrčin
- 466A Beograd - Jaričište - Vrčin
- 467 Vrčin /Avalski put/ - Zaklopača - Grocka - Brestovik - Pudarci /Ilinski kraj/
- 468 Beograd - Jaričište - Vrčin - Grocka
- 470 Beograd - Ralja - Mala Ivanča
- 470A Beograd - Ralja - Parcani - Mala Ivanča
- 474 Beograd - Ralja - Parcani
- 491 Beograd - Ralja - Mladenovac
- 491A Beograd - Slavija - Ralja - Sopot - Mladenovac
- 493 Beograd - Autoputem - Mladenovac
- 493A Beograd - Slavija - Autoputem - Mladenovac
- 493K Mladenovac - Beograd (Mostar) - Mladenovac (autoputem)
- 494A Beograd - Autoputem - Senaja - Mladenovac
- 499 Beograd - Autoputem - Senaja - Šepšin - Dubona - Mladenovac
- 560 Banovo brdo - Barajevo
- 560A Banovo brdo - Sremčica - Barajevo
- 560E Banovo brdo - Barajevo
- 561 Banovo brdo - Meljak - Baćevac - Guncati - Barajevo
- 561A Banovo brdo - Guncati - Baćevac - Barajevo
- 581 Beograd - Stepojevac - Vreoci - Lazarevac
- 581A Beograd - Stepojevac - Vreoci - Lazarevac (Bolnica)
- 581E Beograd - Stepojevac - Vreoci - Lazarevac
- 583 Beograd - Stepojevac - Vreoci - Rudovci - Kruševica - Trbušnica
- 583A Beograd - Stepojevac - Vreoci - Rudovci - Kruševica
- 584 Lazarevac - Veliki Borak - Barajevo
- 585 Beograd - Stepojevac - Mirosaljci (Gunjevac)
- 586 Banovo brdo - Stepojevac - Veliki Crljeni
- 588 Beograd - Leskovac - Stepojevac - Mirosaljci (Gunjevac)
- 591 Banovo brdo - Vranić - Taraiš
- 591A Banovo brdo - Vranić - Rašića kraj
- 592 Banovo brdo - Vranić - Rašića kraj - Draževac
- 593 Banovo brdo - Meljak - Šiljakovac - Vranić - Taraiš
- 593A Banovo brdo - Meljak - Šiljakovac - Vranić - Rašića kraj
- 593B Banovo brdo - Meljak - Šiljakovac
- 601 Belgrade Waterfront - Surčin
- 602 Block 44 - SRC Surčin
- 603 Ledine - Dobanovci - Ugrinovci
- 604 Block 45 - Petrovčić - Preka Kaldrma
- 605 Block 45 - Boljevci - Progar
- 606 Dobanovci - Grmovac
- 607 Banovo brdo - Bežanijska kosa - Aerodrom /Nikola Tesla/ LINE TO THE AIRPORT
- 610 Zemun /Kej oslobođenja/ - Jakovo
- 611 Zemun /Kej oslobođenja/ - Dobanovci
- 860 Beograd - Obrenovac
- 860A Beograd - Mala Moštanica - Barič /ambulanta/
- 860B Beograd - Mala Moštanica - Barič /Industrial zone/
- 860BL Lazarevac - Barič /Industrial zone/
- 860E Beograd - Obrenovac
- 861A Beograd - Mala Moštanica - Obrenovac
- 865 Banovo brdo - Sremčica - Velika Moštanica
- 904 Surčin - Obrenovac

=== Railway (now disfunct) ===
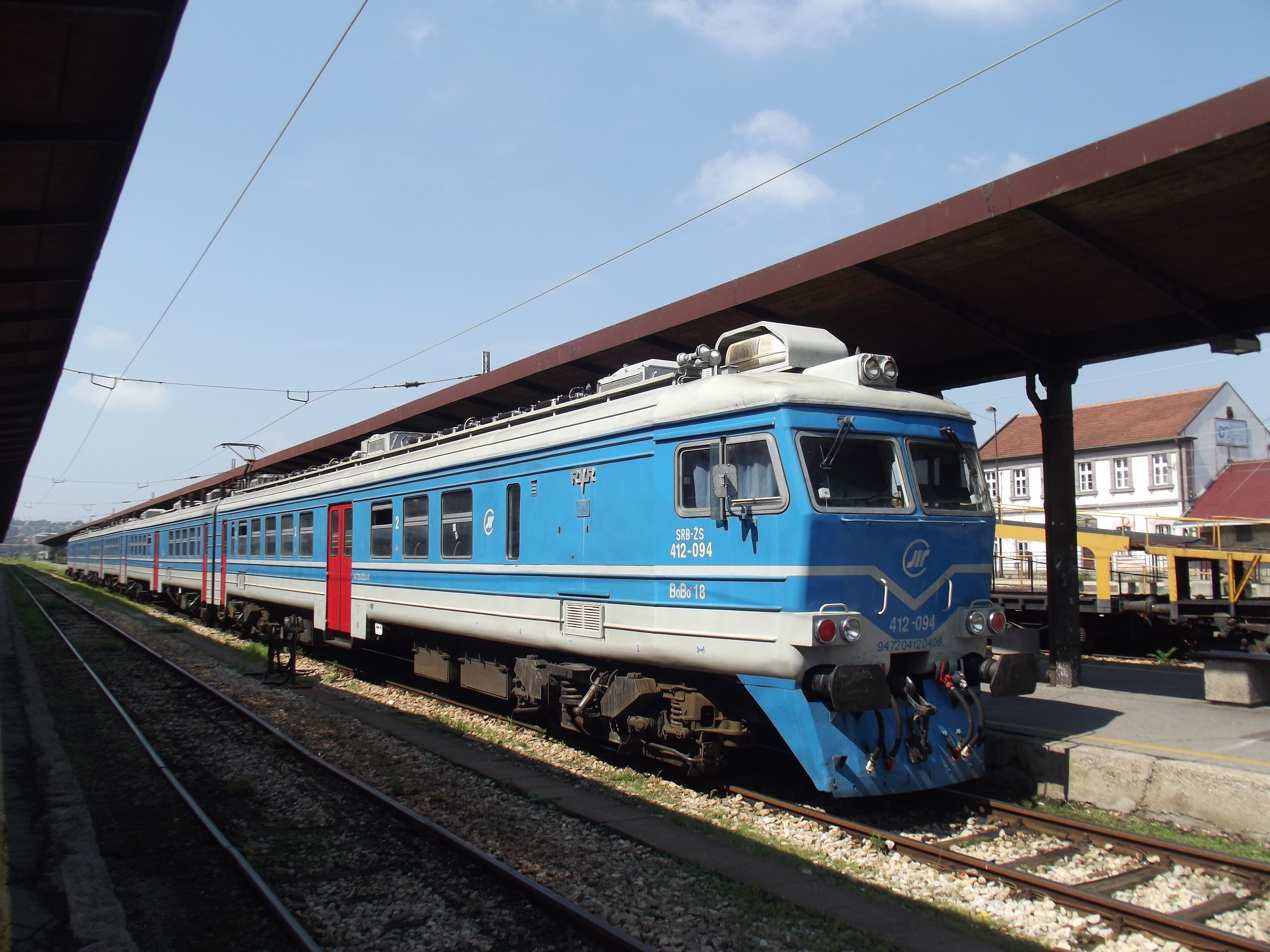
Beovoz EMU

Similar to French RER, suburban rail system Beovoz was operated by Serbian Railways, the national railway company. In its final stage, Beovoz had six lines with 41 stations and 70 km length:

- Line 1 Nova Pazova – Pančevo Vojlovica
- Line 2 Ripanj – Pančevo Vojlovica
- Line 3 Nova Pazova – Novi Beograd
- Line 4 Pančevo Vojlovica – Valjevo
- Line 5 Pančevo Glavna – Valjevo

This system became defunct in 2013.

The most of system's stations are now used for the BG voz system.

== Taxi ==
Taxi service is operated by 24 taxi companies, and is medium expensive (start is about 2.75 euros (320 Dinars). Every Belgrade taxi company has a sign on top of the vehicle.

== Bus ==
Belgrade is connected by intercity bus lines with all major towns in Serbia, while during summer and winter tourist seasons there are also special seasonal lines. There is a good connection with the cities in Republika Srpska and North Macedonia. The international bus lines to Western Europe are mainly focused on Germany, Austria, Switzerland and France, where buses can be taken for all other destinations.

SP Lasta, besides suburban transport, carries passengers in intercity transport on regular lines in Serbia and Montenegro and Republika Srpska and in international transport, as part of the Eurolines organization.

== Train ==
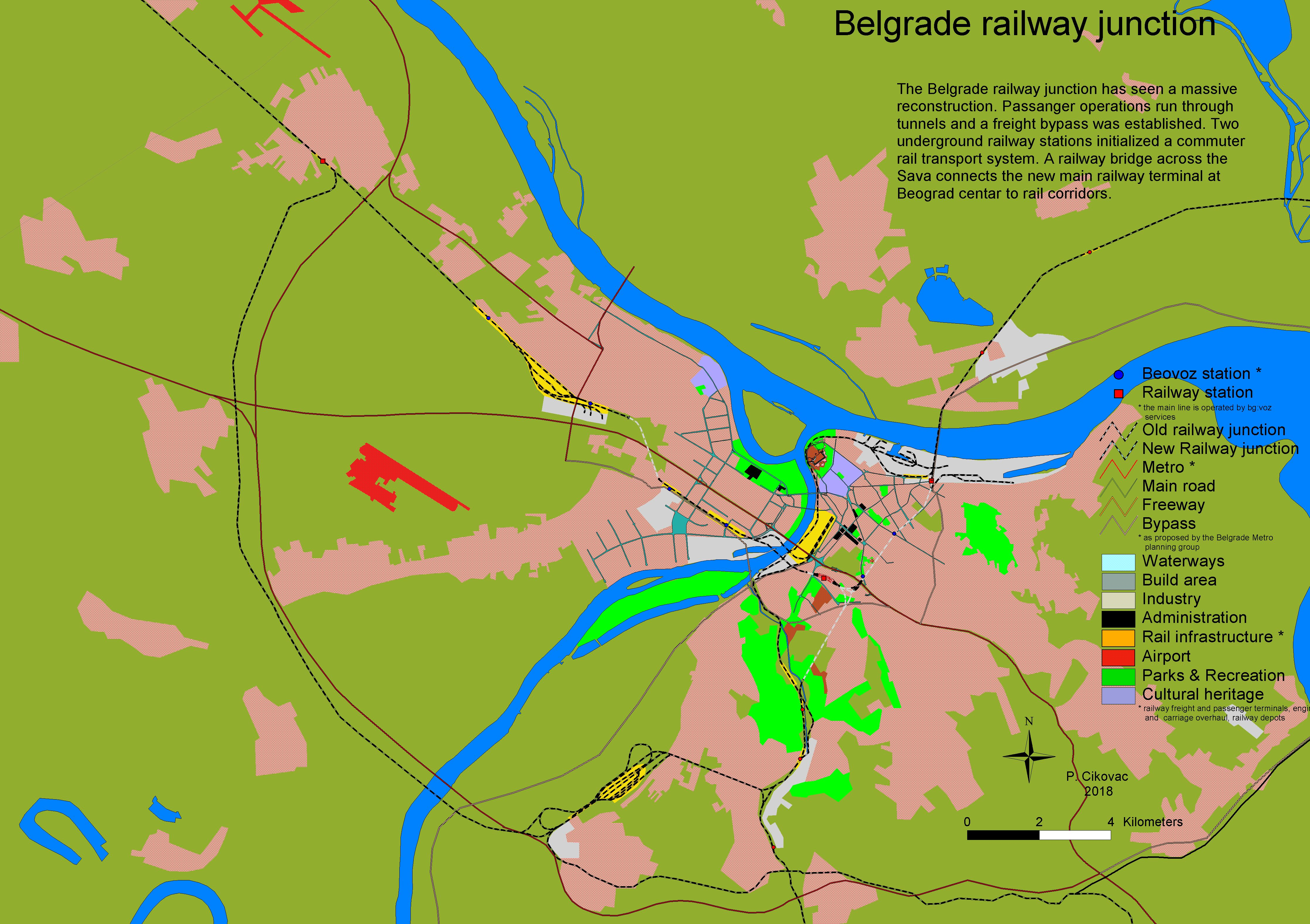
Public transportation in Belgrade. Parts of the bypass, railway junction and bridges across Save and Danube are under construction or part of the general urban planning. The proposed Metro lines are based on the final Metro plan from 1982 from the Belgrade Metro planning group.

The Belgrade railroad network is currently under reconstruction . The massive reconstruction scheme of the Belgrade railway junction calls for completion of the new central Prokop railway station that is to replace the historical Belgrade Main railway station (Serbian: Главна Железничка Станица, Glavna železnička stanica) situated near the downtown and Sava river. Belgrade is directly connected by train with many European cities (Thessaloniki, Istanbul, Sofia, Bucharest, Budapest, Vienna, Kyiv, Moscow, etc).

In addition, there are 5 more railway stations in Belgrade (Centar – Prokop, Dunav, Rakovica, Novi Beograd, Zemun). Some long distance and international trains do not call at Central Station, but at Novi Beograd.

A new central railway station has been under construction since 1977 at the site named Prokop. The new railway station will be called "Beograd Center"; upon its completion all Belgrade rail traffic currently handled by the old railway station situated near the downtown district will be transferred to the new station freeing thousands of square meters of prime real estate along the Sava and substantially easing the rail travel into Belgrade. After years of delay, this ambitious project is set to be completed in the next few years pending the new international tender for its completion set to be announced by the government at the beginning of March 2006. The train terminals will be situated underground while the vast passenger terminal will be above ground featuring commercial spaces, possibly a hotel and other amenities. Most of the rough work on the station's train terminals has been completed thus far. Belgrade has been restricted in its use of its vast waterfront precisely because of the large rail infrastructure that hug the river banks of the Old Town. Completion of this station is signaling a major boom in Belgrade's waterfront development.

== Air ==
The international airport, Belgrade Nikola Tesla Airport, is located 12 km outside the city. It is connected with the city by the Belgrade – Zagreb highway. Bus line of public transport number 72 and A1 connect Airport with downtown. Airport provides connections with many cities in Europe, Asia and Africa. A major expansion of the airport in Belgrade has been detailed with a development deal signed with DynaCorp. Inc. to build a regional air cargo hub, but the plan has failed. Belgrade airport also plans to build a third passenger terminal and another runway; however this may not be feasible in the immediate future.

Batajnica Air Base is a military airport located in the Batajnica suburb of Belgrade.

== River ==
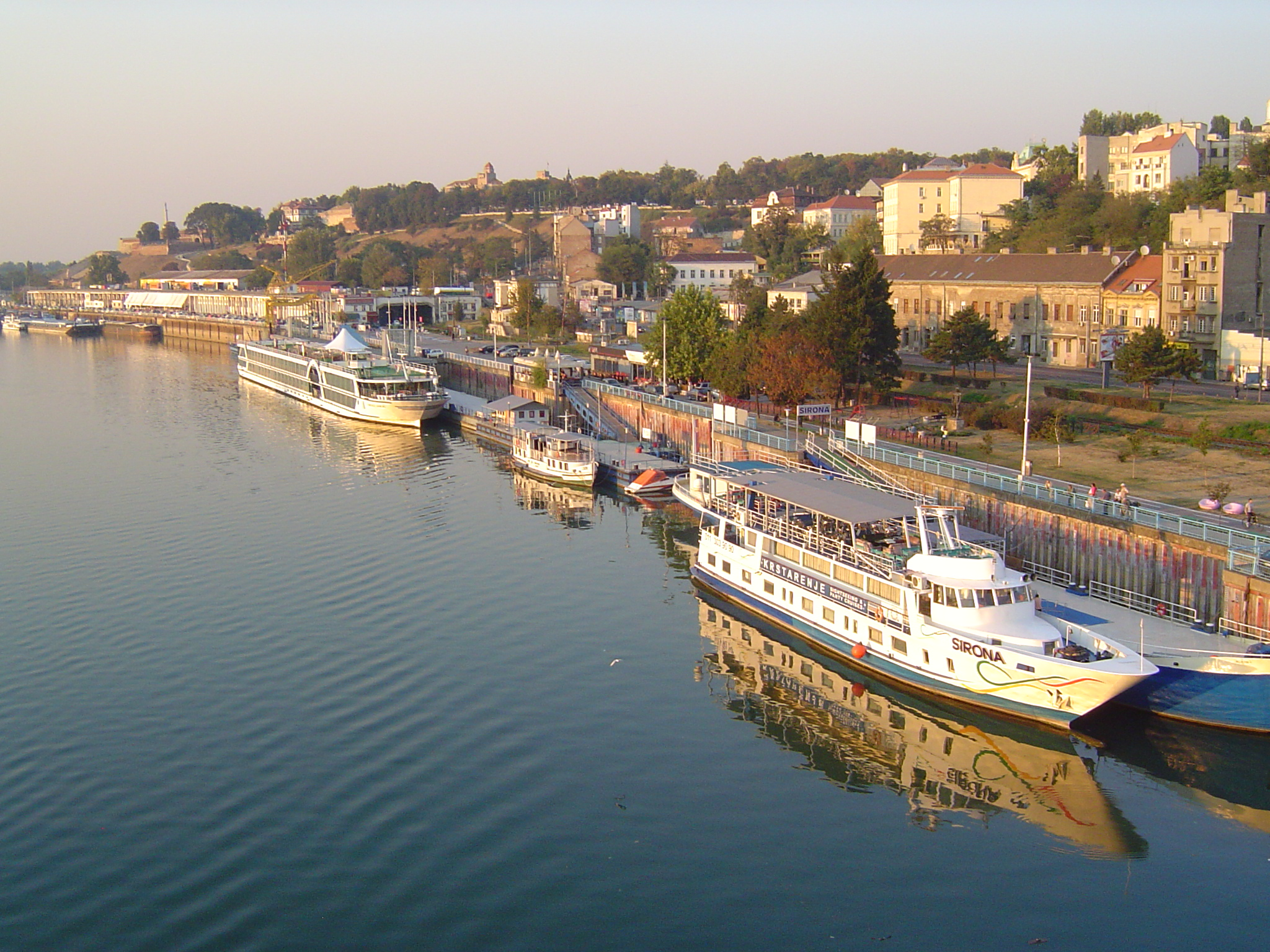
Sava port

Belgrade has a commercial port on the banks of Danube named Luka Beograd. There is also a tourist port on the banks of the Sava welcoming various river cruise vessels from across Europe. Belgrade has several impromptu sporting marinas near the islands of Ada Ciganlija and Ada Međica harbouring small sail boats and sporting/recreational vessels. There are no regular passenger lines from the Belgrade Port (Luka Beograd), although tourist and individual lines run occasionally. Answering to the need for a real sporting/recreational marina a detailed plan for a marina in Dorćol on the banks of the Danube has been presented to the public, and an international tender for its development has been announced.

=== Bridges ===
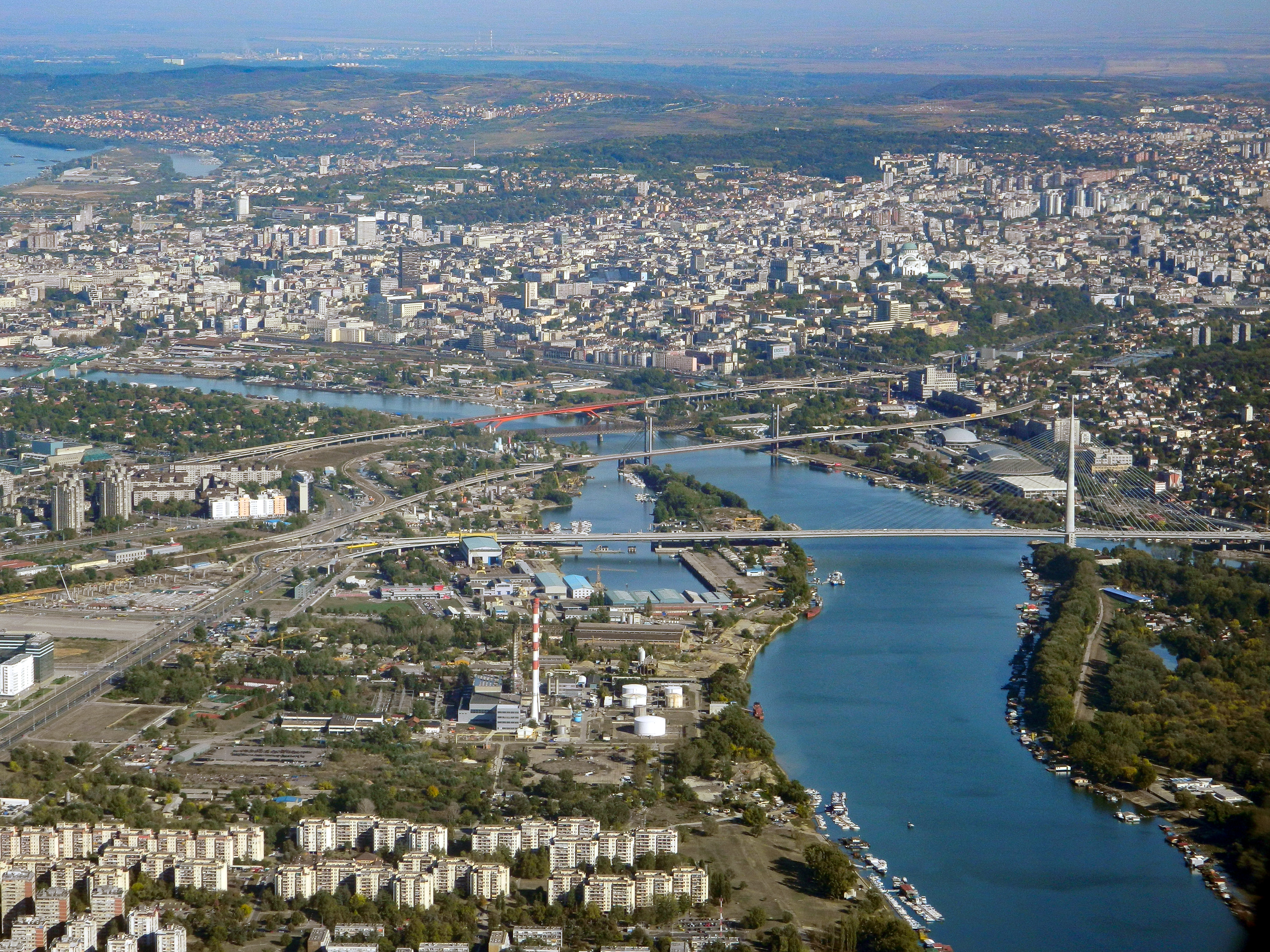
A view over the Sava river. From bottom to top: Ada Bridge, New Railroad Bridge, Old Railroad Bridge, Gazela Bridge, Old Sava Bridge

There are nine bridges over the Sava and two over the Danube river, listed below:

==== Sava ====
- Obrenovac-Surčin Bridge (Most Obrenovac-Surčin), the two-lane road truss bridge over the Sava at Obrenovac — 30 km southwest of Belgrade, constructed by Mostogradnja between 1994 and 1999. The total length of the bridge is 446.5 m, with the longest span of 141 m. The bridge was originally designed to carry only two heating water pipelines, but was later redesigned and built as a road bridge with the two pipelines on side cantilevers. Finished in 2011.
- Obrenovac-Surčin Bridge (A2 motorway) Six lanes expressway bridge under construction. Opening is late 2019.
- The single-track railway truss bridge over Sava at Ostružnica — just outside the urbanized area of Belgrade, serving the freight bypass line. The bridge was badly damaged during the 1999 NATO bombing. Fully reconstructed in 2002.
- Ostružnica Bridge (Ostružnički most) is the three-lane semi-highway girder bridge over Sava at Ostružnica on the Belgrade bypass motorway — constructed by Mostogradnja between 1990 and 1998. Total length of the bridge is 1,789.6 m, with a 588 m-long (1,929 ft) continuous steel structure crossing the river in five spans. The largest span is 198 m. The bridge was bombed by NATO during the Kosovo war in 1999 and fully reconstructed by 2004. The additional three-lane span is currently under construction and it will be opened in March 2020.
- Ada Bridge (Most na Adi) a 969 m-long (3,179 ft) and 200 m-tall (660 ft) pylon bridge with six-lane roadway and unlaid double-track mass transit right-of-way is opened in 2012.
- New Railroad Bridge (Novi železnički most) over the Sava — a double-track cable-stayed bridge built in 1979.
- Old Railroad Bridge (Stari železnički most) over the Sava – a single-track truss bridge originally built in 1886.
- Gazela Bridge (Gazela) — a single-span six-lane motorway bridge over the Sava, the main traffic artery into the city, built in 1970.
- Old Sava Bridge (Stari savski most) — a 410 m-long (1,350 ft) two-lane road and tram bridge. The main span is a tied arch bridge over 100 m in length. During World War II it was the only road bridge available in Belgrade, the current span being installed in 1942, and one of the few bridges in Europe which the retreating German forces failed to demolish. In October 1944, the bridge, already laden with explosives and prepared for demolition, was saved by a local resistance veteran Miladin Zarić who managed to cut the detonator wires. Adding new lanes and full reconstruction is scheduled for 2017. Total investment is 60 million Euros.
- Branko's Bridge (Brankov most) — a 450 m-long (1,480 ft) six-lane road girder bridge over Sava, connecting the center of Belgrade to the densely populated residential suburb of Novi Beograd. Originally built as Most kralja Aleksandra (Bridge of King Alexander) in 1934 it was a chain bridge. The bridge was destroyed in 1941 and rebuilt in 1956 as a single-span bridge; at the time it was the longest bridge of that kind in the world.

==== Danube ====
- Pupin Bridge (Pupinov most) is the newest six-lane road bridge over the Danube. Named after scientist Mihajlo Pupin, it was constructed by the China Road and Bridge Corporation and opened in December 2014.
- Pančevo Bridge (Pančevački most) — a 1,075 m-long (3,527 ft) combined four-lane road and double-track railroad truss bridge over the Danube, originally built in 1935. It was destroyed during World War II, and rebuilt after the end of the war in 1946. The overhaul and installation of the second rail track was completed in 2015.

== Roads ==
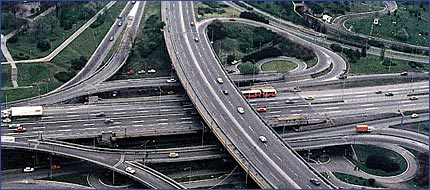
Mostar interchange

Belgrade is connected by motorways to Zagreb to the west, Novi Sad to the north and Niš to the south. The motorways feed traffic into a large interchange popularly called Mostar. A wide boulevard, Kneza Miloša street, connects the interchange to the city centre.

A traffic decongestion project named unutrašnji magistralni prsten ("inner ring road") is set to begin with the goal of easing the congestion in the city centre and on the motorways.
