= International Bridge =

International Bridge may refer to:

- Baudette-Rainy River International Bridge, connecting Rainy River, Ontario and Baudette, Minnesota
- Fort Frances-International Falls International Bridge, connecting Fort Frances, Ontario and International Falls, Minnesota
- International Railway Bridge, a railroad bridge connecting Fort Erie, Ontario and Buffalo, New York
- Laredo International Bridge 1, connecting Laredo, Texas and Nuevo Laredo, Tamaulipas
- Laredo International Bridge 2, connecting Laredo, Texas and Nuevo Laredo, Tamaulipas
- Laredo International Bridge 3, connecting Laredo, Texas and Colombia, Nuevo León
- Laredo International Bridge 4, connecting Laredo, Texas and Nuevo Laredo, Tamaulipas
- Laredo International Railway Bridge, connecting Laredo, Texas and Nuevo Laredo, Tamaulipas
- Pharr-Reynosa International Bridge, connecting Pharr, Texas and Reynosa, Tamaulipas
- Sault Ste. Marie International Bridge, connecting Sault Ste. Marie, Ontario and Sault Ste. Marie, Michigan
- Seaway International Bridge, connecting Cornwall, Ontario and Massena, New York

== See also ==
- International Railway Bridge (disambiguation)
- List of international bridges
- Category:International bridges
