= Old Railway Bridge =

Bridge in Belgrade, Serbia

Old Railroad Bridge
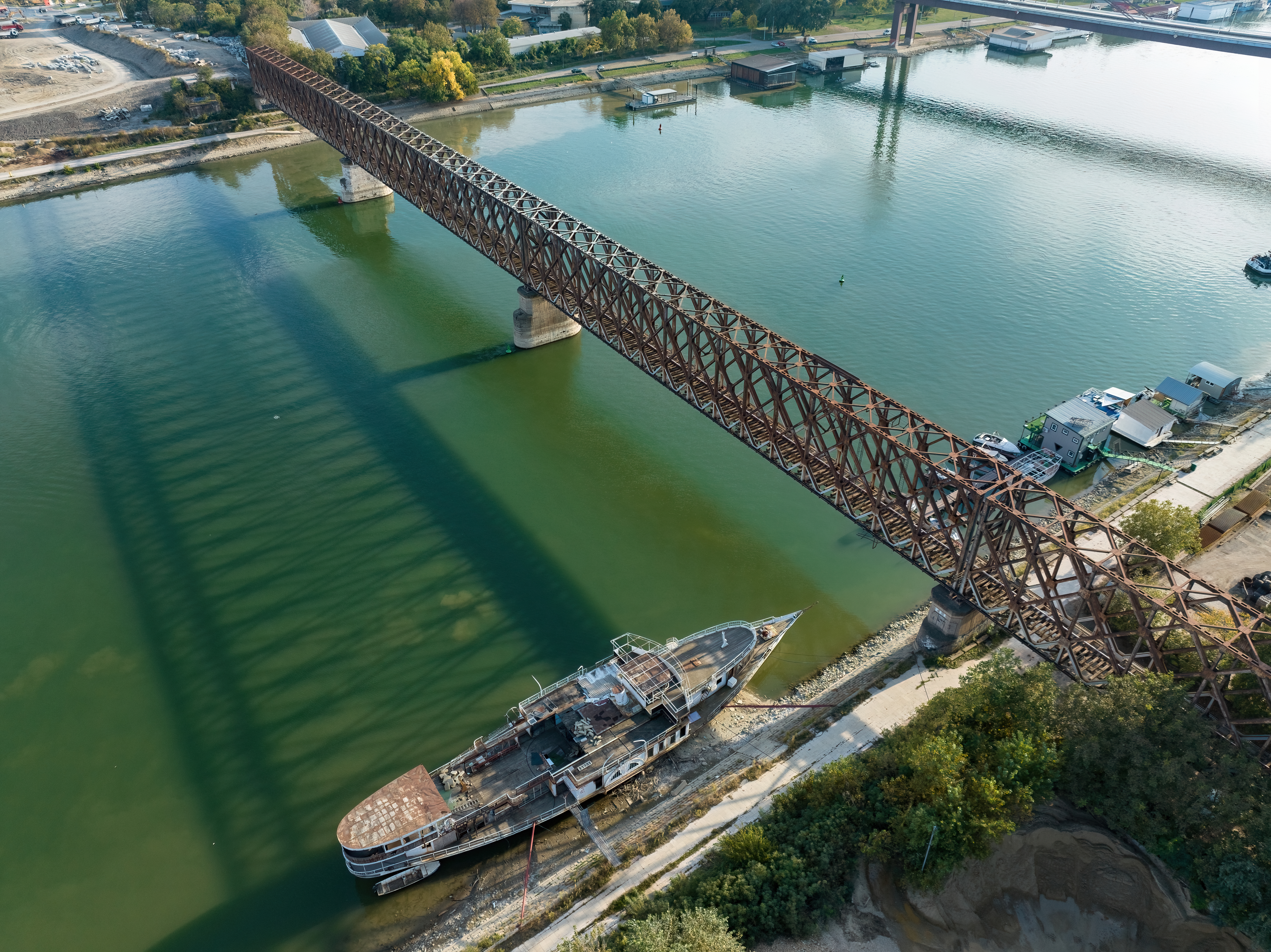
- Coordinates: 44.801378°N 20.439093°E
- Carries: Railway
- Crosses: Sava
- Locale: Belgrade
- Official name: Стари железнички мост Stari železnički most

Characteristics
- Total length: 462 metres (1,516 ft)
- Longest span: Serbian Railways Infrastructure

History
- Opened: 1 September 1884; 140 years ago (Original construction)

Statistics
- Toll: No

Old Railroad Bridge (Serbian: Стари железнички мост, romanized: Stari železnički most) is a bridge over the Sava river in Belgrade, the capital of Serbia. It was the first railway bridge in Belgrade and today is one of two across the Sava, and three in general. It is not operational since the summer of 2018.

== Location ==
From the old, Šumadija section of the city, it crosses the Sava between the southern extension of the Bara Venecija neighborhood, just north of the Belgrade Fair complex. On the Syrmian side, it enters New Belgrade next to the industrial neighborhoods of Savski Nasip and Mala Ciganlija. It is located between the Gazela Bridge on the north and the New Railroad Bridge on the south.

== History ==
=== Origin ===
At the 1878 Congress of Berlin, Principality of Serbia was de jure recognized as an independent state from the Ottoman Empire and the great powers of the day decided that Serbia should construct the railway. Not economically developed to begin with, Serbia was additionally pauperized after the Serbian-Ottoman wars from 1876 to 1878, so it lacked the funds. Prince Milan Obrenović and the government announced the request for tender and the bidding was won by a French company. Popular story goes that prince Milan took a bribe of 1 million francs in gold, in order to give the job to the French, but that was never proven.

=== Construction ===
The concession included the construction of the Belgrade–Niš railway, the railway bridge over the Sava and a railway which will connect Belgrade to Zemun, at the time, the border town of Austria-Hungary. Serbian state had the obligation to build the railway station but the works on the building lagged behind the construction of the railway and the bridge, so when the time came for the first train to pass through Belgrade, the object wasn't finished. It had to be ceremonially open, even though it was still covered with scaffolds. The first train from this station departed towards Zemun with courtly honors, on 1 September [O.S. 20 August] 1884, at 3 p.m. As Serbia was declared a kingdom in 1882, the first passengers were now King Milan, Queen Natalie and the Crown Prince Alexander, on the way to Vienna.

Construction of the bridge, however, began in January 1882 and was finished in 31 months, which was a great accomplishment. It was finished in the summer of 1884. The load test was organized on 30 August [O.S. 18 August] 1884 and the day after. 24 carts loaded with pebble and 9 locomotives tested it. The state technical inspection was done one day later, when the royal train crossed the bridge.

When constructed, the 462 m (1,516 ft) long bridge on six, cuboid-shaped stone pillars, weighted 7,200 tons.

The bridge was under the joint ownership of Serbia and Austria-Hungary.

=== World War I ===
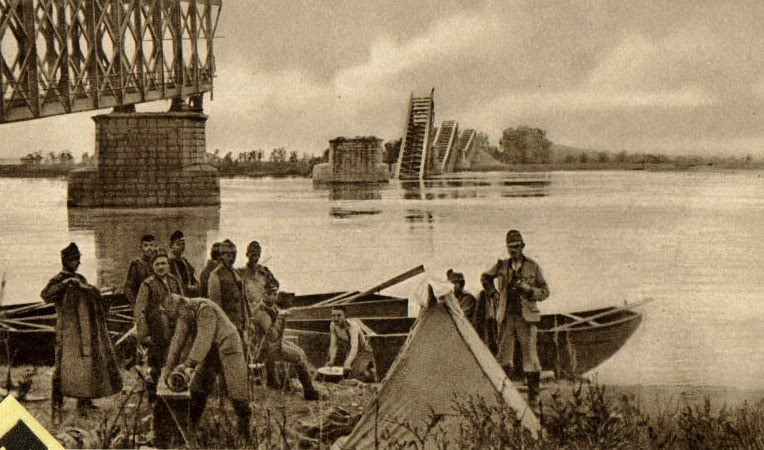
Demolished bridge

The bridge was demolished in both World Wars (three times only in the World War I) and the present construction was placed after the World War II ended.

When the World War I broke out on 28 July 1914, the bridge was the only connection between Serbia and the Austria-Hungary who already positioned its army near the bridge. On 29 July 1914, at 1:30 a.m., captain Mihailo Alić, with his platoon of pontoniers blew up the bridge. When the powerful explosion resounded, the entire city trembled. Three parts of the steel construction fell into the river. Cutting off the only link was instrumental in the defense of the city during the inaugural period of the war. Austro-Hungarians were now forced either to invade using boats or to try to secure a foothill on the Ada Ciganlija island, which they attempted during the Battles of Ada Ciganlija. The Hungarian ship "Alkotmány" was beneath the bridge when it collapsed.

As the pillars and foundations were left unharmed, the bridge was restored by the end of 1914, but the Austro-Hungarian army damaged it in 1915. After occupying Belgrade, the military authorities restored the bridge in 1916, building also a new railroad which directly connected the bridge with the Topčider railway station, so that trains coming from Zemun didn't have to go through the Belgrade Main Station. The bridge was demolished again on 1 November 1918 by the retreating occupational army and several parts of the construction fell into the river. The pillars, however, again remained almost undamaged, so the bridge was open for traffic in October 1919.

=== Interbellum ===
Even though being operational, the works on the bridge continued. The grid-like steel construction was added by 1920, while all the works were completed only by 1922.

Despite losing its international status and becoming an internal bridge with the creation of the Kingdom of the Serbs, Croats, and Slovenes in 1918, the importance of the bridge grew as the amount of traffic greatly increased.

=== World War II ===
When Germany attacked Yugoslavia on 6 April 1941, the High Command decided to demolish all three existing bridges in Belgrade, including the railway bridge. Military commander of Belgrade, general Vojislav Nikolajević, was ordered to demolish them, and the order for the Old Railway Bridge was executed by sub-lieutenant Oskar Klanšček. The bridge was demolished on 11 April. That didn't stop the invading army, so already by the end of April 1941, Germans began the reconstruction. They employed the specialized engineering units and the Polish prisoners. Provisional reparations were completed the same spring, from 23 April to 29 May, and the bridge was renamed the General Will Bridge (General Will-Brücke). The bridge was inaugurated by the General Joachim von Kortzfleisch and the train decorated with flowers crossed over it, on 31 May 1941.

In 1942, in order to expand the capacity of the railway traffic, Germans began building another, parallel bridge, 20 m (66 ft) downstream from the old bridge. The works progressed to a certain degree, but the twin bridge was never finished. In 1944 both constructions were damaged, partly in the massive Allied bombings and partly by the withdrawing German army on 19 October 1944.

Both bridges were significantly damaged, the old one much more so. Because of that, the original plan was to fix the new, unfinished bridge to become operational, but after 7 months the decision was changed and the government opted for the reconstruction of the old bridge. The steel construction of the new bridge practically just slid into the Sava, so it was used for the old bridge. The 377 m (1,237 ft) long steel construction, with the 6 m (20 ft) spans between the main carriers, was open in December 1945. Some works extended into 1946 and the reconstruction was funded by the war reparations.

=== After 1945 ===
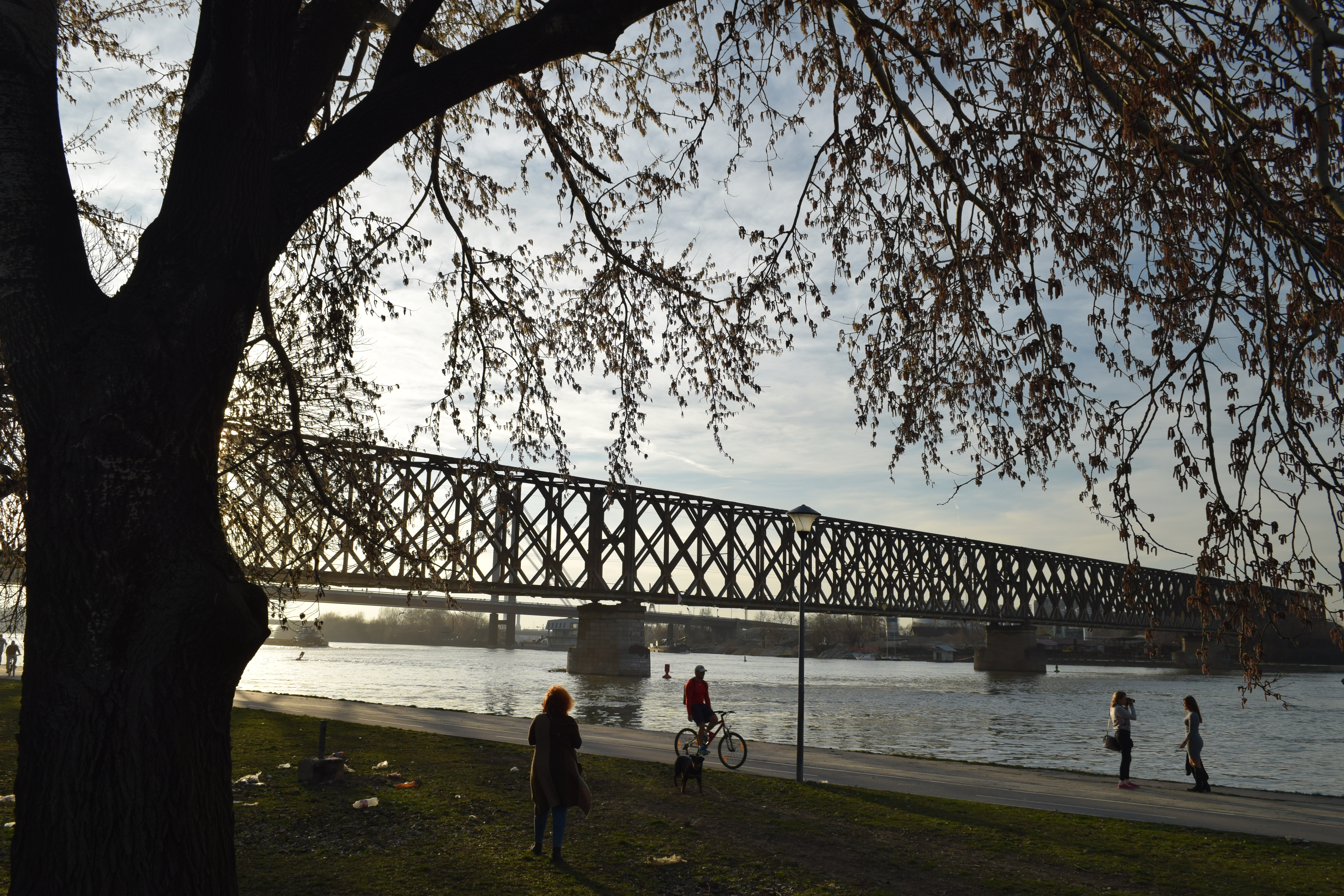
View on the bridge from the Belgrade Fair promenade along the Sava

Though projected as a temporary link in 1945, the bridge was reconstructed in 1986, when the tracks were replaced. Minor repairs on the bridge have been done in 1995 and 1996.

In any of its incarnations, the bridge was never fully painted. Popular story says that it is because the planners forgot to calculate the weight of the paint needed for the entire bridge. Also, in different periods the bridge had an arched construction, a grid-like one and the combined arched-grid construction.

In the mid-1970s there were first tentative announcements that the bridge might be demolished, since the new one was planned, so as construction of the Belgrade railway junction and Belgrade Metro. Demolition was announced in 1981, but the architects were against it. The project by Predrag Ristić, Ivan Ratković, Ivana Golubović and Miodrag Surijanac drafted a project nicknamed "Street across Sava" which included placing of restaurants and shops on the bridge, turning it into the pedestrian one, a "bazaar on Sava". The project participated in the International architectural exhibition in Wrocław, and Architecture Salon in the Museum of Contemporary Arts in Belgrade. The construction plans were developed in 1984, but in 1985 everything was postponed due to the laggings in the construction of the city's railway junction.

It partially lost importance when the New Railroad Bridge, part of the projected Belgrade railway junction, was open in 1979. As traffic importance of the bridge diminished, in 1989 architect Dragana Korica re-proposed that it should change its purpose and that shops, restaurants and cafés should be built on the bridge's lower-level construction. As the project included expansion of the Belgrade Fair to the left bank of the Sava, on top of the construction a maglev inter-fair connection was planned. As the bridge is set low, and during high water levels prevents passage of the tall ships, it was also suggested that the central part of the bridge would be hydraulically lifted when needed. Along the pylons berths were planned for smaller vessels, and staircases to the bridge level. The project was not realized.

=== 21st century ===
Panoramic view on Old Railway Bridge (view as a 360° interactive panorama)

The bridge wasn't maintained properly since, and by the 2010s, the speed of the trains crossing the bridge was limited to 10 kilometres per hour (6.2 mph). It became almost completely obsolete with the shutting down of the Belgrade Main railway station on 30 June 2018 and discontinuation of the railway traffic around the Belgrade Fortress. It was announced that the bridge will be occasionally used for the next 7–8 months, but that in 2019 the traffic across the bridge will be discontinued. However, the traffic was effectively discontinued already in the summer of 2018.

Within the scopes of the Belgrade Waterfront project, it was planned for the bridge to become a combined pedestrian and bicycle bridge, with coffeehouses and scenic viewpoints, as announced in the 2015 city plans. In December 2020, city administration announced that it would be better if it was adapted into the tram bridge and that surveys will be conducted in order to establish whether this is feasible. In the summer of 2021 the fire broke out on the bridge, due to the unmaintained electricity cables. City announced that it will inform the public on the bridge's future in 2022. Despite the experts confirmed the bridge can be transformed into the tram one, President of Serbia Aleksandar Vučić said in August 2023 that the bridge will become pedestrian-cycling bridge by 2027, in connection with the Expo 2027 project in Surčin.

Architect Ivan Ratković, co-author of the 1981 project, continued to upgrade it. Its 2022 version included timber decking of the ground level and the roof, with a total of four levels in between, connected with stairs and elevators. The project now included the 70 m (230 ft) tall tower on the New Belgrade side of the bridge, reminiscent of the Nikola Tesla's Wardenclyffe Tower on Long Island, with the Wardenclyffe Hotel. Helidrome was planned at the center of the bridge.

== Importance ==
It was the first modern bridge in the state.

This was the only railway bridge in Belgrade until 1935 when the Bridge of King Peter II, predecessor of the modern Pančevo Bridge was built across the Danube, and the only one across the Sava until 1979 when the New Railroad Bridge was open.

The first train departing from the Belgrade Main Station in 1884 crossed the bridge, so as the last one in June 2018 to Budapest, before the station was closed.

== See also ==
- Bridges of Belgrade
- Transportation in Belgrade
