= New Railway Bridge =

Bridge in Belgrade, Serbia

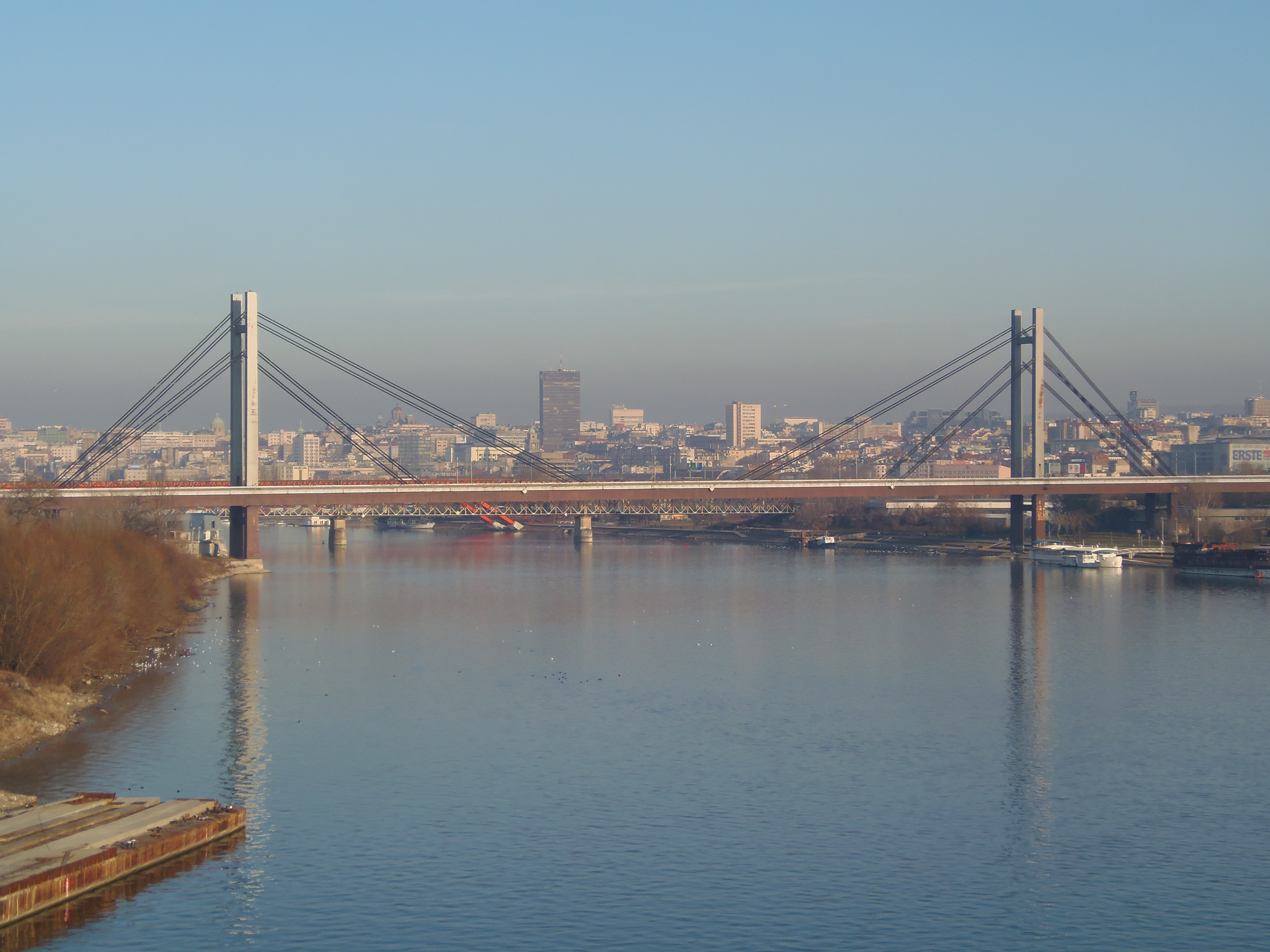
- New Railway Bridge in 2012
- Coordinates: 44°47′58″N 20°26′10″E
- Carries: Railway
- Crosses: Sava
- Locale: Belgrade
- Official name: Нови железнички мост Novi železnički most
- Maintained by: Serbian Railways Infrastructure

Characteristics
- Design: Cable-stayed bridge
- Total length: 1,928 metres (6,325 ft)
- Longest span: 254 metres (833 ft)

History
- Construction start: 1975
- Construction end: 1979
- Opened: 1983; 42 years ago

Statistics
- Toll: No

New Railway Bridge (Serbian: Нови железнички мост, romanized: Novi železnički most) is a cable-stayed bridge over the Sava river in Belgrade, the capital of Serbia. Opened in 1979, it was the second railway bridge over the Sava in Belgrade after the Old Railway Bridge in 1884, and fifth in the row of six bridges which span the river in the urban section of the city.

It was the first railway bridge in Europe to use cable-stayed girder system, as this type of bridges was used only for the motorways until that point.

== History ==
By the mid-20th century it became clear that the Old Railway Bridge can't service all the traffic. By 1971 the project of the new Belgrade railway junction was green-lighted. It envisioned a new bridge, which would make a direct link between the New Belgrade railway station and the projected central station, Prokop. Though construction of the Makiš marshalling yard was given a go first, it was the bridge which was finished before the yard as it was more important object for the entire projected junction.

City hall voted a decision to build it some 250 m (820 ft) away from the Old Railway Bridge. The construction of the bridge began in 1975. It was designed by Nikola Hajdin, engineer and future president of the Serbian Academy of Sciences and Arts, and Ljubomir Jeftović. It was decided to use the cable-stayed girder system, which up to that point was used only for the motorway bridges, not a railway ones.

The construction was slowed down due to the property issues in the neighborhood of Senjak, where the bridge was to touch the ground on the right bank of the Sava. The emptying and removal of the buildings around the Senjak Marketplace dragged on longer than planned. The placement of the bridge construction was finished in August 1978, followed by painting and anti-corrosion protection. The bridge, constructed by the Mostogradnja company, was completed and opened for traffic in 1979.

== Traffic ==
Though imagined as one of the central pieces of the new railway junction already by the end of the 1970s, it usefulness was connected with the construction of other sections of the project. However, as of 2018, the project is still largely unfinished. The railway tracks were laid over the bridge in the early 1980s and the rail was electrified. The statics testing was conducted in November 1983. Two trains, with 15 cars loaded with crushed stone, were used.

Due to the collapsing economy and the wars which followed, the central Prokop station wasn't finished and the traffic over the bridge was light as it couldn't fully serve its purpose. So, the bridge was described as being "largely neglected, both in terms of traffic, and the minds of citizens".

In 2014 the works on the Prokop were intensified and in 2016, still unfinished station, became operational. This was followed by the partial relocation of traffic from the Belgrade Main railway station. Majority of the railway traffic was rerouted to the new bridge in the late 2017 while the Main station was completely closed in July 2018, when the Old Railway Bridge effectively lost its traffic importance, leaving only the new bridge to function over the Sava.

As part of the reconstruction project of the Belgrade-Budapest trunk line, the section from Prokop (Centar) to Zemun is undergoing track modernization, which means that at the moment, one of the tracks on the bridge is closed for repairs, employing single-line working.

== Characteristics ==
The bridge is 1,928 m (6,325 ft) long.

== See also ==
- Transportation in Belgrade

== Gallery ==
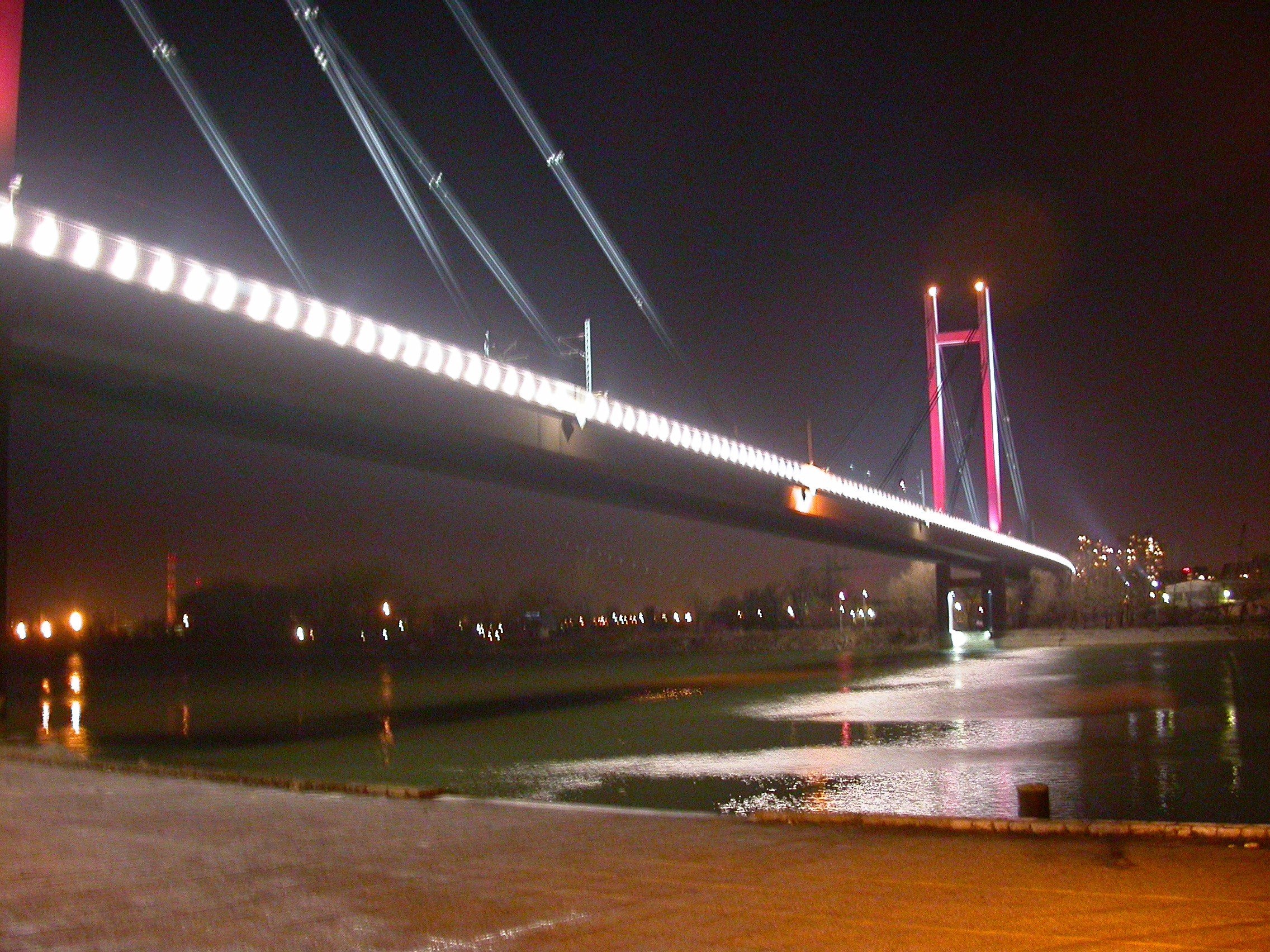
New Railway bridge during New Year eve night

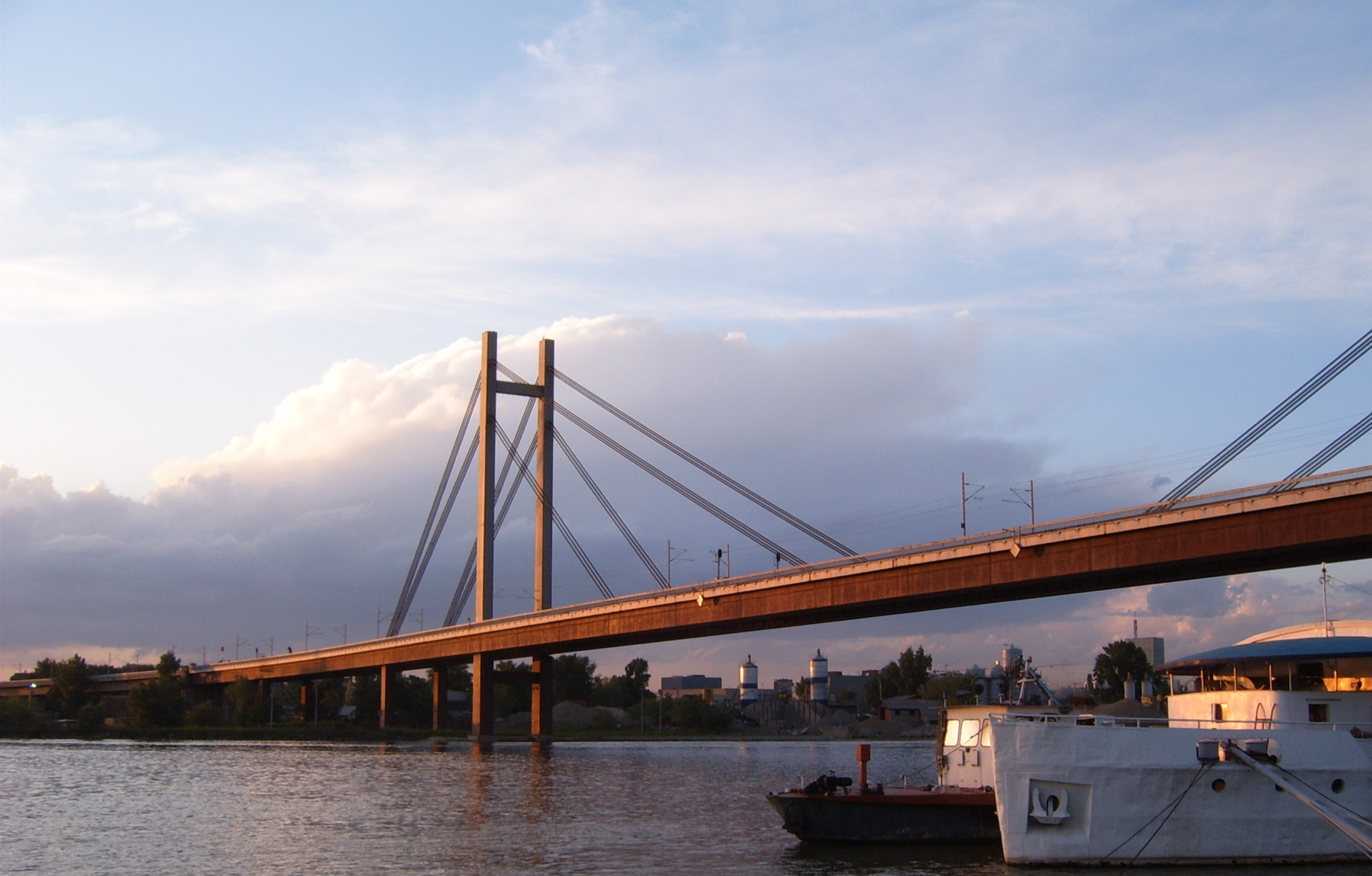
New Railway Bridge in Belgrade at dusk.
