= Vrabac (bus) =

Electric minibus service in Belgrade, Serbia

VRABAC
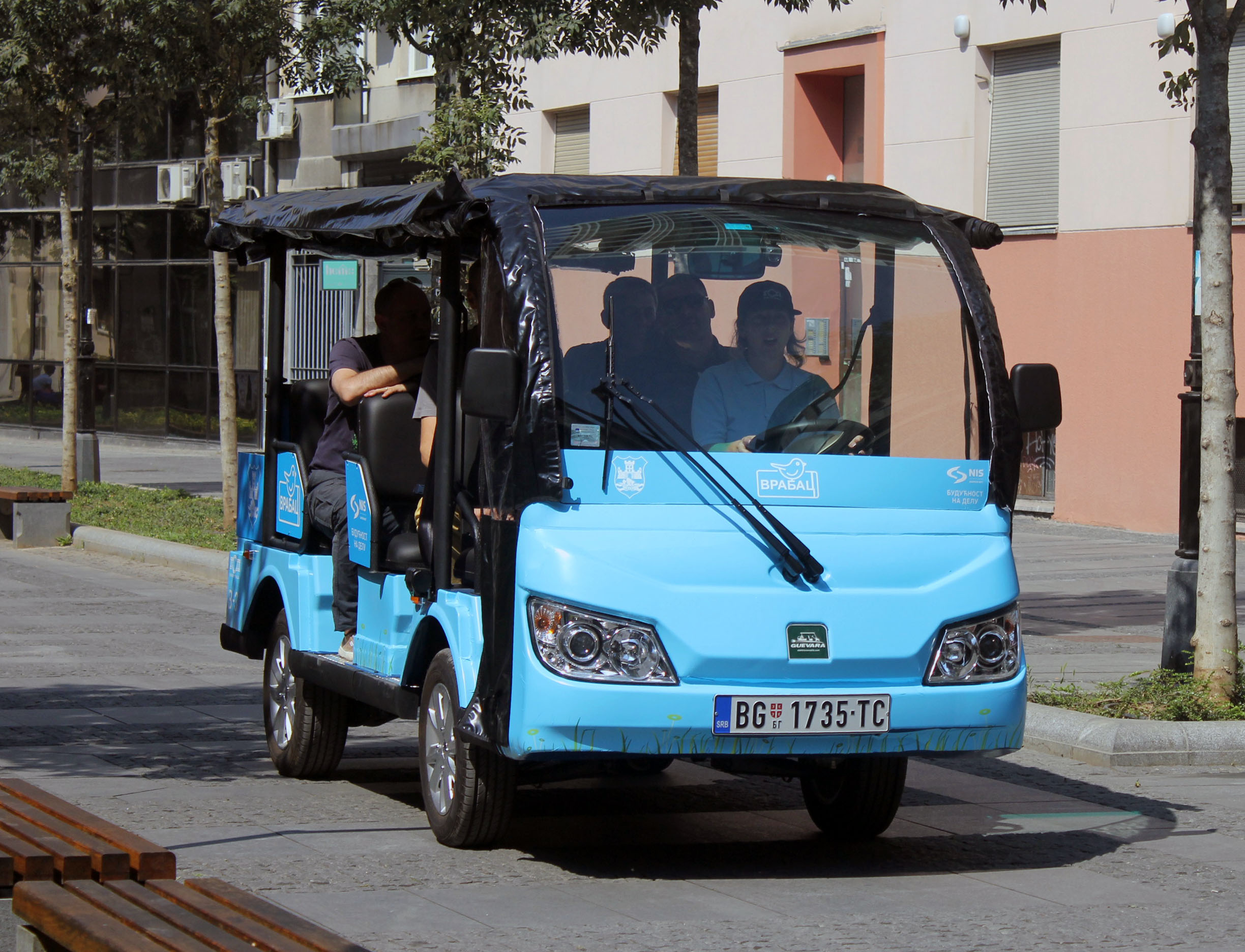

Overview
- Locale: Belgrade, Serbia
- Transit type: electric minibus
- Number of lines: 1
- Number of stations: 8

Operation
- Began operation: 1 September 2019
- Operator: GSP Belgrade
- Character: at-grade
- Headway: 10 minutes

Technical
- System length: 2.2 km (1.4 mi)
- Electrification: battery-powered
- Average speed: 8.8 km/h (5.5 mph)

The VRABAC is an electric minibus line in the pedestrian area of downtown Belgrade, Serbia. It serves eight stops - primarily historical places of interest - running in a circle between Obilićev venac and Cultural Centre of Belgrade. The vehicles are painted in a characteristic light blue color and are free to ride. With a length of 2.2 km, VRABAC is the shortest transit line in Belgrade.

== Stations ==
№	Stop	Connections
1	Kulturni centar Beograda	24, 26, 27, 31, 32E, 37, 44, E2, E9, EKO2; 28, 29, 41
2	Delijska česma	
3	Studentski trg	EKO2, 31, E9; 28, 29, 41
4	Kalemegdan	2, 11
5	Konak kneginje Ljubice	
6	Kosančićev venac	
7	Topličin venac	
8	Obilićev venac	

== History ==
The line was launched on 1 September 2019 following investments by NIS in partnership with the City of Belgrade. Four electric vehicles were originally launched to serve the route; later that month, the city sought to purchase three more minibuses.
