= International Railway Bridge (disambiguation) =

The International Railway Bridge crosses the Niagara River between Fort Erie, Ontario, Canada and Buffalo, New York, United States

International Railway Bridge or International Railroad Bridge may also refer to:

- Eagle Pass Union Pacific International Railroad Bridge, crossing the Rio Grande between Eagle Pass, Texas, United States and Piedras Negras, Coahuila, Mexico
- Laredo International Railway Bridge 2, crossing the Rio Grande between Laredo, Texas, United States and Nuevo Laredo, Tamaulipas, Mexico
- Laredo–Colombia International Railway Bridge 3, crossing the Rio Grande between Laredo, Texas, United States and Nuevo Laredo, Tamaulipas, Mexico
- Presidio–Ojinaga International Rail Bridge, crossing the Rio Grande between Presidio, Texas, United States and Ojinaga, Chihuahua, Mexico
- Sault Ste. Marie International Railroad Bridge, crossing the St. Marys River between Sault Ste. Marie, Michigan, United States and Sault Ste. Marie, Ontario, Canada
- Texas Mexican Railway International Bridge, crossing the Rio Grande between Laredo, Texas, United States and Nuevo Laredo, Tamaulipas, Mexico

== See also ==
- International Bridge (disambiguation)
