= Postbellum =

Postbellum (Latin for 'after the war') may refer to:

- Any post-war period or era
- Post-war period following the American Civil War (1861–1865); nearly synonymous to Reconstruction era (1863–1877)
- Post-war period in Peru following its defeat at the War of the Pacific (1879–1883). Usually known by its Spanish name posguerra.
- Jus post bellum in Just War Theory
- Post Bellum, a Czech non-profit

== See also ==
- Antebellum (disambiguation)
- Interbellum
- Pre-war (disambiguation)
- Bellum (disambiguation)
