= Classic Six =

Pre-1940 apartment floor plan

Classic Six is a six-room apartment floor plan found in buildings built in New York City prior to 1940. It consists of a formal dining room, a living room, a kitchen, two bedrooms, a smaller bedroom sometimes referred to as a maid's room, and generally two bathrooms. A maid's room is located away from other bedrooms, almost always off the kitchen to allow maids of the past easy access. A typical maid's room also has a small bathroom attached to it.

Classic Six apartments are predominantly found in prewar cooperative buildings concentrated along Central Park West, Park Avenue, and Fifth Avenue on Manhattan's Upper West Side and Upper East Side. Their large square footage, formal room separation, and prewar architectural details such as herringbone hardwood floors, crown molding, and casement windows make them among the most sought-after and expensive apartment types in New York City's co-op market. The room count in Classic Six apartments follows the New York City convention of counting all rooms except bathrooms, with the maid's room included in the total despite its smaller size and separate location within the unit.

The Classic Six is similar to the Classic Seven with the Classic Seven having an extra bedroom.
