= Bellum =

Bellum, Latin for "war", may refer to:

== War ==
- Bellum/Polemos, the daemon of war from Greco-Roman mythology
- Bellum omnium contra omnes, a Latin phrase meaning "the war of all against all"
- Bellum se ipsum alet, a Latin phrase meaning "the war will feed itself"
- Bellum civile (disambiguation), a Latin phrase meaning "civil war"

== Places ==
- Bellum Valley, Oates Land, Antarctica

== Characters ==
- Ms. Bellum, a slightly tall woman from The Powerpuff Girls

== See also ==
- Belum
- Belum Caves
- BELAM
- Bellem, town in Belgium
- Interbellum
- Antebellum (disambiguation)
- Parabellum (disambiguation)
- Postbellum (disambiguation)
