= Belgrade Metro =

Planned rapid transit system in Belgrade, Serbia

Overview
- Native name: Београдски метро / Beogradski metro
- Locale: Belgrade
- Transit type: Rapid transit
- Number of lines: 3
- Number of stations: 59

Operation
- Operation will start: 2033 or later

Technical
- System length: 68.4 km (42.5 mi)
- Track gauge: 1,435 mm (4 ft 8 1/2 in) (standard gauge)
System map
2023 plan for first two lines

The Belgrade Metro (Serbian: Београдски метро/Beogradski metro) is a planned rapid transit system in Belgrade, Serbia currently under construction. The construction of the full metro system has been delayed repeatedly, mostly due to lack of funding.

Belgrade's metropolitan area has a population of around 1.7 million people, making it the largest city by population without a rapid transit system in Europe. Traffic congestion is common and dated infrastructure has put additional strain on the city. At the same time, the suburban railway system BG Voz, which runs underground through the city centre, is only considered to have a role of an S-Train. The construction of a metro is meant to alleviate these problems in the near future.

As a result of the decades of misfortune concerning the construction of the metro system, using play-on-words, Belgrade has been jokingly called "half of a subway" (in Serbian: "metropolis" – metropola; "subway" – metro; "half" – pola), or the project has been humorously referred to as "Waiting for Metro" (Serbian: čekajući metroa), which in Serbian rhymes with the title of Samuel Beckett's play Waiting for Godot (Serbian Latin: Čekajući Godoa), in which the titular character actually never arrives.

== History ==
=== 1920s ===
A subway was mentioned for the first time in 1923. It was envisioned by the first urban plan of Belgrade adopted after an international design competition.

=== 1930s ===
In 1938 the first three routes were proposed: Bulevar kralja Aleksandra-Zemun, Kalemegdan-Autokomanda and Topčider-Viline Vode (Railway station "Dunav"). The Kalemegdan line was planned to be a touristic line, which would be connected with the regular above-ground tracks and continue to Avala, a mountain outside the city. The plans were abandoned due to the outbreak of World War II.

=== 1950s ===
After the war ended, the city's authorities concentrated on reconstructing the demolished urban infrastructure, pushing the introduction of trolleybuses. City planners have contemplated the possibility of introducing a metro to Belgrade's transit system since the early 1950s, but there were no real projects in that direction. Several ideas have been discussed since the 1950s "General Urban Plan" discussions as to how to build the metro. The first proper plan came in 1958, when architect Nikola Dobrović suggested a line that runs along Kalemegdan, Terazije, Slavija, and Čubura.

=== 1960s ===
The first specialised traffic surveys for the purpose of the future subway were conducted in 1965, only three years after the first such surveys were conducted in Chicago. In 1968, a comprehensive plan came about, led by Savo Janjić. The plan envisioned three lines, totaling a length of 33 km (21 mi), with 35 stations. The neighbourhoods, projected for the inclusion in the metro grid were: Zemun, New Belgrade, Zvezdara, downtown, Dorćol, Čubura, Banjica, Čukarica, Palilula, Višnjica with the later addition of Braće Jerković and Dunavski Venac.

According to the city's general urban plan (GUP) in the 1960s, Cvetni trg was envisioned as the location of the future central underground subway station of Belgrade, which would also replace the Belgrade Main railway station. Tunnels would conduct traffic in the north to south direction. However, the railroad authorities opposed the project, so the plans were abandoned.

=== 1970s ===
1976 Belgrade Metro plan

Proper work on creating the metro project began with the tenure of mayor Branko Pešić. In 1972, the decision was made to build the new Belgrade railway junction, which would include tunnels under Vračar and Dedinje. Upon completion of the railway junction, construction of a subway system was planned.

For that purpose, the Subway section within the city administration was formed in the early 1970s, headed by Branislav Jovin, Belgrade's chief urban planner at the time. Jovin, and members of his team, visited Munich, Germany, prior to the 1972 Summer Olympics. Munich was chosen specifically as a city with one of the best traffic schematics in Europe, while its subway, Munich U-Bahn, which was finished in 1971, was constructed using the fastest and most modern techniques of the day.

The Section produced the most comprehensive of all metro plans in 1976. The planners envisioned five different metro lines and four additional regional lines. Over 150 experts worked in the section. Geotechnical and geodetic surveys were conducted before the plans were drafted. First lines were supposed to be Zemun-Vukov Spomenik (via New Belgrade and Terazije; with later extension to Mali Mokri Lug) and Kalemegdan-Autokomanda, and it was planned that they would be finished in eight or nine years. The projected price of the first 14 km (8.7 mi) of metro was €1 billion (in 2009 rates). The other three planned lines were Dorćol-Braće Jerković, Bežanija-Jajinci and Dorćol-Kneževac. From those outer stations, Belgrade would be directly connected via trains with the towns of Zrenjanin, Ruma, Požarevac and Pančevo.

The plan envisioned that Zemun and Terazijska Terasa would be connected by the 1980s, and for that purpose an additional, metro bridge over the Sava was to be built, which would extend from Nemanjina Street. The entire grid was to have 74 km (46 mi) of tracks and 84 stations while the final deadline for the completion of all lines and other planned objects above the ground was 2021.

=== 1980s ===
In December 1981, the plan Metro Belgrade was finished and was presented to the city council in 1982. One of the ideas was that the Soviet Union could build the metro, and in doing so free itself of debt owed to Yugoslavia. This was however opposed by the republics Slovenia and Croatia. Due to their objections, this plan was not carried out.

The city organized a compulsory, self-imposed tax (samodoprinos) charged on the salaries of all employed Belgraders. Set specifically for the construction of the subway, the fund grew to $200 million. In comparison, Vienna, Austria, built its first metro line in 1967 for $100 million. Suddenly, the idea was declared "too expensive" and the chief city executive Radoje Stefanović suspended the original subway construction plan from 1976 in favor of the expansion of the existing Belgrade tram system network in 1982 ("With trams into the 21st century" project). According to architect Dragoljub Bakić, Stefanović summoned the engineers who had worked on the project for 12 years, told them to dig a hole and bury all the metro projects in it.

This brought the first chapter of the idea to build a subway system in Belgrade to an ignominious end. The same project was later re-launched a number of times, but it was used for short-term political gains. In 1986, new chief city executive Živana Olbina restored the subway section.

=== 1990s ===
The economic crisis facing Yugoslavia in the late 1980s became worse in the 1990s. War in the neighbouring republics and economic sanctions only helped to make things worse. Mayor Milorad Unković rejected the project in 1991 and accepted the concept of the light rail transit (LRT). Yet, discussion of a metro system returned, after the completion of the Belgrade railway junction, in 1995. According to officials' talks on the bridge across the Sava for the metro was planned in 1998.

At first, two underground stations, Vukov Spomenik and Karađorđev Park were opened in 1995 and integrated into the suburban rail system of Beovoz. These are located in tunnels which were constructed for the abandoned metro project and they resemble conventional column metro stations.

Mayor Zoran Đinđić in 1997 revitalized the idea of the full subway, but as he was soon ousted from the office, the new chief city executive Spasoje Krunić later that year suspended the subway section again.

=== 2000s ===
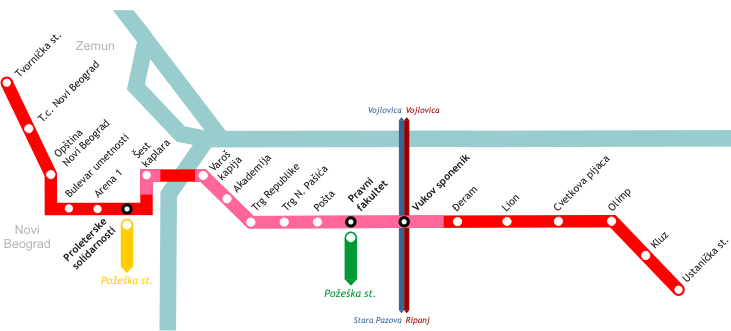
2004 Belgrade Metro plan

On 3 July 2004, the BELAM project was presented to the public. A feasibility study from 2004 estimated that the construction of the full subway would be unprofitable as the city is not growing as much as it did in the 1970s, thus the number of commuters is not growing that much either. The project of LTR, partially above and partially under the ground was favored. Price is also taken in account as the study claimed that the LTR line Zemun (Tvornička street)-Konjarnik (Ustanička street) line would cost half the amount, or some €500 million. The project of LTR was pushed by mayor Nenad Bogdanović. After hiring two companies to do a study; Juginus, a local company from Belgrade, and the Spanish Ineco, a conclusion was reached that a light rail system should be built. Construction was included in the city's new general plan of 2003 and construction was intended to start in 2006. The opening of the first section was due for 2012 with all two lines to be completed by 2021. Ineco projected that the train will go above the ground through the longest street in central Belgrade, Bulevar Kralja Aleksandra, but by 2009 that idea was dropped.

This decision was severely criticized by a large number of urban planners, led by Branislav Jovin, while architects close to city authorities were advocating the construction, resulting in a substantial polarization between the opponents and proponents of the light metro plan. Announcements were made that the construction would start next spring. Yet, this never came, and the plan for the construction of the light railway system inconspicuously faded out.

As time went on beyond 2004, the plan was altered. The light metro was to have three lines. Construction was supposedly set to begin in 2008, with the first line opening in 2013 at a cost of €450 million.

Later, mayor Dragan Đilas returned to the idea of the full metro, contrary to the light version. In late 2008, he announced that a metro along the lines of the 1976 plan would be more likely than a light metro. At the session of the National Council for Infrastructure, the Belgrade Metro is, according to the Minister of Infrastructure Milutin Mrkonjić, the third most important project in Serbia, after road and railway networks. Though the Metro became a national issue, there were still no definite plans.

In 2009, a Russian delegation visited Belgrade and a loan of €500 million for the subway was arranged. However, it failed as Belgrade had no finished project. It was announced that it will take at least two years to finish the project and whether it will be the full or the light metro was still not decided.

=== 2010s ===
==== 2010–2013 ====
In 2010, it was stated that the construction of the metro would begin in two years. The first line would be an east–west line, going above ground in Novi Beograd and underground in the centre and neighbouring districts. The second line was planned from north to south, going underground in the centre through the already-constructed tunnels. The two lines would cross in the city centre near the incomplete main railway station Beograd Centar (Prokop).

Funding has not been allocated for the project yet, but it is expected that French or Russian funding sources will be used.

In November 2011, it was stated that the metro would be built with close cooperation/assistance from French companies. The Egis Group would produce an overall metro concept for the city, while the company Alstom envisaged being responsible for tracklaying, electrification, signalling equipment and rolling stock. Again, it was also announced that construction would start in two years.

Some sources say that the system will initially have 36 km (22 mi), and 55 stations, while others say it will have 15 km (9.3 mi) and 25 stations. The average speed should be 28.2 km/h (17.5 mph). The construction work should take 10 years, as was previously estimated, with each kilometer (0.6 miles) costing some €60 million.

In December 2011, the French government talked about allocating €1 billion worth of credit for financing the construction of the metro.

In 2011, it was said that the first metro line was expected to open in 2017 and run from Ustanička street in Central Belgrade to Tvornička street in Zemun.

==== 2014–2019 ====
In 2014, Belgrade's Mayor Siniša Mali talked about the construction of the metro starting by 2016, and that even the French government may support the building and financing of the subway. In 2015, he stated that the price would be from €800 million to €1.1 billion, but in 2016 increased it to €2 billion.

As of July 2017 nothing had been completed on any of the projects and the metro was still on hold. Instead, a new plan was announced on 3 July 2017, which envisions first two lines as the 22 km (14 mi) long Makiš-Mirijevo (via Sava Amphitheatre and Karaburma) and the 19.8 km (12.3 mi) long Zemun-Ustanička. Construction was supposed to start at the end of 2019 or the beginning of 2020 and was to be finished in three to four years. Unlike any of the previous projects, the metro was to be complement the existing rail system BG Voz, including the transfer of passengers. The pre-feasibility study is to be conducted by the Egis Group. The plan is that the study will take nine months to complete and then the main project is to be drafted. The project also differs from all the previous ones as it sets the crossing of the major lines under the Belgrade Waterfront on the Sava bank, a highly controversial pet project of President of Serbia Aleksandar Vučić and mayor Mali, instead under the central city squares of Terazije or Republic Square as planned in the previous decades. Mali also announced that the first line is actually going to be Makiš Field-Mirijevo (that is, Višnjičko Polje). Architects and engineers reacted negatively, especially since both terminuses are at the moment nothing more than still un-urbanized heaths, though mayor Mali said that this line will connect the future projects which will "with the development of metro, bring billions of euros in investments and millions of square meters of the new business areas". Dr Ratomir Vračarević, traffic engineer and professor at the University of Belgrade's Faculty of Technical Sciences said how the surveys showed that this direction has a very low number of potential commuters, well below the profitability level. He added that we still don't know how much of it will go below or above the ground and the Belgrade Waterfront section is going to be costly in general, especially if it goes underground because the area had been built on a landfill. Branislav Jovin, who authored the 1970s subway project, said that everything in the city is being subordinated to the Belgrade Waterfront. He addressed the right of 1.65 million inhabitants of Belgrade who deserve more to have a metro instead of the, still non-existing, population of Belgrade Waterfront, as not one building has been done yet. As the project is made as an ultra luxurious complex for the rich, Jovin asked "do you really believe that people who live in those luxurious apartments will commute via metro?". He also believes that Makiš was chosen because of the announced project of Tesla Grad ("Tesla City") by Bogoljub Karić, Karić, a tycoon who fled the country so that he wouldn't be trialed for financial schemes, returned after the change of government and announced the "Tesla Grad", a business-residential complex in the Makiš Field. The critics also pointed to the fact that Makiš is the major water purification facility in Belgrade and made negative remarks on mayor's assessment that his SMART plan is the "first serious survey" on the subject. Some architects, like Marin Krešić, openly called the Makiš project "pesty".

Stanko Kantar, head of the city's rail transportation section defended the new, meadow-to-meadow, orientation. He basically disputed the 1976 study calling numerous parts of it an error: population density, directions with highest number of commuters, bad connection of the traffic changing points, distance from the proposed stations. He added that Makiš is good because there is enough space for a depot, station and parking and that city will "make money" because the price of the surrounding land will grow. He added that the old study is also bad because it was allegedly made for the projected city of 3 to 3.5 million people while projections set number of 1.9 million by year 2033. Architect Jovin called the entire explanation a manipulation. He claims that Belgrade had 1.4 million people at the time, that grid was made for the city of 2 million and that "distributive journey" envisioned by the plan actually allows for 80% of the inhabitants to arrive from any point A to point B in maximum 30 minutes. He also asserted that the methodology used for the 2017 project (number of passengers, projected loading) was abandoned in Europe right after World War II and remarked that people who made the plan, in general, are not experts on the matter.

Mayor Mali issued a statement in February 2018 saying that "nowhere in the world the subway is built in densely populated sections of the city". This caused a massive public mockery of his statement in social media, while experts published maps and explanations refuting his claim. Criticism of the pushed Makiš-Višnjica route continued. Members of the Serbian Academy of Sciences and Arts, transportation engineer Dušan Teodorović and a public transportation expert Vukan Vučić disapproved the project. Vučić said that the projected crossing of two lines at Belgrade Waterfront is pointless because both the main bus and railway stations will be dislocated from that position. Teodorović asserted that investors and city administration draw all sorts of lines (metro, railway, etc.) like children do with the markers. Nenad Kecman, executive manager of Serbian Railways, stated that this is the only case in the world where the metro is not connected to any railway stations. Former head of Belgrade's Urban Institute and architect Borislav Stojkov also pointed to the disconnection of the planned system with the other routes of the urban transportation and a fact that professionals from the field were not consulted.

In February and March 2018 the future metro was one of the focal points of the city government in the campaign for the local elections in Belgrade. Fast construction of the metro was promised and the slogan "as quick as saying 'metro'" was coined. Celebrities were enlisted to promote it and buy the tickets for the future subway. After winning the elections, later in March the city administration announced a new spatial plan which prioritized a whole series of other projects and pushed the construction of the metro. The new schedule included finishing the paperwork and starting of the first phase of the first line (Makiš-Ada Huja or Mirijevo) in 2027; finishing of the second phase of the first line (e.g., completing it), finishing the paperwork for the second line (Ustanička-Zemun) and beginning its construction in 2033.

The timeline was changed once again in June 2018 when the city parliament adopted a new plan. It envisioned drafting the plan in the next 27 months, beginning construction in 2020 and ending the first line by 2022. Still, deputy mayor Goran Vesić stated that he is not optimistic that the project will be finished as planned. In the mid-2000s complete geological surveys were conducted to examine the Zemun-Ustanička route. For the newly proposed route, no actual surveys of any kind were done, and 1.5 to 2 years are needed for that alone.

In September 2018, the City Assembly of Belgrade approved the incorporation of a public agency called "Belgrade Metro & Rail" with the purpose of coordinating the upcoming metro project. Deputy mayor Vesić reiterated that the entire project will cost €3 billion, with the first phase expected to cost €1.3 billion. The first phase would see the aforementioned Makiš-Mirijevo line only being built up to Karaburma. "Belgrade Metro & Rail" will also handle the existing "BG Voz" infrastructure, as that system will be integrated with the upcoming metro lines along with a connection to Belgrade Nikola Tesla Airport. Construction of the first phase of the project was said to begin in 2020. The total length of the two lines from the first phase should be 42 km (26 mi). Kantar was appointed to head the new metro company. Despite previous arrangements between Serbian and French governments, in April 2019 deputy mayor Vesić announced that the metro will be funded by the Chinese company "Power China" and built in partnership with the city.

Criticism about almost everything about the adopted project continued: routes (starting in non-urbanized areas, missing some of the major streets and medical and university centers, crossing at Belgrade Waterfront instead of in downtown), price (announced by the Egis Group to be €4 billion for the first two lines, €1.8 billion for the first and €2.2 billion for the second), selection of the construction companies without public bidding, lack of numerous studies still needed for the works to be conducted, etc. Deputy mayor Vesić announced that "if everything goes well", the construction will start "by the end of 2020" and that all the needed surveys and studies won't be finished first, before construction commences, but that the project will develop "as it goes". Price turned out to be a major issue. While the same number of lines with roughly the same length was expected to cost €2.2 billion during the previous administration, the estimated price began to grow: €3 billion (mid-2018), €3.6 billion (December 2018), €4.4 billion (June 2019; €2.33 + €2.07).

Critics from the NGO sector pointed out to other troublesome facts about the project, following the statements of transportation minister Zorana Mihajlović, Mali (now a finance minister) and Vesić, after the meeting of the French and Serbian presidents Emmanuel Macron and Aleksandar Vučić. After the meeting, Mali stated that "we are closer to the subway than we have ever been." Concerns include: apparently already chosen French and Chinese contractors even though no official contracts for the actual construction of the subway have been signed; lack of an actual project by the government, as the negotiating with the companies includes the possible routes which are being adjusted to the contractors, not to the transportation problems in the city; still non-existing financial construction; absolute bypassing of all the obligatory legal procedures and total lack of transparency, as the deals are being made in direct conversations between few domestic politicians and foreign companies. On 19 September 2019, it was decided that the Government of the Republic of Serbia, and not the City of Belgrade, will be the investor. The projected finish of the Tesla City project was set for 2030.

==== 2018–2019 project ====
Lines

Two lines were planned, with 43 stations, connected to the BG Voz system. Line 1 should start in Železnik and finish in Mirijevo, while Line 2 will start in Mirijevo and finish in Zemun. It was also proposed that in the future, a third line from Banjica will be built. Deputy mayor Goran Vesić also announced a third line, but from Voždovac to the New Belgrade Railway Station, to connect the system with Belgrade Centre railway station as the first two lines go around it completely. However, transportation minister Zorana Mihajlović said that Line 3 is not the "subject of conversations" with the French companies.

The following metro lines are proposed at Phase 1:

Line	Route	Length	Stations	Notes
L1	Železnik ↔ Mirijevo	21.3 km (13.2 mi)	21	Under construction. Set to open in 2030
L2	Bežanija Depot ↔ Mirijevo	21.4 km (13.3 mi)	24	Under construction. Set to open in 2032
L3	Bežanija Depot ↔ Bio Campus	24.3 km (15.1 mi) (planned)	27	Planned. Set to open in 2036
TOTAL:		64.8 km (40.3 mi)	72	

Stations

Characteristics of the lines and stations include:

- 42 will be fully underground, with the section at Makiš being above the ground
- Lines will connect at Sava Square
- Mirijevo will have a parallel station for both lines
- A tunnel is planned under the Sava river for Line 2

Line 1

Železnik-Makiš marshalling yard-Žarkovo-Bele Vode-Trgovačka Street-Požeška Street-Banovo Brdo -Ada Ciganlija-Belgrade Fair-Mostar-Sava Square-Republic Square-Skadarlija-Dunav Station-Pančevo Bridge-Karaburma railway station-Ada Huja-Karaburma-Mirijevo Boulevard-Mirijevo Gymnasium-Mirijevo

Line 2

Bežanija Depot-Marka Čelebonovića Street-KBC Bežanijska Kosa-Zemun New City-Ugrinovička Street-Filipa Višnjića Street-Zemun Stadium-City Park-John F. Kennedy Street-New Belgrade Municipality-Mercator Center Belgrade-Blok 21-Blok 18-Sava Square-Slavija Square-Manjež-Karađorđe Park-South Boulevard-Gospodara Vučića Street-Cvetkova Pijaca-Zvezdara-Ustanička Street-Mirijevo

Line 3

Bežanija Depot-Surčinska Street-Vojvođanska Street-Dušana Vukasovića Street-Gandijeva Street-IMT-Omladinskih Brigada-Belvil-New Belgrade Train Station-Belgrade Arena-Blok 21-Ušće-Kalemegdan-Students Park-Pioneers Park-Tašmajdan-Vukov Spomenik-Crveni Krst-Vojislava Ilića Street-Ustanička Street-Medaković-Braće Jerkovića Street-Peka Dapčević Boulevard-Trošarina-Banjica-Banjica 2-Bio Campus

=== 2020s ===
In February 2020, deputy mayor Vesić confirmed that construction would start by the end of 2020, but in May he moved the starting date again, saying they were doing everything for construction to start "by the end of 2021". Alstom company announced its project, which includes the new bridge across the Sava, and stated that the construction of Line 1 will take five years. France donated €8.3 million for the feasibility and environmental studies and conceptual design, both of which still have not been done. Minister Mihajlović also lifted the total price to €4.5–5.5 billion. When the contract for drafting the feasibility study was ceremonially signed on 21 July 2020, Mihajlović and Vesić stated that the construction will start in a "year-and-a-half", now claiming the length of 60 km (37 mi) and lifting the price to €6 billion. Mihajlović's ministry then issued a statement saying that this includes the unidentified third line, but that everything is arbitrary anyway as there are no finished studies of any kind yet. The first object, whose construction should start at the end of 2021, should be the depot in Makiš.

In November 2020, minister Mali and French foreign trade minister Franck Riester signed a treaty worth €581 million, which includes funds for the subway. Mali confirmed that construction will start by the end of 2021. Yet another document, a Memorandum of understanding, between Serbian, French (technology, tracks, trains) and Chinese (construction works) side, was signed on 22 January 2021. Belgrade's chief urbanist, Marko Stojčić, announced new starting dates: November 2021 for the Makiš depot, spring of 2022 for the first line, and 2030 as the date when the first two lines will be finished, Line 1 in 2028 and Line 2 in 2030.

In September 2021 the city announced the results of public voting to select the appearance of the cars of the future subway trains, which began in July. Car types were divided into four variants, named "safety", "freedom", "light" and "power". The winner was "safety", in shades of blue. Also in September, architectural design competition for the 16 stations of the first line was announced. They are all supposed to be different, and designed by teams of young Serbian architects. The metro project was opened for public inspection and suggestions for possible changes, ending in September 2021. However, Vesić said that nothing can be changed regardless. Various citizen's organizations and political parties continued to criticize the project, with some organizing counter actions, organizing presentations of how the project should look like. University of Belgrade's Faculty of Civil Engineering stated it is "sharply objecting" the plan, basically objecting to every part of the project, and especially the routes. The experts from the faculty recommended that the original routes should be built, as the proposed ones solely serve the interests of a few investors (Belgrade Waterfront and Airport City Belgrade). It was suggested that investors, on their own, should finance construction of the light rail which would connect their investments with the subway, citing the example of London.

Chief urbanist Stojčić said the project cannot be carried out without the participation of the Faculty of Civil Engineering, but the faculty's teaching staff voted by a majority of over 90% to quit any participation in the project pushed by the city. However, professor Slaven Tica from the university's Faculty of Traffic and Transport Engineering, said that only his faculty is competent and that they have no complaint whatsoever because "they trust their colleagues from foreign companies" who set the routes. The metro appeal commission then announced that they accepted one of the changes proposed by the citizens, a construction of a branch to connect the neighborhoods of Vidikovac, Cerak, Labudovo Brdo and Petlovo Brdo.

On 8 November 2021, the city assembly adopted the plan for the metro. The city government praised the occasion and the project, while the opposition called it the "greatest theft in Belgrade's history" and a project drafted by the politicians, not by the experts, while urbanist Marin Krešić said that he is embarrassed in the name of the entire urbanist guild. The timetable set by the adopted papers is: November 2021, starting of the filling of the Makiš field with 1,400,000 cubic metres (49,000,000 cu ft) of earth; February 2022 – signing of the deal on the depot's construction; March 2022 – signing of the deal on construction of the access roads; July 2022 – signing of the deal on construction of the first line; May 2023 – starting of the construction of the access roads; November 2023 – beginning of the tunnel drilling. Preparatory works in Makiš began on 22 November 2021. Protesters gathered at the location, though they did not prevent work from continuing. Despite referring to the event as a historic day in Belgrade's history, non state or city officials were present when works began.

The Belgrade Metro's deadline was delayed to 2033 in January 2025 as Serbia reallocated its budget to EXPO 2027, to be hosted in Belgrade. A stadium in Surčin will be built for it. Construction of the Metro will proceed at a slower pace until then. In late March 2026, Belgrade's metro authority signed a purchase agreement with Alstom for a fully turnkey metro system for the first 15 kilometer segment, to be delivered within five years. It is unclear if this agreement will supersede all the arrangements Belgrade formalized with vendors previously.

== See also ==
- Belgrade Light Metro
- Belgrade tram system
- BG Voz
- Beovoz
- List of rapid transit systems
