= Post-war =

Period shortly after a war, usually World War II

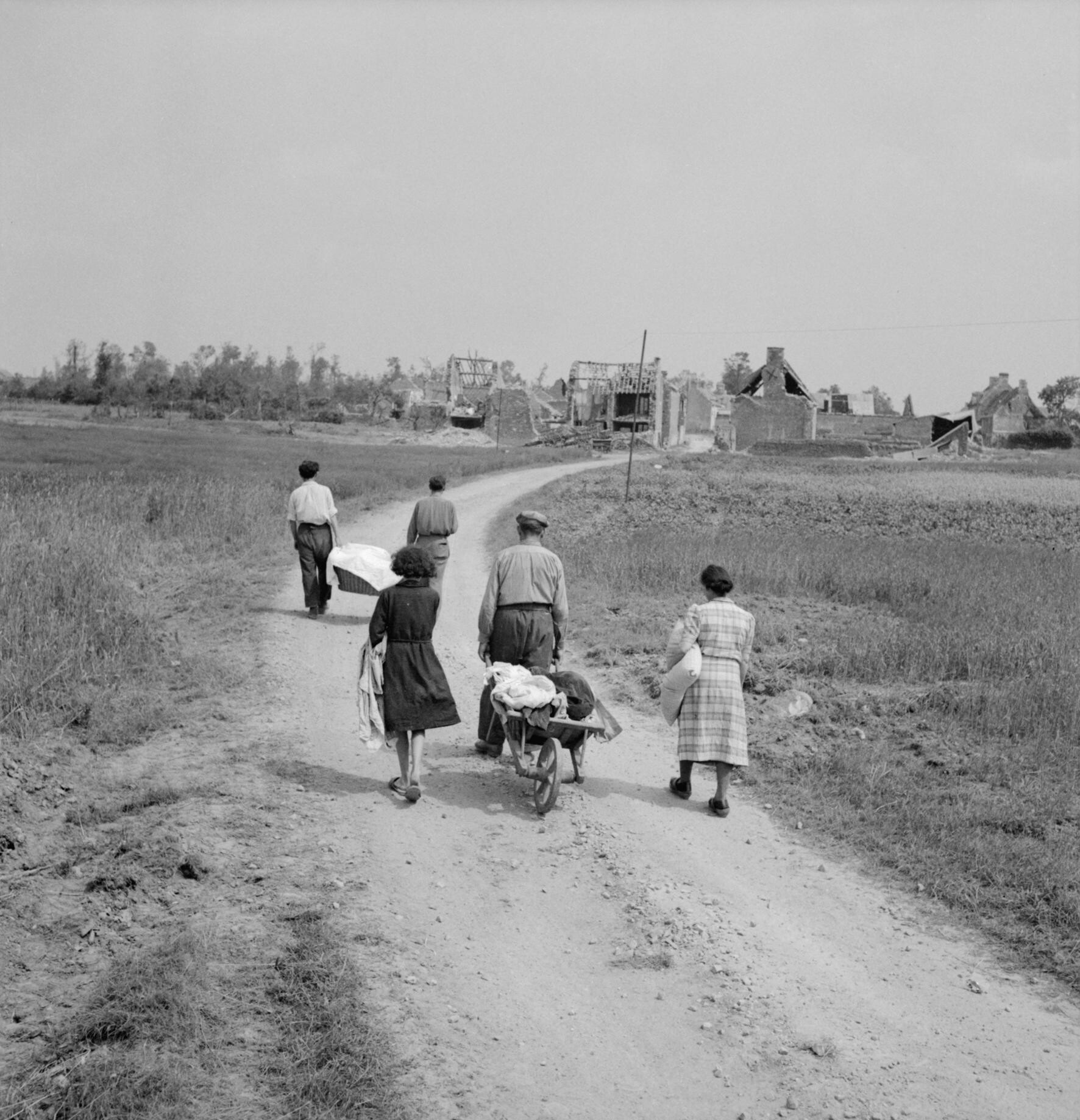
A French family returns to their village, Buron, northwest of Caen, which was completely destroyed during fighting, 18 July 1944.

A post-war or postwar period is the period immediately following the end of a war. The term usually refers to a varying period of time after World War II, which ended in 1945. A post-war period can become an "interwar period" or "interbellum", when a war between the same or mostly similar parties resumes at a later date (such as the period between World War I and World War II). By contrast, a post-war period marks the cessation of armed conflict entirely.

== Post–World War II in the United States ==
=== Chronology of the post–World War II era ===
The aligned countries in the northern hemisphere: NATO in blue and the Warsaw Pact in red

The term "post-war" can have different meanings in different countries and refer to a period determined by local considerations based on the effect of the war there. Considering the post-war era as equivalent to the Cold War era, post-war sometimes includes the 1980s, putting the end at 26 December 1991, with the dissolution of the Soviet Union. The 1990s and the 21st century are sometimes described as part of the post-war era, but the more specific designation "post–Cold War era" is often appended to distinguish the period running from the fall of Communism up to the present day. Some examples of post-war events are in chronological order:

==== Cold War (1947–1991) ====
The Cold War was a geopolitical conflict between the capitalist and liberal "democratic" United States, the communist and authoritarian Marxist–Leninist Soviet Union, and their respective allies: NATO and the Western Bloc for the United States, and the Warsaw Pact and the Eastern Bloc for the Soviet Union. Although both sides did not fight each other directly, both engaged through various proxy wars. At the height of the cold war, both superpowers manufactured and deployed thousands of nuclear weapons to target each other's key economic, military, and political centers. Each superpower's buildup and demonstration of nuclear strike capabilities lead to an unofficial military doctrine known as mutual assured destruction (MAD). The doctrine of MAD prompted leaders on both sides to believe that victory following a full-scale nuclear exchange was simply impossible as the destruction on both sides would be insurmountable. Towards the end of the Cold War, a period of détente culminated in the easing of tensions, bans on nuclear testing, and the destruction of various quantities of nuclear stockpiles. The Cold War began to come to an end in 1989 with the overthrow of Communist governments across Eastern Europe in the Revolutions of 1989 which was followed shortly after by the dissolution of the Soviet Union in 1991, leaving the United States the world's sole superpower.

==== Korean War (1950–1953) ====
On 25 June 1950, after years of tension between communist North Korea and democratic South Korea, North Korea coordinated a series of surprise attacks against strategic points between the 38th parallel. Soon US-led United Nations forces joined the war on behalf of South Korea, expelled the North Korean invasion, and then invaded and nearly captured North Korea. In response, Chinese forces entered the war on behalf of North Korea and pushed the US, South Korean, and UN forces back to the 38th parallel. After 3 years of advances and retreats nearly five million people died. To this very day there are still border disputes between the two Koreas.

==== Civil rights movement (1954–1968) ====
In the 1950s, African Americans faced discrimination and segregation throughout the United States, mainly due to the Jim Crow laws, and particularly in the American South, where many could not even vote. In 1954, the Supreme Court ruled unanimously in Brown v. Board of Education that racial segregation in public schools was unconstitutional. By the end of the 1950s, fewer than 10 percent of Black children in the South were attending integrated schools.

==== Vietnam War (1955–1976) ====
The Vietnam War was fought between the communist state of North Vietnam, supported by the Soviet Union, China, and the Eastern Bloc, and South Vietnam, supported by the United States and SEATO. This war is especially brutal due to North Vietnamese regular forces and Viet Cong insurgents in South Vietnam adapting to guerrilla fighting and ambush tactics against the South Vietnamese military and the United States Armed Forces. Vietnam was one of the first wars to be broadcast to television. Many American civilians and soldiers were opposed to the war due to the condition and many thought the war was pointless. Finally after many protests the United States slowly withdrew from Vietnam due to public backlash.

== Post–World War II in the United Kingdom ==
In the United Kingdom, "post-war" is a term used with cultural, political, and economic dimensions:

- culturally
  - is a term commonly used in the arts and architecture, as it is worldwide. It is primarily and especially before the ascendancy of Pop Art and overlapping "post-modernist" "1960s" movements. Its end is complex due to its archetypes of the 1950s contrasting with leading developments in avant-garde music genres and in popular art, becoming to some audiences mainstream, before 1960. Its movements such as continued functionalism and brutalism were overtaken by the, definitively raucous, counterculture of the 1960s, dominating as the decade wore on. Later resurgences to its stress on quite basic forms were common such as postmodernism and minimalism.
- politically and economically
  - at its broadest, is the period from the election of Clement Attlee in 1945 general election to that of Margaret Thatcher in the 1979 general election, the so-called post-war consensus.
  - at its narrowest, usually with precise or contextual qualifiers, it is the war's direct aftermath; this prompted social solidarity, unprecedented high capital, particularly inheritance taxation, internationalism, the decolonization of the British Empire, the founding and endowing of the National Health Service all amid relative austerity particularly rationing. Hardships in capital taxation, and of rationing, faded due to global recovery, technological advances and consumerism enabled and encouraged from the late 1950s such as under the four-successive leader Conservative government, 1957–1964. These set a social norm for a majority of out-of-town journeys in private rather than public transport and private housing preferred over public housing, continued (with minor abatement) through alternating governments of the next two decades.

== See also ==
- Interwar period
- Pre-war (not a synonym for interwar when referring to World War I)
- Post–Cold War era
- International order
- Aftermath of the September 11 attacks
