= Classic Seven =

Pre-1940 New York City apartment floor plan with seven rooms

Classic Seven is a seven-room apartment floor plan found in New York City residential buildings constructed prior to 1940, typically in prewar cooperative or rental buildings on the Upper West Side, Upper East Side, and Morningside Heights neighborhoods of Manhattan. The floor plan comprises a living room, a formal dining room, a kitchen, three bedrooms, a maid's room or staff room, and two or more bathrooms. The Classic Seven is considered an extension of the Classic Six floor plan, distinguished by the addition of a third bedroom.

== History ==
The Classic Seven floor plan emerged during the late nineteenth and early twentieth centuries as New York City's prewar residential construction boom produced large, formally organized apartment buildings designed for upper-middle-class and wealthy families. These buildings were constructed primarily along Central Park West, Riverside Drive, Park Avenue, and Fifth Avenue, where cooperative apartments and luxury apartments with generous room counts were marketed to households that employed domestic staff.

The designation "Classic Seven" is a colloquial term used in the New York City real estate market rather than a formal architectural classification. It distinguishes floor plans by total room count, a convention shared with the Classic Six, Classic Five, and related prewar designations. Room counts in this convention include all primary living spaces but exclude bathrooms.

By the mid-twentieth century, changes in domestic labor patterns reduced demand for dedicated maid's rooms, and many Classic Seven apartments were renovated to convert the staff room into a home office, nursery, or additional guest room. The room's physical location off the kitchen — a defining characteristic of the original layout — typically remained unchanged even after repurposing.

== Layout ==
A standard Classic Seven floor plan contains the following seven rooms:

1. Living room — the primary reception space, typically the largest room, often featuring decorative fireplaces and hardwood floors
2. Formal dining room — a dedicated room for structured meals, separated from the kitchen by a hallway or pantry corridor
3. Kitchen — originally designed for use primarily by domestic staff; often equipped with a secondary service entrance
4. Bedroom 1 (master) — the largest sleeping room, usually with an en suite or immediately adjacent bathroom
5. Bedroom 2 — a secondary bedroom of comparable or slightly smaller size
6. Bedroom 3 — a third bedroom, which differentiates the Classic Seven from the Classic Six
7. Maid's room — a smaller, self-contained room located off the kitchen, historically occupied by live-in domestic staff

In addition to the seven primary rooms, Classic Seven apartments typically include two or more bathrooms. The maid's room commonly has a small attached bathroom or water closet that is counted separately from the main apartment bathrooms and excluded from the room count.

The spatial organization of a Classic Seven reflects the domestic service infrastructure common to prewar New York households. Service corridors, back-of-house kitchen access, and the physical separation of the maid's room from the main bedroom wing were deliberate design features that allowed household staff to circulate without passing through formal entertaining spaces.

== Relation to other Classic floor plans ==
The Classic Seven is one of several prewar New York City apartment designations organized by room count:

| Designation | Room Count | Key Difference |
|---|---|---|
| Classic Five | 5 rooms | No dedicated dining room or maid's room |
| Classic Six | 6 rooms | Adds formal dining room; one fewer bedroom than Classic Seven |
| Classic Seven | 7 rooms | Adds third bedroom relative to Classic Six |
| Classic Eight | 8 rooms | Adds library or additional bedroom |

The primary distinction between a Classic Six and a Classic Seven is the addition of a third bedroom. This makes the Classic Seven the most common configuration sought by larger families requiring the formal room layout of a prewar apartment while maintaining three separate sleeping rooms.

== Market characteristics ==
Classic Seven apartments are among the least common prewar configurations on the Manhattan resale market. The combination of three bedrooms with a formal dining room, maid's room, and generous bathroom count places them in the upper tier of prewar cooperative inventory. Listings for Classic Seven apartments regularly appear on the Upper West Side in buildings along Central Park West and Riverside Drive, and on the Upper East Side along Park Avenue and Fifth Avenue.

The scarcity of Classic Seven inventory relative to demand historically supports price premiums over comparable postwar three-bedroom apartments. Prewar co-op boards, architectural detail, ceiling height, and room proportion contribute to persistent buyer interest in this floor plan type.

== See also ==
- Classic Six
- Cooperative apartment
- Prewar architecture
- New York City real estate
- Maid's room
