= Bulevar kralja Aleksandra =

Street in Belgrade, Serbia

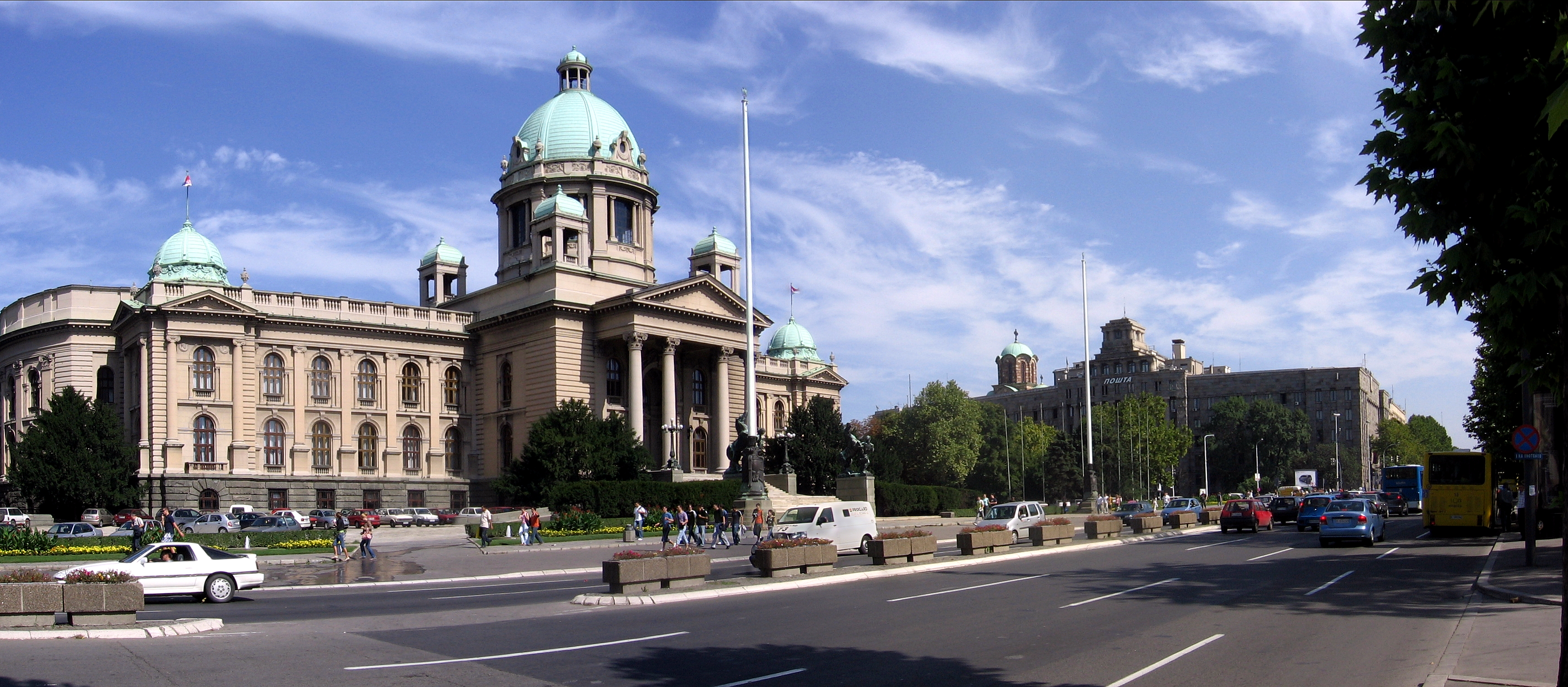
- House of the National Assembly and the headquarters of the Pošta Srbije, at the beginning of the Bulevar
- Interactive map of Bulevar kralja Aleksandra
- Native name: Булевар краља Александра (Serbian)
- Former names: Bulevar kralja Aleksandra (1896–1945); Bulevar Crvene Armije (1945–1952); Bulevar Revolucije (1952–1997)
- Namesake: Aleksandar Obrenović
- Length: 7,500 m (24,600 ft)
- Location: Belgrade

Bulevar kralja Aleksandra (Serbian Cyrillic: Булевар краља Александра, "King Alexander Boulevard") is the longest street entirely within the urban limits of Serbian capital Belgrade, with length of 7.5 kilometers. Known for decades after World War II as Bulevar Revolucije (Serbian Cyrillic: Булевар Револуције, "Boulevard of the Revolution"), although, Belgraders are simply refer to it as the Bulevar (Serbian Cyrillic: Булевар, "Boulevard), although there are 20 boulevards in Belgrade.

== Location ==
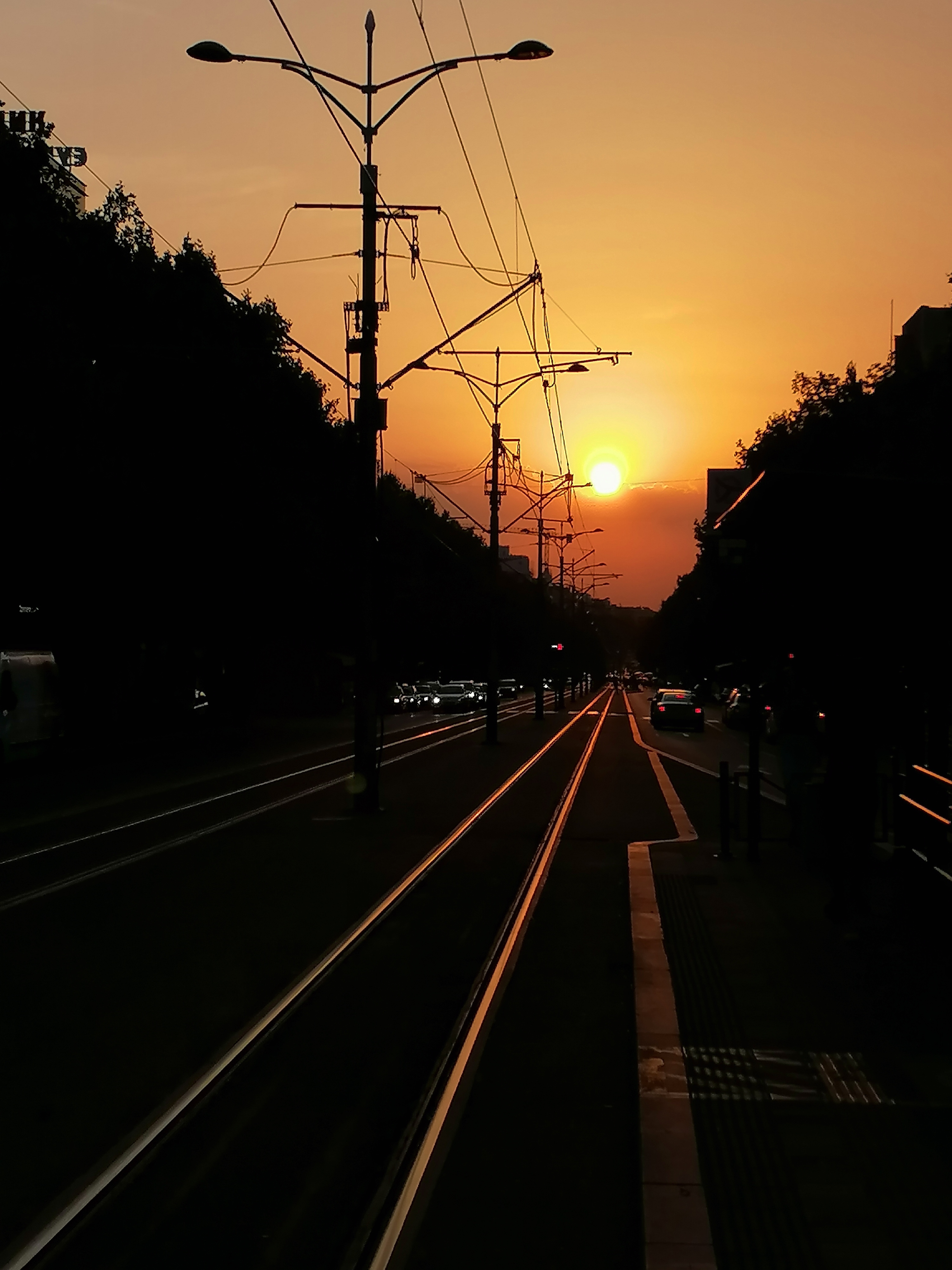

Due to its length, Bulevar stretches through four out of eight urban municipalities in the old section Belgrade: Stari Grad, Palilula, Vračar and Zvezdara, in which the main part of the Bulevar is located. Starting at the Square of Nikola Pašić, it goes for the most part in a south-east direction, curving only near the end, in the neighborhood of Mali Mokri Lug, after which the Bulevar extends into the road of Smederevski put, which connects Belgrade with the city of Smederevo.

== History ==
=== Antiquity ===
Location of the boulevard was always important for the traffic. In Roman period, it was a starting section of the 924 kilometers long Via Militaris, which connected Singidunum, predecessor of Belgrade, and Constantinople, and in more local terms, Singidunum with fortresses and settlements along the Danube border of the Roman Empire, like Viminacium. Built in the 1st century AD, the road was six meters wide, with rows of shops, forges and arsenals, while Romans were buried along the road in stone sarcophagi. Archeological remnants of the Roman road can still be seen below the “Depo”, former depot of the city’s public transportation company. Majority of boulevard's course is part of the “Ancient Singidunum” archeological locality.

Singidunum's castrum occupied part of today's Belgrade Fortress, but the civilian zone spread from the Kralja Petra Street, over the both Sava and Danube slopes, till Kosančićev Venac, extending in a series of necropolises from Republic Square, along the Bulevar kralja Aleksandra all the way to the Mali Mokri Lug. During almost every construction downtown where digging is involved, more remains are being discovered. In 2007, on the location of the former kafana Tri lista duvana at the corner of Bulevar Kralja Aleksandra and Kneza Miloša Street, several necropolises were found. Just across, in Pioneers Park, there is Archaeological Site Pionirski Park. When the underground garage was dug, 19 tombs were discovered. The entire Singidunum was surrounded by vast necropolises and the main with the largest ones stretched along today's boulevard, where numerous graves, grave steles and sacrificial altars were discovered.

=== Later history ===
In Ottoman period, Turks built a major cemetery in the lower part of the modern boulevard, spreading from Batal mosque (location of the modern House of the National Assembly) to Tašmajdan. During this period, the route of the Bulevar was a famed Tsarigrad Road (Constantinople Road), officially bearing that name to 1849. There were stations (menzulana) along the road, where the horses could be replaced, and which also served as the post offices. On Belgrade section there were stations in Mali Mokri Lug (Meyhane of Nadži-Ašik-Mihailo), Boleč and Grocka. The fourth was near Smederevo.

=== 19th century ===
When the Ottomans regained Belgrade in October 1813, after the collapse of the First Serbian Uprising, their advance guards burned wooden hovels in Savamala neighborhood, engulfing the city in smoke. When the main Ottoman army landed, a large number of people got stranded on the bank in Savamala, trying to flee across the Sava into Austria. Men were massacred, while women and children were enslaved. All over the city heads on a spike appeared, and people were impaled on stakes along all city main roads, including the Tsarigrad Road. Rows of impaled people were placed along the road, from the Batal mosque to Tašmajdan.

In the mid-19th century, near the modern crossroads with the Takovska Street (named Ratarska then), was where city ended at the time, and the fields began. The Batal mosque was located there, giving its name to the developing neighborhood, but in Serbian version, Bataldžamija. The mosque itself was demolished after the 1862 Ottoman bombing of Belgrade, making the buildings behind it visible, but the name Bataldžamija for the neighborhood survived into the early 20th century. Ruling prince Mihajlo Obrenović was often visiting the area and made plans for the mosque. He had idea of reconstructing it and moving the State Archive in. He was assassinated in 1867, before his plans were conducted.

Kafana Valjevo was located where the Czech embassy is today. At the crossroad was the house of the Savić family, used as a medical facility and across it was the Marić pharmacy. Next to the pharmacy was a curvy road which was leading to the Tašmajdan cemetery. The cemetery wasn't divided into parcels, but had numerous narrow, crossed paths, grown into bushes. This was also the location of Fišeklija, a series of gunpowder stores, where gunpowder was sold in fišeks, cone-shaped bags made from waxed paper. The stores developed in the second half of the 19th century, after Prince Miloš ordered for gunpowder stores to be removed outside of the city due to the safety reasons. Belgrade's major flea market, Bitpazar, was located in Dorćol. After the 1862 bombing, the flea shops from Bitpazar scattered all over the city, until 1887 when they were ordered by the city to group along the Fišeklija Street. It was recorded that the merchants were forbidden to sell any "oldies" unless they disinfect it in the "Institute which exists for that" and for which they will be charged "small tax".

Already in 1880, city newspapers were reporting on the bad condition of the Tašmajdan cemetery. The burial lots were purchased in the Saint Mark's Church, which became quite wealthy, but the cemetery was neglected. Also, as the land was owned by the church, city administration had no interest into arranging the cemetery itself. Part of the cemetery on the side of the Takovska, belonged to the Catholics and the Lutherans. The hill in the direction of modern Seismology Institute was allocated for the graves of soldiers, drowning victims, suicides and non-Christians in general, except for the Jews, who had their own cemetery. Newspapers described the cemetery and the surrounding area as the "shelter for rascals and danglers, who tear the flowers, steal monuments, defile graves with slurs and in other ways, so that cemetery is an abomination of Belgrade where there is no any piety for the deceased".

As the city expanded, cemetery became inadequate. One the one side, it became too small for the function of the city’s main graveyard. On the other, once projected to be on the outskirts of the city, as Belgrade grew, Tašmajdan practically became downtown and close to the Royal court. The first official initiative for the removal of the cemetery came in 1871 from Mihailo Jovanović, Metropolitan of Belgrade. As the city was in the financial crisis at the time and wasn’t able to buy such a large lot for the new cemetery, mayor of Belgrade Vladan Đorđević donated a patch of his land to the city for the purpose of establishing a new cemetery. Though the Belgrade New Cemetery became operational in August 1886, the reinterment of the remains from Tašmajdan dragged on for the several decades, being finished only in 1927.

As population settled along the road, gradually it became a street, originally known as Sokače kod zlatnog topa ("Alley at the golden cannon"). It was later renamed to Markova ("Marko's Street"). The major gunpowder magazine was located in the abandoned and derelict Batal Mosque, but as the town was expanding, the magazine was relocated and the small gunpowder shops were open instead so in 1872 was renamed to Fišeklija. There was also a large khan next to the mosque. In 1896 it was renamed to "Smederevski put" ("Smederevo Road") and later that year it was renamed after then ruling Serbian king Aleksandar Obrenović, the last from the Obrenović dynasty. Despite being one of the most unpopular modern Serbian rulers, when he was overthrown, new king Peter I Karađorđević from the rival Karađorđević dynasty didn't change the street's name.

Because of the vicinity of the cemetery in Tašmajdan, there were many shops of funeral equipment and stonecutters. Small shops in time evolved into larger facilities, mostly selling old and cheap goods for the poorer citizens. Mostly owned by the Jewish merchants, these second hand shops formed the predecessor of modern flea markets, stretching along the street to the location of modern Law Faculty. That's where the horse race track began, occupying area along the road to the modern Vukov Spomenik. Above it were the tram sheds, where later the Depo was built. Again, this was the eastern edge of the city, with only few edifices further than this point. The house of the quilt maker Laza Mitić, in the center of the orchard on the slope to the stream of Bulbulderski Potok, and Antulina Vila, surrounded by vineyards, were the only two edifices in this area until 1910.

=== 20th century ===
The first automobile repair shop in Belgrade was open in the Bulevar. It was situated among the blacksmith shops and second-hand shops, in the commercial zone. Owned by Tričko Puškar, it was opened several years after the first automobile arrived in Belgrade on 3 April 1903 and was located a bit down from the kafana "Tri lista duvana". At the beginning of the 20th century, a location for one of outer railway stations was selected along the street. The railway never reached the boulevard, and on the chosen parcel the building of the Belgrade University Library was built in the 1920s.

In the early 20th century, the road was partially paved with cobblestone and the linden tree avenue was planted. The sidewalks were paved with large stone slabs, which were later, when the sidewalks were paved with the asphalt concrete, placed on the Kalenić market where they still stand as of 2019. There was a riding track between the pedestrian sidewalk and the carriageway. After 1918, construction of highrise began around Vukov Spomenik, extending in the direction of Cvetkova Pijaca. By this time, the flea market ceased to exist. In the 1920s and 1930s, after the cemetery was closed and relocated to the New Cemetery and Tašmajdan was gradually turned into the park, so as construction of the Saint Mark's Church (1940) and the building of the General Post Office (1938), the road became a proper modern and urbanized street.

Other important buildings and objects along the street, built during the Interbellum, include Belgrade University Library (1926), Students' Residence King Alexander I (1927), Park of Ćirilo and Metodije (1928), Building of the Technical Faculties (1931), Faculty of Law (1937), Monument to Vuk Karadžić (1937). Library, Technical Faculties and the building of the faculties of Mechanical Engineering and Technology and Metallurgy behind them, in the Kraljice Marije Street, form sort of the college town within Belgrade. Monumental Library and Technical Faculties were designed by Nikola Nestorović in the style of romanticized academism with the touch of secession. Facades and ornaments were work of Branko Tanazević, Ilija Kolarević, Ivan Lučev and Bedrih Zeleni. After World War II, another floor was added, designed by Mihailo Radovanović. Construction of the massive building of the National Assembly at the beginning of the street, which began in 1907, was finished in 1936. Sculptural group "Black horses at play", work of Toma Rosandić, were placed at the main entrance of the assembly in 1938, facing the boulevard.

The neighborhood around the crossroads of the boulevard and Grobljanska (today Ruzveltova) Street became known as Kamenović, after the kafana of the same name. The venue was located in the boulevard, between Molerova and Stiška (today Golsvordijeva) streets. After the monument to Vuk Karadžić was built, the area gradually became known as Vukov Spomenik (Serbian for Vuk's monument), and old name, Kamenović, went out of use soon after World War II.

The technical faculties complex was mostly built from 1932 to 1955. Though there is an inner yard between them, the buildings gravitate to the outer streets and are, for the most part, not interconnected. The complex covers 59,000 square metres (640,000 sq ft). In September 2021, the government announced construction of the new building, with 22,000 square metres (240,000 sq ft) and 7,000 square metres (75,000 sq ft) of garage space, which will connect all existing buildings and provide new, additional space. The urban overhaul of the entire complex was also announced, and the project is to be selected by March 2022. The design was selected in April 2022, but apart from two buildings towering over the side, Karnegijeva Street, the appearance of the complex facing the boulevard will remain the same.

The first traffic lights in Belgrade were placed at the crossroad of the boulevard and Takovska Street, in November 1939. It was planned to place them at every busy crossroad in the city, but the outbreak of World War II prevented this. The second traffic light was placed at London, only in 1953.

In the building of the Czechoslovak embassy, Yugoslavia signed capitulation in June 1941, after the Axis attack in World War II. In 1943, as part of the strategic bombing campaign within the scopes of the oil campaign against Nazi Germany, the U.S. began massive bombardment of the oil fields and refineries in Romania, known as the Operation Tidal Wave campaign. On their return, as Belgrade was important strategic point, the bombers threw their unused bombs on the city. German occupational forces dug several pools across the city to storage water for extinguishing the fires. The largest such pool was built along the Bulevar, between the buildings of the Main Post Office and National Assembly, where part of the Takovska Street is today. In time, citizens began to use the pools for swimming and the Germans didn't try to stop them. In order to keep the appearance of normal life during occupation, Germans even organized a water polo match between the German soldiers and local youth. After the war, some swimming competitions were held in this pool by the new authorities, but the pool was ultimately re-filled by 1950.

After the war, plans were made which were to completely change the appearance of the boulevard in the Tašmajdan-Vukov Spomenik section. They mostly included complexes of massive, robust buildings. During the Interbellum, the University Center was planned. After the war, the idea was changed to the House of the Central Committee of the League of Communist Youth of Yugoslavia after the war, the building was originally envisioned as the "largest congress center in the Balkans". Construction began in the summer of 1949 as part of the vast program of the Youth work actions, but the works ceased in November 1950. The building was envisioned as the massive structure, which was to have a pedestrian pathway to the Saint Mark's Church, and to "dominate this part of the city" as the "etalon of the new architecture's superiority". After the idea of the congress center was abandoned, architect Dragiša Brašovan revised the plans and adapted the structure as the highrise hotel. Construction works were continued in 1954 and, though they were finalized in 1958, the hotel was opened for guests on 20 August 1957.

A massive building of Arts Museum was planned in Tašmajdan. The 1948 architectural design competition was won by Nikola Dobrović, but then it was decided his design is "formalist, excessively massive, and fortress-like". Miladin Prljević was given the task of reducing the project, so he downsized it from five huge buildings to two, one to exhibit paintings and sculptures, and the other for medieval collection. This was still deemed too expensive and it was decided to form a park instead. The construction of the park began in 1950, and it was ceremonially opened in May 1954. A concert hall was planned across the University Library. Architect Branko Bon was the design competition in 1949, and though the permits were issued in 1950, the construction never began due to the lack of funds. A generic high rise for the Federal Construction Chamber, designed by Slavko Levi, was built in 1960 instead.

In Communist Yugoslavia after World War II, the Boulevard was first renamed "Bulevar Crvene Armije" ("Boulevard of Red Army" or "Red Army Boulevard") in 1945 and then “Bulevar Revolucije” in 1952. In 1997 the name was switched back to its pre-war form. In 1958, "Gorica", one of the first modern supermarkets in Yugoslavia (after the one in Cvetni Trg), was opened at No. 82. It was operational for 45 years, until "Lilly Drogerie" moved in during 2003, which subsequently vacated the venue in 2021. During the period of Yugoslav Wars and sanctions against Yugoslavia in the 1990s, the sellers of the used and cheap goods were selling it on the sidewalks and on the hoods of the cars, turning part of the street into an open flea market again.

=== 21st century ===
First phase of a major renovation of the Bulevar started in August 2006. To date first 1.5 kilometers of the street has been completed. The next phase will start as a part of constructing light rail system in 2008.

In February–July 2010, a complete reconstruction of most of the Bulevar was conducted. All installations were replaced, new pavement, sidewalks and traffic lights were constructed. Also, tram tracks were transferred to the center of the street, rather than to be located partially in the middle and partially along the sidewalks. Electrical grid for the trams was also replaced and LED lamps were introduced for new LED street lighting. However, reconstruction of that magnitude was to include cutting and replacement of the Bulevar’s 2.5 kilometers long avenue which constituted of 423 plane trees. Public outcry resulted in protests and physical obstruction of cutting, so that in some instances police had to intervene. City had to change some of the original plans: they bought more mature seedlings than those they originally planned, they planted 61 trees more than they cut and the modern way of watering the trees is introduced. In the spring of 2014, former city manager Aleksandar Bijelić, and several of his collaborators, were arrested and indicted, in connection with the negotiations for the 2010 reconstruction which cost 1.7 billion dinars (€16.8 million). They were accused of inflicting a damage to the city worth 650 million dinars (€6 million). By March 2020, the Court of Appeals quashed the prosecutor's indictment two times, also overturning the decision on Bijelić's 11-month long custody.

On 30 August 2021, city assembly voted to erect a monument to Mihajlo Pupin in the boulevard, in front of the Technical Faculties building, at number 73. On the same day, the small green area at number 84, was named Park of Milan Oklop, after the writer Milan Oklopdžić. The park was previously unnamed, but was unofficially called Poštanski park, "Post Office Park", due to the post office located there.

== Names ==
- Via Militaris (33 AD-Middle ages)
- Tsarigrad Road (Carigradski drum; Middle ages-1849)
- Alley at the golden cannon (Sokače kod zlatnog topa; 1849-?)
- Marko's Street (Markova ulica; ?-1872)
- Gunpowder Cartridge Street (Fišeklija; 1872-1896)
- Smederevo Road (Smederevski put; 1896)
- King Alexander Boulevard (Bulevar kralja Aleksandra; 1896-1945)
- Red Army Boulevard (Bulevar Crvene armije; 1945-1952)
- Revolution Boulevard (Bulevar revolucije; 1952-1997)
- King Alexander Boulevard (Bulevar kralja Aleksandra; 1997–present)

== Sections ==
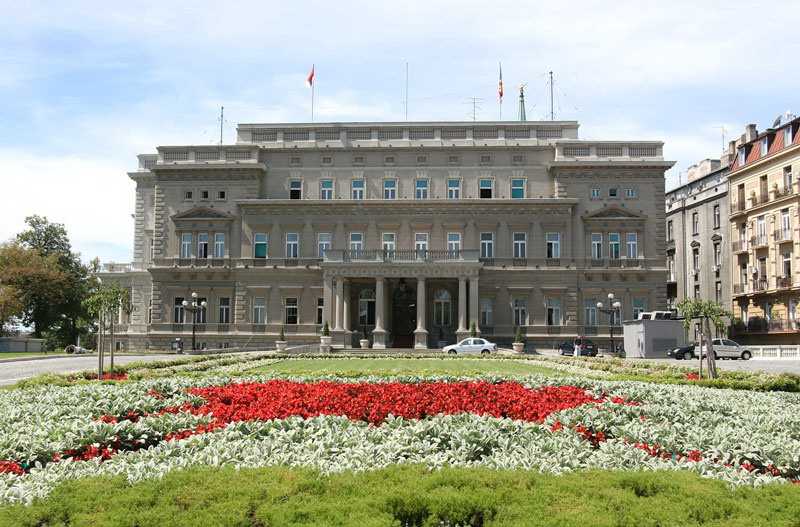
Stari Dvor (Belgrade City Hall)

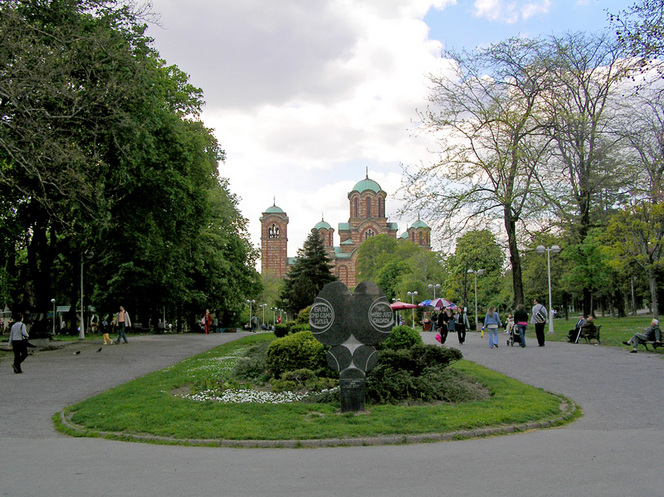
Tašmajdan park

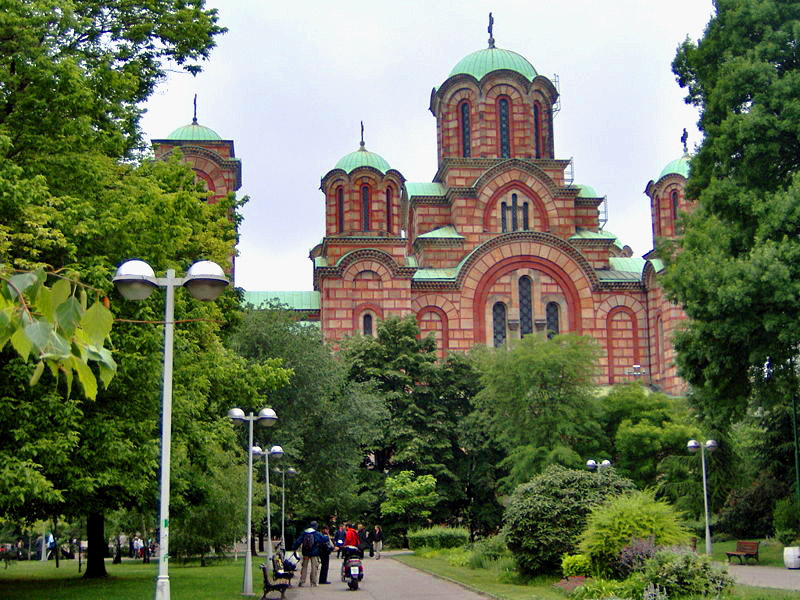
St. Mark's Church

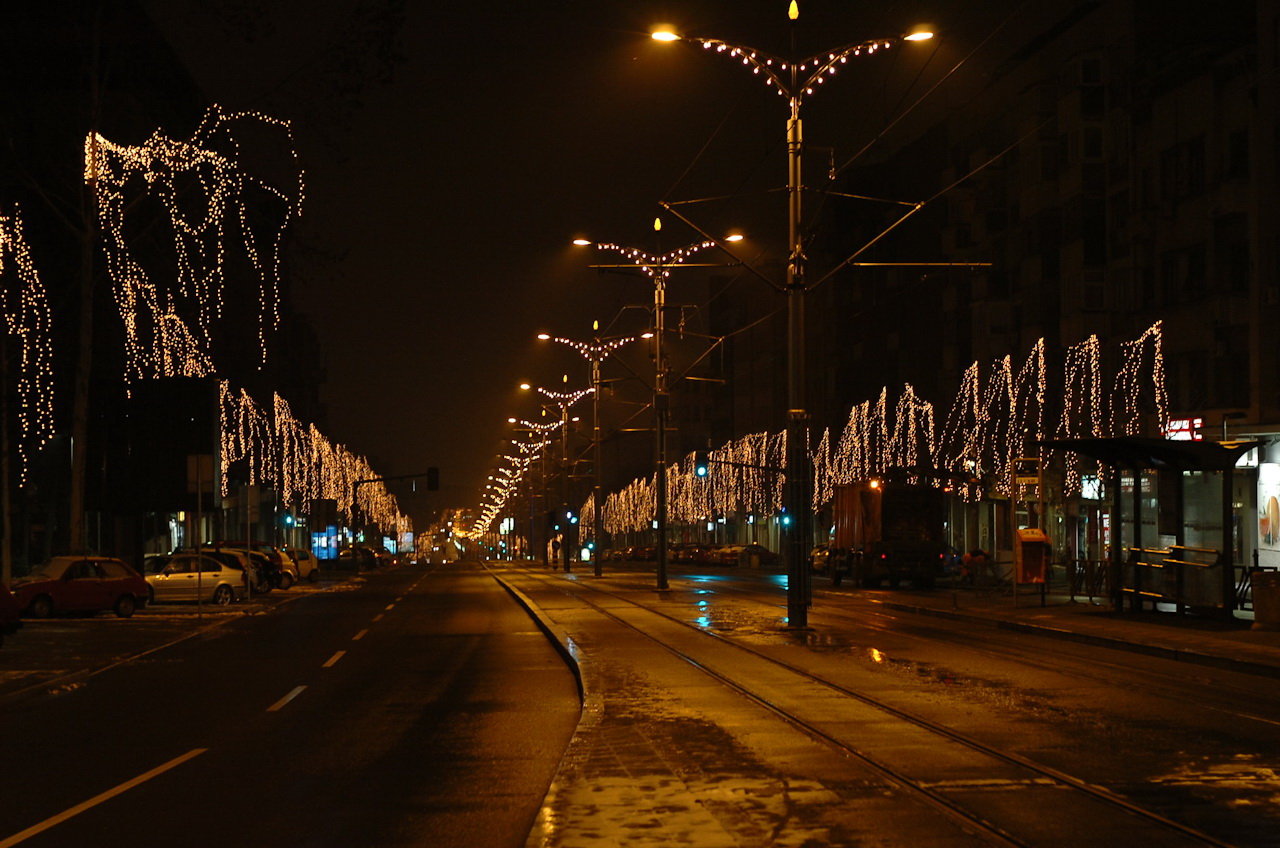
Boulevard by night

The first section of the Bulevar, from its beginning to the crossroads with the Takovska and Kneza Miloša streets, is located in the municipality of Stari Grad. The Bulevar begins from the large fountain on the Nikola Pašić Square. The entire left side of this section is occupied by the monumental building of the House of the National Assembly, while on the right side is the Pioneers Park, and buildings of the Stari Dvor (Belgrade City Hall) and Novi Dvor (which houses the office of the President of the Republic (Andrićev Venac) behind it. There is a park surrounding the assembly building, covering 0.91 hectares (2.2 acres).

The next section, until the crossroad of Vukov Spomenik, is divided between the municipalities of Palilula (left side) and Vračar (right side). The left side is occupied by the main building of the Post Office of Serbia, Constitutional Court of Serbia, Air Serbia terminal, St. Mark's church (declared a cultural monument), Tašmajdan park, Seismological Institute Building, famous restaurant "Madera", the University of Belgrade Faculty of Law (work of Petar Bajalović, a culture monument), Metropol Hotel Belgrade, Belgrade University Library and Technical faculties. The residential building at No 63, built in the first decades of the 20th century in the Academism style has been also declared a culture monument. The entire section is declared a "protected complex of Old Beograd".

The right side is mainly residential and commercial, apart from the building of the Embassy of the Czech Republic. Building of the embassy is a place where Yugoslav government signed capitulation to Nazi Germany on 17 April 1941 and during the war itself, the building was diplomatic center for this part of Europe and place from which the dispatches were sent to Berlin. A new ultra-modern commercial building is being built on the corner of Kneza Miloša street, formerly kafana "Tri lista duvana" (Three tobacco leaves). The collective residential building at No 46, built in 1930, is a work of Aleksandar Janković, in the Modernist style. It was badly damaged in Luftwaffe's bombing of Belgrade on 6 April 1941, but later reconstructed and built-on in the 1950s and included into the "protected complex of Old Beograd".

At the crossroad and underground station of Vukov Spomenik begins the Zvezdara section of the Bulevar. It runs through the neighborhoods of Đeram, Lipov Lad, Lion, Zvezdara, Cvetkova Pijaca, Zeleno Brdo and Mali Mokri Lug. This part is mostly residential and commercial, with some important facilities located in the Bulevar: Municipal assembly of Zvezdara, open green markets of Đeram, Cvetkova pijaca and Mali Mokri Lug, "Kluz" clothing factory, roundabout of a dozen buses and tramway lines and industrial zone Ustanička (Electrical industry "Nikola Tesla", "Utenzilija", foundry "Livnica", presses of "Glas Javnosti", etc.).

After Cvetkova Pijaca, the boulevard narrows to only two lanes, and from this point further the street wasn't maintained and reconstructed as it was in the former sections. City announced widening of the street, relocation of the tram tracks to the center and different traffic organization, just like in the lower sections. However, when works were announced in January 2023, it became evident that the present street will just be refurbished as it is. As in some sections there are even no sidewalks, as there is no room, fatalities among the pedestrians are relatively frequent. After the project was announced, residents and some political parties protested and organized petition for expansion of the boulevard in January 2023. Citizens were also worried that the widening will never happen, as more and more highrise were built along this section of the street, replacing small houses.

City abruptly withdrew plans, announcing they have been working for few months on the revitalization of old plans which included widening of the street, and relocation of the tram tracks from Cvetko to the Ustanička tram terminus. Numerous smaller structures on the right side of the boulevard will be demolished. The next section, Ustanička-Mali Mokri Lug, will also be expanded from two to four lanes, but city quit on extending tram tracks to Mali Mokri Lug. Works will not begin before 2024.

== Characteristics ==
The oldest still operational sweetshop in Belgrade, "Pelivan", is located in the street, at No. 20. It was founded in 1851 by Mustafa Pelivan, a Gorani from Dragaš. Mustafa gathered the initial capital winning at the wrestling competitions. The original shop was located where the modern Staklenac shopping center is today, on the Plateau of Zoran Đinđić section of the Republic Square. He was succeeded by his son Malić Pelivanović. The shop became quite distinguished by that time: they supplied the Karađorđević Royal Court with halva, Malić was elected a deputy at the National Assembly and Nobelist Ivo Andrić wrote about the pastry shop in "Signs along the road". After his son Azir took over, he educated generations of pastry chefs from all over Serbia. The old shop was destroyed during the German bombing of Belgrade on 6 April 1941, but Azir immediately opened a new one, on the present location. Today, the fifth generation of the family still owns and manages the shop, and the recipe for the famous Pelivan ice cream is still secret.

The Bulevar is one of the most important traffic routes in Belgrade. For the most part it has tram tracks for the city public transportation lines, over 40 public transportation bus and tram lines pass through the sections of the street, and it also contains one of the most important BG Voz stations, Vukov Spomenik. On the other side, despite its length and traffic importance, there are no lines of the third type of city transportation in it: trolleybuses.

Municipality of Zvezdara began an initiative to erect a monument to the King Aleksandar Obrenović somewhere along the street. The bust was dedicated in the late 2004, in the square between the municipal building and the Students Residence King Alexander I, though there were suggestions that the monument should be relocated to the Pioneers Park, where the king was assassinated.

A popular Serbian movie named after the Bulevar, "Bulevar Revolucije" was made in 1992. Directed by Vladimir Blaževski, it starred Bojana Maljević and Branislav Lečić.

=== Depo ===
The depot was originally built in 1892 as the city's first garage and workshop for the public transportation vehicles. It is the location from which the very first tram in Belgrade, drawn by horses at the time, went on its maiden voyage on 14 October 1892, when the line Kalemegdan-Slavija was established. After World War II it kept its purpose, as a garage of GSP Beograd, the city public transportation company.

In the 1990s, with the deterioration of the economic system in Serbia and imposed sanctions, the sidewalks of the Bulevar became the gathering place for the street dealers of all sorts of goods that were unavailable in official stores. They were especially known for selling cigarettes, jeans, cookware, flowers, etc. Similar development caught the neighborhood of Zeleni Venac too, and they both became synonymous for the black market during the 1990s. In order to move the illegal sellers from the streets, the city adapted depot into the closed, fair-like shopping center "Depo", with 160 market stalls, in 1996. Sellers were for the most part removed from the street after 2000, selling mostly cloths and cosmetics.

The object burned to the ground on 23 August 2014 due to the bad electrical installations. All market stalls, with the complete stocks of all sellers burned. Mayor of Belgrade Siniša Mali promised that the halls will be rebuilt and that sellers will return to the object. The attempt to relocate the sellers to the Đeram market was unsuccessful as the process dragged for several years and the adapted location ("Depo 2") was deemed inappropriate by the sellers, so they refused to move in and asked for depot to be reconstructed. Out of 80 stalls provided on the Đeram, only 10 worked for a while. Apart from the reconstruction, several other possibilities were mentioned, including the turning of the reconstructed object into the museum of city transport (already proposed in 1996), which was a proposition of the Institute for the protection of the cultural monuments as Depo is under the preliminary protection. Other propositions, endorsed by the Institute, included a museum, art gallery, craft studios, etc.

In August 2016 city changed the general urban plan and envisioned the commercial facilities, including a hotel, which was a sign that the Depo will not be reconstructed or preserved. On 28 August 2017, mayor Mali announced that city decided to sell the entire lot, which covers 4,316 m^{2} (46,460 sq ft) on which city allows the construction of a commercial-residential complex. The set price is €4 million. Object No. 4, the only one that didn't burn in 2014, has a transformer and a rectifier which still supply the tram's overhead wires. For that reason, the city will retain the authority over the object.

Official version of the cause of fire was soon replaced by the rumors that the fire was set on purpose so that lot can be sold. City refuted those stories claiming that Depo will be rebuilt, in one way or another, as personally confirmed by the mayor of Belgrade Siniša Mali a month after the fire. Yet, it was declared an "extra economic zone" and offered for sale. Since the fire investigation had to be concluded in order for city to sell the lot, reporters asked the prosecutor's office for information. In October 2017, the prosecutor stated how investigation concluded that the 3 years old fire wasn't anyone's fault but refused to disclose any documentation saying that it might compromise the process if the office eventually decide to start the investigation again in the future. But on 9 October city announced that the lot was already sold for €4.125 million. The buyer, Israeli company "BKA Development" was registered in Serbia only on 26 September, or less than two weeks prior to the selling of Depo. The "BKA Development" is a joint venture of two Israeli companies, "Yossi Avrahami" and "Almogim Holdings", which already purchased the lot of the former US embassy in Belgrade, in the Kneza Miloša street, and was founded with the initial capital of only 100 dinars (€0.83). The constructed object can cover no more than 14,000 m^{2} (150,000 sq ft) and half of the lot and have a maximum of 6 floors.

The investor announced the beginning of the construction for 2018, but that didn't happen. In the summer of 2018 city announced a drafting of the plan for the much wider area of 1.2 ha (3.0 acres), which occupies the block between the streets of Sinđelićeva, Niška, Sredačka and Bulevar kralja Aleksandra. The first draft was announced in February 2019, allowing the construction of three more floors in Depo (8 floors plus the attic), and lifting the total number of apartments in the block from existing 175 to 400, thus elevating the number of residents from 500 to 1,100. In April 2020, the "BKA Development announced they didn't "give up" on the project nor postponed it for 2021, but not disclosing when or what they plan to build. The remains of the structure were demolished on 17–18 August 2021. The planned complex will be called "Landmark Residence". Construction began in July 2022, under the name "Depo Residence". Completetion was planned for 2024.

== See also ==
- List of streets and squares in Belgrade
- BELAM, defunct project

== Sources ==
- Serbian Wikipedia article
- Municipality of Zvezdara page on the Bulevar
