= Parabellum =

Parabellum may refer to:

== Music ==
- "Para Bellum", a song from Hate Eternal's 2008 album Fury & Flames
- Si Vis Pacem, Para Bellum (album), the eighth studio album by South African rock band Seether
- Para Bellum (album), a 2025 studio album by American thrash metal band Testament

=== Bands ===
- 9mm Parabellum Bullet, a Japanese rock band, formed in March 2004 in Yokohama
- Para-Bellum, a Russian band that competed to represent at the Eurovision Song Contest 2010
- Parabellum (Colombian band), an extreme metal band from Medellín active in the 1980s
- Parabellum (French band), an alternative rock and punk band that formed in 1984

== Weaponry ==
- 7.65×21mm Parabellum, a pistol cartridge that was introduced in 1898
- 9×19mm Parabellum, a rimless, centerfire, tapered firearms cartridge
- Luger pistol (also Pistole Parabellum or Parabellum-Pistole), a toggle-locked recoil-operated semi-automatic pistol
- Parabellum MG 14, a 7.92 mm caliber World War I machine gun built by Deutsche Waffen und Munitionsfabriken

== Other uses ==
- John Wick: Chapter 3 – Parabellum, a 2019 American neo-noir action thriller film

== See also ==
- Si vis pacem, para bellum, a Latin adage translated as "If you want peace, prepare for war"
- Parabola, a U-shaped plane curve
- Bellum (disambiguation)
- Para (disambiguation)
- The dictionary definition of bellum at Wiktionary
- The dictionary definition of para at Wiktionary
