= Pelivan, Belgrade =

Pastry shop in Serbia

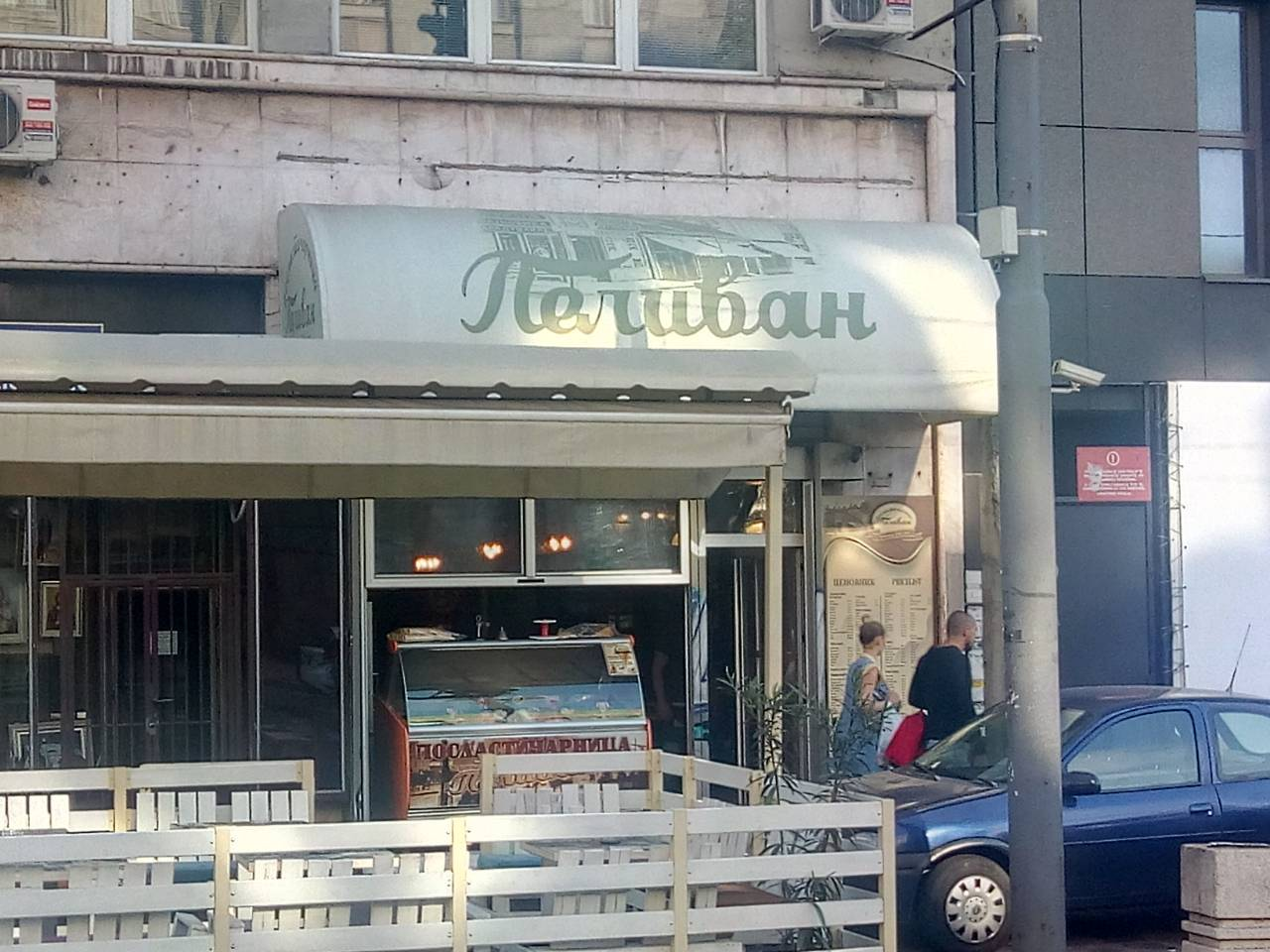
Pelivan in October 2018

The Pelivan (Serbian Cyrillic: Пеливан) is an Oriental-style pastry shop in Belgrade, the capital of Serbia. One of the best known pastry shops in Belgrade, it used to supply the Serbian Royal Court with pastry while the Nobelist author Ivo Andrić wrote about it. The "Pelivan" was founded in 1851 and is the oldest still operational pastry shop in the city, working under the same name and owned by the same family since foundation. With the kafana Znak pitanja, it is among the oldest surviving foodservice venues in the city.

The shop became a synonym for the Belgrade supreme pastry and, especially, ice cream, which is often described as the best in Belgrade - "why do you say Pelivan if you mean ice cream". It has been named as one of the rare remaining "historical threads" which connect modern city with the period of the Defenders of the Constitution (1842-1858) and a "tradition which survived two royal dynasties, Communism and several states".

== Location ==
The shop is located at 20 Bulevar kralja Aleksandra. It is situated near the crossroads of the Bulevar, Takovska and Kneza Miloša streets, right across the building of the General Post Office and the Constitutional Court of Serbia. The shop itself is bounded by the new, vacated building on the right, and the embassy of the Czech Republic on the left. The empty building was a location of once famed Belgrade kafana "Three tobacco leaves". Opened in the 1880s, it was also noted for the first telephone exchange in Belgrade, which was installed in the venue. Across the street, in the northeast direction are the St. Mark's Church and the Tašmajdan Park. The Pioneers Park and the House of the National Assembly of the Republic of Serbia are also in the vicinity.

== History ==
=== Origin ===
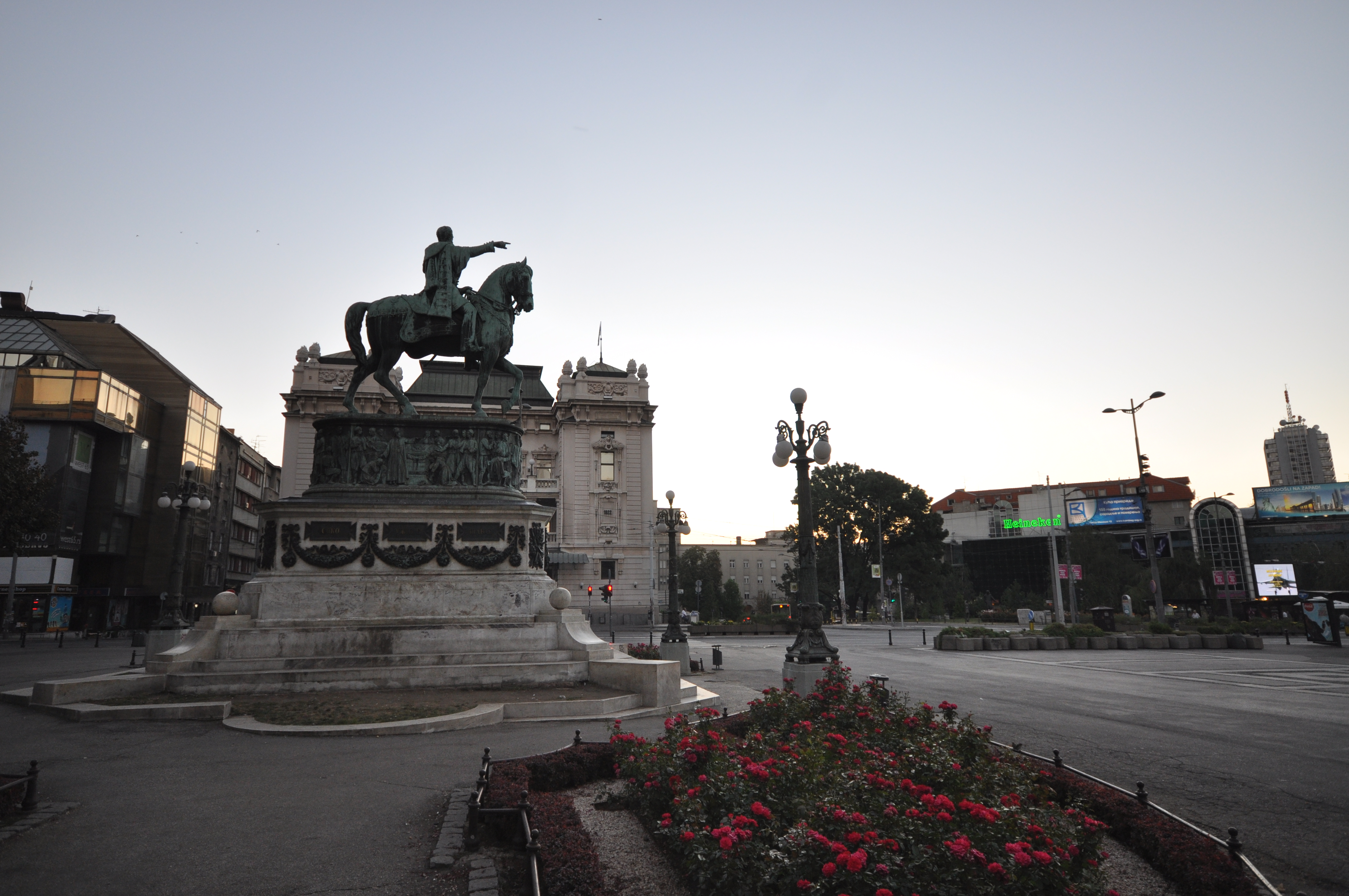
The glass Staklenac shopping mall in the central right section of the photo is the location of the original Pelivan shop

Mustafa Pelivan, who founded the shop, was a Gorani, who originated from the village of Zli Potok, near the small town of Dragaš in the region of Gora, south of Prizren. He arrived in Belgrade as a wrestler, or pelivan, as they were called at the time, which he took as his family name. Pelivan acquired the initial capital winning at the wrestling competitions. He was declared the "best wrestler in Serbia" and won a significant prize after defeating "some Turk", which he invested in the pastry shop. At the time, wrestling meant that the participants would "put on the leather (under)pants, oil themselves and wrestle". Gorani people, Islamized Slavic population, in general are known as excellent pastry and sweets chefs. When opened on 24 May 1851, his shop was one of only few in Belgrade. Pelivan used to mix ice cream in the bucket filled with ice.

=== Old shop 1851-1941 ===
The original shop was located close to the Stambol Gate. At the time the neighborhood was known as Zerek, or upper section of the Dorćol neighborhood. It was situated where the modern Staklenac shopping center is today, on the "Plateau of Zoran Đinđić" section of the Republic Square in downtown Belgrade. In 1868, 17 years later, a monumental building of the National Theatre in Belgrade was built almost across the shop. The business was growing and two more shops were opened. Pelivan was succeeded by his son, Mehmed Pelivanović and then by his grandson Malić Pelivanović. The venue became quite distinguished in time. The shop supplied the Karađorđević Royal Court with halva and was awarded a Royal certificate of the Kingdom of Yugoslavia in 1936. The family itself gained prominence and Malić Pelivanović was elected a deputy to the Parliament of Yugoslavia after World War I.

=== Present shop from 1941 ===
After Malić, his cousin Azir Pelivanović (d.24 May 1994) took over. He served ice cream in Belgrade in scoops for the first time. The old shop was destroyed during the German bombing of Belgrade on 6 April 1941. Azir immediately decided to start from scratch and on 22 August 1941 he opened a new one, on the present location. The production was fully restored by the end of 1941. After the war ended, Azir managed to acquire the newest ice cream machines from Italy and concocted the famous recipe. He was fearful that the new Communist authorities might take the shop from him in the massive wave of nationalization which they conducted. They stripped him of the ownership of the land in the Slavija neighborhood and detained him for a while. The lot on Slavija had a house which Azir planned to use for another shop. Further expansion of the business was halted by the authorities but in time members of the new Communist elite, not only local from Belgrade but also from Croatia and Slovenia, became regular customers. Azir also dedicated himself to education of generations of pastry chefs which started their own businesses all over Serbia and Yugoslavia. Popular story says that after he caught his nephews paying the lottery tickets with the money from the till, he forced them to saw their pockets.

Navali narode, evo boza, limunada, sladoled, baklava, ima još, ko da groš, dušu sladi, umor vadi!
"Gather people, here is boza, lemonade, ice cream, baklava, there is more, who gives a groschen, sweetens his soul, heals his tiredness"
Shop's old commercial tagline

New golden age of the "Pelivan" was from the 1950s to the early 1980s. By 1980, the shop was selling 250 kg (550 lb) of ice cream and 600 L (130 imp gal; 160 US gal) of boza daily. The kafana "Three tobacco leaves", next to the "Pelivan", was demolished in the late 1980s in order to make way for the new Hotel Hilton, but due to the ensuing wars, the project was scrapped. For a while there was a mounted parking until the new, modern building was built in the 2000s, which remained empty. Due to the economic collapse of the state, the shop was in dire financial situation in the late 1980s and the 1990s. As criminal bloomed, just like with numerous other venues, the shop became pray of the racketeers. Azir's daughter Seija and her husband Ahmad al Šukeir, who moved from Syria to Belgrade in 1980 to study medicine, headed the shop in this period.

With the political changes in the 2000s, the period of botched transition began, which deprived many people of jobs and incomes, so the business remained unpredictable, but gradually began to improve. In the 2010s, the youngest generation took over the business, Suhaib al Šukeir (b.1982) and his brothers Bara and Musab, sons of Seija, who died, and Ahmad, who returned to Damascus.

== Venue ==
The ice cream from "Pelivan" is often named as the best in Belgrade. The shop is known for giving ice cream for free on certain dates, marking anniversaries of the shop or commemorating dates from the lives of previous owners.

Author Ivo Andrić wrote about the pastry shop in his work "Signs by the roadside". He described it as the "obligatory stop" in Belgrade. It became a favorite pastry shop of numerous actors, politicians (as the National Assembly is close), writers and tourists, including Danilo Bata Stojković, Nikola Simić and Predrag Ejdus. Stojković was visiting almost every day and was known for bringing order into the row, which at the time stretched into the Kneza Miloša Street. The shop, with its old commercial tagline, is mentioned in the elementary school textbook "Old crafts".

The recipe for the famous Pelivan ice cream devised by Azir Pelivanović is still a secret. It has been passed from one generation to another, only the owners at the time are familiar with it and they personally prepare the compound from which the ice cream is made. Until the 1990s, only relatives were employed in the shop. It was only revealed that in the early 21st century the ice cream making generally shifted to the new technologies (Italian style) and ingredients, which makes the ice cream look and taste more like a paste, but "Pelivan" kept the original milk-and-eggs based recipe.
