= BELAM =

BELAM (Serbian Cyrillic: БЕЛАМ; Serbian: Београдски лаки метро / Beogradski laki metro, lit. 'Belgrade Light Metro') is a defunct plan for a rapid transit system in Belgrade. It was due to begin construction in 2008. It was intended to relieve Belgrade's growing traffic congestion issues, with the first stretch of line opening in 2012. The first line has an estimated cost of 450 million euro, taking some 5 years to complete.

== Concept ==
The idea to construct a rapid transit system in Belgrade originates from the 1950s when it was driven by Belgrade's blooming number of inhabitants and the lack of adequate transport infrastructure. However, the inability to decide between proposals to construct a modern tram system and a classic underground one meant that the project was to stay largely stagnating in years to come. The political turmoil of the 1990s and lack of potential funding extinguished further development of the idea.

With the beginning of the 21st century, however, the idea came to life once again, facing similar problems. Despite fierce debates on the most adequate solution, Belgrade's present leadership pressed on with a pre-feasibility study on a light rail system which received a positive review in the late 2001. BELAM, consequently, became an integral part of Belgrade's master plan for 2021. Construction was due to begin in 2006, but was postponed till 2008. Serbian group JUGINUS (Serbian: Jugoslovenski institut za urbanizam i stanovanje - Yugoslav institute for urbanism and living space) and Spanish INECO are in charge of the construction.

Although the project's implementation seems rather certain at this point, fierce criticism by opponents has not ceased. Their main argument remains that the only criterion for choosing light rail over conventional metro was the comparatively low cost. They insist that constructing a light rail transit system will not deal with the capital's transport issues in the long run.

On the other hand, project supporters maintain that the economic aspect is essential. Furthermore, they claim that estimates on maximal usage of the lines cannot exceed 13,000–14,000 passengers/hour (on the busiest stretches), at least not in the next 20 years, whilst the system's capacity maxes out at 20,000 passengers/hour. The possibility of conversion to a conventional metro and easy connections to existing tram lines are, according to the supporters, further arguments in favor of light rail.

There are certain speculations that the project would be abandoned in favor of a conventional metro, if Belgrade's government were to change.

== Lines ==
Belgrade's Master plan for the year 2021 envisions three lines operating within the system. The strict timeline that saw the construction of the third line commencing as soon as 2012 has now been abandoned and the only relatively fixed date has the year 2008 as the dead-line for the beginning of Phase 0 of construction.

=== Line 1 ===
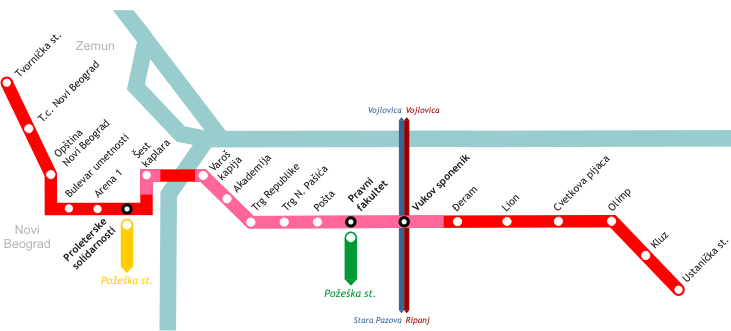
Central line of BELAM

Line 1 – Central line (Serbian: Централна линија / Centralna linija) is to be constructed first. The pre-feasibility study has it denoted as "primary". The overall length of the line should be 12,5 km, with 20 stations (12 overground, 8 underground). The line is intended to start from the Tvornička St. in Zemun, headed towards the municipality of Novi Beograd, and further east, towards the river Sava. After crossing the river over a designated bridge constructed adjacent to the existing one (Brankov most) the line is then planned to enter deep-level tunnels, calling at Square of the Republic and Nikola Pašić Square before moving on in the direction of the University of Belgrade Faculty of Law. From that station onwards, the line should then resurface and would follow the Bulevar Kralja Aleksandra St. terminating at its intersection with Ustanička St. The full list of stations is as follows:

- Tvornička St. (downtown Zemun terminus)
- TC Novi Beograd
- Opština Novi Beograd (Novi Beograd Council)
- Bulevar Umetnosti

(branch for Blok 41 maintenance centre and depot, and Bulevar Umetnosti terminus)

- Arena 1 (adjacent to the recently constructed Belgrade Arena)
- Proleterske solidarnosti (interchange for Line 3 – Savska line)
- Šest Kaplara

(crossing the Sava)

- Varoš Kapija
- Akademija (optional station, dependent on funding)
- Trg Republike (Square of the Republic)
- Trg Nikole Pašića (Nikola Pašić Square)
- Pošta (Main post-office, connection with Faculty of Law station, interchange for Line 2 – Vračar line)
- Vukov spomenik (interchange for Beovoz urban commuter services)
- Đeram
- Lion
- Cvetkova pijaca
- Olimp
- Kluz
- Ustanička St. (terminus)

=== Line 2 ===
Line 2 – Vračar line (Serbian: Врачарска линија / Vračarska linija) would be sharing a station with Line 1 – The Faculty of Law/Pošta station. From here it would work its way to Slavija and Prokop (Belgrade's future Main train station) in deep-level tunnels. It would then proceed towards Belgrade Fair and Hipodrom. Its stations are expected to be:

- Pravni fakultet (Faculty of Law terminus, interchange for Line 1 - Central line)
- Slavija
- Klinički centar
- Prokop (interchange for Beovoz urban commuter services and Serbian Railways mainline intercity and international services)
- Sajam (Belgrade Fair)
- Hipodrom - Topčider (Topčider terminus)

=== Line 3 ===
Line 3 – Sava line (Serbian: Савска линија / Savska linija) would depart from Novi Beograd where it's supposed to share the Proleterske solidarnosti station with Central line, headed for Novi Beograd mainline train station. Afterwards it would proceed across the Sava (in an, as yet, undetermined way, most like it will share a road bridge planned for constructions across the Ada) and would terminate at Banovo Brdo. Planned stations:

- Proleterske solidarnosti (Novi Beograd terminus, interchange for Central line)
- Arena 2
- Novi Beograd train station (interchange for Beovoz urban commuter services, and Serbian Railways mainline intercity and international services)
- Ada Ciganlija
- Hipodrom - Topčider (interchange for Vračarska line)
- Banovo Brdo
- Blagoja Parovića St.
- Požeška St. (Banovo Brdo terminus)

== See also ==
- Belgrade Metro
- Ground-level power supply
