= Borislav Stojkov =

Serbian architect

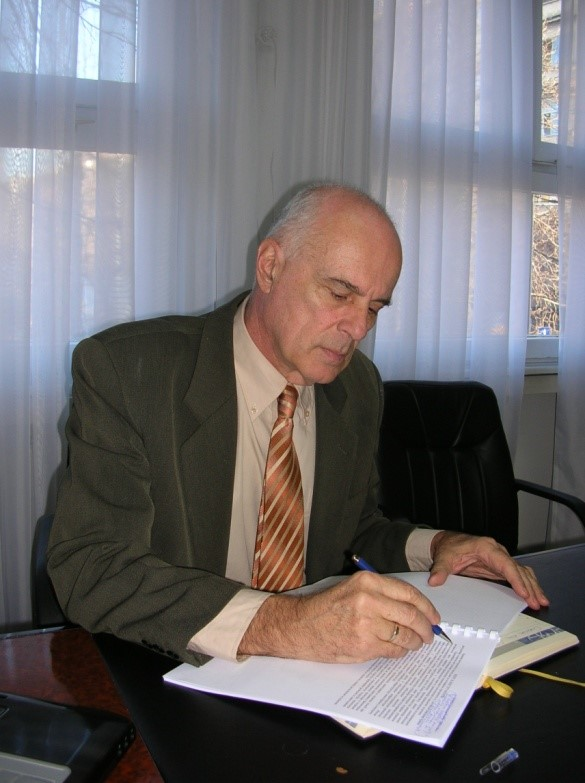
- Borislav Stojkov
- Born: October 17, 1941 (age 84); Belgrade

Borislav Stojkov (born 17 October 1941) is a Serbian engineer of architecture and professor at the University of Belgrade, Faculty of Geography. He is a full member of the Academy of Engineering Sciences of Serbia.

== Biography and career ==
After graduating architecture at the University of Belgrade Faculty of Architecture in 1964, he completed his master studies at the same faculty in 1974 and received his doctoral degree from the University of Sarajevo in 1990. Later, he specialized in regional planning at MIT-SPURS in the United States (1970/71), London (1974) and Gothenburg (Sweden, 1975).

In his professional career he was mostly engaged in town planning from 1966 to 1990, and spatial planning from 1991 to 2015. His scientific engagement was mostly from 1991 until 2017. He was employed at the Institute for the Architecture and Planning of Serbia from 1966 to 1968 and again from 1990 to 2000, Town Planning Institute in Belgrade from 1968 to 1980, the “Invest-biro” company from 1981 to 1989 as its Director, Deputy Minister in the Ministry for Urbanism from 1991 to 1992, and Director of the Agency for Accommodation of Refugees in Serbia from 1992 to 1993. Stojkov was also engaged as a President of the Association of Belgrade Architects from 1984 to 1988, and President of the Association of the Town Planners of Serbia from 1995 to 1999.

He was active in major strategic projects in Serbia and Europe. His teaching career at the Belgrade University – Faculty of Geography took place between 1993 and 2009 when he retired. He also taught at the universities of Trieste, Vienna and Dresden. He represented Serbia in management and steering committees of INTERREG IIIc program in Vienna.

He was engaged in number of juries in Serbia, Croatia and Bosnia and Herzegovina, and also as a member of 5-member jury for UIA Gold Medal in Architecture 1989.

He was one of the three spokesmen for the network of scientific institutions in spatial planning of Central and East/South East Europe, Spa-ce.net (with Prof. Mueller and Prof. Božidar Finka), and coordinator of scientific sector of Academia Danubiana at the Bodenkultur University in Vienna. He is the full member of the Academy of Engineering Sciences of Serbia, and member of associations of architects, town planners and spatial planning of Serbia.

== Selected works ==
Stojkov has published over 150 scientific works, including two monographs.

- Stojkov, Borislav (1992). Metode analize i sinteze u prostornom planiranju [Methods of analysis and synthesis in spatial planning]. Institut za arhitekturu i urbanizam Srbije. ISBN 9788680329024.
- Stojkov, Borislav (2003). Belgrade and its region. University of Belgrade, Faculty of Geography. ISBN 9788682657316.
- Stojkov, Borislav (2003). Mladenovački Selters: strategija razvoja. Geografski fakultet Univerziteta, Institut za prostorno planiranje. ISBN 9788682657293.
- Stojkov, Borislav (2006). Metropolitan Networking in CADSES. University of Belgrade, Faculty of Geography. ISBN 9788682657620.
- Stojkov, Borislav; Trkulja, Siniša; Kovačević, Predrag (2013). "The State of the Southern Subregion's Cities". The State of European Cities in Transition 2013, Taking stock after 20 years of reform. UN-Habitat. ISBN 9789211325416.

== Awards and recognitions ==
Stojkov has received numerous awards and recognitions in Serbia and Europe. He has nine awards in architectural and urbanistic competitions in Serbia and Poland. In the Serbian Urbanistic Salon he achieved Grand Prix and six top prizes and other awards and recognitions. During his career he has received many recognitions and other honorary mentions of professional and social importance such as October Award of Obrenovac, Award of Ministry of Culture in Poland and others.
