= Bellum civile =

Bellum civile, or civil war in Latin, may refer to:

- Another title for Pharsalia by the Roman poet Lucan
- The Commentarii de Bello Civili (Commentaries on the Civil War), telling events of the Civil War until immediately after Pompey's death in Egypt by Julius Caesar. Also, by association, other works on that war that are historically attributed to Caesar, but whose authorship is doubted:
  - De Bello Hispaniensis (On the Hispanic War), campaigns in the Iberian peninsula
  - De Bello Africo (On the African War), campaigns in North Africa
  - De Bello Alexandrino (On the Alexandrine War), campaign in Alexandria
