= Herringbone =

Herringbone may refer to:

- Herring-Bone (card game), a game of patience
- Herringbone (cloth), a woven pattern of tweed or twill cloth
- Herringbone (formation), a type of military formation
- Herringbone (horse) (1940–1961), a Thoroughbred racehorse
- Herringbone cross-stratification, a sedimentary structure in geology that is formed from back-and-forth tidal water flow
- Herringbone gear, a type of gear
- Herringbone pattern, a pattern of floor tiling or paving
- Herringbone seating, a pattern of airliner seating
- A bonding pattern of brickwork, also known as opus spicatum
- Herringbone stitch
- A type of braided hairstyle, which is also known as a fishtail braid
- A distortion pattern from deinterlacing video called mouse teeth
- A method of counting used with the unary numeral system
- A technique of moving one's skis while cross-country skiing
- Herringbone milking shed
- Herringbone, another name for the medical condition scintillating scotoma
- "Herringbone", a song by Department of Eagles from In Ear Park, 2008

== See also ==
- Herring, the fish whose bones are the namesake of the "herringbone" pattern
