= Archaeological Site Pionirski Park =

Coordinates: 44.8112°N 20.4636°E

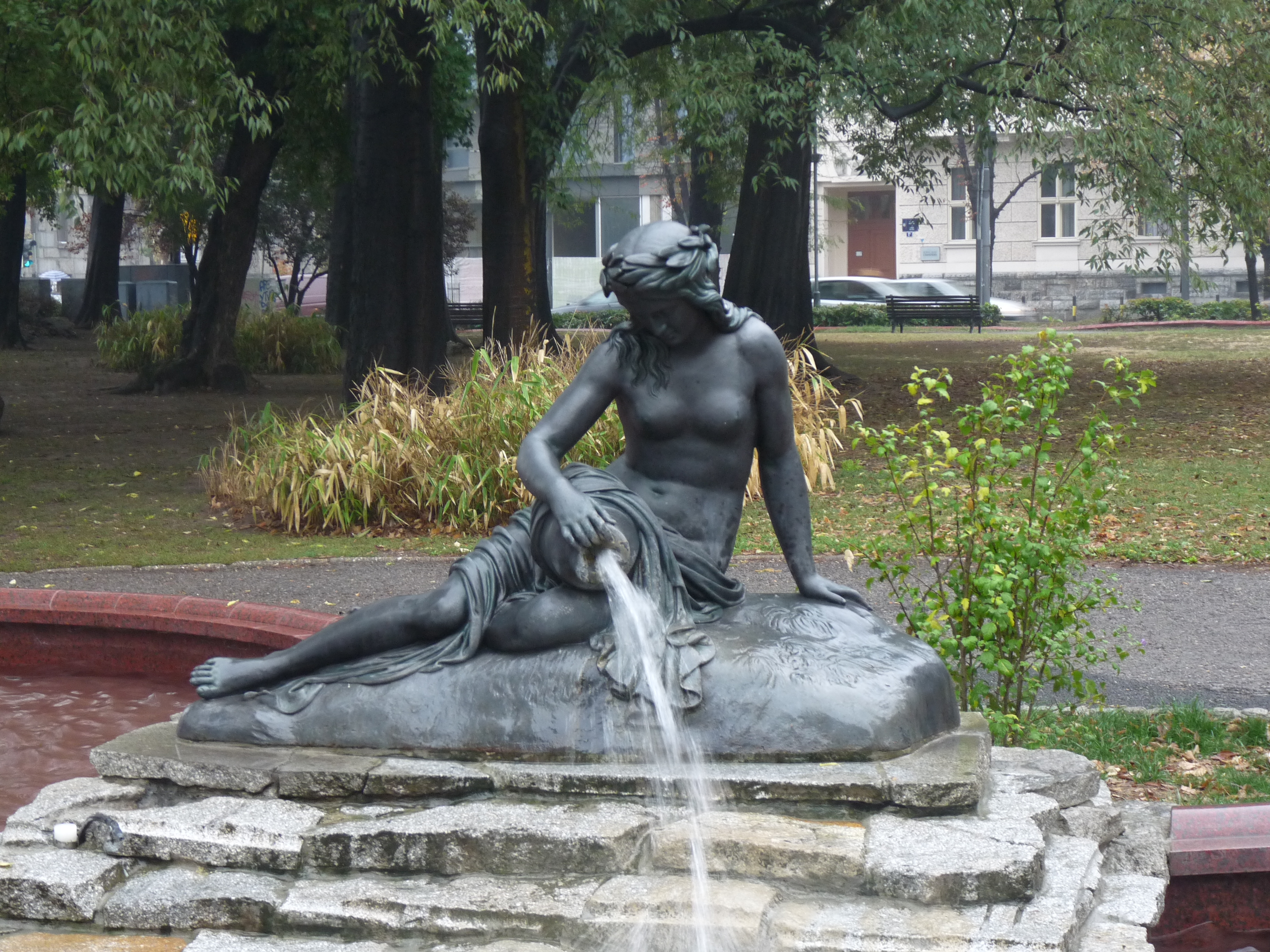
- Interactive map of Archaeological Site Pionirski Park

Site notes
- Website: Archaeological Site Pionirski Park

Archaeological Site Pionirski Park is one of the most important archaeological sites in Serbia. Protective and systematic researches of ancient Singidunum have been lasting for more than a hundred years. Unfortunately, at the beginning of the 21st century, knowledge of this city is still shallow compared to the knowledge of the history of other ancient cities that have been explored for so long. One of the reasons for this, is the fact that above the ancient Singidunum grew modern Belgrade whose construction destroyed the earlier cultural layers.

== Introduction ==
Ancient Singidunum which comprised castrum, civil dwellings and necropolis was declared archaeological site-cultural monument with the Decision of Cultural Heritage Preservation Institute of Belgrade No.176/8 dated 30 June 1964. This city was an important urban center in the province of Upper Moesia in the 1st century AD. Being situated on the road between two major Archaeological Site Pionirski Park 7 cities, Sirmium and Viminacium, Singidunum was developing as their important link. Specific strategic position represented a prerequisite for the emergence of urban structure of the city, which consisted of the legion camp, necropolis and craft activities.

Stone fortification of trapezoidal shape, measuring approximately 560m x 330m, on a hill above the confluence of the Sava and the Danube rivers was the headquarters of the legion IIII FLAVIAE. Defensive trench around the area of Knez Mihailova Street was a part of the land-palisade fort of the original camp, which is assumed to be 200m x 400m in size.

The settlement was spreading and narrowing over time, but in the period of its greatest development it spread in the area of today’s Kosančićev Venac, through Kralja Petra, Uzun-Mirkova streets, Studentski Square and the area around the Faculty of Philosophy, going to the north and northeast.

The ancient necropolises were also discovered in the territory of today’s Belgrade. There were three of them: one small, which occupied the area around today’s Pop-Lukina Street, Brankov Bridge and Zeleni Venac, 8 9 the other, that is designated as north-east, including the zone from Tadeuša Košćuškog street and Danube slope to the Republic Square. Southeast necropolis is spreading from the Republic Square through Decanska street, Boulevard of King Alexander to the Technical Faculty and to the Monument to Vuk Karadzić, where the largest number of graves were found.

== Protective archeological researches ==
In 2003, during the construction of the underground parking garage in Pionirski Park, protective archaeological researches were carried out and on this occasion 15 Roman tombs, 4 freely interred graves without the possibility of dating and 1 stone sarcophagus were discovered and excavated.

These findings confirmed that the site “Pionirski Park” was a part of the south - eastern necropolis of Ancient Singidunum, where the burial of the deceased was performed during the 3rd and 4th century AD. Several types of grave structures are represented:

- graves built of bricks laid horizontally
- graves of bricks laid sidelong
- burial pits without masonry structures, near which are observed the remains of iron nails, which indicates the use of wooden structures for the burial of the deceased.

All burial structures are built of Roman bricks, measuring 0.40 m x 0.27 m x 0.04 m, fixed with lime mortar, while the interior is plastered with hydrostatic mortar. Some of them were decorated with rabbit paw or cut resembling a Latin S, and many have the stamp LEG IIII FF indicating that the bricks were made in the local workshop of the Fourth Flavia legion that was stationed in Singidunum.

Most of the burial structures were looted, probably during the invasion of barbarian tribes. Only one grave (girl of about 14 years) was not robbed and was the basis for the subsequent presentation of archaeological findings. In this grave, beside the remains of the skeleton, were discovered grave finds, laid during the burial: glazed pitcher, two bronze rings, gold ring with a buckle closure.

Among other movable archaeological findings discovered on the site “Pionirski Park” should be mentioned: glass pearl discovered in the sarcophagus, a bronze coin with the image of Constantine II as Caesar (324-337) on the obverse and two soldiers with two standards – on the reverse, and one balsamarium of blue-green color.

== Presentation of the movable archeological material ==
In 2010, Cultural Heritage Preservation Institute of Belgrade has launched an initiative to mark the area where the archaeological findings and remains have been discovered by presenting a permanent exhibition of copies of the discovered findings in the underground parking garage. This idea was realized on March 17, 2011 when a showcase with copies of the movable archaeological material not only from the site “Pionrski Park”, but also from the other sites belonging to the southeastern necropolis of the Ancient Singidunum was staged in the hall of the garage, in front of the toll counter.

This exhibition is permanent and in May, 2011, was supplemented with the originals - movable archaeological material that was discovered on the site “Pionirski Park”. At the present time, in the showcase there are: copies of the pitcher, several bowls and oil lamplets, and the originals: antique brick, which belongs to the oldest cultural layer on this site and several pieces of “Turkish” pipes, which belong to the youngest cultural horizon in the “Pionirski Park”.

This is the first permanent exhibition of archaeological material on the site where it was discovered, whereby the task of archaeologist-conservator to present his findings to the public and to present a small segment of the rich history of Belgrade was carried out.

== Gallery ==
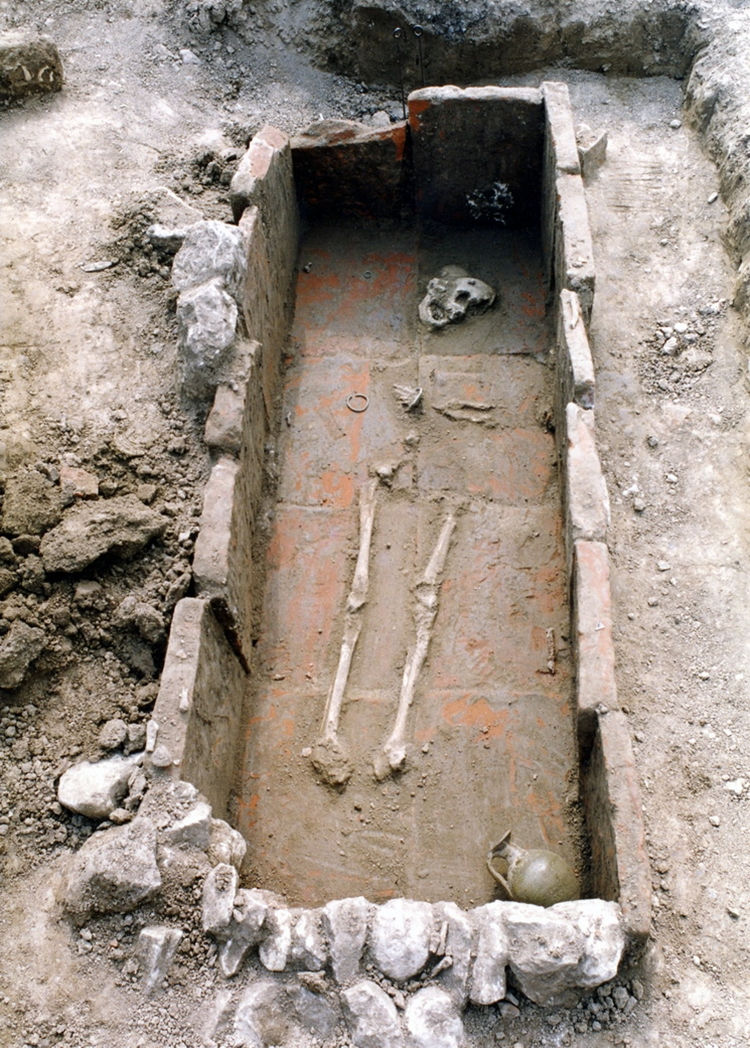
Roman grave

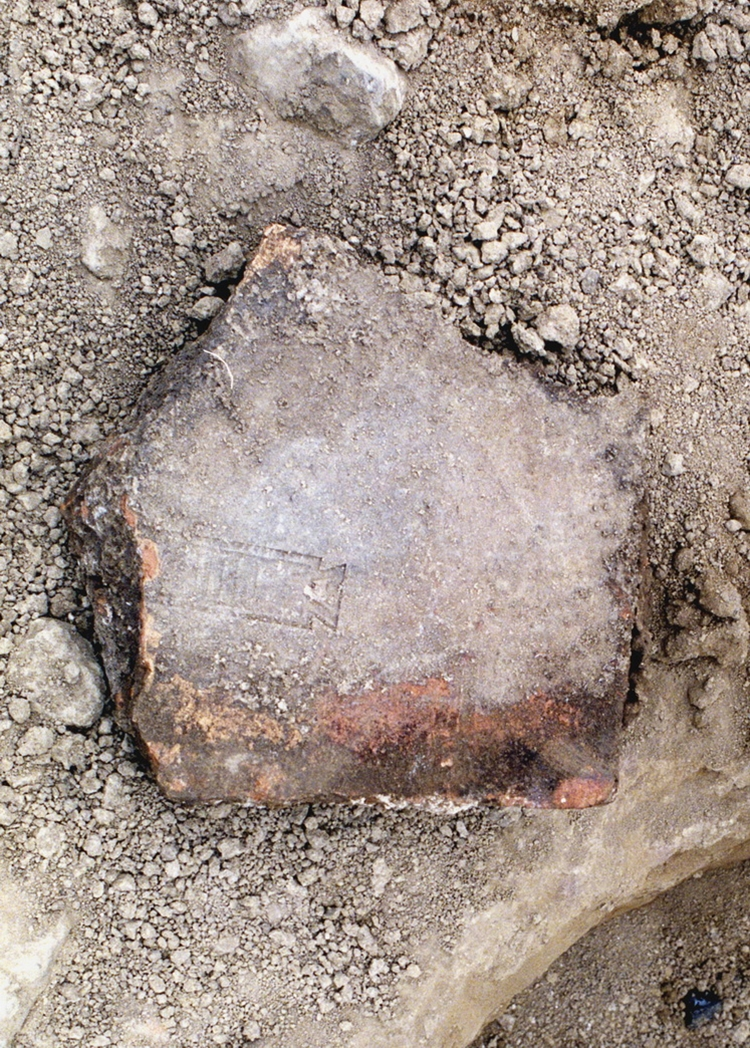
Roman bricks with the stamp of the Legion

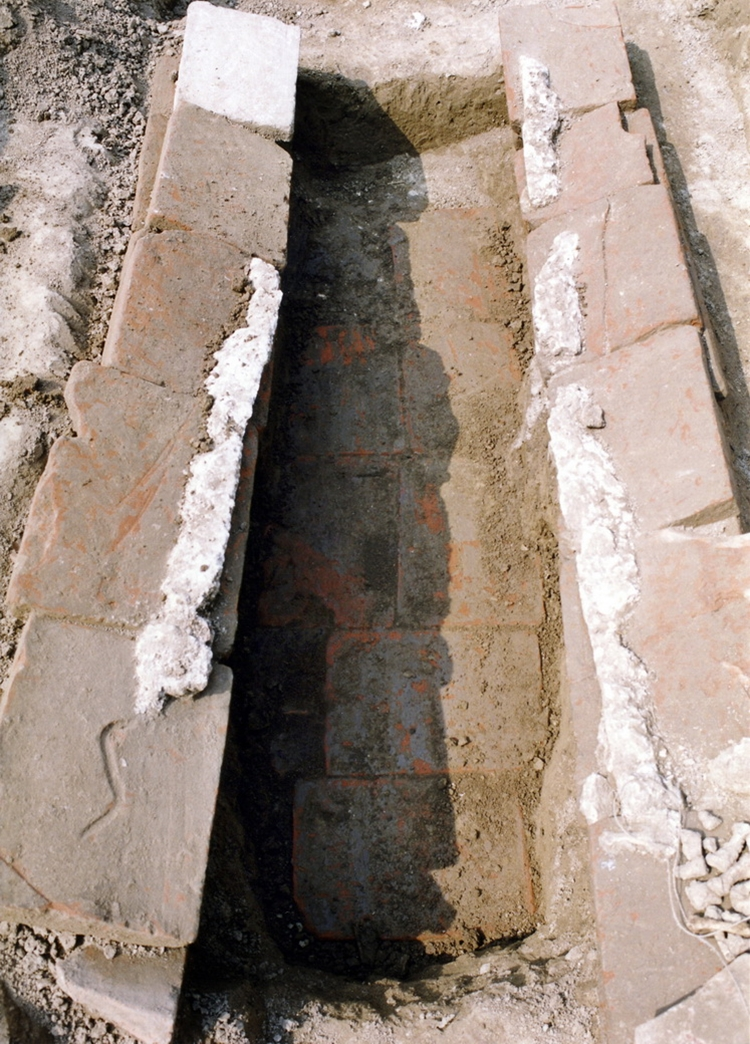
The interior of an ancient tomb

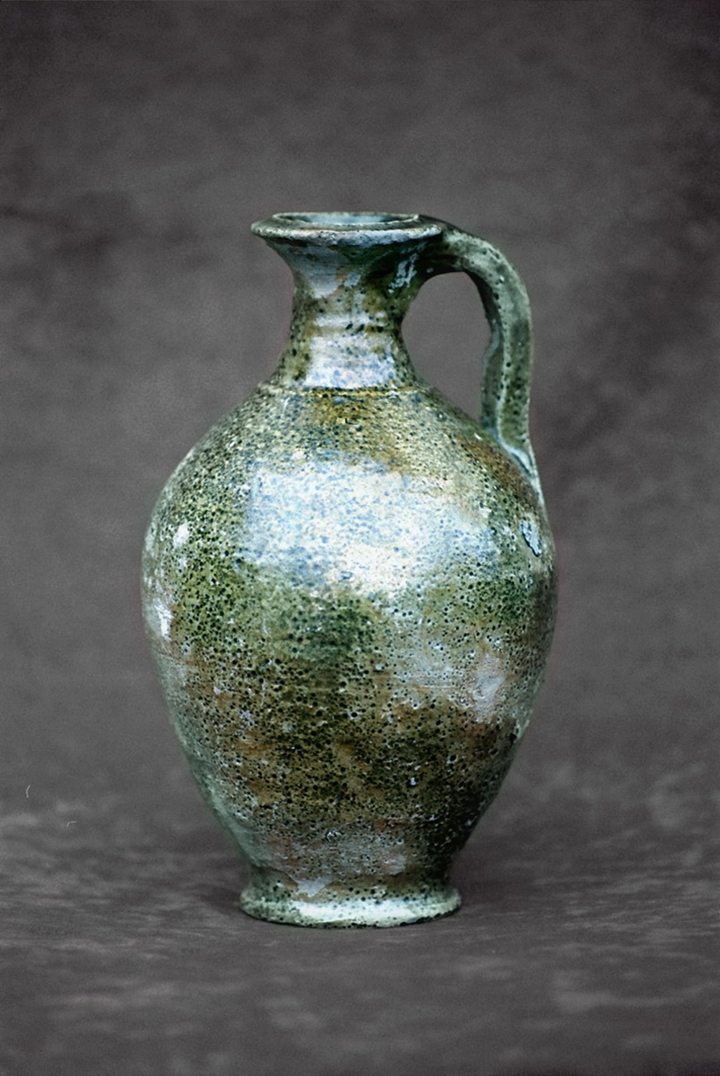
Jug

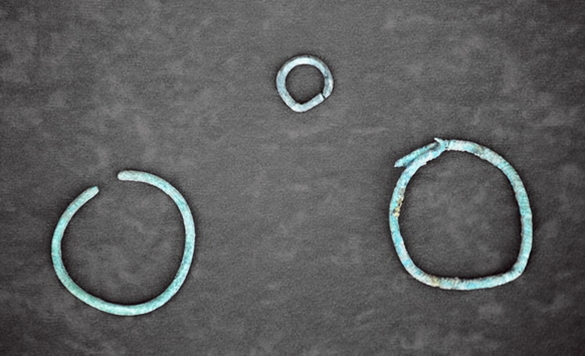
Bronze jewelry

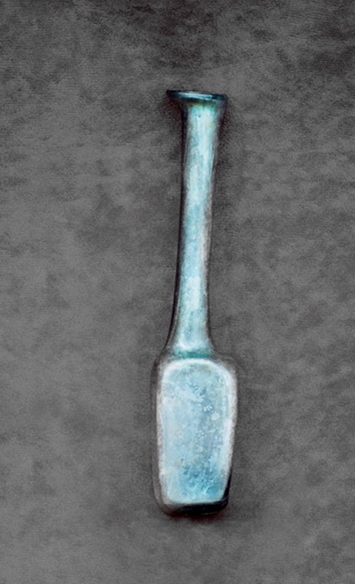
Balsamarium

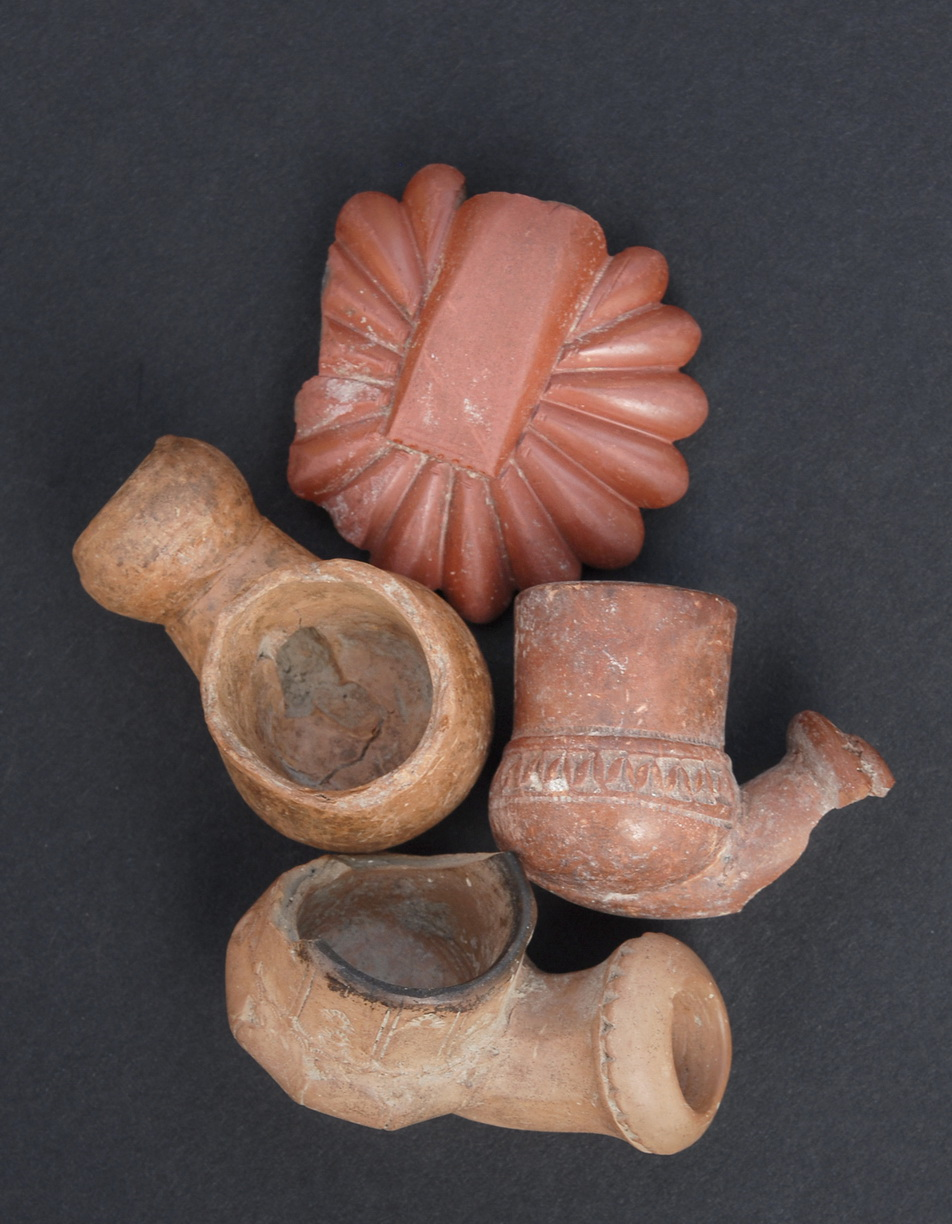
Pipes

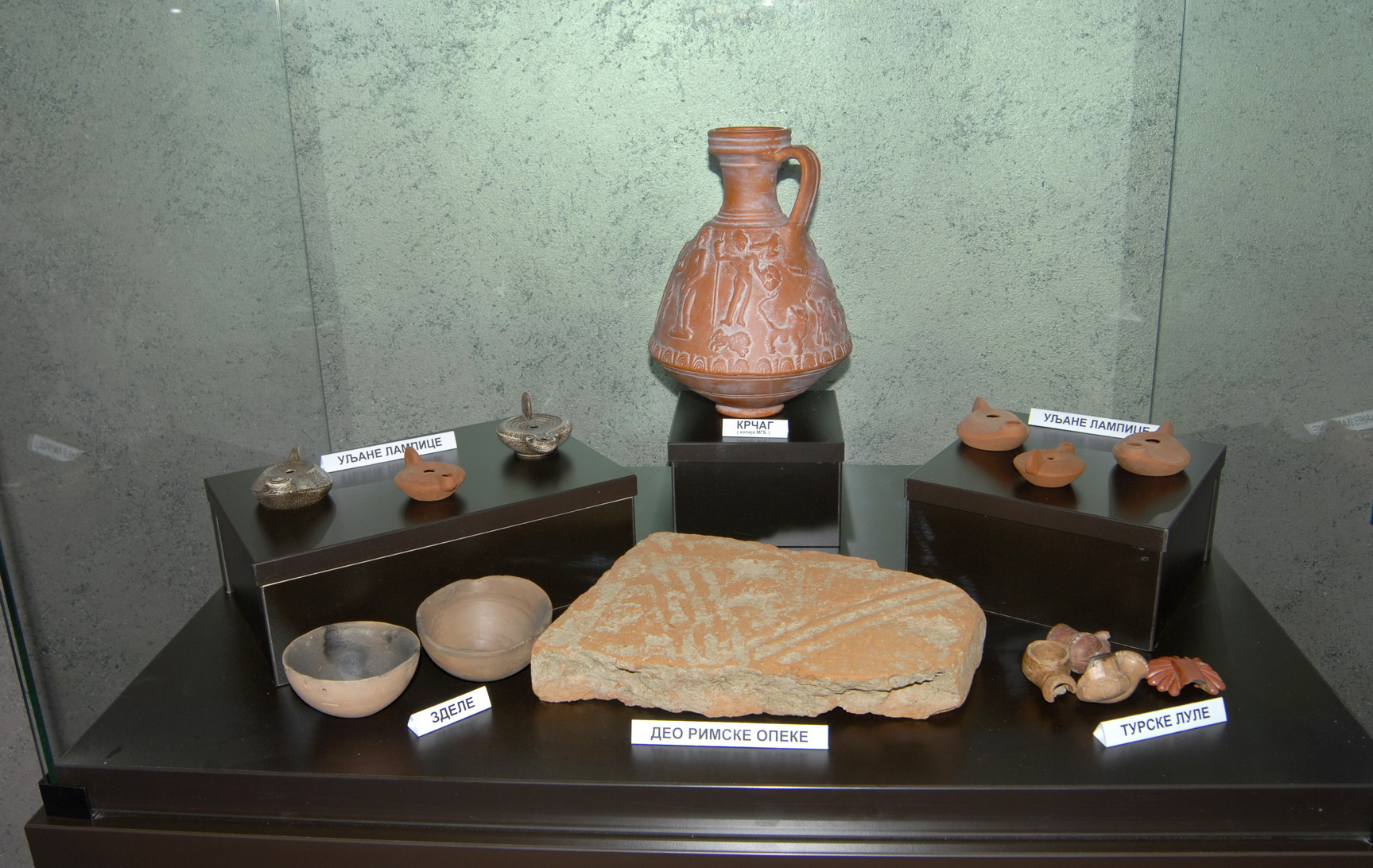
Regular exhibition of archaeological materials

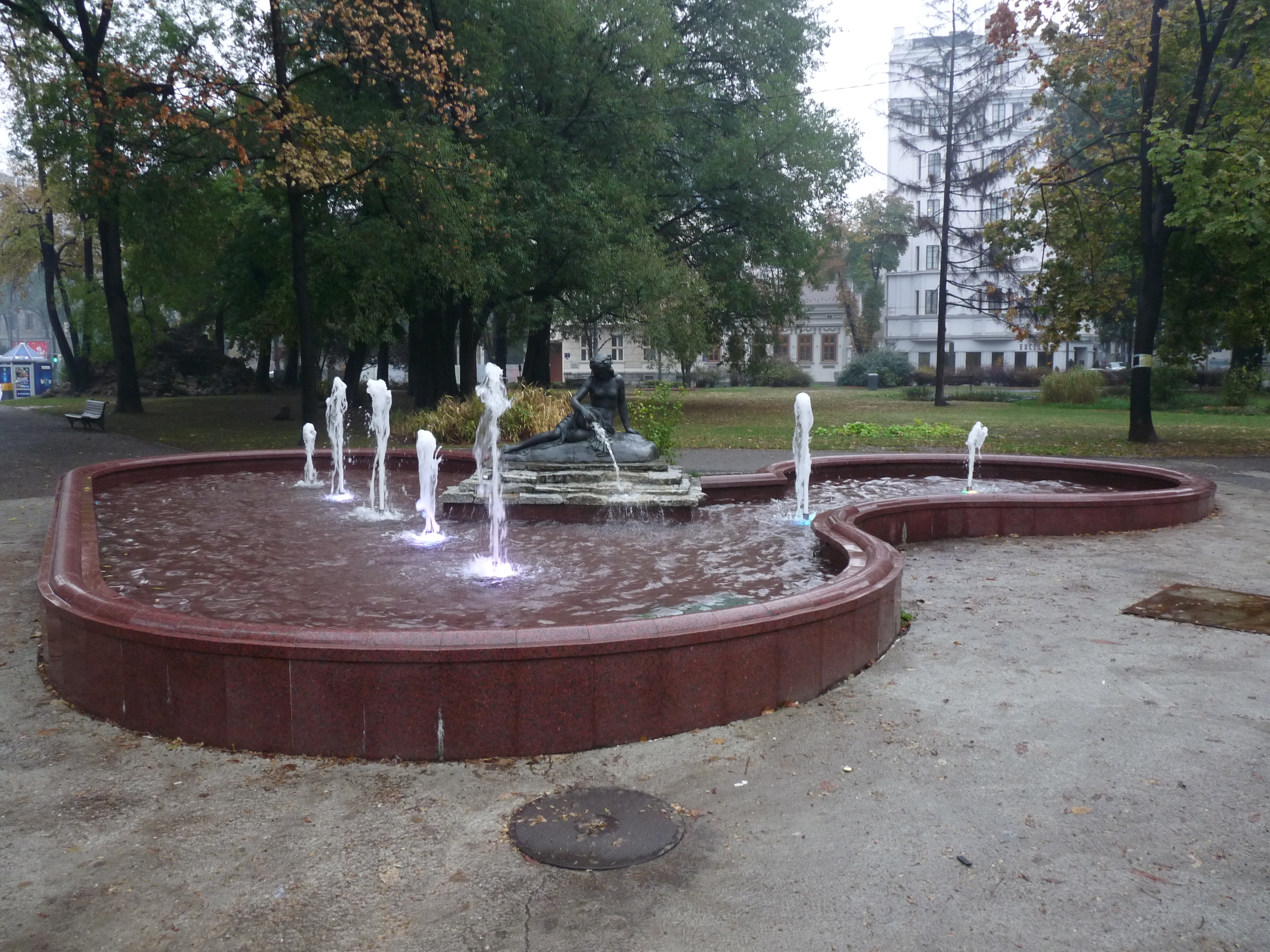
Girl with a goblet

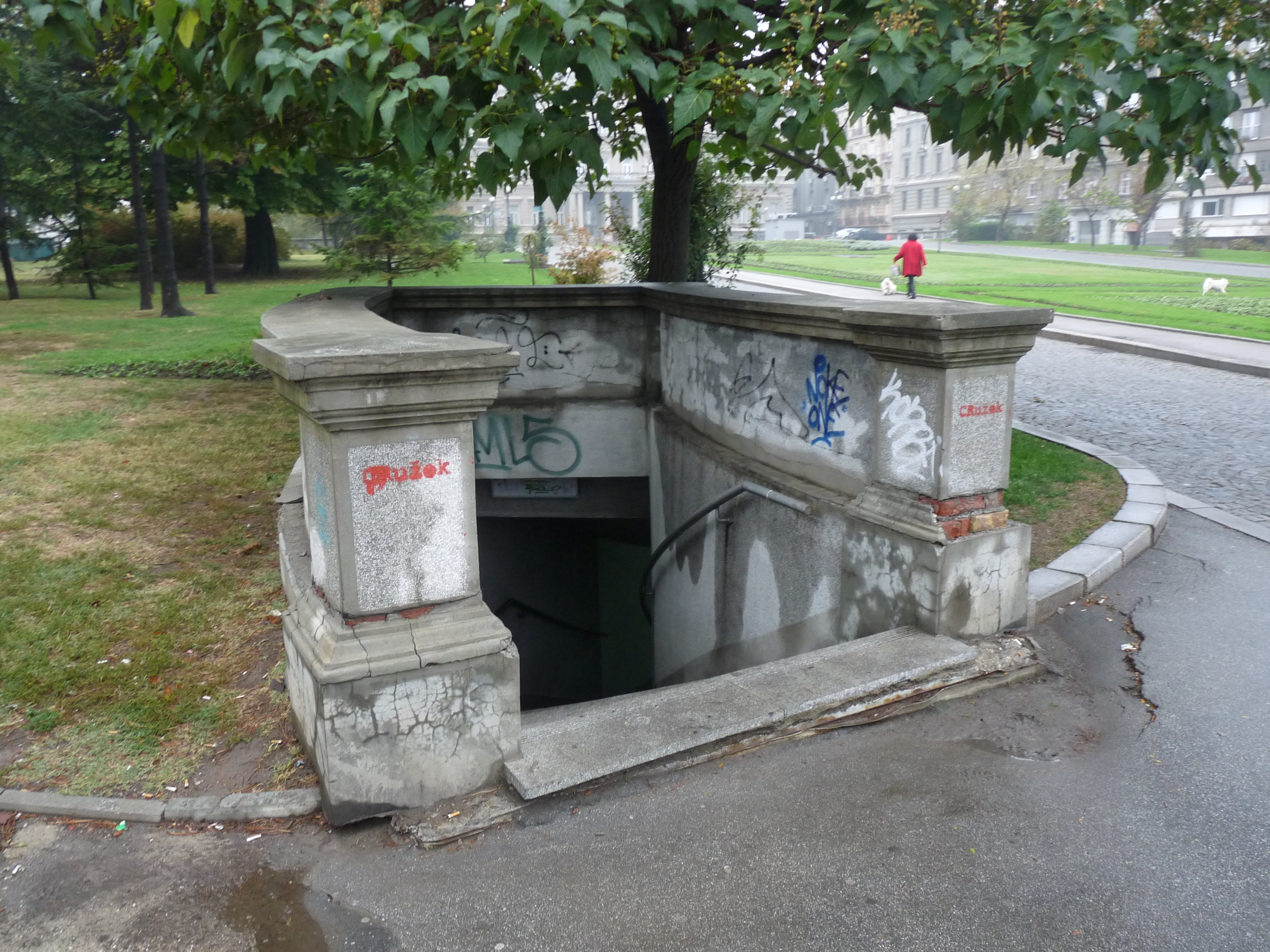
Underground passage of a Pionirski Park

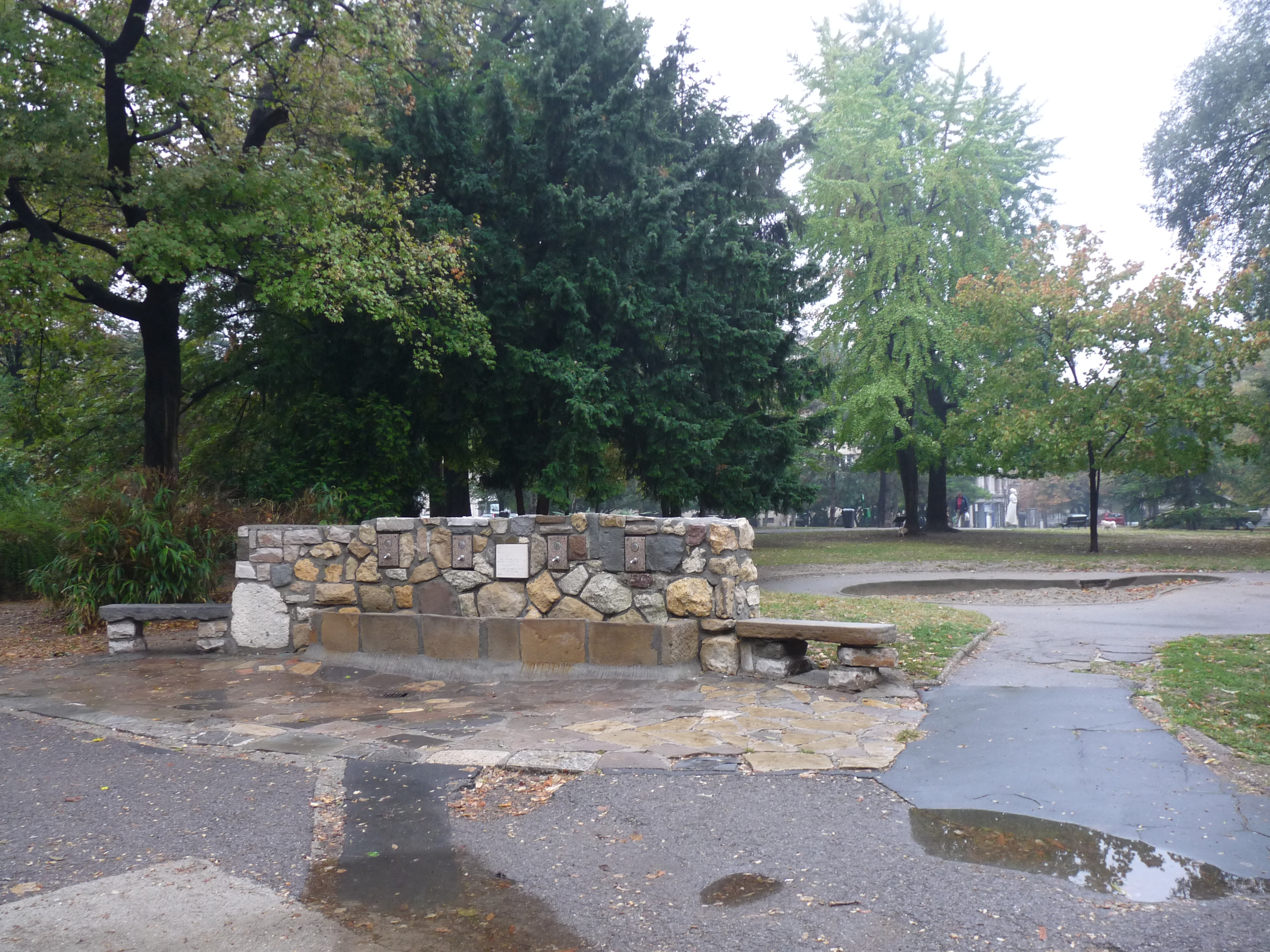
The fountain in Pionirski Park

== See more ==
- Singidunum

== Sources ==
- Archaeological Site Pionirski Park, Institute for Natural Heritage of Belgrade
- Zoran Simić, Rezultati zaštitnih arheoloških iskopavanja na prostoru jugoistočne nekropole Singidunuma, Singidunum 1, Beograd 1997, 21-56.
- M.Popović, Antički Singidunum: Dosadašnja otkrića i mogućnost daljih istraživanja, Singidvnvm 1, (1997), 1-20.
- Stefan Pop-Lazić, Nekropole rimskog Singidunuma, Singidvnvm 3, Beograd 2002, 7-101.
- Aleksandar Jovanović, Rimske nekropole na teritoriji Jugoslavije, Beograd 1984.
- Sonja Petru, Emonske nekropole, Ljubljana 1972.
