= Pre-war =

Pre-war or prewar (Latin: antebellum) is the period before the most recent or significant war in a culture's history, and may refer to:

- Prior to World War I
- Prior to World War II, last part of the interwar period
- Pre-war architecture, buildings from the 20th century before World War II
- Prewar period (Kosovo), 1991-1995

== See also ==
- Antebellum (disambiguation)
- Prewar Gibson banjo
- Prewar television stations
