= Antebellum =

Antebellum, Latin for "before war", may refer to:

== United States history ==
- Antebellum South, the pre-American Civil War period in the Southern US
  - Antebellum Georgia
  - Antebellum South Carolina
  - Antebellum Virginia
- Antebellum architecture

== Other uses ==
- Antebellum (film), a 2020 American film
- Lady Antebellum, former name of American country music group Lady A
- "Antebellum", a song by Vienna Teng, from the album Inland Territory, 2009
- "Antebellum", a song by The Human Abstract, from the album Digital Veil, 2011

== See also ==
- History of the Southern United States
- History of the United States (1789–1849)
- History of the United States (1849–1865)
- Status quo ante bellum, a Latin phrase meaning "the status before the war"
- Bellum (disambiguation)
