= Medaković, Belgrade =

Medaković Медаковић
- Urban neighbourhood
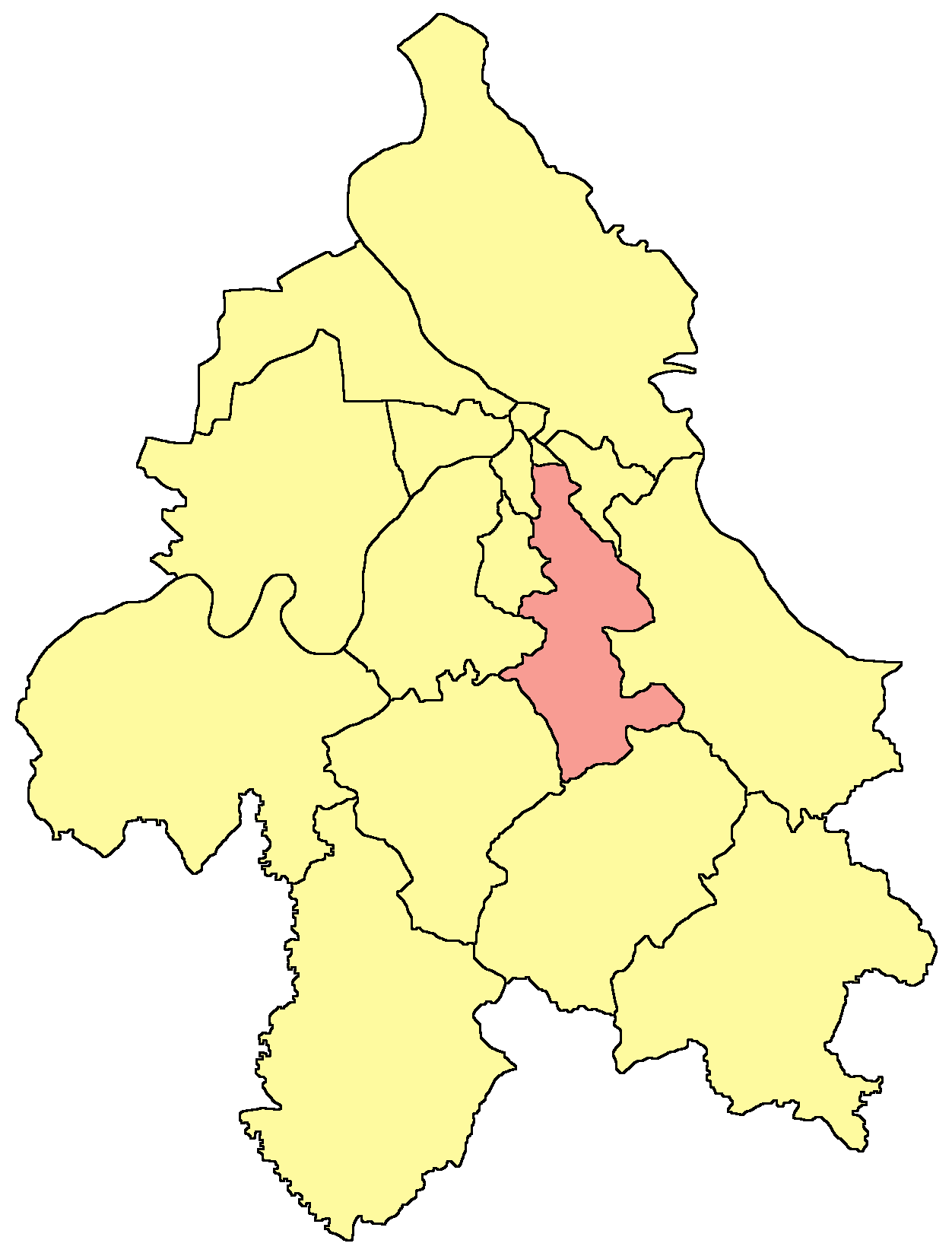

- Location within Belgrade
- Coordinates: 44°46′21″N 20°30′29″E
- Country: Serbia
- Region: Belgrade
- Municipality: Voždovac

Population (2011)
  - Total: 23,758
- Time zone: UTC+1 (CET)
  - Summer (DST): UTC+2 (CEST)
- Area code: +381(0)11
- Car plates: BG

Medaković (Serbian Cyrillic: Медаковић, pronounced [mɛ̂dakɔvit͡ɕ]), or colloquially Medak (Медак), is an urban neighborhood of Belgrade, the capital of Serbia. It is located in Belgrade's municipality of Voždovac, with the easternmost part of Medaković III being in the municipality of Zvezdara.

== Location ==
It is located in the valley of the Mokroluški potok, south of the Belgrade-Niš highway and consists of three parts, Medaković I on the west, Medaković II in the center and Medaković III on the east, the latter two being divided by the Vojislava Ilića street.

== Demographics ==
Historical population
Year	Pop.	±%
1981	13,179	—
1991	19,535	+48.2%
2002	23,691	+21.3%
2011	23,758	+0.3%

The combined population of the entire neighborhood was 23,758 by the 2011 census of population.

== Medaković I ==
Medaković I & II
Year	Pop.	±%
1981	13,179	—
1991	11,082	−15.9%
2002	11,038	−0.4%
2011	10,425	−5.6%

Medaković I or colloquially Medak I, is the western and oldest section of the neighborhood. It is bounded by the streets Medakovićeva on the north, where it borders the neighborhood of Marinkova Bara), Zaplanjska on the west where it borders Dušanovac and Ignjata Joba on the south where it borders the neighborhood of Braće Jerković. On the east and northeast it extends into Medaković II. The combined population of Medaković I and Medaković II was 10,425 in 2011.

Original settlement of houses and backyards with gardens, mostly illegally built, was demolished when the highway was built in the 1960s. The inhabitants were resettled in the newly built Medaković neighborhood, which consisted of one or two-story buildings, but the citizens planted gardens, orchards and built gazebos between the buildings. In 1967 the settlement consisted of 546 apartments and was colloquially labeled "the settlement of the houses in flowers".

In November 1968 city announced optimistic plans to resettle the neighboring Marinkova Bara, classified as an informal settlement at the time, and estimated to have a population of over 20,000. A total of 1,100 new building apartments were planned, which in turn developed into the Medaković neighborhood. Construction was planned to start in the spring of 1968, while the complete resettlement was to be finished by 1971. Since 1970s and especially 1980s, the neighborhood was transformed with the construction of the highrise.

== Medaković II ==
Medaković II or colloquially Medak II, is the central section. It borders the neighborhoods of Medaković I (west), Marinkova Bara (north), Braće Jerković (south) and Medaković III (east). It is entirely residential area, with central part constructed of 11 half-sphered buildings, centered on the roundabout of the bus line 30.

== Medaković III ==
Medaković III
Year	Pop.	±%
1991	8,453	—
2002	12,653	+49.7%
2011	13,333	+5.4%

Medaković III or colloquially Medak III, is the eastern and newer section of the neighborhood, mostly finished in the 1980s, but the full completion (arrangement of the green areas, streets, etc.) has not been done. It consists of similar, orange-white buildings with inclined, alpine-look rooftops. Medaković III is bordered by the neighborhoods of Medaković II (west), Padina (south) and Marinkova Bara (north, along the highway). It had a population of 13,333 in 2011.

There are three unnamed parks in the neighborhood, covering a total of 10.74 hectares (26.5 acres).
