= Grobari =

Supporters' group of JSD Partizan

- Abbreviation: Г70
- Founded: 1970
- Type: Supporters' group, Ultras
- Club: Partizan
- Motto: Za sve se navija, Partizan se voli! (Others are cheered for, Partizan is loved!)
- Location: Belgrade, Serbia
- Arenas: Partizan Stadium; Belgrade Arena
- Stand: South
- Colors: Black White
- Website: https://t.me/juznatribina

Grobari (Serbian Cyrillic: Гробари, lit. 'Undertakers' or 'Gravediggers') is a collective name for supporters of the Serbian multi-sport club Partizan. They are one of the two major supporters' groups in Serbia and are considered one of the best and loudest groups in the world, setting a record in 2010 by reaching 113.8 decibels and winning the EuroLeague's "BKT Heartbeat Challenge" award for the loudest fans in the 2024–25 season.

The group traditionally maintains Orthodox brotherhood with Greek PAOK Gate 4 and Russian CSKA Moscow ultras, and friendly relations with Bulgarian CSKA Sofia Animals, Romanian CSA Steaua București Outlaws and Polish Widzew Łódź ultras. These are based on either shared religion, Slavic heritage, army club heritage or club colors.

== Name ==
During one of the Eternal Derbies, the south stand of Partizan Stadium was filled with army officers and agents in black coats, all supporting Partizan. Across the field, on the north stand, a rowdy, ragtag crowd cheered for Red Star. They were loud and chaotic, with some even stripping naked. As the first half neared its end, the officers in the south stand stood up and began shouting at them: "Gypsies! Gypsies! Gypsies!" In an instant, the ragged crowd on the opposite side spontaneously shouted back: "Gravediggers! Gravediggers! Gravediggers!" They were mocking the black coats worn by the officers, which resembled those of gravediggers. Over time, Partizan fans proudly adopted the name "Gravediggers," wearing it as a badge of honor.

== History ==
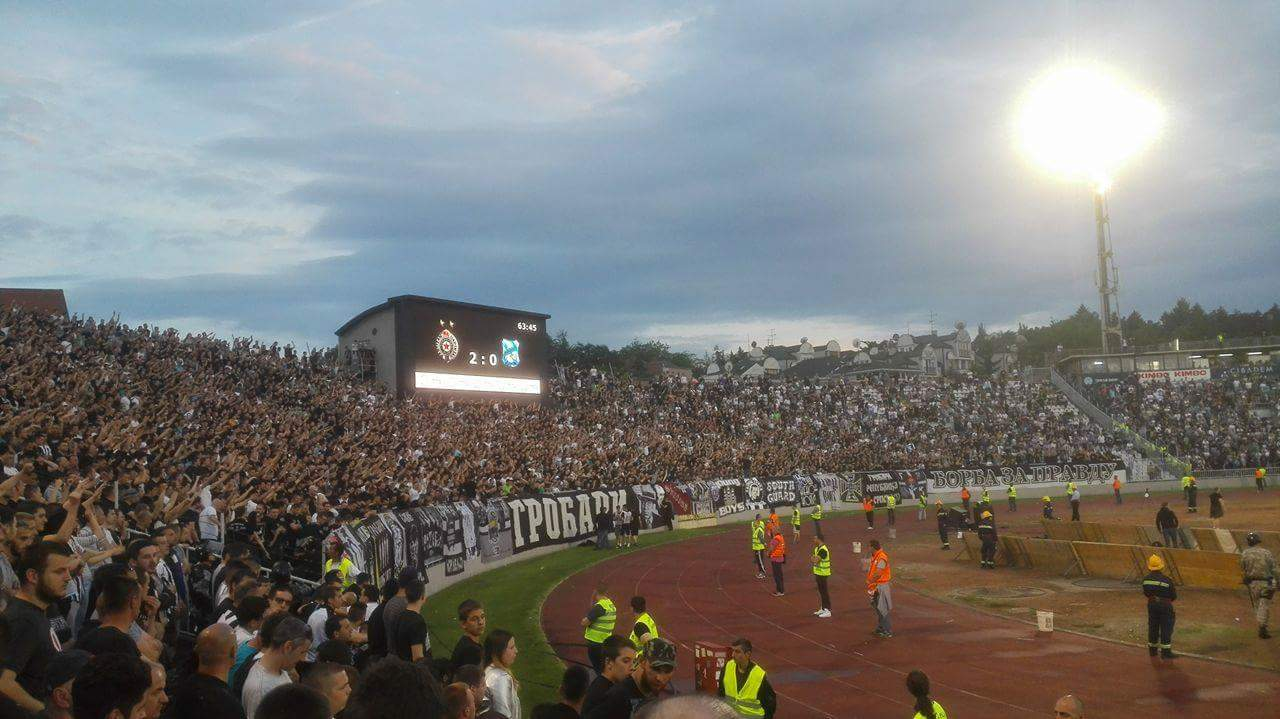
Grobari celebrating Partizan's 27th league title won in 2017

=== 1940s ===
With the establishment of JSD Partizan in 1945, its first fan groups began to form. However, it was not until the early 1950s that organized supporter groups started to take shape, gathering in the stadium's south stand.

=== 1950-1970s ===
By the late 1950s and early 1960s, the first flags appeared, while the 1970s brought the introduction of chants, large banners, and the official adoption of the name Grobari. These years marked the true 'birth' of Grobari as an organized group. The excitement surrounding Partizan's early European competitions, including the first-ever European Cup match played between Partizan and Sporting CP, attracted many new fans, adding to the growing energy in the stands. The 1966 European Cup final, played between Partizan and Real Madrid, further boosted the club's popularity, introducing even more supporters. Their loyalty and dedication remained strong even during the club's downturn in results, with growing crowds continuing to gather at every match.

=== 1980s ===
The 1980s marked a period of dominance and expansion for the Grobari, in terms of their numbers, organization, and influence. This avant-garde generation, known as "Punitive Expedition", became synonymous with the emergence of young and aggressive supporters and set the foundation for what would become the enduring identity of the Grobari for generations to come. They followed Partizan to every away game. Their slogan was "With Partizan to the Grave". This generation is known as the most loyal and extreme fanbase of the club.

=== 1990s ===
The 1990s marked the breakup of Yugoslavia and the outbreak of the Yugoslav Wars, events in which many fans from the affected republics, along with volunteers from Serbia, became involved. In 1992, the Grobari, with the support of the club's management, established the fan association "Agencija Grobari." However, on October 3, 1999, the fan association "Južni Front" was founded in response to alleged mismanagement within "Agencija Grobari." With tacit approval from the club's negligent leadership, those in charge of "Agencija Grobari" exploited the Grobari name, tarnishing its reputation. Key issues included ticket scalping, unchecked profiteering from fan merchandise, and scandals during European away games. For a time, "Južni Front" operated in the south stand before relocating to the east stand (and to the north stand for larger matches). "Agencija Grobari" was officially dissolved after October 30, 1999. In 2000, another fan association, "Grobari 1970," was formed.

=== 2000s ===
In the 2003/04 season, a group of Grobari entered a fight with Bad Blue Boys during a friendly tournament in Switzerland. The season was full of uncertainty in the club as expectations were high for Partizan, the task to win back-to-back titles this season after they were crowned champions in the 2002/03 season and very little fans hoping in qualification for European competitions as Partizan had to face Djurgårdens IF Fotboll, drawing in the first match at home which made the fans believe Partizan would not qualify for the UEFA Champions League, while in the second leg Partizan drew 2-2 but went through due to the away goal rule, winning 3-3 on aggregate. The victory had the Grobari in happiness, over 500 Grobari in the Serb diaspora had visited Stockholm in the second leg, celebrating their victory. In the final round of European qualifications, Partizan faced Newcastle where the match was famously known for their victory on penalties thanks to Ivica Kralj's performances where Partizan would finally qualify for the Champions League. In the aftermath of the match, the Grobari had been celebrating all day due to the victory in Serbia on the streets.

After the club's management decided to revoke all privileges granted to other fan associations, fulfilling part of the demands of the "Južni Front," they returned to the south stand for the first time in several years during the 124th derby on April 23, 2005.

Revolted by Partizan being eliminated from the Champions League qualifications, followed by elimination from the first round of the UEFA cup and from the national cup competition by a third division team, as well as poor results in the domestic league (all at the start of the 2005–06 season), Grobari declared a complete boycott of all Partizan football club matches. Several thousand supporters gathered in September 2005 in front of the club stadium and publicly accused sports director Nenad Bjeković and general secretary Žarko Zečević of tampering with the club's operating budget and transfer policy in order to line their own pockets. On this occasion, they also reminded the public of some previous club officials' machinations.

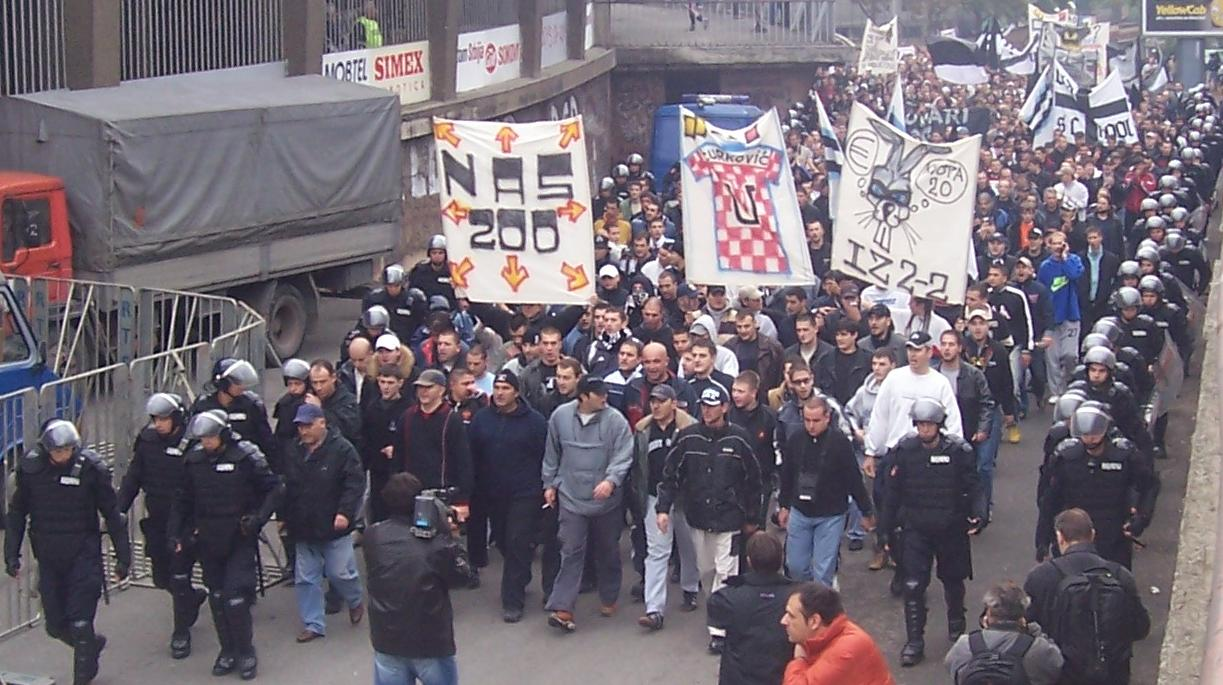
Grobari during a protest in front of the Partizan stadium in October 2005.

They demanded club management resignations as a condition for getting back to the stadium stands. Grobari repeated the massive gathering and reiterated their demands in October 2005 in front of the national theatre in downtown Belgrade where Partizan's officials were celebrating the club's 60th anniversary. Both city football derbies between Red Star and Partizan in the 2005–06 season were played without traditional support toward Partizan from the south stands. Although these matches used to gather up tens of thousands and even more fans to the stadiums, the infamous record was established this season when there was only a few thousand spectators on the Partizan stadium, since the rival fans also agreed to boycott the derby (but for other reasons).

After certain changes in the club board, Grobari decided to stop boycotting. On 26 May 2007, they returned to the stadium for a Superliga match against Mladost Apatin which Partizan won 7–1, however they kept on singing insulting songs about Partizan's sports director and general secretary.

By the end of the year both Bjeković and Zečević resigned from their positions.

=== Ban from Europe ===
In the 2007–08 UEFA cup, Partizan Belgrade was disqualified from further competition because of football hooliganism against Zrinjski Mostar. Grobari traveled in numbers to Mostar where they fought with the police and also Zrinjski fans. Partizan won the tie 11–1 on aggregate.

=== 2011 split ===
In late August 2011, another split among Grobari occurred. A faction of fans calling themselves Zabranjeni (The Forbidden) accused the club board of denying them entrance to the stadium. They are also in disagreement with some other Grobari subgroups, primarily Alcatraz. They attend the games of other teams from Partizan multi-sports club, such as ice hockey or women's basketball teams. In November, a small group were at the match against Borac Čačak. In 2012, they started attending Partizan football games on the east stand.

=== Contemporary period (2021-present) ===
In 2021, after the arrest of prominent south stand leader, Veljko Belivuk and his crew, tribune was relatively damaged after years of separation, split and internal infighting for domination. During that period FK Partizan was in heavy period due to various criminal complaints and alleged manipulation by then director of the club, Miloš Vazura, Grobari from the south stand called for a boycott of Partizan's football games. During that time, KK Partizan's new team and incoming legendary coach, Željko Obradović, saw enormous success and Grobari mainly attended basketball and handball matches of the club. In 2024 a protest took place in Belgrade against the administration of Partizan's football club, which turned out to be a success. Most of the groups returned to the south stand in the beginning of 2024–25 Serbian SuperLiga season, marking the end of the boycott, and possibly new wave of younger, fresher fans at the south stand. This marked the time when Grobari displayed only general marks and banners of the supporters and not having individual groups display their banners too, symbolizing the end of the divide that was happening in the last decade and more. During 2025–26 EuroLeague season, KK Partizan experienced harsh 4-7 beginning of the season, making coach Željko Obradović officially leave the club. Grobari decided to surprise and wait him at Nikola Tesla Airport while he was returning from Athens. It sparked massive pushback and chants against Ostoja Mijailović, president of the club, for allegedly manipulating decisions made by Obradović to make him step down from coach of the club, without him officially firing him, due to Obradović supporting ongoing protests in Serbia.

== Structure ==
Grobari's organizational structure is relatively decentralized, consisting of multiple subgroups based at the south stand. The number, influence, and visibility of these subgroups have varied over time.

Current groups are:

- 40+, Južni Front (loose connection of multiple groups from Pančevo, Šabac, Loznica, with smaller groupings in other cities), South Guard (from Ruma), Još Neko Kopa (from Vračar, with smaller groupings in other cities), Principi (from Galenika and Zvezdara, with smaller groupings in other cities), Anti Romi (from Karaburma, with smaller groupings in other cities), Brain Damage Firm (from Leskovac, with smaller groupings in other cities), Alternativa (from various parts of Belgrade), Vandal Boys (from Block 61, 62, 63), Shadows (from Braće Jerković and Medaković, with smaller groupings in other cities), Commando (from Braće Jerković, Medaković and Zemun), Partizan Offender (from Konjarnik and Mali Mokri Lug), Ludnica Kovin (from Kovin), Alo Požega (from Požega), Obrenovac Headhunters (from Obrenovac), Temerin Defender (from Temerin).

With Grobari from other cities, without specific names:

- Grobari Padinjak (from Padinska Skela), Grobari Trstenik (from Trstenik), Grobari Kraljevo (from Kraljevo), GVB (from Vrnjačka Banja), Grobari Kruševac (from Kruševac), G-018 (from Niš), Grobari Leskovac (from Leskovac), GNS (from Novi Sad), Grobari Vršac (from Vršac), Grobari Republika Srpska (grouping of subgroups from different cities in Republika Srpska), Grobari Vukovar (from Vukovar), Grobari Nikšić (from Nikšić), Grobari Nova Pazova (from Nova Pazova), Grobari Bar (from Bar), Dijaspora (grouping of diaspora subgroups, including Zurich, Paris, Vienna, Ljubljana, Vicenza, Stuttgart, Nuremberg, Amsterdam, Stockholm, Ontario, Salzburg)

With other attendees on the south stand being either from an unorganized group or regular supporters.

== Notable leaders ==
- Nebojša Andrić "Belgija"
- Zoran Živanović "Čegi"
- Veljko Belivuk "Nevolja"
- Ljubomir Marković "Kića"
- Miloš Radisavljević "Kimi"
- Alen Kostić "Kubi"

== Politics ==
=== Anti-government sentiment ===
Since 2016, Grobari have consistently expressed their vocal opposition to the government of President Aleksandar Vučić, frequently chanting the derogatory slogan "Vučiću pederu!" ("Vučić, faggot!") at various matches.

This opposition stands in contrast to Delije, whose silence is interpreted as tacit support for both the government and President Vučić, a self-identified Delija. The Grobari have repeatedly called them out, chanting slogans such as "Delije, ajmo svi u glas, Aleksandar Vučić jedan je od nas!" ("Delije, let's all shout together, Aleksandar Vučić is one of us!").

Since the collapse of the Novi Sad railway station canopy and the start of subsequent anti-corruption protests, the Grobari's dissatisfaction has only grown louder. They have displayed banners such as "Students IN, Vučić OUT" in the south stand and chanted slogans like "Vučiću pederu!", "Pumpaj!", and "Ko ne skače, taj je ćaci!" at numerous matches, all of which are popular slogans from the protests.

For the major protest scheduled for March 15, the Grobari sent a strong message with a banner reading "Partizan i studenti iznad svih" ("Partizan and students above all") and an announcement that they would be taking to the streets to protect their fellow citizens, saying, "If they attack you, let us handle it!"

During the eternal derby in April 2025, a scandal broke out when the country's largest sports channel, Arena Sport, muted the live broadcast to prevent the airing of anti-government chants by Grobari.

=== Neo-Nazism ===
Partizan faced numerous fines and sanctions due to Grobari's racist, nationalistic, and violent behavior, accumulating over €2 million in penalties between 2010 and 2023.

Fans have been observed directing monkey chants towards black players numerous times.

In a 2014 match against Tottenham Hotspur, fans unfurled an antisemitic banner inspired by the Only Fools and Horses logo, which read: "Only Jews and Pussies".

Another incident occurred in 2019, when fans showed a Neo-Nazi Celtic cross banner in a match against Yeni Malatyaspor. This was not the first instance of such imagery being used, as the symbol had appeared on the south stand as early as 2009 or earlier.

In 2020, the official group YouTube channel uploaded a video featuring fans wearing t-shirts emblazoned with the slogan "Love Partizan, hate Antifa" on the front, where the letter "O" was replaced by a shield featuring the Nazi Týr rune. On the back, the shirts displayed a Celtic cross and the Serbian eagle used by the Government of National Salvation. In the background, the Celtic cross banner appears once again alongside banners reading: "Europe knows, but refuses to admit it – Ratko defended us from terrorism." and "Stop Islamization of Serbia, stop migrants!" while the fans chanted "Ratko Mladić".
