= Pašino Brdo =

Pašino Brdo Пашино Брдо
- Urban neighbourhood
- Location within Belgrade
- Coordinates: 44°47′17″N 20°29′14″E
- Country: Serbia
- Region: Belgrade
- Municipality: Vračar

Area
  - Total: 0.31 km^{2} (0.12 sq mi)
- Time zone: UTC+1 (CET)
  - Summer (DST): UTC+2 (CEST)
- Postal code: 11050
- Area code: +381(0)11
- Car plates: BG

Pašino Brdo (Serbian Cyrillic: Пашино Брдо) is an urban neighborhood of Belgrade, the capital of Serbia. It is located in Belgrade's municipality of Voždovac, while the northern section belongs to the municipality of Vračar. It is also known as Lekino Brdo (Serbian Cyrillic: Лекино Брдо) after the top Communist official, Aleksandar Ranković (1909–83), whose nickname was Leka ("Leka's hill").

== Location ==
Pašino Brdo, as the name says it (Serbian for "Pasha's hill"), is located on the hill of the same name, in the extreme north of the municipality of Voždovac and extreme south of the municipality of Vračar. Geographically, the hill and its slopes cover much larger area than what is today considered the neighborhood of Pašino Brdo, which is generally bordered by the neighborhoods of Dušanovac on the south, Šumice on the east and extends into Crveni Krst on the north-east and Čubura on the north-west.

== Geography ==
On the southern side, the hill originates from the Belgrade-Niš highway, that is, the former valley of the Mokroluški potok and it elevates to the terminus of the trolleybus line 22 which is, with the small park and a church, located on the top of the hill. Then it descends to the north until the South Boulevard, or the former valley of the Čuburski potok. Thus, geographically, parts of the neighborhoods of Dušanovac and Šumice are located on the hill as well.

== History ==
The complex built in 1912 along the Daviel Street in Paris consisted of 40 one-floor houses with gardens, indented from the main street. This style became very popular across the Europe. A whole string of new neighborhoods tailored after this encircled eastern outskirts of Belgrade after World War I, with names usually containing "suburb" and some member of the royal family. These original names either never became popular or were suppressed after World War II and replaced. Construction on Pašino Brdo, formerly a hill in the outskirts of Belgrade, began after 1920, as the Suburb of Vojvoda Stepa. It was a planned neighborhood from the start, with a regular street grid.

Despite being a residential settlement on the outskirts of Belgrade, and not having industrial or military facilities, Pašino Brdo and the neighboring Dušanovac was partially demolished during the heavy „Easter bombing“ of Belgrade by the Allies on 16 April 1944.

== Name ==
The hill was named after the local governor Suleyman Pasha. During the First Serbian Uprising, leader of the rebels Karađorđe made a deal with Suleyman Pasha, guaranteeing the safe retreat to the Ottomans and their families to Bulgaria. The rebels broke the deal attacking the retreating Ottomans, and Suleyman himself was killed in the modern neighborhood of Zeleno Brdo, further to the east from Pašino Brdo. A Pasha's Drinking Fountain was built on the location.

After World War II, the name was officially changed to Lekino Brdo, after Aleksandar Ranković. Though the original name was officially returned in the 1990s, the name Lekino Brdo remained in wide use. Additionally, the local community which occupies the top of the hill, was officially named "David Pajić" for the 1981 and 1991 censuses.

== Characteristics ==
It has a small park on top of it (Češki park) with a new Church of the Transfiguration of Jesus. As a curiosity for a small neighborhood, there is another church in Pašino Brdo, the older Church of the Holy Trinity. A section of the park was turned into a modern children playground in April 2008. It is first of the planned total of 7 playgrounds on the territory of the municipality of Voždovac, constructed under new standards: harmless and ecological colors and varnishes, protective measures, top quality woods, rubber placed as floor, etc. Name of the playground is "Vrbica", celebrating Lazarus Saturday, called Vrbica in Serbian and generally considered a children's holiday.

== Features ==
=== Church of the Holy Trinity ===
After World War I, a motion was started for the construction of a church somewhere on the hill, in the suburb of Vojvoda Stepa, as the neighborhood was called at the time. The idea was pushed by the retired teacher Živojin Radosavljević, who was also a member of the board for the construction of the new Church of Saint Sava on Vračar hill. The idea was to relocate the iconostasis from the old Church of Saint Sava to this new church. The Society for development of Vojvoda Stepa suburb opted for renting some of the already existing houses instead of building a new one. In 1922 they rented the summer house of vojvoda Petar Bojović at 89 Gospodara Vučića Street, and adapted it into the chapel, with added bell tower.

During the Interbellum, it was the only church between the Church of Saint Sava in Vračar and the town of Grocka on the east. The church was paying rent to Bojović until 1945 and to his descendants until 1948. In the massive process of nationalization by the new Communist government after 1945, the house was taken away from the Bojović family and auctioned for sale. The Serbian Orthodox Church purchased the object, becoming its full proprietor.

Preparations for the construction of the new building on the location of the old one began in the mid 2000s. The old parochial home was demolished in 2015 and the new one was finished in 2017. In August 2018 the church itself was demolished and the construction of a new one began. In the meantime, the church service will temporarily be held in the new parochial home. The construction works should be finished by the Easter of 2019, followed by the furnishing and painting of the church. The new building was designed by architect Aleksandar Lukić, in the Serbo-Byzantine Revival style.

=== Bibija Chapel ===
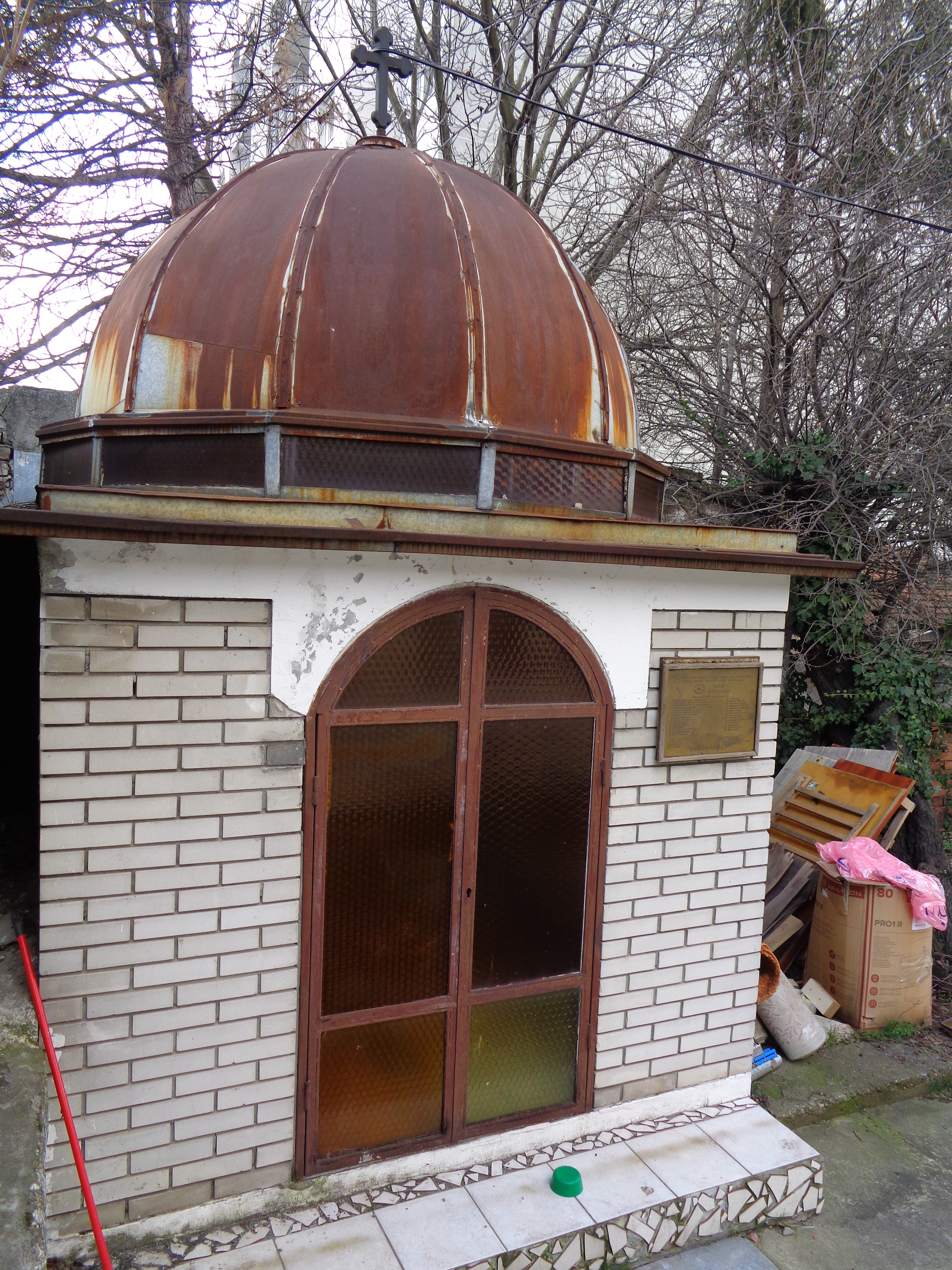
Bibija's chapel in Pašino Brdo

A monument dedicated to the Romanies who died in World War I fighting in Serbian army was originally placed in the neighborhood of Čubura, close to the modern park. It was mentioned in the 1924 work Spomenici na okrajini Beograda ("Monuments on the edges of Belgrade") by Milan Vukićević. The stone monument was located right above the Čuburski stream and had inscription "Serbian Gypsy Youth to its heroes killed 1912-1918". In 1924 it was moved to the yard in the Gospodara Vučića Street, on the northern slope of Pašino Brdo. The lot was owned by the Romani organization "Društvo Rom". Accompanying memorial plaque was added in 1930. Since 1934, the owner was "Association of Belgrade Gypsies, Celebrators of Auntie Bibija". The monument has been updated with the memorial plaque containing some names of those killed in World War II, too.

In time, a small chapel dedicated to Bibija, a Romani deity of salvation, was built. The land was nationalized after the war, but in the 1970s the state allowed religious, social and ceremonial use of the complex by the Romani people. This resulted in the development of the Romani movement in Yugoslavia, and then in the world during the 1970s. The objects deteriorated in time and the lot was sold to the private owner. Romani organizations pleaded the municipal and city authorities to preserve the complex but were ignored. In 2019, demolition of the objects on the lot was announced which caused protests of the Romani intellectuals and occasional gatherings at the location. The monument was almost demolished in September 2019, when the police intervened and stopped it. In December 2019, deity Bibija was declared the intangible cultural heritage of Serbia, but the complex itself wasn't protected as the cultural heritage. In November 2020, city administration intervened, saying the complex will be preserved, and placed it under the preliminary protection. The complex was declared a spatial cultural-historical unit in May 2023.

== Municipality ==
When Belgrade was divided into raions in 1945, Pašino Brdo became part of the Raion VI. From June 1945 to December 1946, Pašino Brdo was one of 5 administrative neighborhoods within the Raion VI. When districts were abolished in 1952 and municipalities created, Pašino Brdo got its own municipality, which however was abolished on September 1, 1955 when Pašino Brdo was annexed to the municipality of Voždovac. At the time, estimated population of the municipality was 25,000. According to the 2002 census the population of the administratively much smaller local community of Pašino Brdo was 3,808, with a few small adjoining neighborhoods 10,774, while in 2011 population was 3,997 and 10,656.
