= Marinkova Bara =

Marinkova Bara Маринкова Бара
- Urban neighbourhood
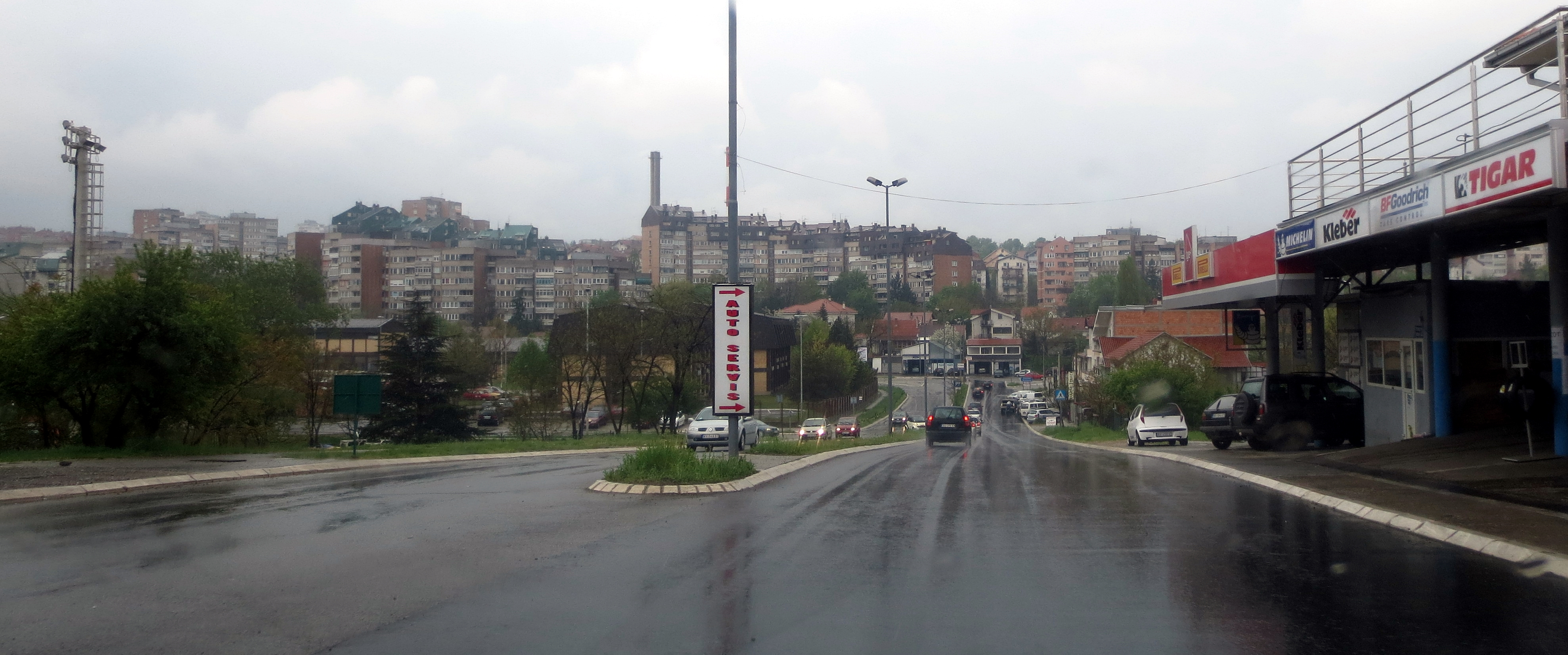
- Marinkova Bara

- Location within Belgrade
- Coordinates: 44°46′54″N 20°29′21″E
- Country: Serbia
- Region: Belgrade
- Municipality: Voždovac

Population 2011
  - Total: 6,574
- Time zone: UTC+1 (CET)
  - Summer (DST): UTC+2 (CEST)
- Area code: +381(0)11
- Car plates: BG

Marinkova Bara (Serbian: Маринкова Бара) is an urban neighborhood of Belgrade, the capital of Serbia. It is located in the municipality of Voždovac.

== Location ==
Marinkova Bara (Serbian for "Marinko's bog") is located in the northern section of the municipality, along the southern side of the Belgrade-Niš highway, in the valley of the Mokroluški potok. It is bordered by the neighborhoods of Dušanovac (west), Braće Jerković (south), Medaković (south-east & east) and Konjarnik (north, across the highway).

== History ==
Before the settlement was founded, it was a wooded area below what is today Central Cemetery. In the early 19th century it was part of the domain of Marinko Marinković, obor-knez of Avala. After him, the wood was called Marinkova šuma (Marinko's wood) and later, when the village developed, it was also named after him. Marinkova Bara originates from the 1920s and 1930s when the small village was the eastern suburb of Belgrade. One half of the settlement developed in the valley, at the confluence of the Duboki potok and Kumodraški potok creeks into the Mokroluški potok. Other half extended into the hills and slopes above, around the modern Zaplanjska street.

In the 1890s, location of the Belgrade Hippodrome was moved from the area of the modern Vukov Spomenik neighborhood to Marinkova Bara. At the beginning of the 20th century, the hippodrome was moved to Banjica.

In one of the efforts during the Interbellum to demolish the shanty town of Jatagan Mala, city administration demolished the largest part of the settlement in 1939–40, when 450 houses were razed to the ground, and the inhabitants were forcibly resettled to Marinkova Bara.

From June 1945 to December 1946, Marinkova Bara was one of 5 administrative neighborhoods within Belgrade's Raion VI.

In November 1968, city announced optimistic plans to resettle the entire Marinkova Bara, classified as an informal settlement at the time, and estimated to have a population of over 20,000. A total of 1,100 new building apartments were planned, which in turn developed into the Medaković neighborhood. Construction was planned to start in the spring of 1968, while the complete resettlement was to be finished by 1971. The sewage connection with the Kumodraž sewage collector was also planned. The city then dropped Marinkova Bara from the 1969 relocation plan and the construction of the new buildings was postponed for later that year. Though the new settlements of Medaković II and Medaković III were finished in the 1970s and early 1980s, the majority of Marinkova Bara wasn't demolished or resettled.

Mokroluški potok was later conducted underground, into the city's sewage system. It has been conducted below the ground in Marinkova Bara, where the pouring cascade was built to carry the water into the sewage collector, while the bed of the Mokroluški potok, prior to reaching the cascade, has been channeled. The entire complex was renovated in 2009 when the new parallel canal, the grid above the collector, and the protective fence have been built.

== Characteristics ==
Historical population
Year	Pop.	±%
1981	8,500	—
1991	7,536	−11.3%
2002	6,930	−8.0%
2011	6,574	−5.1%

It is mostly a low-class neighborhood, with the common yards and small, individual houses. Most of the population are the Romani, but as the neighborhood is old, it is fully urbanized and thus not classified as an informal settlement. It is known for many small stores, repair and craftsmen shops, etc. Some of the installations of the Serbian power company, Elektrodistribucija and facilities of the Belgrade's communal company are located in the western parts of the neighborhood. The Branislav Nušić elementary school was established in the neighborhood in 1935.

The IMO bridge, built as the temporary one in the 1970s, connects Marinkova Bara with the major thoroughfares across the highway, Ustanička and Kruševačka streets. The bridge was later several times upgraded, becoming a permanent one. On the Marinkova Bara side, the streets fork in the directions of major streets in this area, like Zaplanjska and Kumodraška. Also, here is the exit/access (Dušanovac exit) to the highway, on both sides. As the streets in Marinkova Bara are narrow and under angles, especially the short Husova Street which leads to and from the highway, since the 2010s this caused major, constant traffic jams on both sides of the bridge, but especially on the Marinkova Bara's side. Along the Husova Street are shanties, some of which crumbled in time, several hurting passersby and damaging cars and buses on the street. This section of the neighborhood has been compared to favelas. For decades, no effort was made to fix the situation. Architect Zdravko Zdravković, who was a councillor in Voždovac's municipal assembly, wrote that when he asked one politician why is this problem not being solved, he got an answer: "a politician who would try to reconstruct Marinkova Bara, will be a dead politician".

== Siva Stena ==
Siva Stena (Serbian: Сива Стена) is the southern extension of Marinkova Bara, formerly considered to be one the same neighborhood. Today, center of the neighborhood is located around the street of the same name, which connects Braće Jerković street on the west and Zaplanjska street on the east. Many areas of former Marinkova Bara-Siva Stena neighborhood which was periphery of Belgrade before World War II are today occupied by the Central Cemetery, built in 1939, while the eastern and southern extensions were detached and since the 1960s urbanized into the modern neighborhoods of Medaković I and Braće Jerković, respectively.

Today, Siva Stena forms a local community (mesna zajednica), administrative sub-municipal unit, within the municipality of Voždovac and forms urban connection between the neighborhoods of Marinkova Bara, Medaković I, Braće Jerković, Dušanovac and Voždovac itself. According to the last census from 2011, it had a population of 6,574. Despite the influx of refugees as the result of the Yugoslav Wars from 1991 and migrations from South Serbia, especially from the Leskovac region, population has been steadily declining for decades.
