= Mokroluški potok =

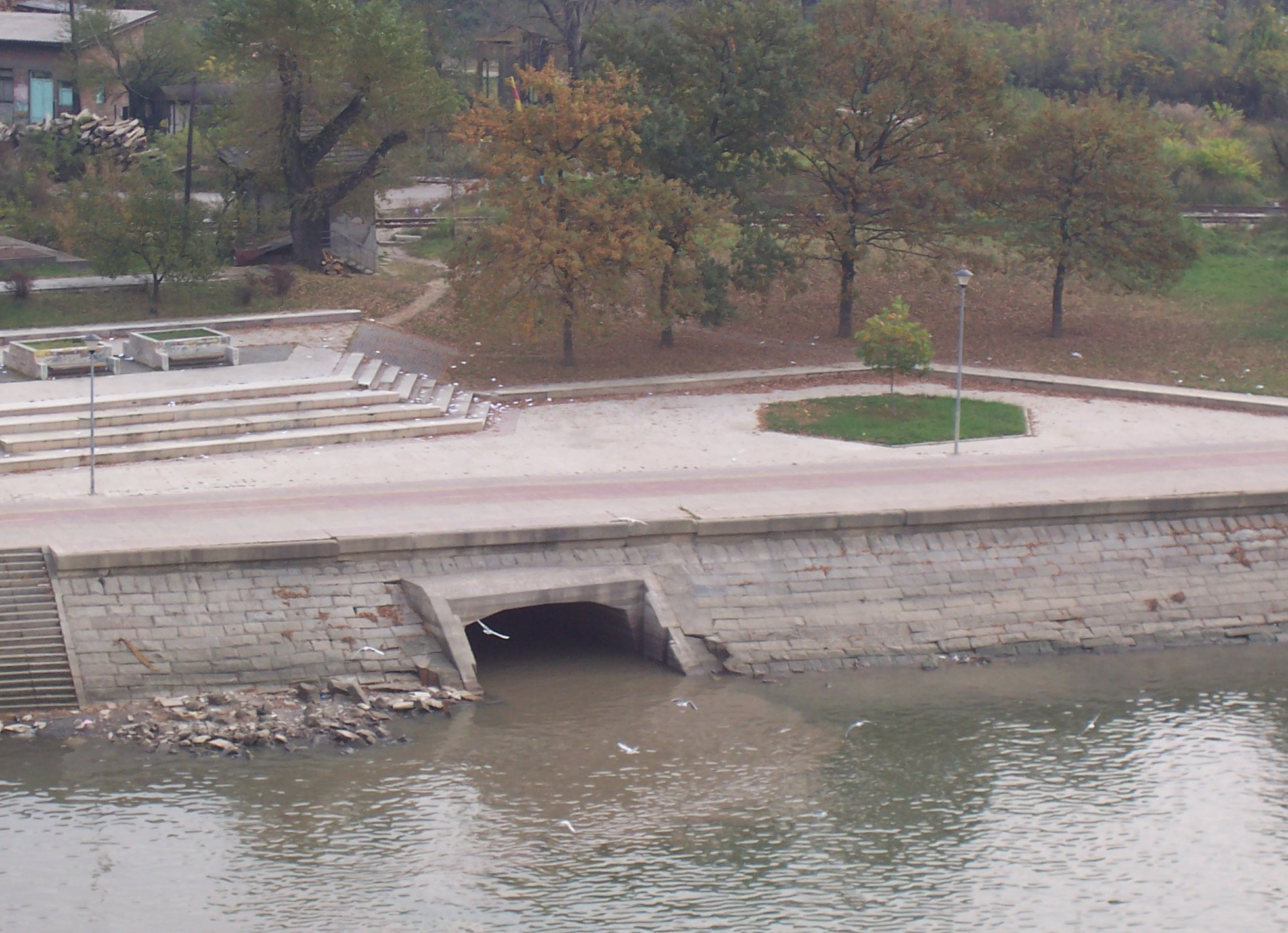
- Channeled mouth of the Mokroluški potok into the Sava, under the Gazela Bridge
- Native name: Мокролушки поток (Serbian)

Location
- Country: Serbia

Physical characteristics
- Source
  - location: Veliki Mokri Lug, east Belgrade, Serbia
- Mouth
  - location: Sava, at Belgrade, Serbia
  - coordinates: 44°48′5.2632″N 20°26′30.7644″E
- Length: approx. 15 km (9.3 mi)

Basin features
- Progression: Sava→ Danube→ Black Sea

The Mokroluški potok (Serbian: Мокролушки поток, Mokroluški potok, lit. 'Mokri Lug Creek') is a stream in north-central Serbia, which forms a 15-kilometre-long (9-mile) former right tributary to the Sava river. During its entire course, it runs through the urban section of Belgrade. It is one of the 40 rivers, streams and creeks that flow or used to flow through Belgrade, but the majority of them are conducted underground into the city sewage system which is also the case with Mokroluški potok.

== Course ==
The Mokroluški potok originates in Belgrade's eastern neighborhood of Veliki Mokri Lug, in the municipality of Zvezdara, which also gives the name to the stream (Mokri Lug stream). The Mokroluški potok flows generally in a north-west direction and its valley is used as a route for the Belgrade-Niš highway (constructed 1967-74). After it passes the cemetery of the neighboring Mali Mokri Lug, it reaches the neighborhood of Medaković III where the stream is conducted underground for the first time. The channeled mouth of the stream is still visible under the Gazela Bridge.

After an underground flow of about one kilometer, the stream resurfaces in the neighborhood of Medaković II, but one kilometer later, in the neighborhood of Marinkova Bara, it goes underground again. Formerly, it used to flow through the neighborhoods of Dušanovac, Autokomanda and Jatagan Mala. The area in the lower valley of the now underground stream was used for digging earth and gravel which were used to cover and drain the swamps on the Sava's right bank, so that neighborhoods of Savamala and Bara Venecija could be constructed, and for the building of Belgrade's central railway station. After the works were completed, the area around Mokroluški potok was left as a steep, elongated cut in the ground and so was given its present name (Prokop).

The stream was mostly conducted underground in the 1970s. Before it was channeled, the stream often flooded the area of Dušanovac and Marinkova Bara during the heavy rains, as it was where it received two tributaries, Duboki potok from the north and Kumodraški potok, from the south.

== Characteristics ==
The valley of the creek was a route for the Roman aqueduct, which conducted the waters from the Mokri Lug area to the Singidunum castrum. At some point, it received waters from another aqueduct, from the left, which originated in the modern neighborhood of Kumodraž. Both Mokri Lug and Kumodraž are located on the hills, so the natural inclination allowed for the water to flow downhill to Singidunum.

At Mostar, before flowing into the Sava, northern slopes of Senjak hill descended to the streams left bank. Up to the 19th century, the slope was known as Zamastir. Czech émigré Heinrich Smutek, arranged a large estate (with a brickyard) and a garden in the area, and opened a kafana "Smutekovac". As it became highly popular with the Belgraders, the name Zamastir was in time replaced with Smutekovac. The slope above the stream became one of the main excursion areas for the citizens. In the 1870s the area was purchased and parceled by Đorđe Vajfert who opened the brewery in 1872.

Though undistinguished in terms of hydrology, the stream was important in Belgrade geography, while in architecture it has been described as the "key topology character of Belgrade's history". Its valley serves as the route for the highway. A small bridge (most) over the stream, near its mouth into the Sava, gave name to the local kafana "Mostar" after which, in turn, the entire neighborhood was named Mostar. In architecture, "the narrative of the Belgrade's terrain ended steeply at the (stream's) line, finalizing the development of Sava amphitheater and marking the edge of the city in its next spreading to the south, further from the Belgrade Fortress and the Trench (which surrounded it)".
