= Gazela Bridge =

Bridge in Belgrade, Serbia

Gazela Bridge Mост Газела Most Gazela
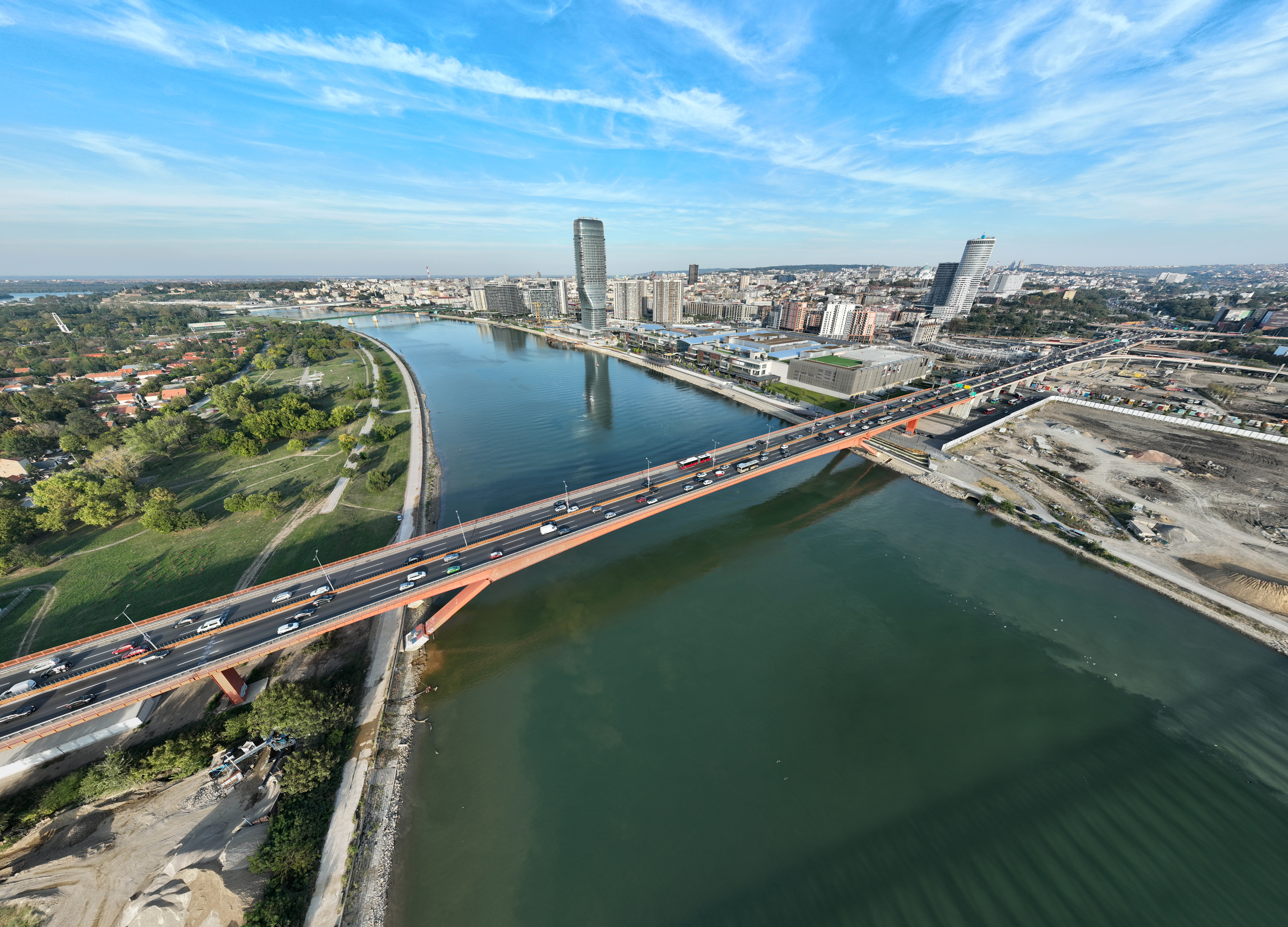
- Gazela Bridge (2023)
- Coordinates: 44°48′10″N 20°26′27″E
- Carries: 6 lanes of the M11
- Crosses: Sava river

Characteristics
- Design: Beam and arch, shallow-frame beam, diagonal steel-concrete abutments
- Total length: 332 m (1,089 ft)
- Width: 27.5 m (90 ft)
- Height: 22.8 m (72 ft)
- Longest span: 250 m

History
- Designer: Milan Đurić
- Construction start: 1966
- Construction end: 1970
- Opened: 4 December 1970; 55 years ago

Statistics
- Daily traffic: 157,594 (2025)
- Toll: No

Location
- Interactive map of Gazela Bridge; Mост Газела; Most Gazela

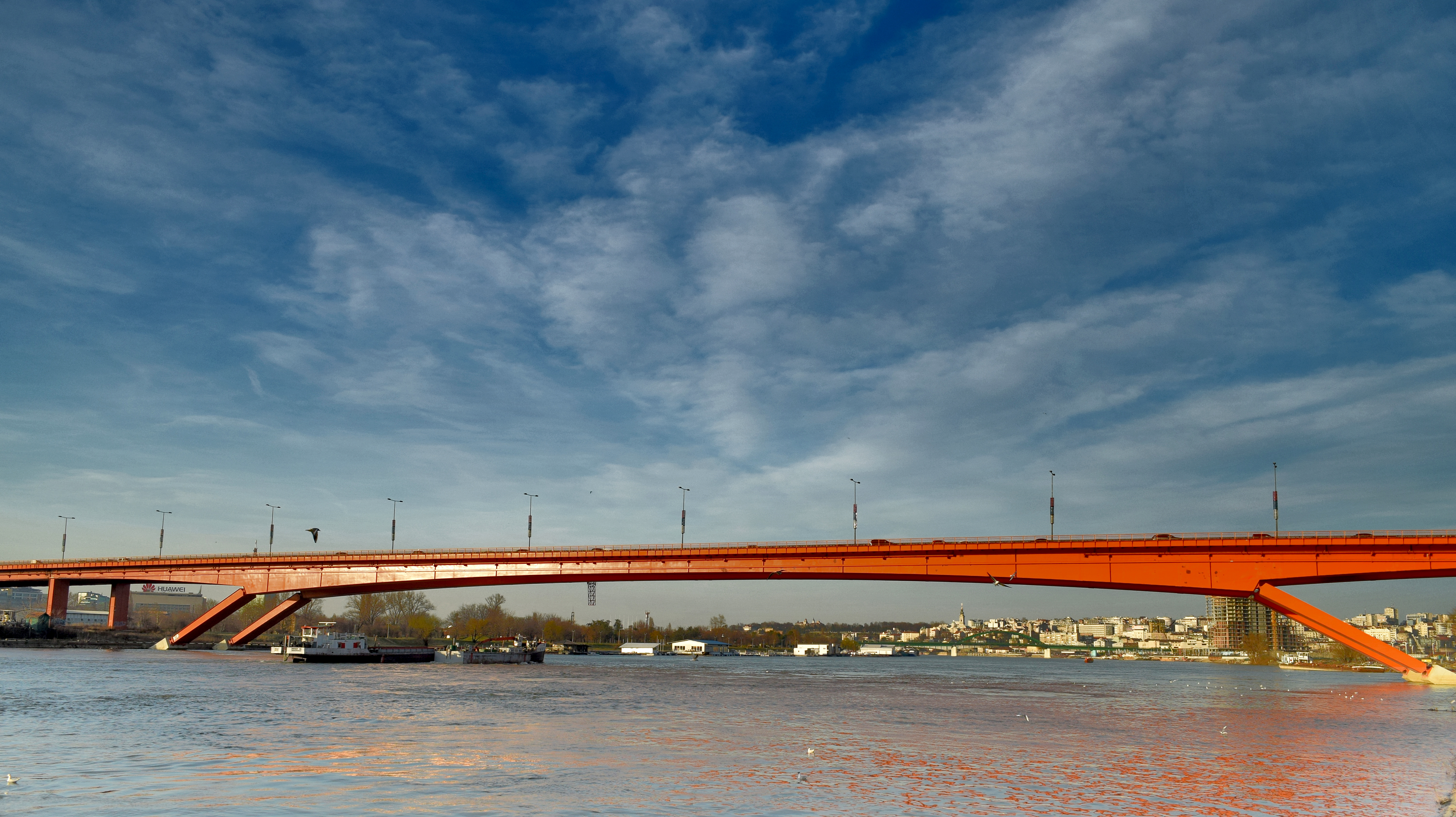
Gazela bridge

The Gazela Bridge (Serbian: Mост Газела, romanized: Most Gazela) is the most important bridge over the Sava river in Belgrade, the capital of Serbia. It is a part of the city highway, and it lies on the local M11 expressway, on the expressway passing through the wider city center, connecting western parts of the city with eastern. The bridge was designed by a group of engineers led by Milan Đurić, and built by the Mostogradnja company.

== Name ==
The name of the bridge, gazela is Serbian for "gazelle". Đorđe Lazarević, who was president of the competition commission, said that "this bridge leaped over the Sava like a jumping gazelle", and the name stuck. Already by 1968, two years before the bridge was completed, the name appeared in news reports.

In the late 2010s, there were proposals to rename the bridge after Branko Pešić, mayor of Belgrade during the bridge's construction, but the name wasn't changed.

== History ==
By the mid-1960s a need for another road bridge across the Sava was apparent as the only bridge, built in 1956, was Branko's Bridge. The idea behind the new bridge was to connect parts of the Brotherhood and Unity Highway. The most distinguished engineers were summoned to choose the best project. Between the projects submitted on the architectural design competition, a design by Milan Đurić was selected.

Construction of the bridge began in 1966, and it was built by the companies Mostogradnja and Goša. It was finished in 4 years. The two sides of the bridge were physically connected on 17 December 1969. The testing of the bridge was directly broadcast by the Radio Television Belgrade. Citizens joked, saying that the truck drivers who tested the bridge should be equipped with the diving suits. The bridge was ceremonially opened by the President of Yugoslavia Josip Broz Tito and mayor of Belgrade Branko Pešić on 4 December 1970. On that same day, apart from the bridge, a highway through Belgrade, the Mostar Interchange and the Terazije Tunnel were all open.

=== 2010–2011 reconstruction ===
In 2004, Minister for construction Dragoslav Šumarac warned that the bridge, especially the steel construction, is in a bad shape and that immediate reconstruction is needed. The main carrier of the bridge turned out to be cracked in 2010, so the reconstruction had to start immediately. Additional 1,500 tons of steel and other materials were used to strengthen the construction. The bridge's overhaul started in the first half of 2010 and was finished in the second half of 2011. This is the first major reconstruction of the bridge since its completion in 1970. As the bridge is part of the E75 International Road (motorway), there were traffic rushes throughout the day. It would sometimes take an hour just to cross the bridge. Vehicles over 3.5 tons were prohibited from entering the city if in transit, and were instead diverted to the Belgrade bypass. However, as the Belgrade Bypass is only half completed, this posed a challenge for some truck drivers. To make matters worse, the bridge has been closed in its entirety for 7 days, causing unprecedented traffic chaos in Belgrade. To speed up the reconstruction, hundreds of workers were on the bridge 24 hours a day, 7 days a week. As a result, the bridge's overhaul was completed in record time.

The state and the city government had different opinions when the reconstruction was to start. The state insisted that the works should start as soon as possible, due to the bad shape of the bridge, while the city thought it would be better to finish the Ada Bridge first and then work on the Gazela. During the works, European Investment Bank withdrew the funds as they didn't approve how the problem of the informal settlement of the Cardboard city below the bridge was handled. Still, there was no overall delay.

As a result of the reconstruction, the traffic congestion was massive and regular, with jams stretching all the way to the Autokomanda and Dušanovac neighborhoods. Just prior to the reconstruction, the city has expanded the Savska street, which is connected to the Gazela, and during the works, the city government pleaded to drivers to use other bridges and even the city's commuter rail Beovoz was free of charge during that time. But the drivers continued using the partially closed Gazela nevertheless, causing jams.

Since its reconstruction, city officials stated the bridge would be able to handle 200,000 vehicles daily for the next 40 years.

== Characteristics ==
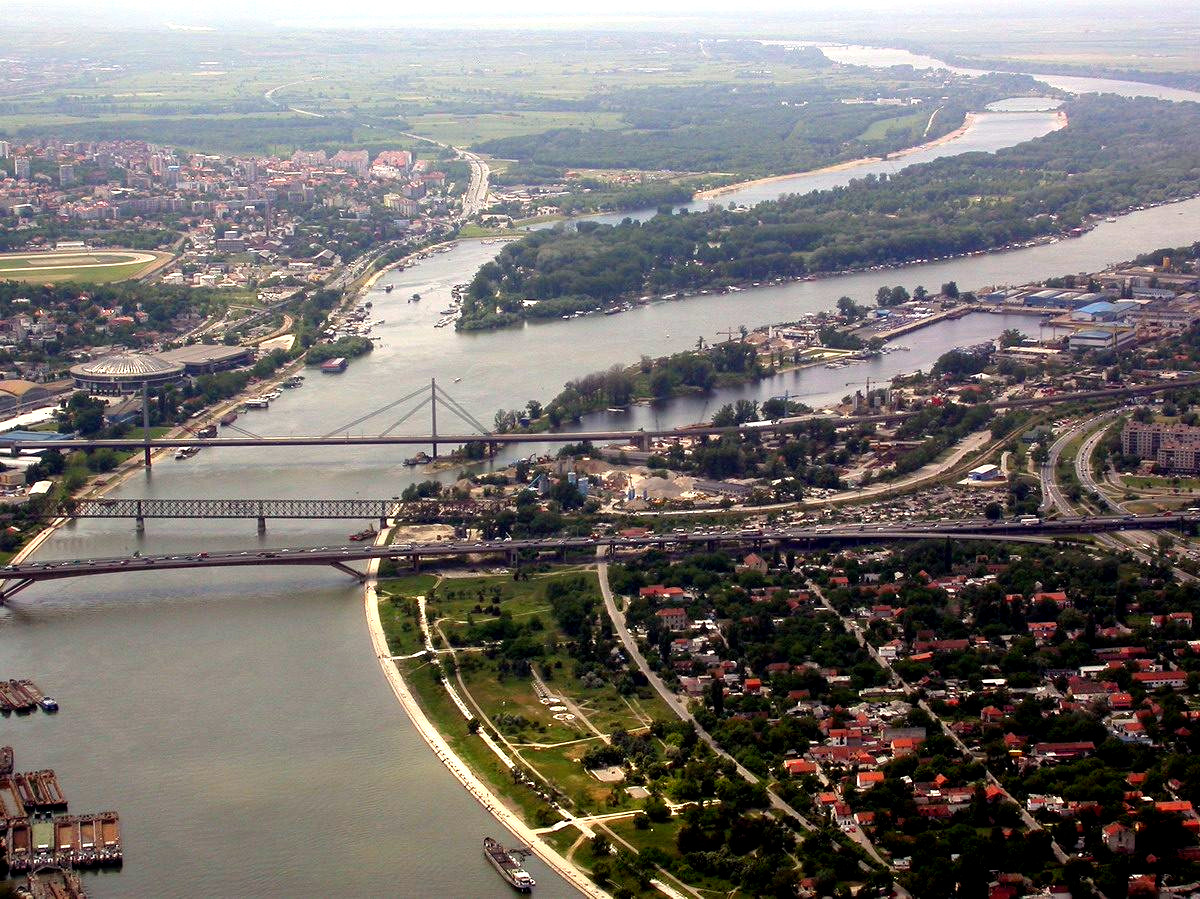
Overview of the three Belgrade bridges: Gazela Bridge, Old Railroad Bridge, and New Railroad Bridge.

The bridge is 332 m (1,089 ft) long and 27.5 m (90 ft) wide, with three lanes in each direction, and total road width of 21.8 m (72 ft). It is constructed as a combination of beam and arch, with shallow-frame beam and diagonal steel-concrete abutments. The maximum height of the span centre is 22.8 m (75 ft) at median water level.

Immediately after the opening in 1970, a defect was noticed. Due to the miscalculations, the metallic construction began to depress in the middle of the bridge. By the 2010 reconstruction, it became visible both by watching the bridge from the side or crossing it. In order to alleviate the problem, on the metallic sections of the bridge, the concrete shoulders were replaced with the lighter, metallic ones.

== Traffic ==
The bridge is the main connection between downtown Belgrade and New Belgrade, and also carries the transit traffic on E70 and E75 highways through Serbia. As such, it is extremely overloaded and a cause of frequent congestion, as it leans on the main Belgrade's Mostar interchange. On average over 165,000 vehicles cross it every day (notwithstanding the impeded flow), even though it was designed to be used by 38,000. However, the bridge was almost completely redone in 2011, and it now supports up to 200,000 vehicles per day. Additional relief is expected when the Belgrade bypass is completed, which is currently under construction. There was also a significant relief when the new Ada Bridge was opened for traffic, on 1 January 2012.

== See also ==
- List of bridges in Serbia

== Sources ==
- "The Gazela bridge - Belgrade". YU Build. Archived from the original on 2007-09-28.
- "Belgrade Bypass, Serbia". CEE Bankwatch network. Archived from the original on 2007-06-09.
- Dr. Mihajlo Maletin (2005-09-15). "Projekat bezimenih komisija" (in Serbian). Archived from the original on 2011-07-25.
- "Beogradu preti saobraćajni kolaps". B92. 2007-10-20.
- "U iščekivanju saobraćjnog kolapsa". Vreme. 2007-07-26.
