= Braće Jerković =

Braće Jerković Браће Јерковић
- Urban neighbourhood
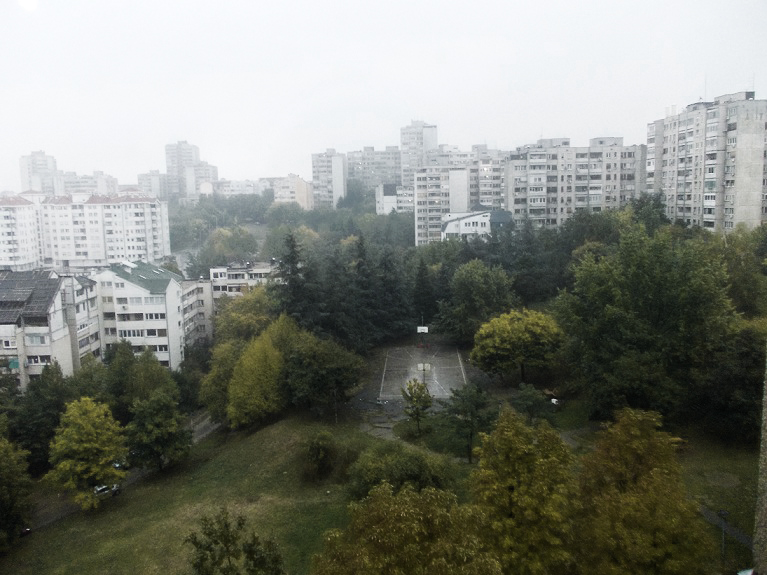
- Braće Jerković

- Location within Belgrade
- Coordinates: 44°46′09″N 20°29′20″E
- Country: Serbia
- Region: Belgrade
- Municipality: Voždovac

Area
  - Total: 0.49 km^{2} (0.19 sq mi)

Population (2011)
  - Total: 23,162
  - Density: 47,000/km^{2} (120,000/sq mi)
- Time zone: UTC+1 (CET)
  - Summer (DST): UTC+2 (CEST)
- Area code: +381(0)11
- Car plates: BG

Braće Jerković or colloquially Jerković (Serbian Cyrillic: Браће Јерковић or Јерковић; pronounced [brât͡ɕɛː jɛ̌ːrkɔv̞it͡ɕ]) is an urban neighborhood of Belgrade, the capital of Serbia. It is located in Belgrade's municipality of Voždovac.

== Location ==
Braće Jerković is located between the valleys of the former creeks of Kumodraški potok and Mokroluški potok. It borders the neighborhoods of Marinkova Bara (north), Dušanovac (north-west), Voždovac (west), Medaković II (north-east), Padina (east), while in the south it extends into the neighborhood of Braće Jerković II. It is bounded by the elbow-shaped street of the same name (on the west and south) and the street of Ignjata Joba (on the east). Northern border to Dušanovac and Marinkova Bara, just as it case with many neighborhoods of Belgrade, can not be clearly established, though majority of city maps place it between the Darvinova and Ignjata Joba streets.

== Name and history ==
Historical population
Year	Pop.	±%
1981	23,527	—
1991	25,801	+9.7%
2002	24,010	−6.9%
2011	23,162	−3.5%

The name of the neighborhood means "Jerković Brothers" and it was named after two brothers, fighters during the World War II, who were both killed in 1941. Nebojša (1912–41), commander of the Mačva partisan detachment, and Dušan Jerković (1914–41), commander of the Užice partisan detachment, were both teachers. Dušan was killed during the Battle of Kadinjača, in November 1941, and was declared a National Hero of Yugoslavia. A street, which is a central one in the neighborhood now, was named in their honor in 1946 as well as the neighborhood which later developed around it.

== Characteristics ==
Even though it leans on the Voždovac's industrial zone along the Kumodraška street, the neighborhood itself is entirely residential, built since the 1960s and the newer sections consist solely of residential buildings. The population of the local community Braće Jerković was 13,413 in 1981, 13,225 in 1991, 11,453 in 2002, and 9,661 in 2011, while the combined population of Braće Jerković and Mitrovo Brdo was 23,162 in 2011 and is often named as one of the largest neighborhoods in both municipality of Voždovac and the city of Belgrade.

The main feature in the neighborhood is the Centralno groblje ("central cemetery", 2.87 hectares (7.1 acres)), one of two main graveyards in urban Belgrade (the other one being the Novo groblje ("new cemetery") in Zvezdara. The church dedicated to Birth of Saint John the Baptist is within the cemetery complex.

There are three elementary schools in the neighborhood: "Branislav Nušić" (founded in 1935), "Zmaj Jova Jovanović" (founded in 1967), and "Đura Daničić" (moved from Zvezdara in 1970).

In the central part of the neighborhood, in the park next to the health care center, there are busts of the Jerković brothers and the memorial plaque. Work of sculptor Radmila Graovac, they were placed in 1979, in the park's section called Tito's memorial rose garden. There is another monument dedicated to the brothers, in a different part of the city. It is placed in front of the elementary school "Braća Jerković" in the neighborhood of Železnik.

A green area between the streets of Braće Jerković, Jovana Bijelića and Meštrovićeva was reconstructed in May 2017 and turned into a mini-park which covers an area of 890 m^{2} (9,600 sq ft). It has two children's playgrounds and area for the senior citizens. New paths were placed so as the new lawn. Seedlings of the white birch were planted, so as the both deciduous and evergreen shrubs, including honeysuckle and Syrian rosemallow.

In May 2023, it was announced that 20 ha (49 acres) of largely uninhabited or formerly industrialized area along the entire west and southwest section of Braće Jerković will be urbanized. The zone is bounded by the streets of Darvinova on the north, Braće Jerković on the east, Bulevar Peke Dapčevića on the west, and Kružni put on the south. The project envisions a total floor area of 520,000 m^{2} (5,600,000 sq ft) of residential buildings and growth of population from 1,273 in 2023, to 13,000.

In November 2023, the neighborhood was chosen as the site for the monument to Milunka Savić, a Serbian World War I heroine. The monument will be located in Fontana Park, replacing the defunct fountain.

== Braće Jerković II ==
Braće Jerković II or Veljko Vlahović (Serbian Cyrillic: Вељко Влаховић) was officially assigned name to the newer, southern extension of the neighborhood. It occupies the area between the streets of Braće Jerković, Pive Karamatijevića and Dragice Končar. Even though built in the 1970s, the name didn't live up and except for some official uses (like the real estate agencies advertising or the official style of the terminal station of the bus line 26). It was named after the Communist politician Veljko Vlahović (1914–75). In the early 2000s the name of the neighborhood was officially changed to Mitrovo Brdo. It had a population of 10,114 in 1981, 12,576 in 1991, 12,557 in 2002 and 13,501 in 2011.

== Braće Jerković III ==
Eastern, residential extension of the neighborhood. It is located between the streets of Dragice Končar on the south, Ignjata Joba on the north and Svetozara Radojčića on the east, with Central cemetery on the north-west. Main street in the neighborhood is Indire Gandi.
