= Dušanovac, Belgrade =

Dušanovac Душановац
- Urban neighbourhood
- Location within Belgrade
- Coordinates: 44°46′59″N 20°28′59″E
- Country: Serbia
- Region: Belgrade
- Municipality: Voždovac

Area
  - Total: 0.4 km^{2} (0.15 sq mi)
- Time zone: UTC+1 (CET)
  - Summer (DST): UTC+2 (CEST)
- Area code: +381(0)11
- Car plates: BG

Dušanovac (Serbian Cyrillic: Душановац, pronounced [duʃǎːnoʋats]), is an urban and historical neighbourhood of Belgrade, the capital of Serbia. It is located in the municipality of Voždovac.

== Location ==
The Dušanovac is bounded by the other Belgrade neighbourhoods: Autokomanda to the west, Pašino Brdo to the north, Šumice, Konjarnik, Marinkova Bara, Medaković and Braće Jerković to the east, and Voždovac itself to the south.

== History ==
As a pre-World War I suburb of Belgrade, in the area that was eastern border of the city at that time, Dušanovac was administratively part of the municipality of Kumodraž. After the liberation in World War I in 1918, the neighborhood came under Belgrade's administrative rule. A string of new or expanded and renovated neighborhoods encircled eastern outskirts of Belgrade after the war. The inspiration for the design of the neighborhoods came from the complex built in 1912 along the Daviel Street in Paris. It consisted of 40 one-floor houses with gardens, indented from the main street. This style became very popular across the Europe. Within the scopes of this process, Dušanovac began to develop rapidly in the 1920s, and before World War II caught Yugoslavia in 1941, the area was fully urbanized and made continuous urban area with the rest of the city.

Despite being a residential settlement on the outskirts of Belgrade, and not having industrial or military facilities, Dušanovac and the neighboring Pašino Brdo were partially demolished during the heavy „Easter bombing“ of Belgrade by the Allies on 16 April 1944.

From June 1945 to December 1946, Dušanovac was one of 5 administrative neighborhoods within Belgrade’s Raion VI.

Since the 1960s and 1970s new, vast in area boroughs were developed further to the east, like Šumice and Konjarnik which connected Belgrade in one continuous urban area with former villages of Mali Mokri Lug, Veliki Mokri Lug, Kaluđerica, Leštane, Vinča and Boleč, so today, the Dušanovac is closer to the downtown Belgrade (10 minutes by public bus) than to the eastern outskirts of the city.

== Characteristics ==
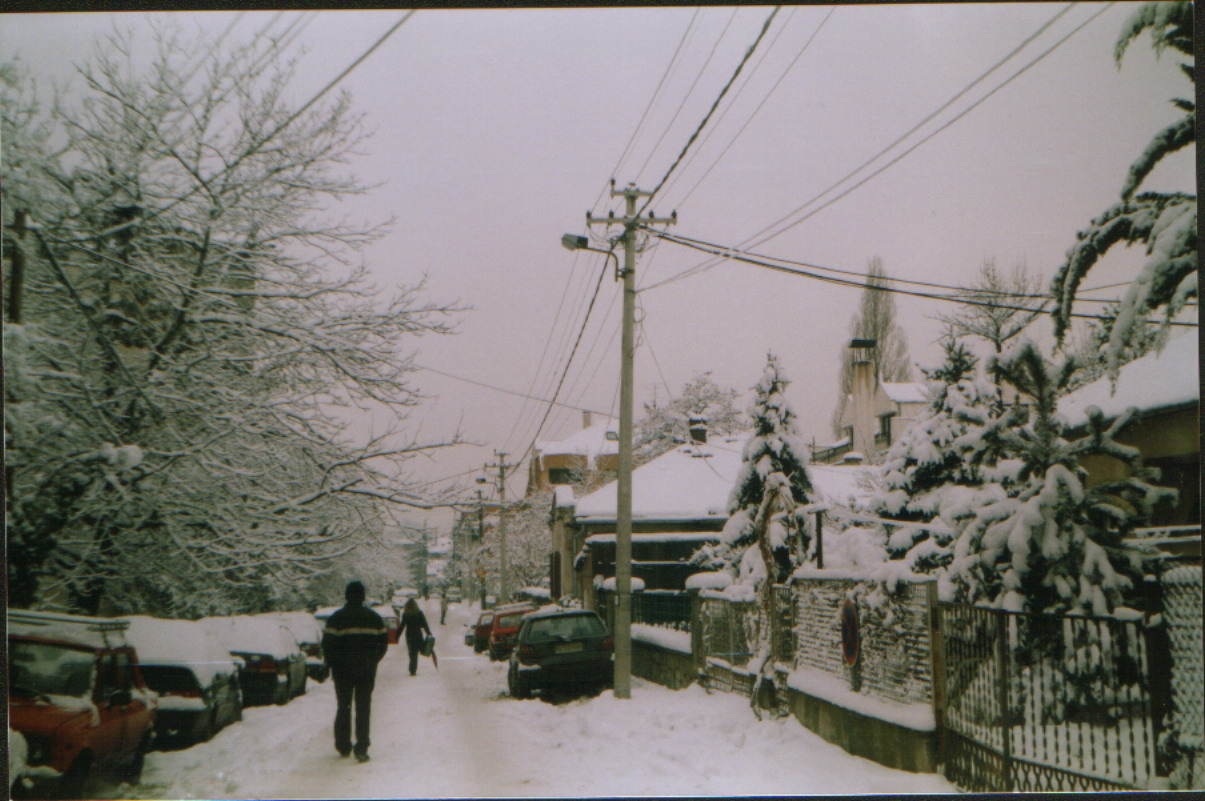
Dusanovac in winter

Dušanovac was always an area with working class population, settled in predominantly small-to-medium houses with backyards. It is mostly residential area without major industrial objects. However, in 1974 a Belgrade-Niš highway was constructed right through the neighbourhood, splitting it in two parts, and along the highway huge car shops, exhibitor's salons, restaurants and other commercial objects are still being built. Located right next to the highway is also an open produce market Dušanovačka pijaca (Cyrillic: Душановачка пијаца; Market of Dušanovac), one of the major ones in Belgrade.

The population of Dušanovac was 7,301 in 2002 and 6,283 in 2011.

An area to the north, between the highway and Ustanička Street (Cyrillic: Устаничка; Street of the Rebellion(s)) is turned into an administrative center, including the municipal assembly of Voždovac, the police and fire station, the local clinical-ambulance center, the Fifth Municipal Court of Belgrade and the Special section of the Supreme court of Serbia for organized crime and war crimes (formerly the Supreme Military Court of Yugoslavia), or colloquially called the Special Court.

Special Court

The building of the Special Court served as the Supreme Military Court until the military judiciary was abolished. After the assassination of prime minister Zoran Đinđić in 2003, the building was thoroughly renovated and adapted for the trials concerning the organized crime and war crimes. Defense minister of Yugoslavia Boris Tadić handed over the keys to the Serbian justice minister Vladan Batić on 24 October 2003, after the adaptation was completed. The building was transformed by the Italian model of the high risk mafia trials, with the latest generation of the audio-visual-safety equipment, previously unseen in this part of Europe.

The largest courtroom in the building, Courtroom 1, is also the largest one in the entire Serbia: there are 500 seats in the audience and the dock is large enough for 50 accuseds. Courtroom 2, named after the Italian judge Giovanni Falcone, is smaller, with the dock set for the groups of 10. The building has also a detention unit and the inner parking, accessible via a specially guarded gate and fenced with high walls.

In August 2018 it was announced that the building will be expanded, with additional 4,000 m^{2} (43,000 sq ft). The expansion will actually be a completely new building, adjacent to the old one. It is planned for the Prosecutors office for the organized crime which will move out of the old building leaving it solely to the court business. Works are planned for 2018 and to be finished by 2020 in a 1-1,5 years.

== Transportation ==
Dušanovac is well connected with other parts of the city, by public transportation:

Buses (with connecting areas of the city):

- No. 17: Konjarnik, Autokomanda, Mostarska Petlja, Novi Beograd, Zemun;
- No. 25: Voždovac, Braće Jerković, Lekino Brdo, Kalenić, Vukov Spomenik, Bogoslovija, Karaburma;
- No. 26: Voždovac, Braće Jerković, Lekino Brdo, Kalenić, Vukov Spomenik, Tašmajdan, Square of the Republic, Dorćol
- No. 30: Marinkova Bara, Slavija;
- No. 31: Konjarnik, Slavija, Terazije, Square of the Republic, Kalemegdan;
