= Veliki Mokri Lug =

Veliki Mokri Lug Велики Мокри Луг
- Urban neighbourhood
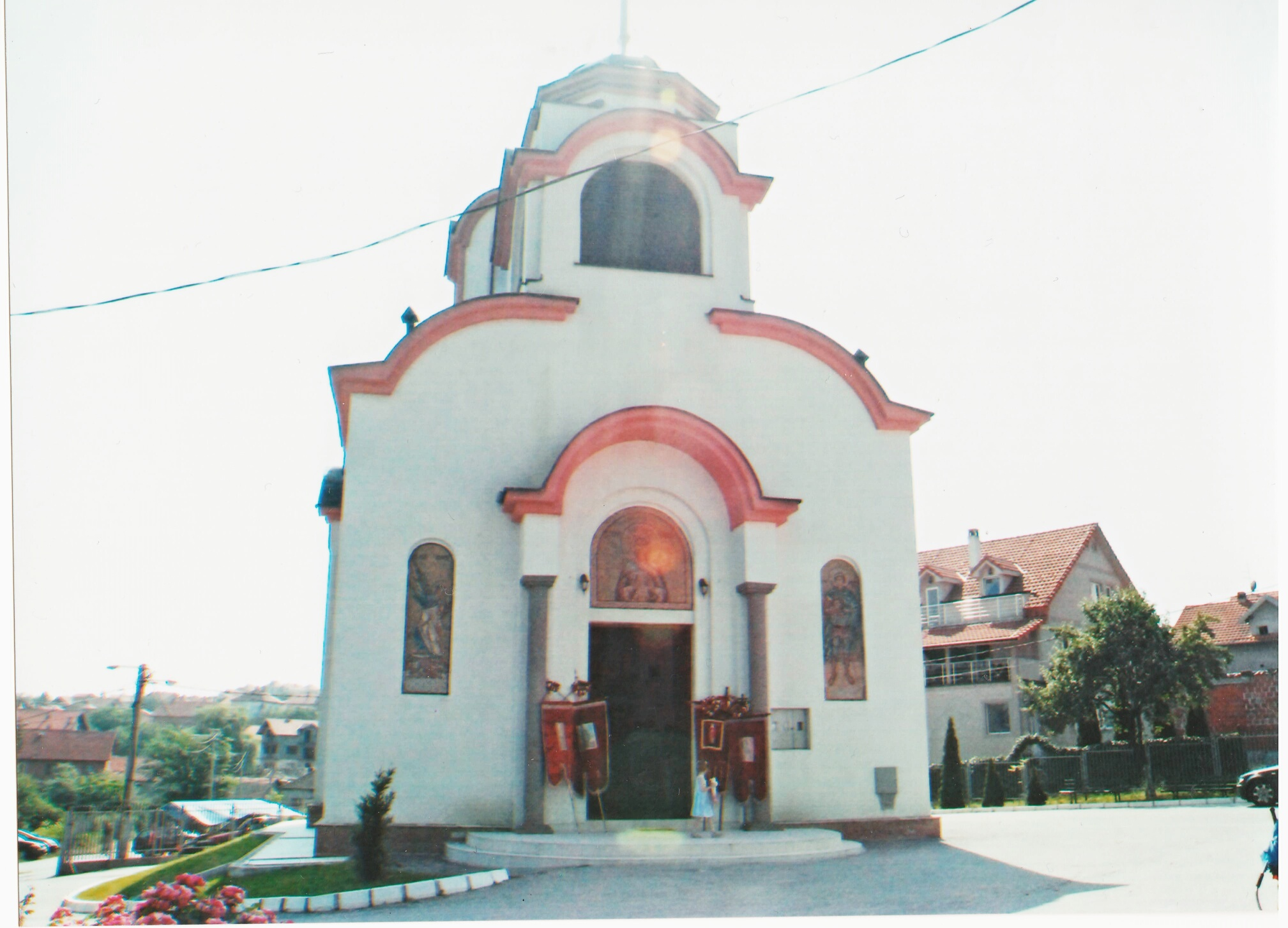
- Church of Saint Hieromartyr Kyriaki

- Location within Belgrade
- Coordinates: 44°46′N 20°32′E
- Country: Serbia
- Region: Belgrade
- Municipality: Zvezdara

Area
  - Total: 6.06 km^{2} (2.34 sq mi)
- Time zone: UTC+1 (CET)
  - Summer (DST): UTC+2 (CEST)
- Area code: +381(0)11
- Car plates: BG

Veliki Mokri Lug (Serbian Cyrillic: Велики Мокри Луг) is an urban neighbourhood of Belgrade, Serbia. It is located in Belgrade's municipality of Zvezdara.

== Location ==
Veliki Mokri Lug is the southernmost neighborhood of the municipality of Zvezdara, located on the right side of the Highway Belgrade–Niš. Surrounding area is still largely unurbanized, but it makes continuous built up area with several other neighborhoods, mostly along roads: Kaluđerica on the west, Mali Mokri Lug on the north, Kumodraž on the south and Padina and Medaković III, through Cvetanova Ćuprija.

== Geography ==
Veiki Mokri Lug is located east of the Kumodraž field, on two hills, Mokroluško Brdo (234 meters) on the west and Stražarska Kosa, on the south. The settlement developed in the headwaters area of Mokroluški Potok, a right tributary to the Sava river, which flows between slopes of these two hills. The area is generally rich in springs and wells, which is obvious from many of the settlement's toponyms (streets like Petko's well, Miloš' well, Mitke's well, Little spring, Buljubaša's waters, Creek street) so as from its own name (veliki mokri lug is Serbian for "large wet grove" as opposed to Mali Mokri Lug, "little wet grove").

== History and population ==
During the Roman period, the Romans built an aqueduct to conduct water from the hill on which the modern Veliki Mokri Lug is located. At some point it was joining the aqueduct from the nearby Kumodraž Hill, and the water was further conducted to the castrum of Singidunum, predecessor of modern Belgrade. Natural inclination of two hills was used for the water to flow all the way to the city.

Stražarska Kosa, eastern and southeastern part of the settlement is the oldest section of Veliki Mokri Lug. As such, it is one of the oldest neighborhoods on the territory of modern Zvezdara municipality.

Until the 1970s, Veliki Mokri Lug was a separate village and a suburban settlement of Belgrade. With the massive administrative reorganization of the Belgrade City limits after the 1971 population census, entire eastern and southern string of more or less urbanized suburbs (Višnjica, Mirijevo, Mali Mokri Lug, Veliki Mokri Lug, Selo Rakovica, Jajinci, Kijevo, Kneževac, Resnik, Železnik, Žarkovo) were administratively annexed to the Belgrade City proper (uža teritorija grada), turning from the separate settlements into the "local communities" (mesna zajednica), sub-municipal administrative unit. Population of Veliki Mokri Lug by the official censuses:

- 1921 - 1,563
- 1971 - 6,753
- 2002 - 6,376 (as part of Belgrade)

== Characteristics ==
Unlike majority of former suburbs and now neighborhoods on the outskirts of Belgrade, Veliki Mokri Lug kept mainly rural features, which resulted in population stagnation, while some neighboring settlements expanded significantly (Mali Mokri Lug, Kumodraž, Kaluđerica).

A motion for building the church in the neighborhood originated in 1988, and the construction began in 1990. The church was designed by architect Ljubiša Bošnjak. The lot on which it was built was donated by the emigrant Rajko Nikolić from Canada. It was consecrated in 1998 and dedicated to the Saint Hieromartyr Kyriaki, but remained unfinished. The founder, and the first elder of the church, Branko Kovačević (1930-2009) was buried in the churchyard. Some works were completed later, like the floor made of ceramic granite, but it remained unpainted and without iconostasis into the 2020s. With the help from the government and parishioners, the first altar painting was finished by 2022, representing Bogorodica Širšaja, or "Mother of God, Larger than Heavens".

== Cvetanova Ćuprija ==
Cvetanova Ćuprija (Serbian Cyrillic: Цветанова ћуприја) is a 3 kilometers long street which connects Veliki Mokri Lug and Medaković III and a sub-neighborhood of Veliki Mokri Lug developing around it. It goes through the entire western section of the neighborhood, but the term is mostly applied to the previously empty are along the street between Veliki Mokri Lug and Belgrade, which is becoming more and more urbaznied since the early 2000s.
