= Padina, Belgrade =

Padina Падина
- Urban neighbourhood
- Location within Belgrade
- Coordinates: 44°46′10″N 20°30′21″E
- Country: Serbia
- Region: Belgrade
- Municipality: Zvezdara

Population (2011)
  - Total: 6,998
- Time zone: UTC+1 (CET)
  - Summer (DST): UTC+2 (CEST)
- Area code: +381(0)11
- Car plates: BG

Padina (Serbian Cyrillic: Падина) is an urban neighborhood of Belgrade, the capital of Serbia. It is located in Belgrade's municipality of Zvezdara. After one of the central streets, it is also called Vojvoda Vlahović, but is also referred to as Braće Jerković II, because it makes urban connection to it. The neighborhood is sometimes also referred to as Medaković Padina (Serbian Cyrillic: Медаковић Падина, transl. Medaković Slope).

== Location ==
Padina is located in the south-western section of the municipality, right on the border of the municipality of Voždovac, on the northern slope of the 234-metre-tall (768 ft) hill of Mokroluško Brdo, thus the name (Serbian padina, slope). It borders the neighborhoods of Medaković III on the north, Braće Jerković on the west while on the south-east, through the street of Cvetanova Ćuprija, it extends to the neighborhood of Veliki Mokri Lug. On the south it makes one urban section with the neighborhood of Braće Jerković II (or Mitrovo Brdo), where it descends into the Kumodraž Field, in the valley of the Kumodraški Potok stream.

== Population ==
Padina mostly belongs to the local community (administrative sub-municipal unit) of Vojvoda Mišić, which was formed within the municipality of Zvezdara before the 1991 census. Prior to that, non-urbanized area belonged to Veliki Mokri Lug.

Local community had a population of 2,127 in 1991, 5,520 in 2002 and 6,998 in 2011. This local community includes also parts of the neighborhoods of Medaković 3 and Cvetanova Ćuprija, and in 2020 it was estimated that Zvezdara's part of Padina has 2,500 inhabitants.

However parts of the neighborhood spread outside of the local community, including parts of Veliki Mokri Lug, also in Zvezdara, and Mitrovo Brdo, in the municipality of Voždovac. By 2019, it was estimated that the entire neighborhood had a population of 10,000.

== Characteristics ==
The neighborhood originates from the late 1980s. It is a residential area on the edge of the city, spreading from the central street of the same name, Padina, which has been renamed to Veselina Čajkanovića Street in 2005. Until 2007, mostly individual houses were built, but since then numerous large villas and residential buildings were built on the hills in the outskirts of the neighborhood.

The neighborhood was regularly flooded during heavy rains. In 2018, the partial precipitation sewage system was built in the upper section of the neighborhood, but not in the lower parts, which continued to be flooded. Detailed regulatory plan for the settlement was drafted in 2005, but almost nothing was done of planned projects. All projects, including the full sewage system, are stopped due to the ownership issues and illegally built houses and other structures. By 2021, the neighborhood was still expanding along the upper hills.

Elementary school should be built in the neighborhood in 2022.
