= Autokomanda =

Autokomanda Аутокоманда
- Urban neighbourhood
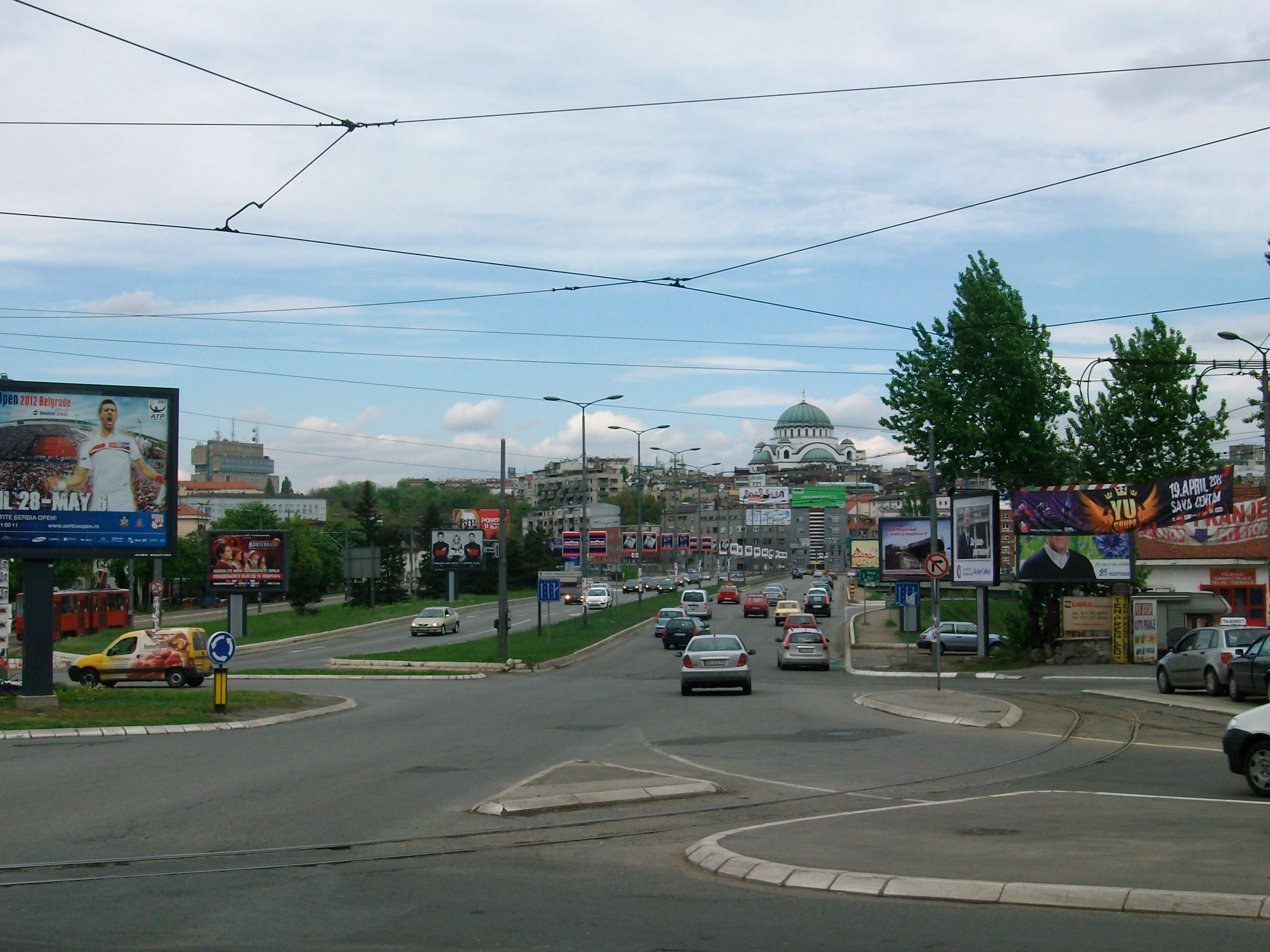
- Autokomanda
- Interactive map of Autokomanda
- Location within Belgrade
- Coordinates: 44°47′25″N 20°28′05″E
- Country: Serbia
- Region: Belgrade
- Municipality: Voždovac
- Time zone: UTC+1 (CET)
  - Summer (DST): UTC+2 (CEST)
- Area code: +381(0)11
- Car plates: BG

Autokomanda (Serbian Cyrillic: Аутокоманда, pronounced [autɔ̝kɔ̝̌maːnda]) is an urban neighborhood of Belgrade, the capital of Serbia. It is located on the tripoint of the Belgrade municipalities of Voždovac, Savski Venac and Vračar.

== Location ==
Autokomanda is located about 1.5 kilometers south of downtown Belgrade. It borders the neighborhoods of Neimar and Karađorđev Park to the north, Dušanovac to the east, Voždovac to the south and Stadion and Dedinje to the west.

== History ==
The remains belonging to the Scordisci, a Celtic tribe which founded Singidunum, the predecessor of Belgrade, were found in Autokomanda.

In the Interbellum, Autokomanda was the location of the motorized units of the Royal Yugoslav Army, which is how it got its name. The section where the artillery was based was called Topovske Šupe and in the early days of the German occupation, it was turned by the Nazis into the concentration camp. From August to October 1941 over 5,000 Jews and Romanis from Belgrade and the Banat passed through the camp, where they were gathered and sent to the mass executions in Kumodraž, Bežanija, Jajinci and Staro Sajmište concentration camp.

== Interchange ==
Autokomanda map

The main feature in the neighborhood is a major looped interchange, one of two in the old part of Belgrade (the other one being in Mostar). It is located on the Highway Belgrade–Niš, constructed right through the urban tissue, which is still an issue of debate even today, even though the road was originally intended as a fast, intercity Bežanija-Autokomanda freeway. Construction began in 1967 and was completed by 1974. A curiosity is that it is one of the very few interchanges in the downtown of the city.

A bitter dispute between the mayor of Belgrade, Nenad Bogdanović and a group of architects from the previous city's establishment (including the construction of Mostar and Autokomanda) resulted in the mayor's description of the interchanges from October 2006: 'Those are the two worst interchanges and the only ones in the world with traffic lights... people who made those are today criticizing us.' The other side replied that under the original plans, Autokomanda was to be the location of a new main railway station for Belgrade, thus some sections were constructed only as temporary ones. The main objection was that even though it is on the highway it had no connections to it on the right side. However, the railway station project was moved to Prokop so the temporary solution remained until September–November 2007 when the right side ramp was finally finished, over 30 years after the construction of the interchange.

In September 2006 a major reconstruction of the interchange began, with complete renovation and fixing of all 12 bridges (loops) that the interchange has. The importance of Autokomanda for city transportation became very visible as, even though it was closed for traffic only partially, it disrupted the normal flow of traffic in the entire city causing traffic jams all over. Works were completed in spring 2007.

== Characteristics ==
In the Voždovac section of the neighborhood, large hangars of the former motorized forces command are located. This is how the neighborhood got its name (Serbian, auto-komanda). The facilities have not been used for their initial purpose for a long time, but they have been renovated recently. The area is mostly commercial, with a section of a railway passing nearby and a developing commercial section along the 'Trg Oslobođenja' (Square of the Liberation) and 'Bulevar Oslobođenja' (Boulevard of the Liberation). The stadiums of soccer teams Partizan and Crvena zvezda (Rajko Mitić Stadium) are located nearby. The population of Autokomanda (including the sub-neighborhood of Stadion), was 12,167 in 2002.

To the west Autokomanda continues into the Belgrade-Niš highway and to the east to Mostarska Petlja, Novi Beograd and further to the Belgrade-Zagreb highway (over the Gazela bridge).

A bronze monument to the French general, Louis Franchet d'Espérey, who commanded on the Salonica front in the Serbian Campaign of the World War I in 1918, was erected in 1936 (sculptor Risto Stijović). The section of the highway from Mostar to Autokomanda is officially named the Boulevard of Louis Franchet d'Espérey.

== Projects ==
=== Bus Station South ===
Belgrade's General Urban Plan (GUP) in 1971, envisioned three new bus stations. They were to take over the lines from the city's main bus station (BAS) in downtown, which was to be closed. They were to be called BAS West, in New Belgrade, BAS North in Viline Vode, near the Pančevo Bridge while the BAS South would be in Autokomanda. Revised GUP in 1985 still predicted all three stations, but none was constructed. Next revision of GUP in 2003 excluded BAS South and North, keeping only BAS West, which was to become the city's central bus station.

=== Delta Planet Shopping Center ===
In 2005, Miroslav Mišković, a tycoon, one of the richest Serbs and owner of Delta Holding, purchased the lot where the station was planned. He announced plans to build a massive Delta Planet Shopping Center and two 40-floor business towers. It was widely commented at the time that city government deliberately scrapped the station project in order to allow Mišković to obtain the land.

In 2007, with the new regulatory plans, the city reduced allowed height in the area to 20 floors, considering the planned object "too big and unmeasured". It was also explained that the location was not good for the bus station anyway as the approach from the opposite direction of the highway would make a problem. In the bidding for the adjoining lot, Mišković lost to Petar Matić and his MPC Properties in 2008. In 2010 Matić returned the land to the city. Part of this land was purchased by Mišković in 2011. He also acquired the "Autokomanda" company in 2015 and the remaining city owned parcel in April 2019. With this, he became the sole proprietor of this part of Autokomanda, holding a 3.3 ha (8.2 acres) of land. On the newly acquired lots he will be allowed to construct a 22 m (72 ft) tall building and a 75 m (246 ft) tall business tower. As of April 2019, none of the works regarding building of the shopping mall or the surrounding commercial complex began.

In March 2021, city and Delta Holding announced that the concept for the former concentration camp and the surrounding area was changed. The remaining objects in Topovske Šupe will be fully renovated and the memorial complex will be formed. Instead of mega shopping mall next to it, Delta Holding will build an urban business district, with commercial, business and residential sections with lots of green areas.
