= Pavle Medaković =

Serbian conductor (born 1953)

Pavle Medaković (born 1953) is a Serbian conductor.

== Education ==
He was born in Belgrade, in Yugoslavia at the time. He earned a conducting degree at the Faculty of Music in Belgrade in 1977, and completed further studies in 1982 at the University of Music and Performing Arts Vienna where he studied under Professor Karl Österreicher. He earned a Masters in Music degree at the Belgrade Faculty of Music in 1990. He received advanced training at master classes with Professor Pierre Dervaux (1980) and Sergiu Celibidache (1981).

== Career ==
While studying he worked as a conductor of the Branko Krsmanovich chorus and won two first prizes at the Belgrade Chorus Festival in 1976. The same year he became the principal conductor of the Belgrade Chamber Opera. He performed operas by composers including V. Fioravanti, D. Cimarosa, G. C. Menotti, G. Rossini, L. Chailly, G. Bizet, and D. Radich. With the same ensemble he conducted at the Fourth International Festival of Modern Chamber Music (1980) in Udine.

He performed with the Belgrade Philharmonic, Serbian Radio-Television Symphony Orchestra, Macedonian Philharmonic, Nis Symphony Orchestra, Seville Symphony Orchestra (Spain), Polish National Radio Symphony Orchestra (Poland), Burgas Symphony Orchestra and Ruse Symphony Orchestra (Bulgaria), and Dresden Philharmonic (Germany).

For two years he was artistic director of Franco -Yugoslav Musical Week (1981 and 1982), as a conductor of the Symphony Orchestra. After his successful concert with the Ignaz Paderewsky Philharmonic Orchestra (Pomeranian Philharmonic) in Poland (1988), he became their permanent guest conductor until 2006. For two years (1996 and 1997) he worked as conductor at the Summer Academy of Sacred Music in Studenica Monastery (Serbia). Medakovich was artistic director and the first conductor of the Symphony Orchestra in Mostar (Bosnia-Herzegovina) from 1983 to 1985. From 1986 to 1988, he was the conductor of Abrashevich chorus in Belgrade. In 1988 Medakovich became principal conductor and artistic director of the Stanislav Binicki Symphony Orchestra, Belgrade. In 2000 he was Director of [Belgrade Philharmonic Orchestra]He is a professor of orchestral training at the Academy for Beauty Arts in Belgrade.

Medakovich has conducted more than 1200 concerts of symphonic and choral music. His repertoire encompasses music from classic to contemporary composers. Having in mind the repertoire, He has successfully collaborated with many artists, including Vadim Brodski Nikolai Demidienko, Pavlina Dokovska, Maria Baranowska, Georgios Demertzis, Neal Larrabee, Massimo Giorgi, Micho Dimitrov, Andrei Nikolsky, Boris Pamukdžijev, Ivan Zenati, Konstantin Bogino, Igor Lazko, Vladimir Krpan Jovan Kolundžija, Ksenija Janković, Sreten Krstic, Natasa Veljkovic, Stefan Milenković, Jasminka Stancul, Rita Kinka, Aleksandar Madžar, Darko Veličkovski, Dejan Bravnitschar, Radmila Bakočevich, Radmila Smiljanic, Ruža Pospiš Baldani, Vladimir Ruzdjak, Gertruda Munitich, Jadranka Jovanovic, Milena Kitic, Irena Zaric, Boris Trajanov, Gordana Jevtovich, Dunja Simich, Jovo Reljin, Slobodan Stankovich, Dubravka Zubovich, Nikola Mitich, Oliver Njego, Ištvan Varga, Ivan Dinich, Aleksandar Sandorov, Dejan Sinadinovich, Dubravka Jovičich, Maja Jokanovich, Ilija Marinkovich, Nemanja Radulovich, Nenad Lečich, Ognjen Popovich, Lidija Bizjak, and Sanja Bizjak.

On 14 November 2016 Medakovich celebrated 40 years of artistic work at Ilija M. Kolarac Endowment.
