= Mostar interchange =

Mostar interchange Мостарска петља
- Urban neighbourhood
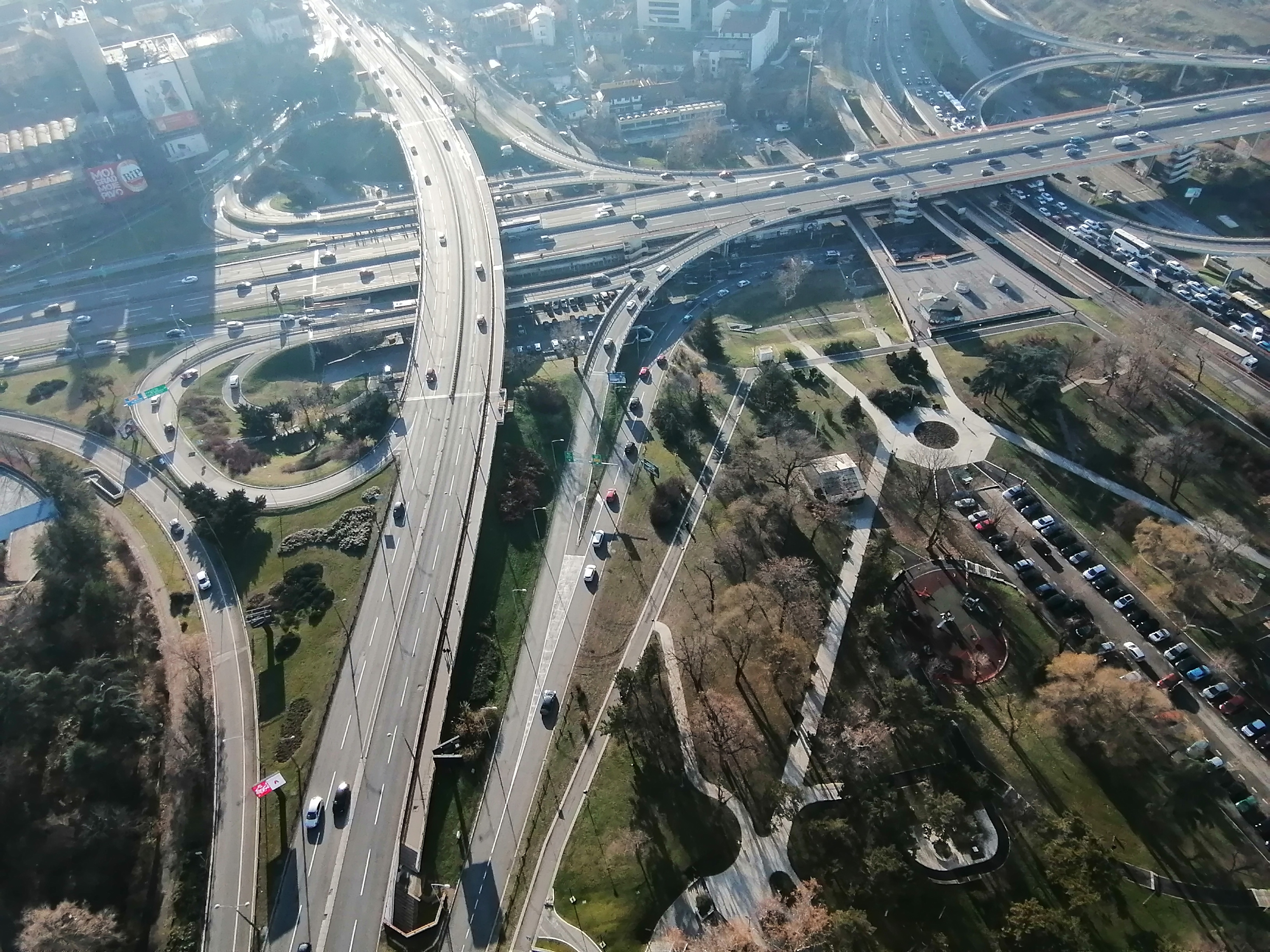
- Eastern half of the Mostar interchange

- Location within Belgrade
- Coordinates: 44°47′55″N 20°26′51″E
- Country: Serbia
- Region: Belgrade
- Municipality: Savski Venac
- Time zone: UTC+1 (CET)
  - Summer (DST): UTC+2 (CEST)
- Area code: +381(0)11
- Car plates: BG

Mostar interchange (Serbian: Мостарска петља, romanized: Mostarska petlja) or colloquially Mostar (Serbian: Мостар, romanized: Mostar) is a major interchange and a surrounding urban neighborhood of Belgrade, the capital of Serbia. It is located in Belgrade's municipality of Savski Venac.

== Interchange ==
The Mostar looped interchange was constructed in 1974, as one of two major ones (the other one being Autokomanda) on the highway Belgrade–Niš. The highway runs right through the urban centre of Belgrade, which is still an issue of debate even though the road was originally intended as a fast, intercity Bežanija-Autokomanda freeway. The interchange itself was built on the location of the old neighbourhood of Jatagan Mala.

There were two projects for the interchange. One design, by the architects Branislav Jovin and Jovan Katanić, was 10 times more expensive than the other one. Still, after bitter disputes, the mayor of Belgrade Branko Pešić decided in 1967 to go with the expensive project, noting to Jovin and Katanić: "They should prepare three light poles on Guberevac for the three of us if this interchange doesn't turn out right" (note: Guberavac hill is the location of the Laza Lazarević clinic, "lunatic" asylum).

However, that left not enough money for the highway through the city as Pešić wanted it to be "wider than those in Zagreb or Ljubljana". Slovene Edvard Kardelj who was to allow the spending of the money from the federal funds did not approve the additional funding for the highway. Pešić pushed the project nevertheless and by 1970 the highway was operational. As of 2017, it is not known from where Pešić acquired the necessary funds.

Some technical specifications of the interchange include:

- It covers an area of 20,000 m^{2} (220,000 sq ft)
- It has an elevation of 22 m (72 ft)
- It's crossed by double tram tracks
- It has 6 underground pedestrian passages and 4 passarellas, leading to 4 bus and 2 tram stops
- A curiosity factor is that it is one of the very few interchanges downtown.

Due to its construction, Mostar incidentally serves as a water collector so during the major rains it gets regularly flooded by the pond created by the rainwater. In September 2017, Goran Rodić, the vice president of the Serbian Chamber of Construction, stated that if the water pumps should be turned off, the Mostar would be completely flooded in 48 hours.

In 2023 lowest levels of the interchange were partially expanded in order to make a connection to the Belgrade Waterfront's main thoroughfare Woodrow Wilson Boulevard, and to the future Boiler House complex.

== Neighborhood ==
Mostar interchange map (eastern half)

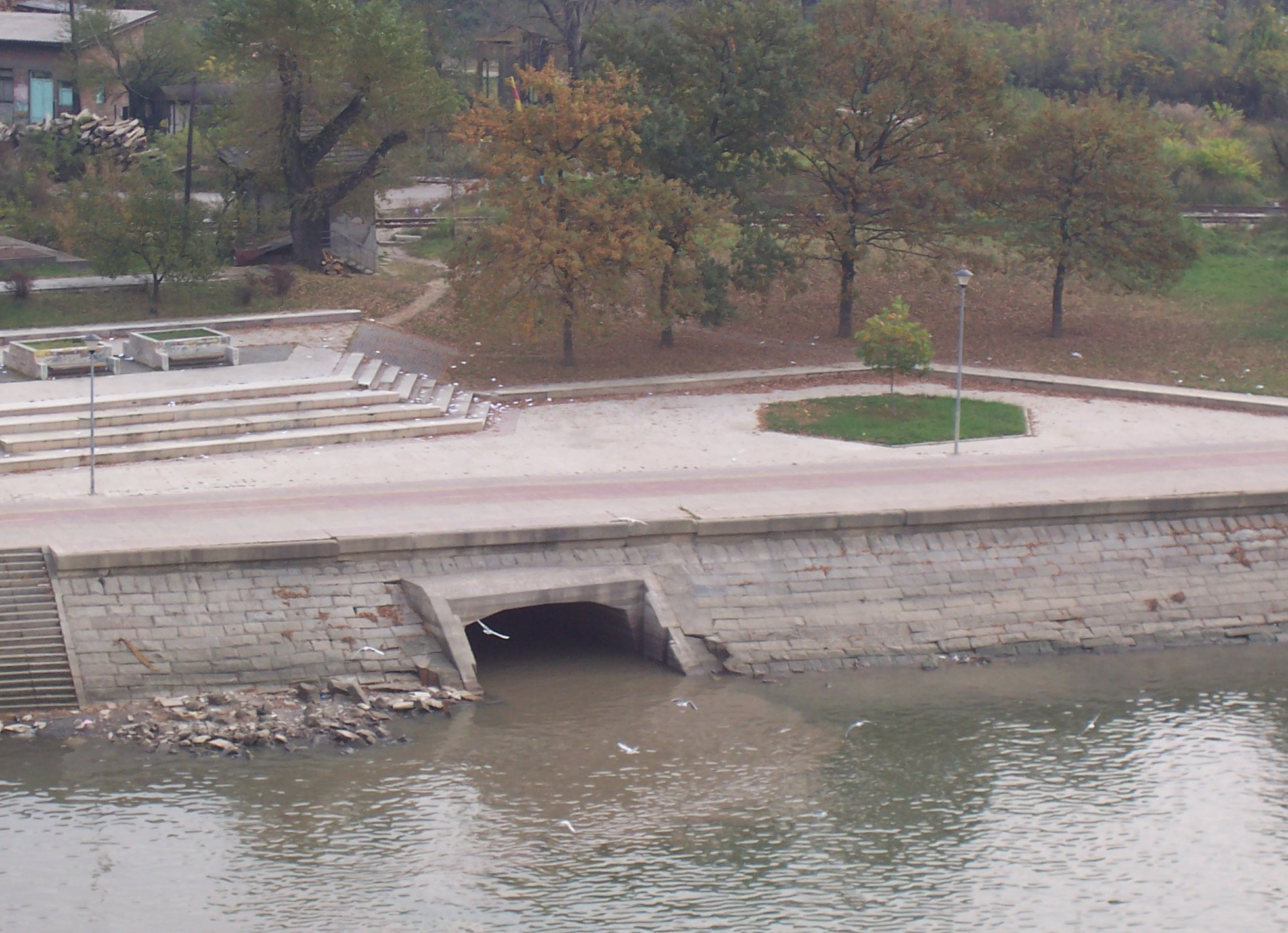
Channeled mouth of Mokroluški potok, under the Gazela bridge

The immediate surrounding neighborhood is almost entirely non-residential. The northern side is occupied by the buildings of the Ministry of the Interior (destroyed in the 1999 NATO bombing of Serbia) and the Clinical Centre, which is the largest clinical complex in Belgrade. The southern side comprises the 'BIP' brewery, the Belgrade Centre railway station in Prokop, a series of half-ruined storages and former factories and the facilities of the Belgrade Fair. In south it borders the neighborhood of Senjak. To the west it continues into the Belgrade-Niš highway and to the east to the Novi Beograd and further to Belgrade-Zagreb highway (over the Gazela bridge).

In the mid-19th century, northern part of modern Senjak was a meadow, with only the Topčider road passing through. It was used as the training ground for the army and as the pasture for the sheep. The northern slope, above the left bank of the Mokroluški Creek was known as Zamastir. Czech émigré Heinrich Smutek, who owned a kafana, arranged a large estate (with a bricklayer), and a garden in the area. Zamastir then became known as Smutekovac, after the kafana's name. It became an excursion site for the Belgraders, which originally came by fiacres and later by the tram "Topčiderac", which connected the downtown with Topčider. In the 1870s the area was parceled and Đorđe Vajfert purchased the land from the lawyer Pera Marković. As he was a German subject, he couldn't own properties in Serbia. Instead he paid the entire sum to Marković who issued him a receipt.

Vajfert then started to build the brewery, predecessor of the modern BIP brewery at the same location. As soon as he was granted Serbian citizenship, Vajfert received a deed on the land. Designed by the foreign architects, the "Đorđe Vajfert's First Serbian Steam Brewery" was finished in 1873, while the entire brewery complex was finished in 1880. In 1892–1893, within the complex, Vajfert built a mansion which became known as Vajfert's Villa. The one-storey edifice was designed by engineer Jovan K. Ristić, in the Romanticist style. It became known for its interior, richly decorated woodworks, including the central wooden staircase. Close to the villa is the vast network of lagums, or underground corridors. The so-called Vajfert's storage cellars, the 70 m (230 ft) long and 32 m (105 ft) wide subterranean rooms were divided in 14 sections where beer was stocked in barrels and tanks.

The villa became one of the most distinguished venue in Belgrade hosting numerous balls and receptions. Vajfert turned the surrounding estate into an exquisite garden, which hosted many banquets and parties. In 1892, city authorities organized a banquet with Nikola Tesla as the guest of honor. The Mostar area was also referred to as Vajfertovac at the time.

Kafana "Mostar", which was established in the vicinity gave name to the entire neighborhood. The venue, originally named Tri ključa, was itself named after the small bridge (most) across the Mokroluški potok, which is today conducted into the underground sewage system, but its channeled mouth into the Sava river is still visible under the Gazela bridge. The wooden bridge was regularly destroyed during the seasonal floods caused by the Mokroluški potok. The street which was the extension of the Topčider road, later renamed Miloša Velikog, was named Vajfert boulevard until 1930 when was renamed to the Vojvoda Putnik boulevard. The connecting point of two streets, where the interchange is today, was known as the Square of the Defenders of Belgrade.

After World War II the brewery was modernized and expanded, and the only surviving part of the original complex was the Vajfert's Villa. In the early 2019 city announced new detailed regulatory plan (PDR) for the area where the brewery is, envisioning the conversion of the land from "economic" to "commercial". By the 2010s, the brewery complex dilapidated and partially went out of use, reducing the factory's capacity. The lagums haven't been inspected for a long time while the terrain is prone to the mass wasting. In 2009 the partial supporting wall was built to prevent the soil from moving while the unbuilt part of the complex became covered in overgrowth.

In November 2019 city published its PDR for the area, work of urbanists Radmila Grubišić and Milica Andrejić. It envisions the complete demolition of the entire complex and construction of the commercial neighborhood with hotels, business offices and malls. The only surviving part of the former complex will again be the Vajfert's Villa, which was placed under the preliminary protection. A small beer production in some of the new objects may be preserved for the touristic purposes. After the BIP brewery was sold in August 2021, the new owners announced that the brewery complex will be turned into the "most modern business park in Europe.

On the eastern side of the interchange, across the brewery, the facilities of the Belgrade City Ambulance are located. The building and the garages predate the interchange, as they were built in 1960. In January 2019 it was announced that the ambulance building will be renovated and enlarged with additional 8,000 m^{2} (86,000 sq ft) of floor space.

== Features ==
=== Old Mill ===
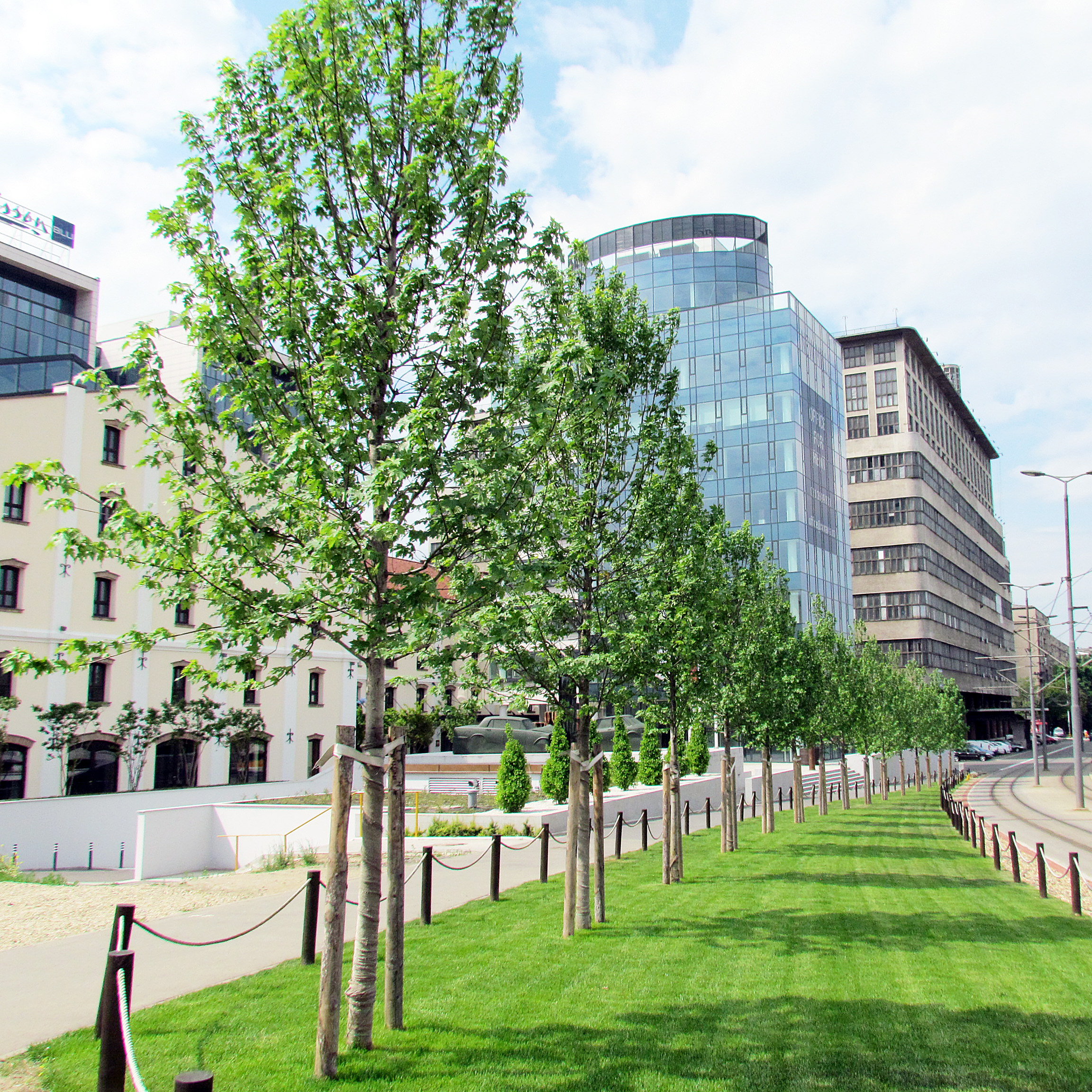
Radisson Blue Old Mill Hotel, on the left

In 1901 the "First joint stock company bread producing association for food processing" was formed as the first such organization in Serbia. In 1902 they built the steam operated mill, today located just south of the interchange. Apart from having the latest gas equipment at the time, it also possessed the dynamo machine and was the first mill in Serbia completely powered by the electricity in 1912. During Interbellum, it developed into one of the most important and largest mills in Yugoslavia. It was operated by the Vračar Cooperative, in the majority ownership of Bogdan Veljković. In 1945 the state confiscated properties of the Veljković family, including land, mill and 17 other objects.

In time, the mill was closed and became known as the Stari mlin ("Old Mill"). It was declared a cultural monument in 1987, but was left unattended and deteriorated a lot, especially after 1994 when it was additionally ruined by fire of dubious origin, basically with only the frame of the construction and outer façade remaining. In 1995 Savski Venac municipality gave the lot to the Koling company, in exchange for 800 m^{2} (8,600 sq ft) of commercial venues. Koling developed a project "Old Mill Complex" which city assembly accepted in 2007. Koling then sold the project to the Austrian company Soravia. Soravia obtained necessary permits in 2009 and the construction commenced in 2011. It was then announced that works will be finished by 2013, but the construction dragged on, which Soravia justified with the financial problems (the investment was 55 million euros). However, it was reported that Soravia is probably trying to change the interior layout, as it wasn't allowed to change the outer frame, in an effort to achieve a star more for the hotel. The project included the adaptation of the mill into the hotel, with 25,000 m^{2} (270,000 sq ft), and construction of three buildings around it: an 11-storey business tower with the total floor area of 3,900 m^{2} (42,000 sq ft) between the mill and the BIGZ building, and the two hotel towers behind the mill. As the object is under the state protection, experts from the Institute for the protection of the cultural monuments were present at the construction site. The remnants of the mill were basically deconstructed, brick by brick, which were then reused as the original look of the façade had to be preserved. The tall industrial chimney is also kept. On 10 December 2014 the Radisson Blu Old Mill hotel was officially open. The hotel has 4 stars, 236 rooms and apartments, 4 conference rooms and 150 parking spots in an underground garage. The Veljković family is still claiming the property and trying to restore the ownership through the ongoing process of restoration. They also claim that the entire process by which the mill ended as the hotel (municipality Savski Venac-Koling-Soravia) is irregular and corruptive as the location was sold for much less than its real value was at the time, especially since the lot (80 a (86,000 sq ft)) is on a very attractive location.

=== Park ===
Park Gazela (after the bridge) or Tri Ključa ("Three keys") is located in the northeast extension of the interchange. It is cascade shaped, bounded by Mostar and the streets of Sarajevska, Kneza Miloša and Drinska. It covers 20.450 m^{2} (220.12 sq ft). Originally, the kafana "Tri zlatna ključa" ("three golden keys") was located here, along the Topčider Road, in the 19th century. Soon, the entire neighborhood became known as Tri Ključa ("three keys") The name of the kafana was then changed to "Kod pocepanih gaća" ("Chez torn nickers"). When Queen Draga was passing by in her carriage, she noted the shameless name and asked for its change. The venue was then renamed to "Tri Ključa".

A reconstruction, part of the Skyline Belgrade project, is scheduled for April 2018. The park will keep the memorial drinking fountain and the new pedestrian and bicycle paths will be built, so as a footbridge in the direction of Topčidersko Brdo. The reconstruction began in 2021. The reconstructed area covered some 60% of the total green area, and the park was divided in several sections - sports fields (basketball, outdoor gym), proper park area, dog park, kids playground, etc. The entire park is encircled by the pedestrian pathway. During the reconstruction, it was announced that the official name of the park is "Lep izgled", or "pretty looks", also after one of the former kafanas. The renovation was finished in April 2022.
