= Mia Medaković-Topalović =

Serbian photographer (born 1974)

- Миа Медаковић-Топаловић
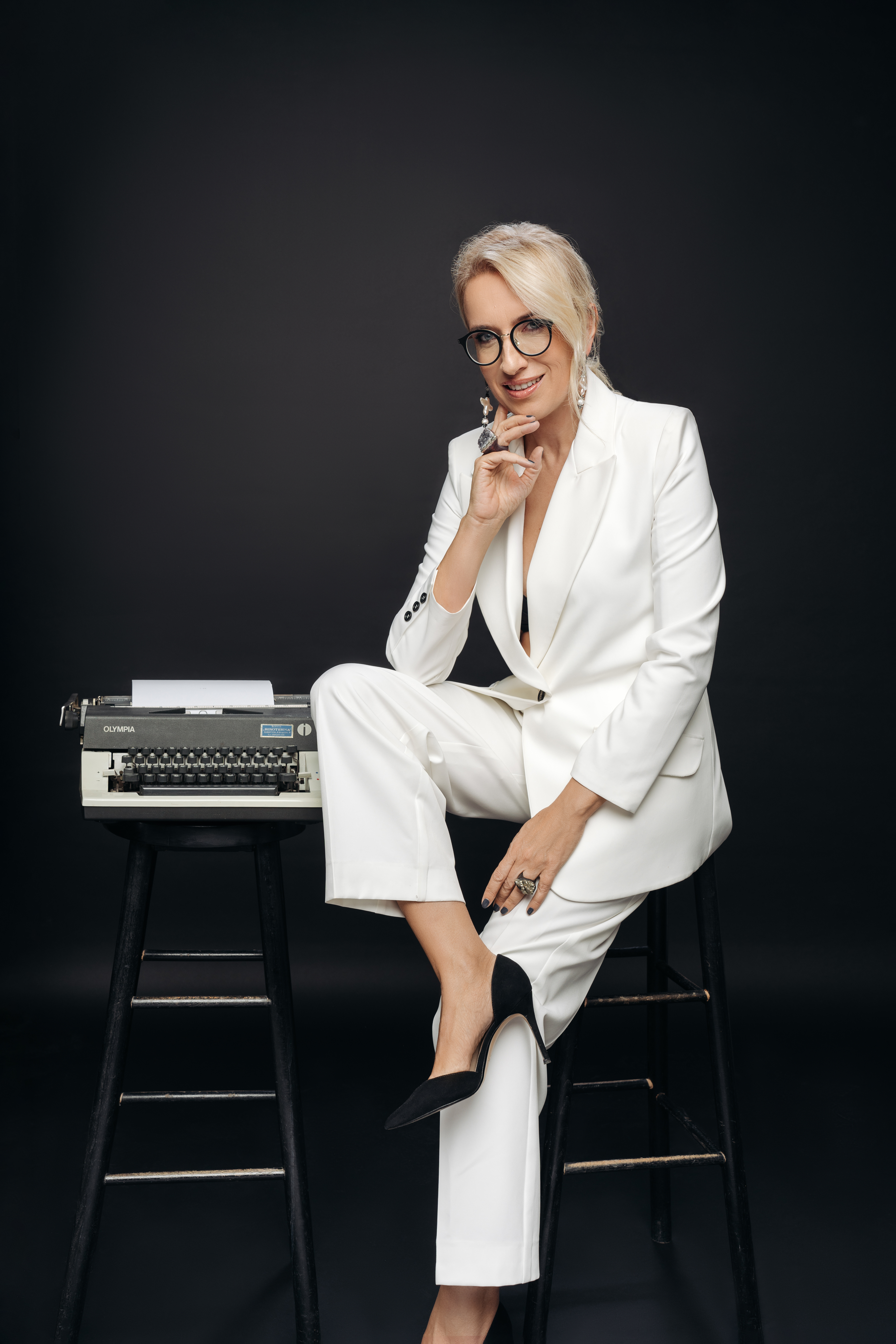
- Mia in 2025
- Born: January 26, 1974 (age 52); Subotica, PR Serbia, FPR Yugoslavia
- Education: University of Novi Sad Faculty of Law; University of Florence
- Occupations: Businesswoman, attorney, journalist, photographer
- Years active: 2000—

Mia Medaković-Topalović (Serbian Cyrillic: Миа Медаковић Топаловић; Born in Subotica, Serbia January 26, 1974), is a Serbian attorney, journalist, and photographer. She founded an online magazine, Refresh Your Life.

== Life and education ==
Mia was born and raised in Subotica, Serbia. She completed her law degree at the Law school in Novi Sad, and as a fellow of the Ministry of Foreign Affairs in Italy, she completed a research project entitled ″Trgovina Ljudima u Srbiji i Italiji″ (trans. Human Trafficking in Serbia and Italy) under the mentorship of Professor of Criminal Law Mikel Papa of the Law School at the University of Florence (Firenze). The same year (2009) she defended her thesis "Trgovina Ljudima: Instrumenti Kontrole u Srbiji i Italiji” (trans. Human Trafficking: Instruments of Control in Serbia and Italy). Upon completion of these requirements, she was honored with the title of “graduated attorney” (Laurea Magistrale) in Italy.

== Journalism and RYL Magazine ==
Mia is the founder and editor in chief of the online magazine Refresh Your Life (RYL) which had naturally found its way into her life in February 2015 when the first volume was published. It is a magazine that focuses on lifestyle and mindstyle of modern women and men who are on a journey toward personal growth and development. RYL is a mix of spirituality, art, culture, beauty, fashion, business and personal development. Her passion for mankind and beauty were her primary inspiration in starting an online magazine attracting readers for its content, minimalism, and excellent photography.

== Solo exhibits ==
- 2017 - Photography project "Varvarogenius, The Face of Balkan Intellectuals", was exhibited in Belgrade, Subotica, Sarajevo, and Pula. That project involved photographing twenty-three men from Belgrade, Ljubljana, Skopje, Sarajevo, Novi Sad, Zagreb, Tivat, Porto Montenegro, and Rovinj.
- 2019 - Another photography project, "The Key to the World", was exhibited in Belgrade and Subotica.
- 2021 - Project "Blue", was also exhibited in Belgrade.
- 2024 – "My film" is a collection of scenes taken from various films depicting stories between reality and non-reality. It is about her way of seeing life in Berlin, Jordan, Tunis, Amsterdam, Georgia, Turkey, and Serbia.

== Gallery ==

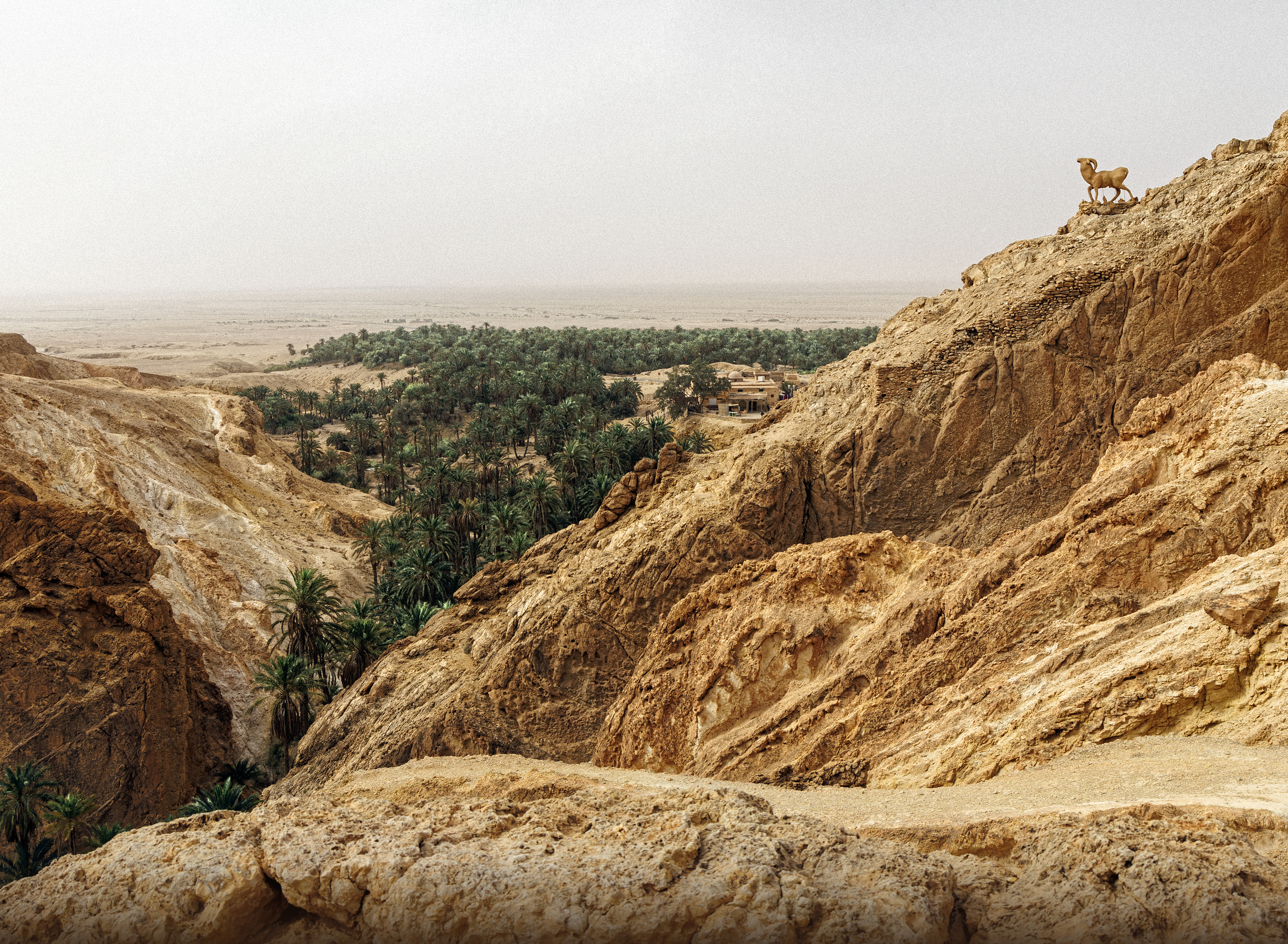

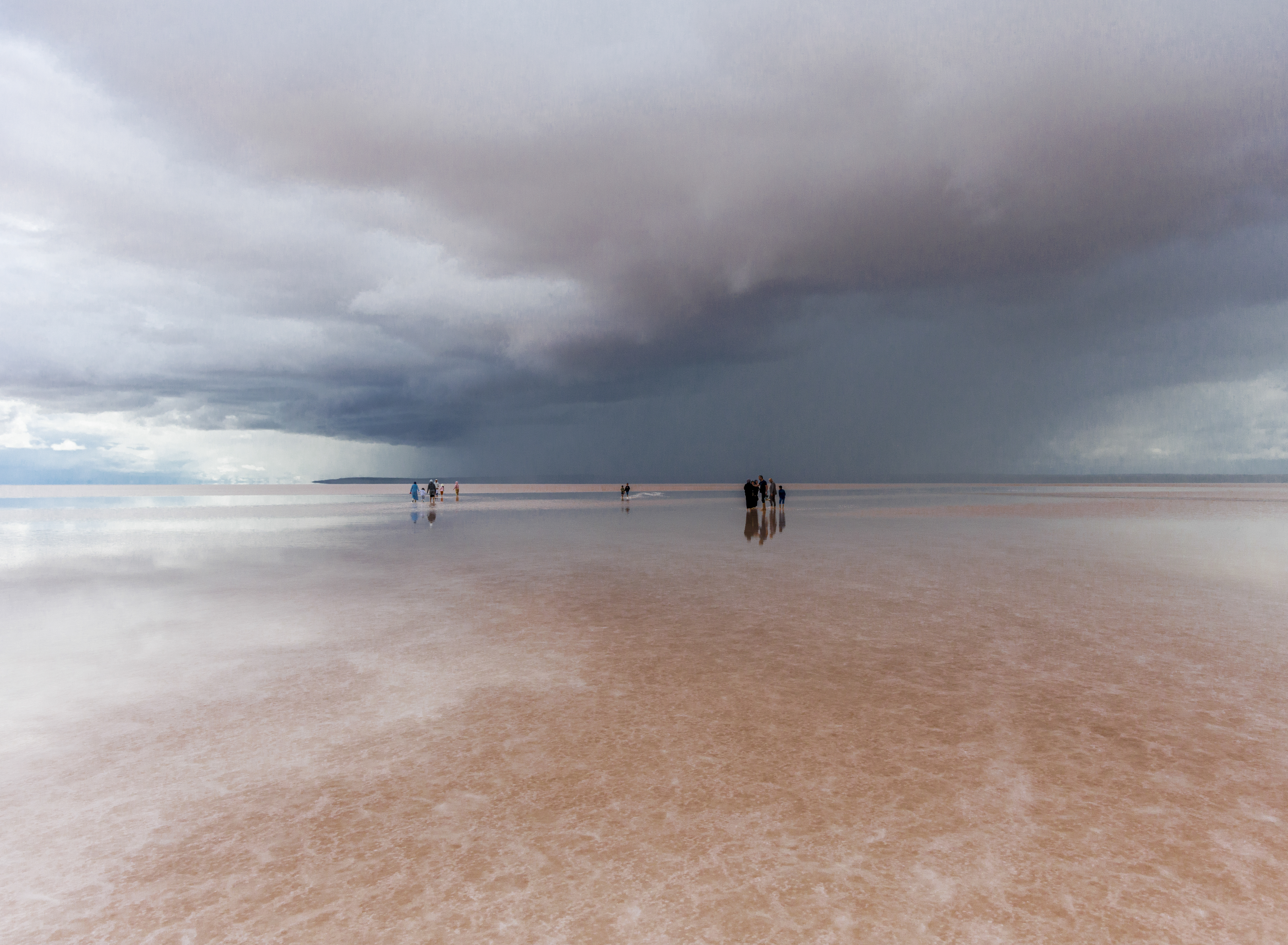

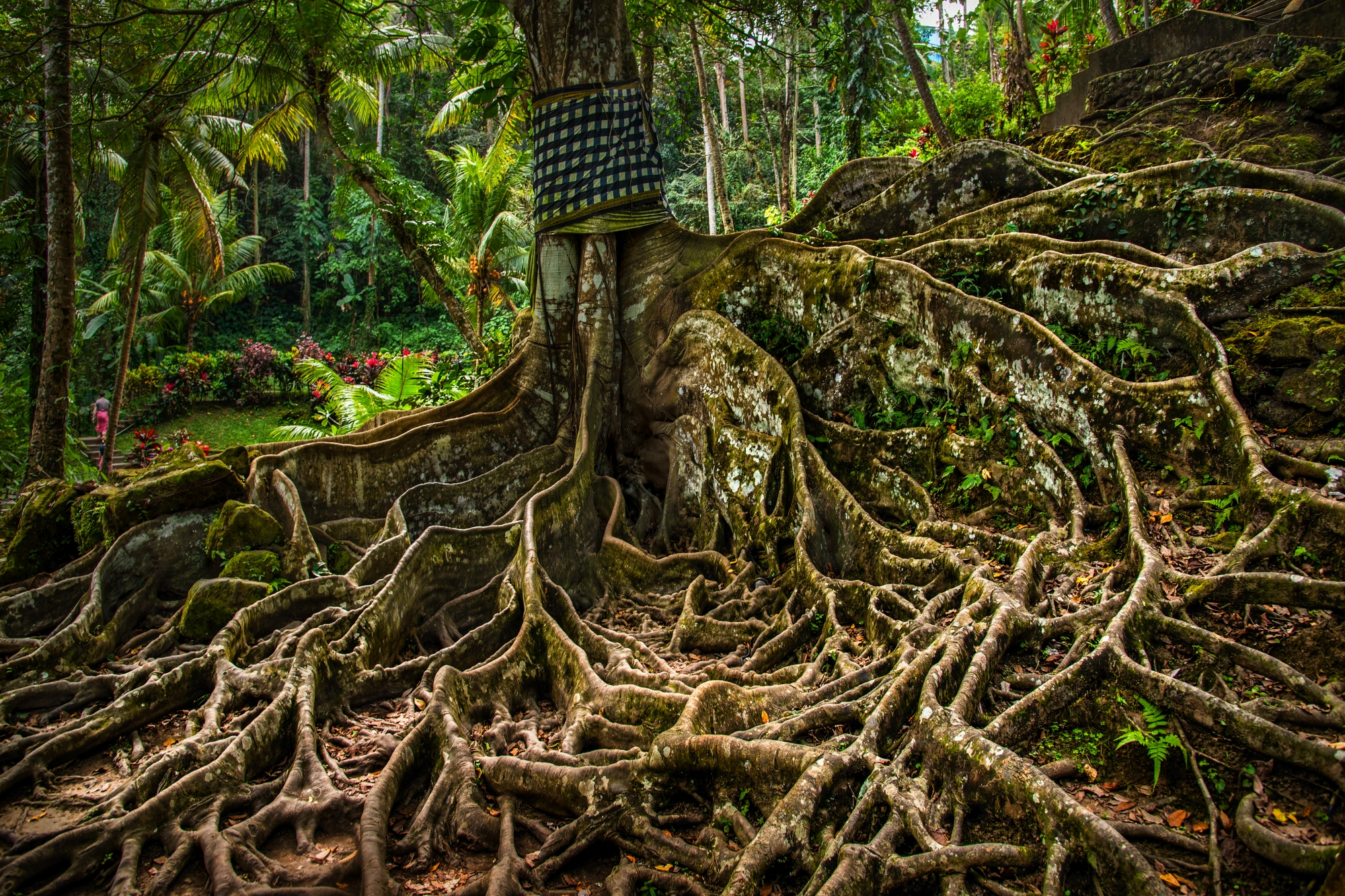
