= Medaković =

Medaković may refer to:

- Medaković, Belgrade, an urban neighborhood of the capital city of Serbia
  - Medaković I
  - Medaković II
  - Medaković III
- Medaković (surname), a Serbian surname
  - Bogdan Medaković, Austro-Hungarian lawyer and politician
  - Danilo Medaković (1819–1881), Serbian writer and newspaper publisher
  - Dejan Medaković (1922–2008), Serbian art historian, writer and academician
  - Mia Medaković-Topalović
  - Mirna Medaković, Croatian actress
  - Pavle Medaković (born 1953), Serbian conductor
  - Vera Veljkov-Medaković

== See also ==
- Medaković Padina, an urban neighborhood of Belgrade, Serbia
