= Belgrade pagoda =

Buddhist temple in Belgrade, Serbia

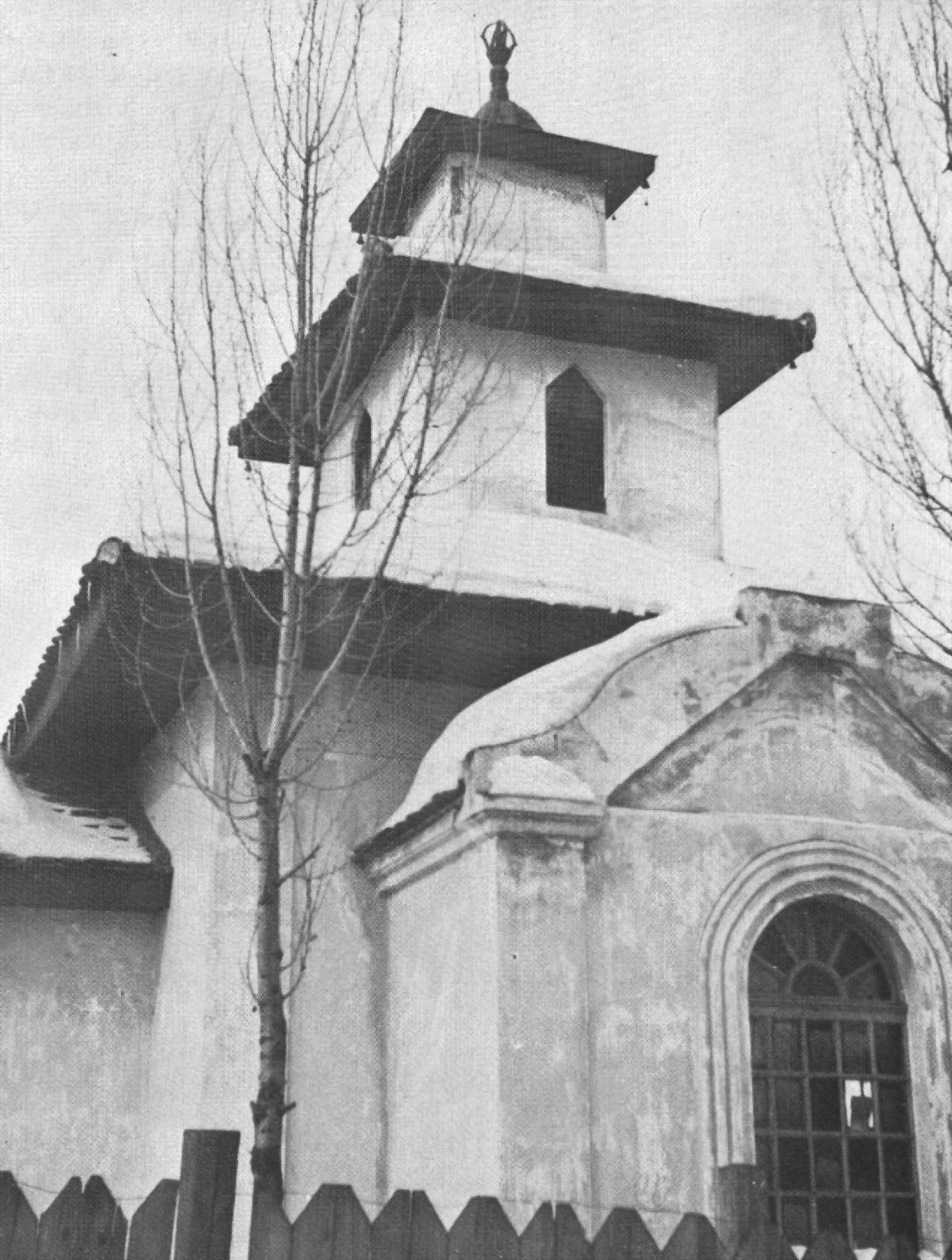

Religion
- Affiliation: Tibetan Buddhism
- Sect: Gelugpa

Location
- Municipality: Zvezdara, Belgrade
- Country: Serbia
- Interactive map of Belgrade pagoda
- Coordinates: 44.786°N 20.511°E

Architecture
- Completed: 1929
- Demolished: mid-1960s

Kalmyk Buddhist Temple, also known as Kalmyk Home, was a Buddhist temple in Belgrade, capital of Serbia. It was built in 1929 as one of the first Buddhist temples in Europe, served religious purposes until 1944, and was completely demolished in the mid-1960s.

== Location ==
The Pagoda was located in the neighborhood known today as Učiteljsko Naselje, in Zvezdara municipality. Učiteljsko Naselje is a section of the larger Konjarnik neighborhood. The street in which it was based was named Budistička (Buddhist) after the temple was built, and today is named Budvanska (Budva street).

== Origin of the pagoda ==
After the October Revolution in 1917, a huge number of people from Russia, supporters of the White movement, emigrated to Yugoslavia, including Pyotr Wrangel, general of the White Army. Among them were hundreds of Kalmyks, Western Mongolian people of Buddhist faith, who inhabited the shores of the Caspian Sea. From April 1920 to late 1923, some 500 Kalmyks entered Serbia, and 400 of them settled in Belgrade, thus creating the largest Kalmyk colony in Europe.

They settled on the eastern outskirts of Belgrade: Karaburma, Bulbulder, Cvetkova Pijaca, Crveni Krst. However, the majority of them settled in Mali Mokri Lug, the suburban village of Belgrade at the time. Having several priests in their community, already in 1923 they rented rooms in the still existing house in the Vojislava Ilića street No 47 for religious service. In 1925 they moved it to Metohijska street No 51 and started an action for building a proper temple. The Kalmyks were headed by the former colonel of the Russian Imperial Army, Abusha Alekseyev (1886–1938) and the Buddhist elder Manchuda Borinov (1872–1928). They officially formed their Belgrade organization in April 1929, and Alekseyev was elected as the chief.

Many Kalmyks worked in the brickworks owned by the industrialist Miloš Jaćimović (1858–1940), and soon he became a major benefactor of their community. In 1928 he donated the lot on which the temple was built and also provided the building materials, bricks and roof tiles. That same year, Kalmyks were granted permission to build the temple, given to them by both the political and Serbian Orthodox Church authorities. King Alexander I of Yugoslavia also helped them financially.

The temple was consecrated on 12 December 1929. The guests included members of the Kalmyk diaspora in Czechoslovakia and France, so as the representatives of the Russian organizations in Belgrade, including the atamans of the Don Cossacks and the Terek Cossacks, as the Kalmyks in the Russian Empire mostly served in the army horse units. The temple soon became an attraction, being listed in tourist guides, and the street in which it was built was officially named "Buddhist" street. The city government became a financial supporter of the temple, so it was reconstructed and expanded in 1935. The main wall was decorated with two painted deer. Being so far away from Buddhist countries, the temple lacked lots of artifacts needed for the religious service. Through the contacts with the Japanese envoy to Bucharest, in the neighboring Romania, a large bronze statue of Buddha arrived from Tokyo and was consecrated on 25 March 1934. With the Buddha statue, additional religious equipment arrived (drums, gongs, etc.), but the shipment was kept at the Customs Office, which asked for a huge amount of money to be paid by the Kalmyks. The Ministry of Justice intervened and the Buddhist shipment was declared customs free.

== Kalmyks in Belgrade ==
Within the temple, Kalmyks established a Buddhist Spiritual Council, which was a focal point of all local Kalmyks in Serbia but also made connections to Kalmyk communities from other parts of Europe. Torghut princess Nirjidma visited the temple on 20 September 1933. They also had a Buddhist religious school in the center and classes of the Kalmyk language.

Due to their appearance, the local population colloquially called them "Chinese". As there was a big discrepancy in the gender ratio of the emigrants, one woman to five men, their number in Belgrade never grew over 500. As a result of the cordial relations the two communities had, there were Kalmyk–Serbian marriages, where Kalmyk men would marry Serbian women. As witnesses from that period reported, children from those marriages had "white complexion inherited from us, and slanty eyes inherited from them". The pagoda had a beautiful rose garden and when the wind would blow, the wind chimes would make music. Kalmyks would often serve tea to the neighbors and during the religious holidays they would give presents to the children from the neighborhood.

In 1934, following the Buddhist customs, 49 days after the assassination of King Alexander in Marseille, a service was held as he was the temple's benefactor. Another benefactor was the 1926–1932 US ambassador to Belgrade, John D. Prince.

The Kalmyks soon became known as diligent workers. Apart from brickworks, they mostly worked as carters and tailors. The best known Kalmyk in Yugoslavia was Učur Kuljdinov, footballer of the FK Jugoslavija. They were also known for horse breeding. When Palace Albanija, which was to be the highest building in the Balkans, was built in 1938–1940, the project envisioned three floors below the ground. As the city government had no machinery required for the job, they invited the Kalmyks, with their horses and carts, to remove the rubble and earth from the foundation pit.

== World War II ==
During the war, relations between the neighbors turned sour. On the one side, Kalmyks sided with the German occupying forces and on the other, the city government, which was part of the German-appointed puppet regime in Serbia, stripped them of financial support in 1942 as they were not of "Serbian nationality". With the advance of Yugoslav Partisans and Soviet Red Army in September 1944, and fearing the reprisals of the latter, some 300 remaining Kalmyks withdrew with German troops, first to Germany and then resettling in New Jersey, United States of America, where they established a new colony. They moved in 1951-1952 and mostly settled in the Monmouth County.

== After 1945 ==
From 12 to 16 October 1944, during the final days of the Liberation of Belgrade, the upper section of the temple was demolished due to fighting in its vicinity. Since there were no believers left, nor the religious artifacts, the new Communist government did not consider it to be the temple anymore. In 1950 the dome was completely torn down and the ground level was adapted into the cultural center. Organizations like the Socialist Alliance of Working People of Yugoslavia and Women's Antifascist Front of Yugoslavia held conferences in it, but it was also used for more public venues, like weddings and dances. Still, even in the late 1950s, the area was colloquially called "Chinese Quarter". The building was then transferred to the Budućnost company, which demolished the building completely in the mid-1960s and constructed a new, two-floor building instead. The company set its cooling service in it, but the edifice has been locked and out of use for a long time.

== Legacy ==
The Belgrade pagoda is considered one of the earliest Buddhist temples in Europe, probably only the second specifically built for this purpose and in the pagoda-style, after the Datsan Gunzechoinei temple in St. Petersburg, built from 1909 to 1915.

The Kalmyks and their temple are almost completely forgotten today, but still, they were an inspiration for several works, including the study Kalmyks in Serbia 1920-44 by Toma Milenković (1998), a novel Kaja, Belgrade and the Good American by Mirjana Đurđević (2009; "Good American" being US ambassador John D. Prince) and a documentary There were Kalmyks in Belgrade once by Boško Milosavljević (2012). However, in the 2010s, newspapers began to occasionally print articles on Kalmyks, bringing their story more and more to modern readers and usually referring to the temple as the Belgrade pagoda.

Despite oblivion, Kalmyks left a big mark in modern Belgrade's etymology. One of the largest modern neighborhoods, Konjarnik ("horse breeding area"), which fully developed from the 1960s on, is named after the horses Kalmyks used to keep in this area before the war (konj is Serbian for horse).

== Literature ==
- Prince, John Dyneley (1928). "A Note on Kalmuks in Belgrade". American Anthropologist. 30 (2). [American Anthropological Association, Wiley]: 341–345. ISSN 0002-7294. JSTOR 661352.
- Josip Suchy: "Na obisku pri budistih", Jutro, br.171, 1932.
- Stevan Popović: "Beogradski Kalmici", Beograd, Beogradske opštinske novine, br.12,1939.
- Hemut Klar: "Kalmucks and the Wheel", London, The Middle Way, 29, 3, 1954.
- Helmut Klar: "Die Kalmücken und ihr Tempel in Belgrad und München", Bodhi Baum, 5, 1/1980
- Olga Latinčić: "Budistički hram u Beogradu", Arhivski pregled, Beograd, 1-2/1982
- Zmago Šmitek: "Kalmička zajednica u Beogradu", Kulture Istoka, 25/1990
- Arash Bormanshinov: "Prvi budstički hram u Evropi"; Elista, Šambala, 5–6/, 1997.
- Toma Milenković: "Kalmici u Srbiji (1920 -1944)"; Beograd, 1998.
- Lazar, Vukotić; Hristić, Danilovij; Vukotić, Borovnjak (2012-03-01). "The first Buddhist temple in Europe". Istorijski Zapisi. 85 (1/2). ISSN 0021-2652.
- Pavlović, Ana Ćirić (2018). "A Multinational Haven for Refugees? The Interwar Kingdom of the South Slavs". Being a refugee: a European narrative (PDF). Vienna: Institute of Culture Studies and Theatre History, Austrian Academy of Sciences. pp. 73–77. ISBN 978-3-200-05731-9.
