= Zvezdara Forest =

Forest in Belgrade, Serbia

- Звездарска шума Zvezdarska šuma
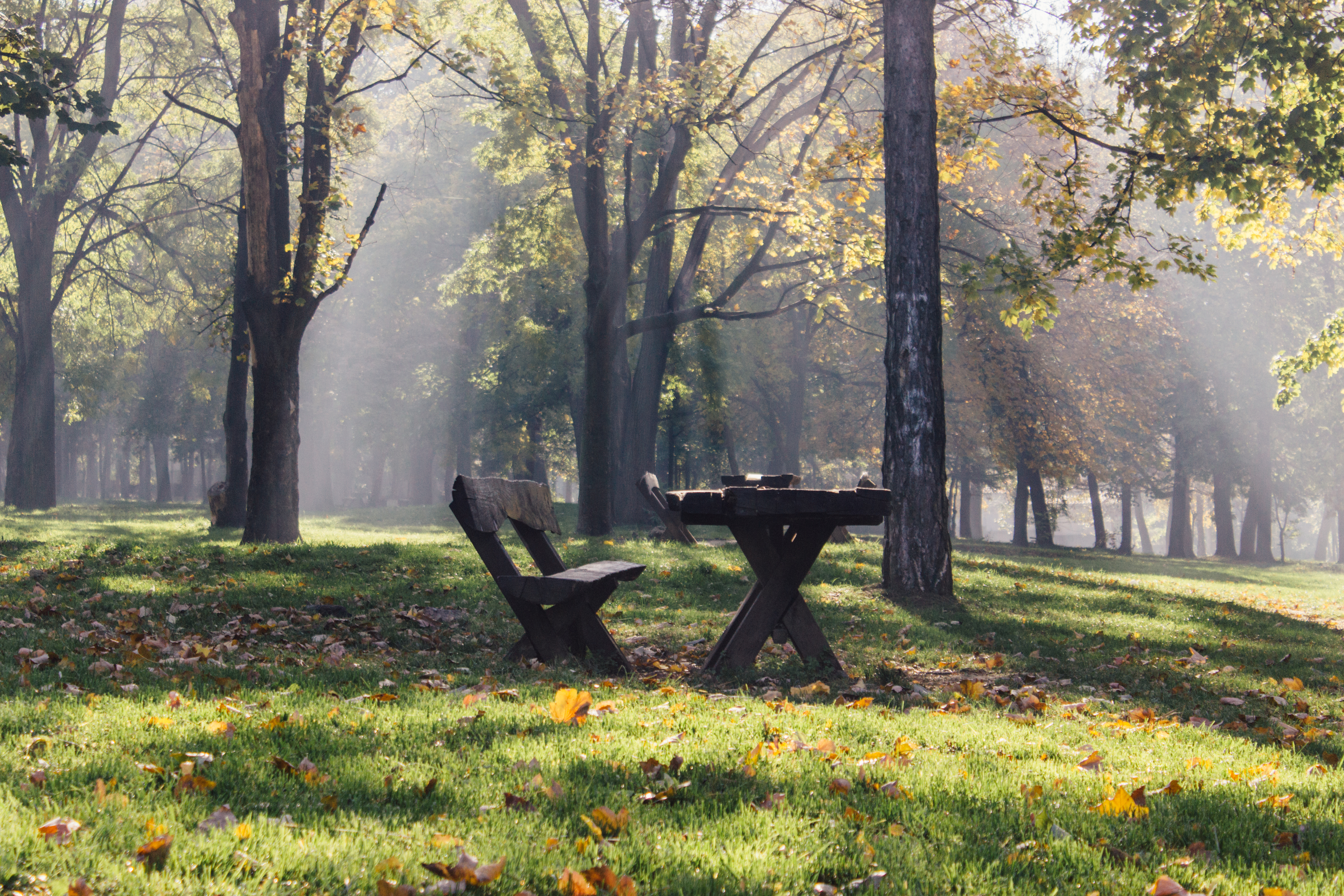
- Zvezdara Forest

- Location within Belgrade
- Location: Zvezdara, Belgrade
- Coordinates: 44.804°N 20.510°E
- Open: Open all year

Zvezdara Forest (Serbian: Звездарска шума / Zvezdarska šuma) is a park-forest in Belgrade, the capital of Serbia. Majority of the forest is located in the municipality of Zvezdara with only the small northernmost section being on the territory of Palilula. After Košutnjak and Topčider, Zvezdara is the largest forest in the urban zone of Belgrade and with them, the most important source of the oxygen for the city. While the Košuntjak-Topčider complex is being called the "Belgrade's oxygen factory", Zvezdara forest bears the moniker "left lung of the city".

== Location ==
Zvezdara forest is completely surrounded by the city's urban area and covers most of the 253 m (830 ft) tall Zvezdara Hill. It is situated in the northernmost section of the municipality of Zvezdara, on the border with Palilula. The northern and eastern boundary of the forest is formed mostly by the Dragoslava Srejovića street, except for a wooded patch which spreads into the neighborhood of Karaburma. Karaburma marks the forest's northern (Stara Karaburma) and northeastern border (Ćalije). The forest is bordered by the neighborhood of Mirijevo on the east, Zeleno Brdo on the southeast, Zvezdara on the south, Bulbulder and Zvezdara II on the east and Bogoslovija on the northeast.

== Name and history ==
On the northern slopes of the hill remnants of the prehistoric and Celtic period have been found (Rospi Ćuprija). Historically, Zvezdara hill was known as Veliki Vračar (Great Vračar). Vračаr area at that time occupied much wider area that it does today and was divided into West Vračar, East Vračar and Great Vračar. Turkish source from 1621 describes it as "a hill and a big field". In the 17th and 18th century, the area was covered in vineyards, orchards and lush oriental gardens, a major excursion ground for the wealthy Belgrade Turks which called the hill Ekmekluk and built their summer houses there. When Belgrade was occupied in 1717 by the Austria, a defense moat was built whose outer section crossed the hill, where the modern Volgina street is today. After Austria re-occupied Belgrade in 1789, the trench was reconstructed by the general Ernst Gideon von Laudon and became known as the "Laudan trench" (Serbian: Laudanov šanac or simply Šanac). Due to the military importance of the hill, its gardens were neglected.

In the 19th century the foothills were not urbanized and, being far from the city center, were used by the Belgraders as a resort and picnic area, named Baba Ružin kraj ("Grandma Ruža's neighborhood"). King Peter I of Serbia wanted to build his royal court on the hill but was persuaded not to do so because it would be easily accessed from the Danube'd direction in the case of war. In the beginning of the 20th century the Veliki Vračar Hill area was designed for afforestation. After the World War I the hill was covered with meadows, vineyards and many brickyards and the neighborhood at the foothills of Veliki Vračar began to develop, mostly a modest settlements of the farmers and wage earners. In 1929-32 an observatory designed by Czech-born architect Jan Dubový (1892–1969) was built on top of the hill, roughly in the middle of the forest. The observatory was originally called zvezdara ("star-house") in Serbian, so the hill and the developing suburban area of Belgrade around it was named that way soon. In time, Latinism opservatorija replaced zvezdara, which in turn completely disappeared from spoken language as such, but remained as a name of Belgrade's neighborhood. As a result, many today believe Zvezdara was named simply after stars (Serbian zvezda, star). After the construction of the observatory, the forest creation began in 1933, making a unique artificially created green zone in Belgrade's urban tissue. The forestation was intensified after 1945. The most massive forestation occurred from 1948 to 1950 when tens of thousands of seedlings were planted. Belgrade's 1972 General urban plan officially classified Zvezdara forest as the park-forest.

After Belgrade was declared a national ski center in 1934, there were plans for the construction of ski pistes at the outskirts of the city. One of the proposed locations were the still baren sections of the Veliki Vračar. Due to the gentle slopes, the planned skiing ground was selected for the beginners. In the end, skiing facilities were built by 1936 on the Košutnjak hill and the Avala mountain instead.

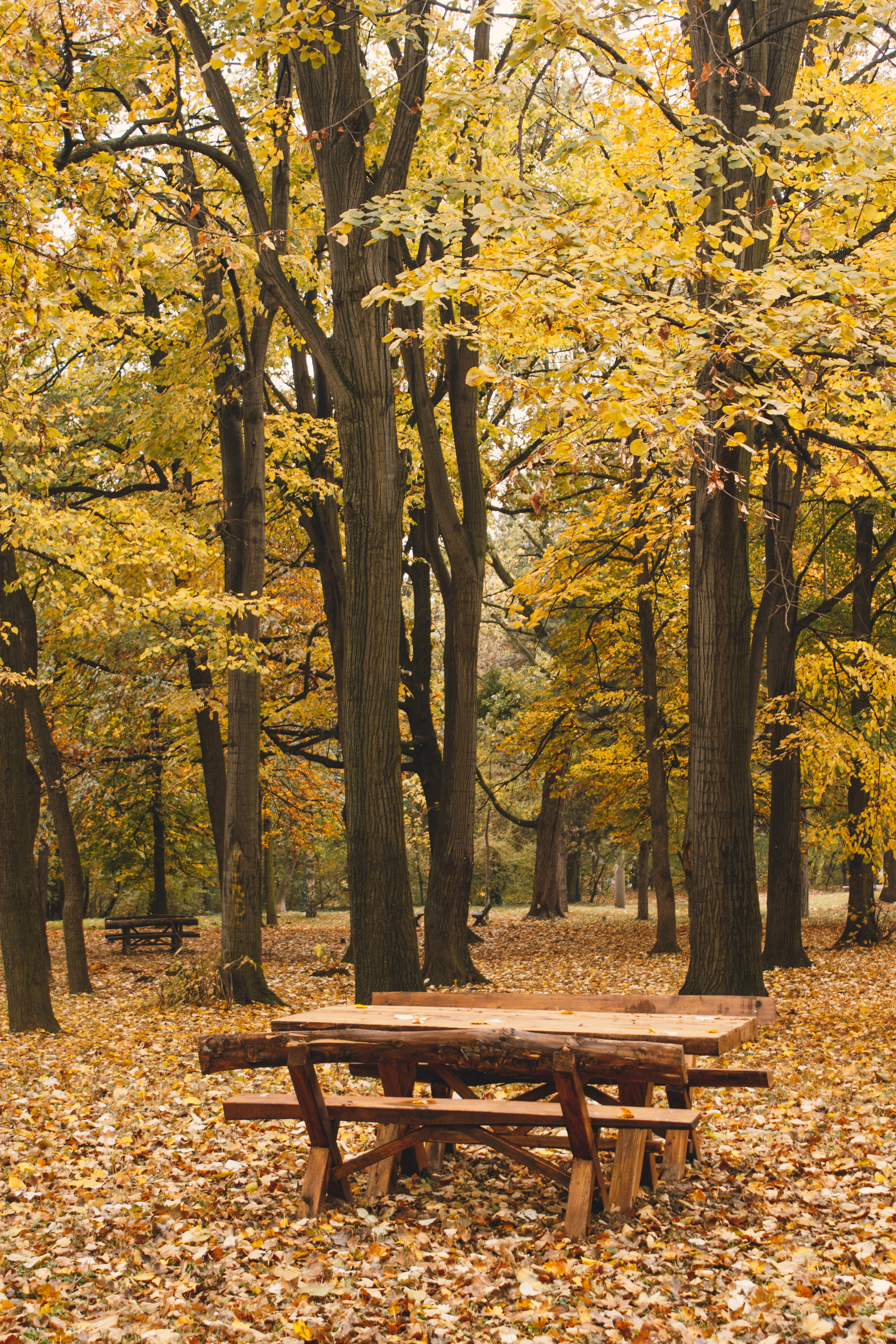
Zvezdara forest in the fall

== Characteristics ==
The forest is generally a crescent-shaped wooded area which today covers an area of 137 ha (340 acres), out of which 21 ha (52 acres) is arranged as a park. There are many paths and proper streets, including the Volgina street which criss crosses the entire forest. The forest was partially expanded to alleviate the effect of the strong košava wind. while the extension on the southern slope, towards the hospital, prevents the possible mass wasting. It creates a milder microclimate, conducts fresh air to the central urban tissue, prevents the erosion and creates a mass natural underground water reservoir. Also, it prevents the pollution from the industrial city of Pančevo on the east to reach the center of the city.

== Features ==
Apart from the observatory, objects within the forest or near it include the "Mihajlo Pupin Institute" in the north-central and seven small stadiums (FC 29. Novembar, FC Zvezdara, FC Mladi proleter, FC Bulbulderac, Omladinski Stadium) in the north-western section. Children complex "Zvezdani Gaj" is also located in the forest. Patches of the northern section are urbanized, forming a neighborhood of Zvezdara II (especially along the Dragoslava Srejovića street). South of the forest are the Clinical-hospital Center Zvezdara and sports center Olimp. The hospital was built in the early 1930s and is colloquially known as the "City hospital". East of the forest is the Belgrade New Cemetery.

The forest is damaged by the unauthorized individual residential construction, so in 2007 Belgrade City government announced further plans to extend the Zvezdara Forest to the north and south, connecting it in the process to Ada Huja and Šumice, respectively, either as real park or just avenues, and thus creating Belgrade's greenway. But in 2009 city authorities decided to transform parts of the wood into the building land, allegedly to expand the hospital complex, though the projected land covered three times more area than the complex occupies now. Also the city wanted to build the church and summer houses at the center of the forest. Altogether, a 5 ha (12 acres) of wood was to be cut and cleared. This prompted the protests of the local population which wanted to preserve the forest. The protest was publicly supported by musicians Dejan Cukić, Sevdah baby, Beogradski Sindikat and others, who organized concerts to support the cause. The city health department responded that they only wanted to build two additional buildings in the hospital complex on just a few ares, while the Environment Department issued a statement that they don't support any cutting of the forest. City later dropped the idea.

In 2012 a Science Technology Park Belgrade was finished and opened, after being in the construction since 1989. It is located in the east central entry into the park.

In July 2017 the city government announced the project of "Zvezdara promenade". It is supposed to be the 900 m (3,000 ft) long forested esplanade which would connect the Volgina street and the FC Mladi proleter stadium with the roundabout in the neighborhood of Bogoslovija. The promenade will have small squares and scenic viewpoints. It is part of the wider reconstruction of the area which would cover 35.18 ha (86.9 acres). The project includes the removal or reconstruction of many public buildings and companies but also a possibility of demolition of the small, residential houses with backyards and construction of the 5-storey buildings.

== Wildlife ==
=== Plants ===
Zvezdara forest is an example of an urban biotope. There are 136 plant species in the forest. Trees are mostly allochthonous and typical for the ruderal habitats. Nine of the tree species are rare, relict, endemic or endangered: American mountain ash, white poplar, cherry tree, birch, Norway maple, European white-elm, walnut tree, field elm and Turkish hazel. The most common tree species in the forest include black locust, black poplar, Canadian poplar, sycamore maple, pedunculate oak, black pine and Scots pine. In 2009 an average tree age was estimated at 50 years.

Herbaceous plants are typical for this area: sweetscented bedstraw, wood avens, white dead-nettle, yellow archangel, cleavers and blackberries. There are no protected or endangeres species of this type of plants.

=== Animals ===
There are three amphibian and four reptilian species in the forest. Amphibians are fire salamander, European green toad and agile frog, while the reptiles include slowworm, European green lizard, common wall lizard and Caspian whipsnake.

Zvezdara forest is inhabited by the 48 bird species, in different protection statuses. There are 21 species of the birds which nest in the protected area, with another 9 species in the rest of the forest. In winter and during the migration, another 9 species settles in the forest. Protected species include common buzzard, tawny owl, long-eared owl, scops owl and little owl. By 2021, a total of 77 species was recorded in the forest, including nightingale, Eurasian blackcap, great tit, common blackbird, and black woodpecker.

Protected mammal species are northern white-breasted hedgehog (which has been chosen as the symbol of the forest) and European mole.

== Protection ==
Zvedara forest is protected as the natural monument (IUCN Category III), which many consider to be too low level of protection so environmental groups and local population agitate for that to change. The protected area is 80.57 ha (199.1 acres) owned by the state and 87 m^{2} (940 sq ft) of privately owned land.
