= Zeleno Brdo =

Neighborhood in Belgrade, Serbia

Coordinates: 44°47′16″N 20°31′12″E

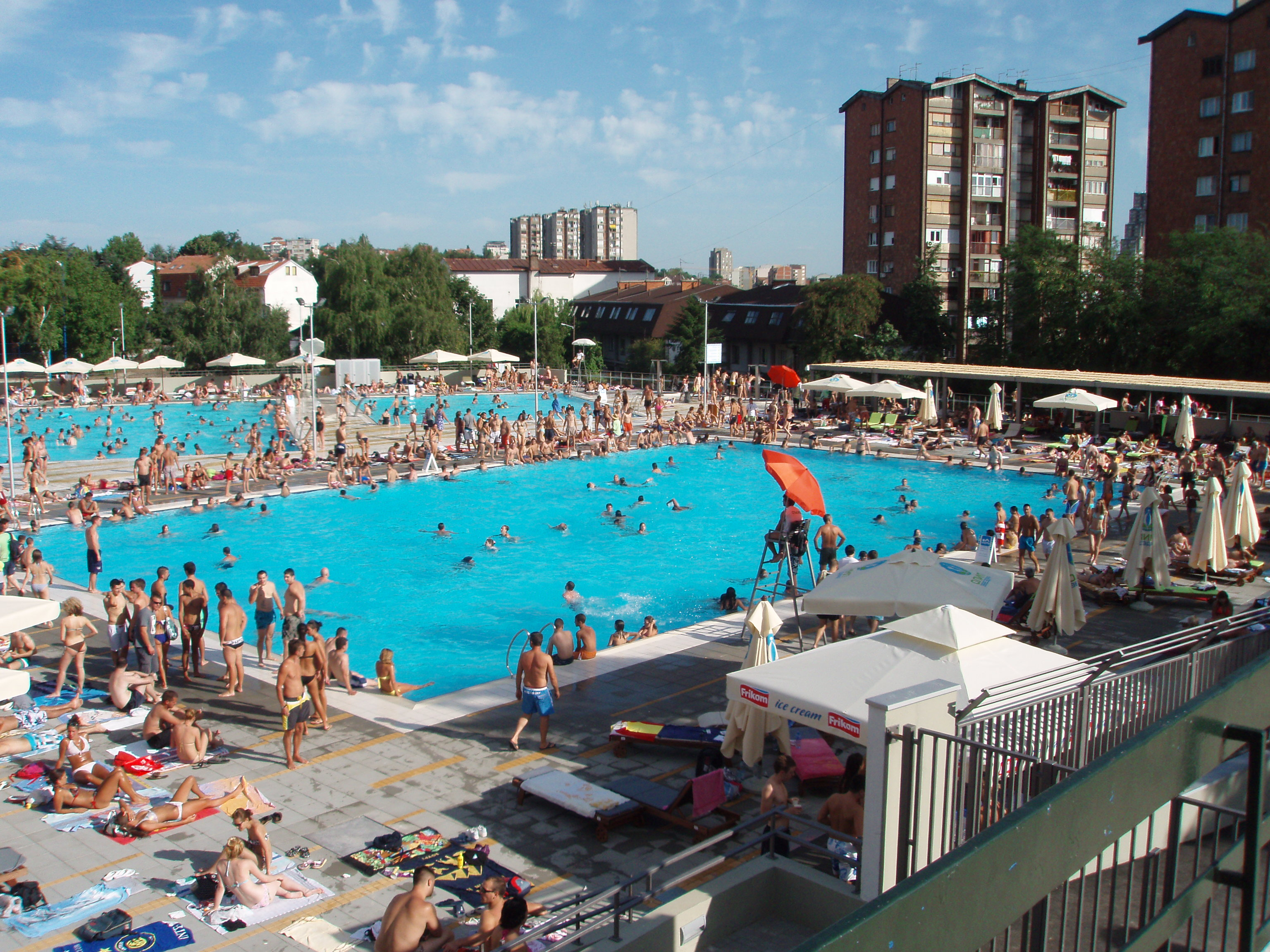
Sports center Olimp is located in the neighborhood of Zeleno Brdo

Zeleno Brdo (Serbian Cyrillic: Зелено Брдо) is an urban neighborhood of Belgrade, the capital of Serbia. It is located in Belgrade's municipality of Zvezdara.

== Location ==
It is situated between two urban settlements those being Mali Mokri Lug and Mirijevo. It spreads along, mostly north of, the Bulevar kralja Aleksandra. It stretches from Cvetkova Pijaca on the west to Mali Mokri Lug on the southeast, bordering neighborhoods of Učiteljsko Naselje and Konjarnik on the south. It also borders Zvezdara Forest on the north, Staro Mirijevo on the northeast and Mirijevo II on the east.

== Characteristics ==
Though today a separate neighborhood, it was previously considered, at least partly, a part of Mirijevo. It is located on the top of the hill of the same name. Name of the hill, and of the subsequent neighborhood, means "green hill" in Serbian and came from the period before the urbanization, when it was a barren hill, covered only in grass.

There is a water spring in the modern neighborhood, which was the source for one of the three aqueducts which supplied the city of Singidunum, or Belgrade Fortress. During the Ottoman period, it was known as the Ekmekluk (modern Zvezdara) fork, belonging to the Mali Mokri Lug village area. It went via modern Cvetkova Pijaca and Terazije neighborhoods. The Ottomans roofed the aqueduct, turning it into the tunnel. The Dahije renegades used this tunnel to infiltrate the fortress in 1801, and to overthrow and kill Belgrade's vizier Hadji Mustafa Pasha. The Dahije then demolished the aqueduct, fearing someone might use it against them, the way they did against Mustafa Pasha.

There was a drinking fountain at the spring, known at the time as the Colorful Fountain, Šarena česma. During the First Serbian Uprising, leader of the rebels Karađorđe made a deal with new Belgrade's vizier Suleyman Pasha, guaranteeing the safe retreat to the Ottomans and their families to Bulgaria. The rebels still ambushed the retreating Ottomans on 7 March 1807, at the fountain. The pasha and his entourage of 180 askeri nizams were killed, while women and children were dispatched to Vidin, Bulgaria, their original destination.

After pasha's death, the fountain became known as the Pasha's Fountain, Pašina česma, the name it still bears today. Additionally, a previously unnamed hill to the east became known as Pašino Brdo, or Pasha's Hill, and is today one of the urban neighborhoods of Belgrade. It is today located in the Živka Davidovića Street, on the border with the neighborhood of Učiteljsko Naselje. The fountain, and the surrounding plateau, were renovated and reopened on 15 October 2014.

== Administration ==
Zeleno Brdo is a local community, a sub-municipal administrative unit, within the municipality of Zvezdara. According to the censuses, it had a population of 10,343 in 1981, 8,945 in 1991, 9,819 in 2002 and 11,408 in 2011.
