= Lion, Belgrade =

Lion Лион
- Urban neighbourhood
- Location within Belgrade
- Coordinates: 44°47′48″N 20°30′02″E
- Country: Serbia
- Region: Belgrade
- Municipality: Zvezdara
- Time zone: UTC+1 (CET)
  - Summer (DST): UTC+2 (CEST)
- Area code: +381(0)11
- Car plates: BG

Lion (Serbian Cyrillic: Лион) is an urban neighborhood of Belgrade, the capital of Serbia. It is located in Belgrade's municipality of Zvezdara.

== Location ==
Lion is located along the old Belgrade's longest street, Bulevar kralja Aleksandra, 3 kilometers south-east of downtown Belgrade (Terazije). It borders the neighborhoods of Bulbuder on the north-east, Đeram on the west, Lipov Lad on the south-west, Denkova Bašta on the south, and Cvetkova Pijaca on the east.

== Characteristics ==
Before World War II, Lion was a commercial centar on the boulevard, with many tobacco and grocery stores, bookshops and craftsman shops. The neighborhood got its name after the kafana "Lion", opened during the Interbellum at the corner of Bulevar Kralja Aleksandra and Miloša Zečevića, which was named after the French town of Lyon. Kafana was a favorite place for pre-war state employees, clerks, military officers, teachers and writers, and was known for pool, chess and domino tournaments, so as for the Sunday's dances for the youth. After World War II it became a "typical socialist kafana", popular with the families for Sunday lunch, but also visited by the municipal clerks. In the 1990s it was turned into the restaurant, and then brewery, before it was closed by the end of the decade. The venue was later turned into the grocery store.

Though mainly residential area today, Lion still has a developed commercial section along the boulevard so as several schools. Stadium of FK Hajduk and theater of "Zvezdara Teatar" are also located in the neighborhood. The population of Lion was 5,509 by the 2002 census.

The Sixth Belgrade Gymnasium is located in the neighborhood, in the Milana Rakića Street. It was founded by the King Alexander I of Yugoslavia royal decree in 1933, and moved few times before settling in the present building in Lion, built from 1939 to 1942. It holds present name since 1958. Next to the gymnasium there is a park of the same name, sometimes also called Slavujev Potok Park. It covers 1.18 hectares (2.9 acres).
