= Nikola Vojinović =

Nikola Vojinović may refer to:

- Nikola Altomanović, 14th-century Serbian župan of the House of Vojinović
- Nikola Vojinović (politician) (born 1985), politician in Serbia
