= Mirijevo =

Mirijevo Миријево
- Urban neighbourhood
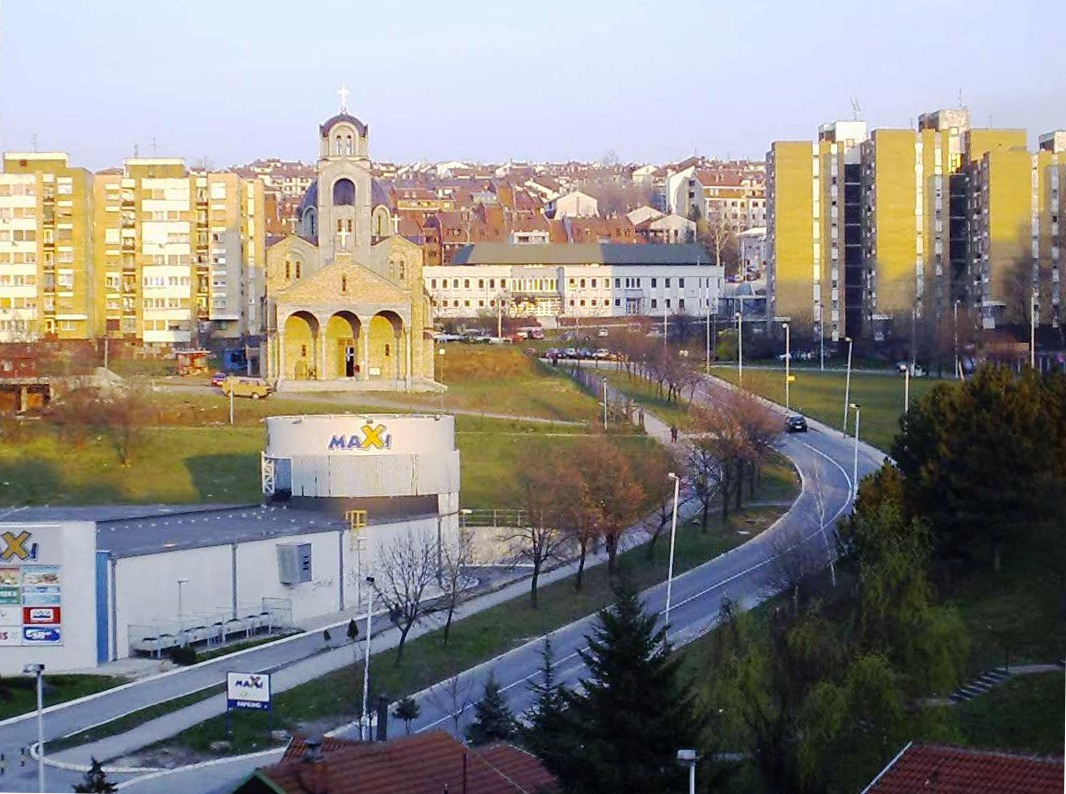
- Mirijevo

- Location within Belgrade
- Coordinates: 44°47′11″N 20°32′41″E
- Country: Serbia
- Region: Belgrade
- Municipality: Zvezdara

Population (2023)
  - Total: 101.278
- Time zone: UTC+1 (CET)
  - Summer (DST): UTC+2 (CEST)
- Area code: +381(0)11
- Car plates: BG

Mirijevo (Serbian Cyrillic: Миријево, pronounced [mǐrijɛʋɔ]) is an urban neighborhood of Belgrade, Serbia. It is located in Belgrade's municipality of Zvezdara. One of the largest single neighborhoods in Europe, consists of several sub-neighborhoods (Staro & Novo Mirijevo, Mirijevo II-IV, etc.)

== Location and geography ==
Mirijevo is located 11 kilometers east of downtown Belgrade, on the eastern outskirts of Belgrade's urban zone. It extends into the neighborhoods of Ćalije on the north, Zvezdara on the west and Mali Mokri Lug (Zeleno Brdo) on the south. The neighborhood developed in the valley of Mirijevski potok (creek which is a right tributary to the Danube, at the neighborhood of Rospi Ćuprija), between the Zvezdara hill in the west (253 meters), Orlovica hill (274 meters, read as Orlovitsa; on some city maps given as Orlovača) in the north-east and Stojčino hill (274 meters) in the south, so the neighborhood today mostly develops in the south-east, the only remaining unurbanized part of the valley.

The territory of Mirijevo was a mass wasting area. During the rapid construction of the neighborhood from the 1970s, since majority of the buildings were highrise, the terrain was systematically improved. As a result, the movement of the land is today completely halted and Mirijevo is considered as the most successful project of fixing the mass wasting problem in Belgrade.

Urban forest cover 1.89 hectares (4.7 acres) within the neighborhood. In the expansion of the population of jackals in the outskirts of Belgrade since the 2000s, the animals were reported in the neighborhood in the spring of 2022.

== Name ==
Name of the neighborhood comes from the word mirija, originating in Turkish miri. It depicted a patch of land (arable land, gardens, etc.), which during the Ottoman period was leased and on which the tax had to be paid.

== History and population ==
Historical population
Year	Pop.	±%
1921	1,410	—
1953	2,067	+46.6%
1961	3,607	+74.5%
1971	7,936	+120.0%
1981	16,141	+103.4%
1991	35,703	+121.2%
2002	36,590	+2.5%
2011	41,407	+13.2%

Elementary school was founded in 1851, completely funded by the donations from the denizens.

In the 19th and early 20th century, the area of modern Bulbulder neighborhood in Zvezdara consisted of yards and gardens. Bulgarian settlers were cultivating vegetables, which was then directly sold on the wooden benches in front of the gardens. The settlement changed after the city cemetery was transferred from Tašmajdan to the northern section of the Bulbulder, as the Belgrade New Cemetery, in the 1886-1927 period. The creek of Bulbuderski potok was channeled and the construction of the houses began while the gardeners were transferred to Mirijevo.

Mirijevo used to be a separate village, outside Belgrade's urban zone, but as Belgrade developed, by the early 1970s Mirijevo became part of the city's urban area and lost separate status after 1971, becoming local community (mesna zajednica, sub-municipal administrative unit) within Belgrade city proper (uža teritorija grada). Massive population growth ensued. In 2011 population of the settlement was 41,407.

== Municipality movement ==
Movement which gained momentum during the ongoing protest from the local population against construction of the power transformer in the center of the neighborhood from the late 1990s. However, the idea is on hiatus at the moment.

== Sub-neighborhoods ==
=== Staro Mirijevo ===
Staro Mirijevo (Old Mirijevo) is the oldest part of the neighborhood, area of the former village of Mirijevo and it constitutes a separate local community. It occupies the northern section of the entire neighborhood, on the both sides of Mirijevski Potok, bordering Ćalije on the north, Zvezdara on the west, Orlovsko Naselje on the north-east, Mirijevo II on the south and Mirijevo III on the south-east. Area is mostly made from individual residential houses, with a population of 7,604 by the 2002 census (including Orlovsko Naselje) and 13,318 in 2011. Central streets are Jovanke Radaković and Vitezova Karađorđeve zvezde. Orthodox church of the Saint Prophet Elias is in the center of the neighborhood.

=== Novo Mirijevo ===
Novo Mirijevo (New Mirijevo) is a joint name for the local community with a population of 28,986 by the 2002 census and 28,089 in 2011. It consists of Mirijevo II, III and IV.

=== Mirijevo II ===
Central part of the neighborhood, characterized by the large residential buildings. It borders Staro Mirijevo on the north, Mirijevo III on the east and extends into Mali Mokri Lug on the south-west. Central street, going through the center of the neighborhood is Mirijevski venac while the southern border is marked by the parallel Matice srpske street. In April 2008 grassy area between the Mirijevski venac and Radivoja Markovića streets was projected as the future and first real park in the neighborhood. Park will consist of the linden trees and the existing playgrounds and bocce court will be renovated and become part of the park.

=== Mirijevo III ===
Eastern part of the neighborhood, entirely residential. Bounded by the streets of Matice srpske on the west and Koste Nađa on the east, it borders Mirijevo II on the west and Mirijevo IV on the south-east. A new Health Center, under construction since the 1990s was finally finished in 2009, while a new kindergarten was also completed in 2008.

=== Mirijevo IV ===
The latest, south-eastern extension of the neighborhood. From Koste Nadja Street and along Samuel Beckett and Mikhail Bulgakov Streets, this is the largest of the Mirijevo neighborhoods. One of the largest schools in Belgrade and Serbia, Pavle Savic Elementary School is also located there. The newest parts of the neighborhood extend along the 1,1 kilometer long road connecting Mirijevo to the Smederevski put, a road connecting Belgrade and Smederevo via Belgrade's suburb of Grocka. The road was opened in 2007 and shortened the trip from suburbs in Grocka direction (like Kaluđerica) for 11 kilometers. For over a 20 years a beltway circumventing central part of Mirijevo is planned and the construction should began in 2008. It will bypass the neighborhood from Mirijevo IV, through the unurbanized eastern side to the beginning of the Mirijevo boulevard in the southern part of the neighborhood of Ćalije, north of Mirijevo itself.

=== Orlovsko Naselje ===
Orlovsko Naselje (Serbian Cyrillic: Орловско насеље) is the north-eastern extension of Mirijevo. It is mostly an informal settlement of the Romani people. The main street in the settlement is Orlovska, meaning "eagle street" (thus the neighborhood is called "eagle settlement") as it leads into the foothills of the neighboring Orlovača hill ("eagle hill").

The settlement was established in 1815. In 1968-1969, the inhabitants were partially resettled across the other parts of the city in the newly built apartments. In the early 2000s, various alleys of the Orlovska street were named after people who were connected to Romani people, either by their origin or through their work: Django Reinhardt, Yul Brynner, Rabindranath Tagore, Jovan Janićijević Burduš, etc. Population of the settlement is estimated to 900-1,000.

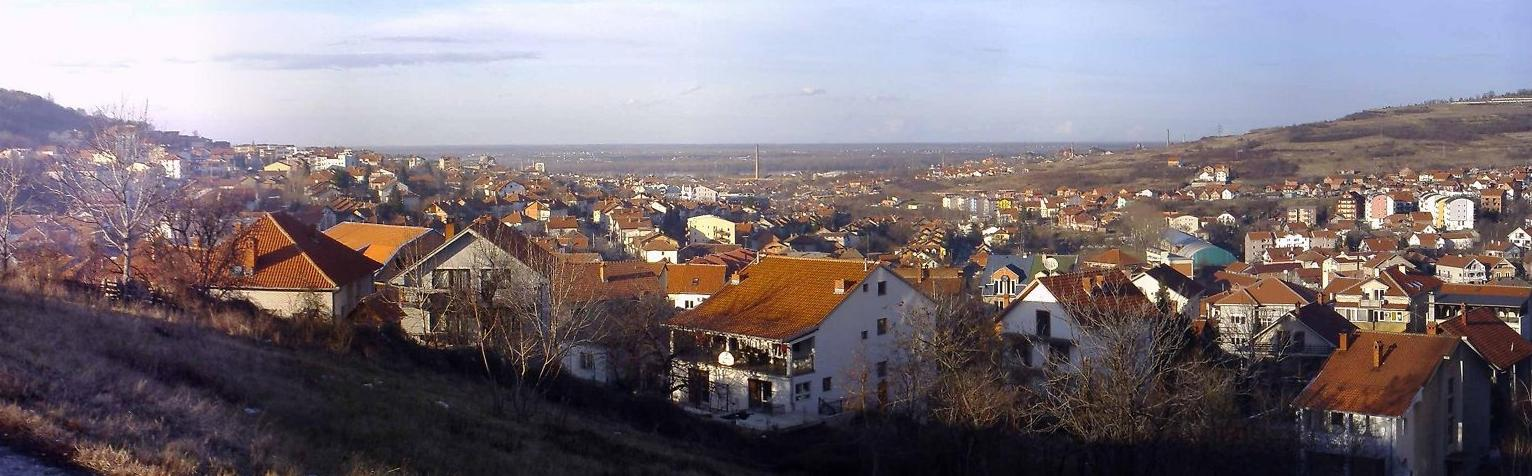
Mirijevo valley

=== Šoferski Raj ===
Small settlement developed in the mid 2000s, along the Ljubiše Miodragovića street, as the southernmost extension of Mirijevo. As majority of the original inhabitants were truck or bus drivers, the settlement is colloquially named Šoferski Raj (Chauffeur’s Paradise). It developed without building permits and lacks the basic communal infrastructure like street lights, public transportation, grocery shops, proper power grid, etc.

=== Bajdina ===
Forested hill of Bajdina is located south of Mirijevo, separating it from Mali Mokri Lug. It covers 67 hectares (170 acres). In February 2022, city announced urbanization of the entire area, with "characteristics of the modern city centers". Plan is to lift number of housing units from 70 to 4,476, and number of population from 288 to 12,085. Project includes two elementary school, five kindergartens, social security center, healthcare center, residential and commercial zones, urban centers, park, three forested areas, Serbian Orthodox church, and a protective green belt around the neighborhood. City later removed one school from the plans, added more buildings, and raised the number of floors, apparently lifting the number of housing units to over 5,000 and new residents up to 15,000.

Some 80% of Bajdina is covered by forest. Residents protested, claiming that the project includes cutting of 80% of existing forest (only 23% of the entire area will remain as "green areas"), and construction on three active and two potential downhill creeps, which cover 26 hectares (64 acres). Mass wasting was the major reason why this area, with addition of the underground and surface waters problem, wasn't urbanized so far, even by the illegal construction which is corruptive problem of epic proportions in Serbia. All prior city plans described this section as highly unsuitable for construction, with the possibility of intensifying and reactivating mass wasting, which is also mentioned in the plan's accompanying documentation, though the mass wasting area was reduced in the papers. It was also stated that the present traffic and communal infrastructure is not adequate for present number of inhabitants, let alone for additional 15,000.

Despite the claims by the city that the area has been intensively urbanized since the 2000s, in 2022 there were less than 300 inhabitants in the area included in the plan. This area, however, includes small parts of already urbanized neighborhood of Mirijevo IV, so Bajdina is almost uninhabited. The protesters also said that Mirijevo has one only promenade-like pathway, and one proper park, so that Bajdina should be transformed into the park-forest, eventually with sports and recreational zones, swimming pools, etc. Additionally, when city changed its general urban plan in 2016, all green areas in Mirijevo were declared a building locations. It was pointed out that such large wooded area is beneficial to Belgrade's microclimate, and that Bajdina makes sort of a buffer zone between the city and its landfill in Vinča. Some 60 species of birds were recorded in the forest.

Though the city's plan came out of nowhere, citizens managed to file over 300 complaints during the public inspection of the plan in April 2022, but city rejected them all, shutting down public debates twice during the inspection period. In late June 2022, after several smaller protests, regular weekly protests of Mirijevo residents against the project began.

== Transportation ==
=== Mirijevo Boulevard ===
Mirijevo was badly connected to the rest of the city, mostly through the narrow streets in Zvezdara (Milana Rakića, Mite Ružića) bringing heavy traffic to the Bulevar Kralja Aleksandra. In the late 1990s, the idea of constructing the Mirijevo Boulevard (Serbian: Миријевски булевар, romanized: Mirijevski bulevar), in the north-to-south direction was proposed, which would connect Mirijevo to the Višnjička street on the north, thus connecting it to the Rospi Ćuprija, Karaburma, Bogoslovija and further with the downtown. Due to the property ownership problems, the construction dragged for years. Final phase began on 7 February 2011 and was finished in November. It included the construction of the final 1 km (0.62 mi) of the boulevard, intersections with the Mirijevo's cross streets, sidewalks, city lights and the 1.25 km (0.78 mi) long underground concrete collector which conducted the stream of Mirijevski potok underground.
