= Edip Šerifov =

Serbian politician

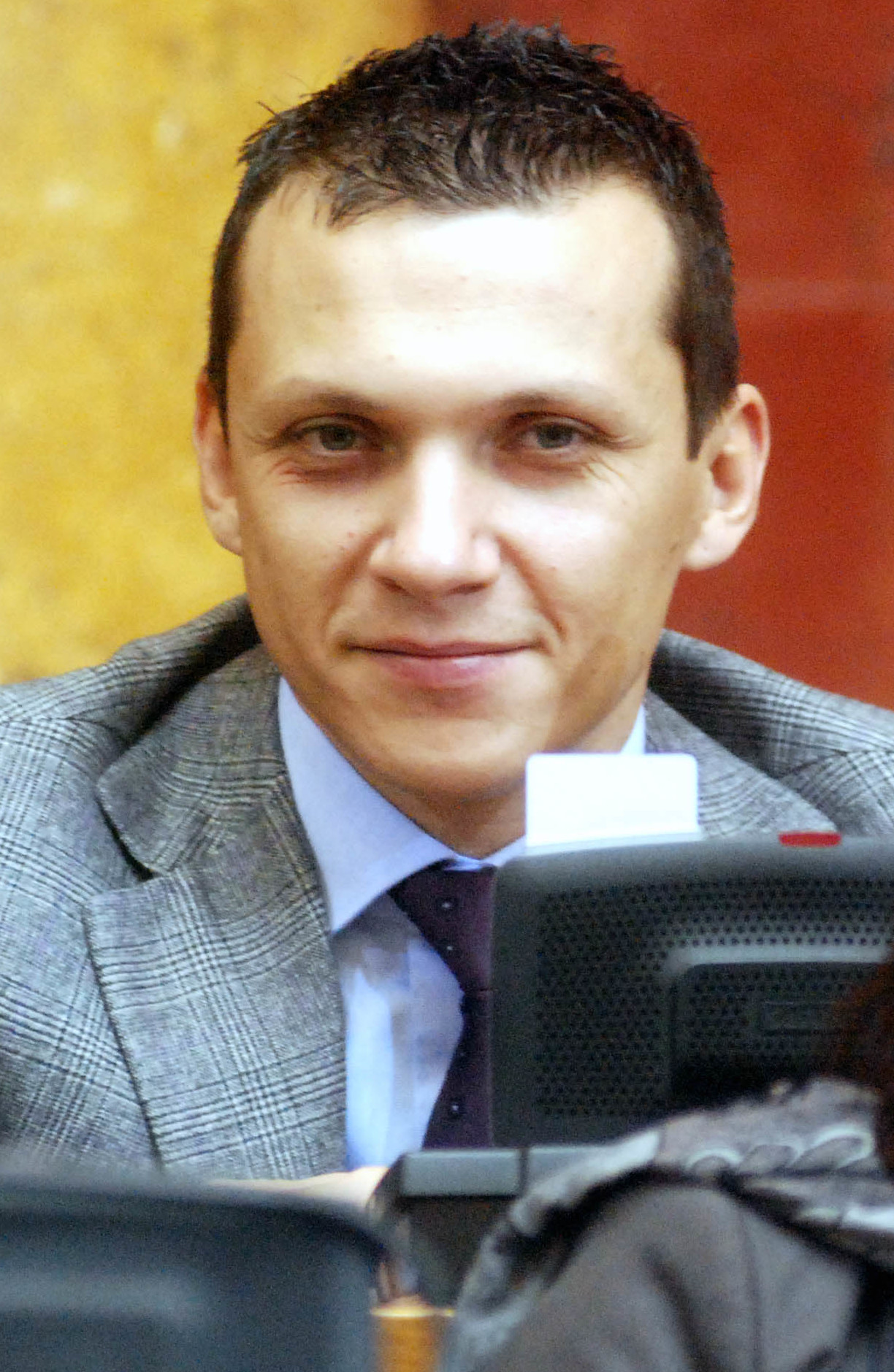
Šerifov in 2009

Edip Šerifov (Serbian Cyrillic: Едип Шерифов; 2 October 1977) is a politician in Serbia. He served in the National Assembly of Serbia from 2007 to 2012 and was mayor of the Belgrade municipality of Zvezdara from 2012 to 2016. During his political career, he was a member of the Democratic Party (Demokratska stranka, DS).

== Early life and career ==
Šerifov was born in Belgrade, in what was then the Socialist Republic of Serbia in the Socialist Federal Republic of Yugoslavia. He is a graduate of the University of Belgrade Faculty of Organizational Sciences.

== Politician ==
Šerifov joined the DS in 1999, became a member of the party's municipal board in Zvezdara in 2000, and became president of the municipal board in 2006. He was first elected to the Zvezdara municipal assembly in the 2000 Serbian local elections, which the DS contested as part of the Democratic Opposition of Serbia (DOS).

The DS fielded its own electoral list for Zvezdara in the 2004 Serbian local elections. Šerifov appeared on the list, although he did not take a mandate afterwards.

=== Parliamentarian ===
Šerifov was a DS candidate in the 2007 Serbian parliamentary election, appearing in the 245th position out of 250 on the party's list. The list won sixty-four mandates, and Šerifov was subsequently chosen as a member of the DS's assembly delegation. (From 2000 to 2011, all mandates in Serbian parliamentary elections were awarded to candidates on successful lists at the discretion of the sponsoring parties or coalitions; Šerifov's specific position on the list – which was in any event mostly alphabetical – had no bearing on his chances of election.) The DS formed an unstable coalition government with the rival Democratic Party of Serbia (Demokratska stranka Srbije, DSS) after the election, and Šerifov served as a supporter of the administration.

The DS–DSS coalition collapsed in early 2008, and a new parliamentary election was called for May of that year. Šerifov appeared on the DS's For a European Serbia list and was given a mandate for a second term when the list won 102 seats. The election results were initially inconclusive, but For a European Serbia ultimately formed a coalition government with the Socialist Party of Serbia, and Šerifov again served as a government supporter. He also appeared on the DS's list in Zvezdara for the 2008 Serbian local elections, which took place concurrently with the parliamentary election. As in 2004, he did not take a mandate.

=== Mayor of Zvezdara ===
Serbia's electoral system was reformed in 2011, such that parliamentary and local assembly mandates were awarded in numerical order to candidates on successful lists. Šerifov was given the ninety-second position on the DS's Choice for a Better Life list in the 2012 Serbian parliamentary election. The list won sixty-seven seats, and he was not returned. He also appeared in the second position on the DS's list for Zvezdara in the 2012 Serbian local elections and was elected when the list won twenty-three seats. The DS formed a local coalition government with the Liberal Democratic Party and the Socialists, and Šerifov was chosen as mayor. He served in this role for the next four years.

Šerifov also appeared in the sixteenth position on the DS's list for the 2014 Belgrade City Assembly election and was elected when the list won twenty-two mandates. The Serbian Progressive Party and its allies won the election, and the DS served in opposition.

He led the DS list for Zvezdara in the 2016 Serbian local elections and was re-elected when the list won seven mandates. The Progressives won the election, and the DS served in opposition. Šerifov resigned his seat in Zvezdara on 1 June 2016. He was not a candidate in Belgarde in 2018.
