= Lipov Lad =

Lipov Lad Липов Лад
- Urban neighbourhood
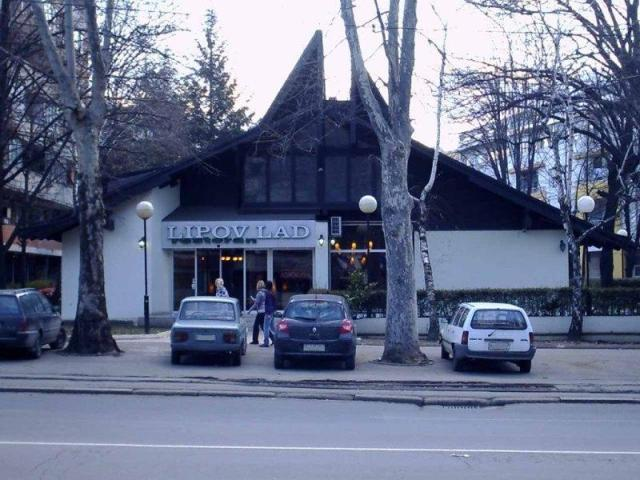
- Lipov Lad kafana

- Location within Belgrade
- Coordinates: 44.797477°N 20.493553°E
- Country: Serbia
- Region: Belgrade
- Municipality: Zvezdara

Area
  - Total: 0.21 km^{2} (0.081 sq mi)

Population (2011)
  - Total: 4,759
  - Density: 23,000/km^{2} (59,000/sq mi)
- Time zone: UTC+1 (CET)
  - Summer (DST): UTC+2 (CEST)
- Area code: +381(0)11
- Car plates: BG

Lipov Lad (Serbian: Липов Лад) is an urban neighborhood of Belgrade, the capital of Serbia. It is located in Belgrade's municipality of Zvezdara.

== Location ==
Historical population
Year	Pop.	±%
1981	6,989	—
1991	5,616	−19.6%
2002	5,162	−8.1%
2011	4,759	−7.8%

Lipov Lad is located between the right side of the Bulevar kralja Aleksandra and the left side of the Vojislava Ilića Street, being on border of the Zvezdara and Vračar municipalities, 2.5 m (8 ft 2 in) kilometers southeast of downtown Belgrade (Terazije). It extends into the neighborhoods of Lion on the east and Đeram and Crveni Krst on the west.

== Characteristics ==
After World War I, a string of new neighborhoods encircled eastern outskirts of Belgrade, with names usually containing "suburb" and some member of the royal family. These original names either never became popular or were suppressed after World War II and replaced. The inspiration for the design of the neighborhoods came from the complex built in 1912 along the Daviel Street in Paris. It consisted of 40 one-floor houses with gardens, indented from the main street. This style became very popular across the Europe. Name Suburb of Prince Tomislav was given to the area between the Boulevard and the modern Vojislava Ilića Street, but it didn't hold.

Prior to World War II, the neighborhood was called Borov Park. The area is residential, with present objects mostly built in the 1970s, with lawns and children playgrounds between the buildings, and some commercial facilities.

The most distinctive feature in the neighborhood is the famous kafana Lipov lad (Serbian for 'lime tree shade') which gave its name to the entire neighborhood. The original kafana was open in 1928. It became trendy in the late 1950s as a meeting place of the artists, actors, poets and local bohemians, and later became a popular family venue. In 1972 the entire neighborhood was reconstructed and many old buildings were demolished, including the old kafana. Only the lime trees were preserved and the new kafana building was constructed.

Lipov Lad constitutes a local community (mesna zajednica), sub-municipal administrative unit of the same name within the municipality of Zvezdara, with a population of 4,759 in 2011.

== Parks ==
In the block between the Bulevar Kralja Aleksandra and Vranjanska streets, there are green areas between the buildings within the block. They are called by numbers, and starting from the lowest section are Prvi Parkić (First Little Park, behind 276 Buelvar Kralja Aleksandra), Drugi Parkić (No. 282), Treći Parkić (No. 288), Čevtrti Parkić (No. 294), and Peti Parkić (No. 298).

=== Peti Park ===
Peti Parkić or Peti Park ("fifth park") is a small green area in the north-eastern corner of the neighborhood, on the corner of the Stanislava Sremčevića and Despota Olivera (formerly Toneta Tomšiča, name still largely used by the reporters) streets. In the mid-2005, city government cut trees in this area for the purpose of building a commercial complex. Local population protested, trying to keep the green area while city government claimed that the area was designed for construction in 1980s and that mini-park was just a temporary solution.

However, local residents gained a popular support among Belgraders and celebrities for their cause, as at one point even police was involved to make the construction possible. The investor, "Crnotravac", claimed to have legally obtained all necessary permits and tried to break into the parcel to start preparatory works. One night, a bulldozer broke into the lot, cutting numerous trees and demolishing a basketball court. Residents organized 24-hour watches to prevent this in the future, while musicians performed live and organized concerts on location. The protesters also gained support from various experts and politicians, including municipal and city legislators, and even from Boris Tadić, President of Serbia at the time. In January 2008 municipality of Zvezdara re-planted 31 firs in circular pattern in an effort to keep the park. Staunch defense of the park made worldwide news.

In October 2021, mayor Dragan Đilas announced that the deal was reached with the investor, who will be awarded another lot in some other part of the city. Residents declared "a victory". In May 2021, deputy mayor Goran Vesić stated that the former administration deceived everyone, as the land remained in investor's ownership, claiming he negotiated with the investor in the fall of 2020, so the investor decided to donate the land to the city. In that same month city finally began works on the lot which will turn, still mostly a meadow, into the proper park. The works were halted a month later, as residents disagreed with the way the park was arranged, since it differs from the project they agreed upon.

As one of the first mass protests of the citizens against the "investors' urbanism", the park became "famous" and a "symbol of citizens' fight".

=== Beograd Bašta ===
In the western border of the neighborhood, along the Bregalnička Street, there is a green area known as the Beograd Bašta ("Belgrade garden"). Covering 0.41 ha (1.0 acre), it was an outdoor screen of the "Beograd" cinema, hence the name. Originally, before World War II, it was an inner yard and an orchard of the Minh family but was confiscated by the new Communist authorities after the war. The Minhs planted linden and ginkgo trees, some of which were still existing as of 2023, forming a small botanical garden. The former screening section was left to the elements, with botched greenery and dilapidated concrete objects surviving.

Envisioned as the public green area by the 2003 city plan, the new administration changed this in 2016, repurposing the lot and planning to build residential buildings instead. Citizens signed petition against this, and self-organized to maintain the area before city took over. Residents continued to protest and in February 2023, both the municipality Zvezdara and the city of Belgrade stated that the plans will be changed in order to preserve Beograd Bašta as a green public space. This was confirmed in the new city plan in August 2023. New project, which is planned for 2024, includes arrangement of the 60% of the area as the square-park (0.24 ha (0.59 acres)) and reconstruction or rebuilding of the cinema screening seats.

The Minh family entered the process of restitution, asking for the return of the land.
