= Mali Mokri Lug =

Mali Mokri Lug Мали Мокри Луг
- Urban neighbourhood
- Location within Belgrade
- Coordinates: 44°46′N 20°32′E
- Country: Serbia
- Region: Belgrade
- Municipality: Zvezdara

Area
  - Total: 6.61 km^{2} (2.55 sq mi)
- Time zone: UTC+1 (CET)
  - Summer (DST): UTC+2 (CEST)
- Area code: +381(0)11
- Car plates: BG

Mali Mokri Lug (Serbian Cyrillic: Мали Мокри Луг) is an urban neighborhood of Belgrade, Serbia. It is located in the south-eastern section of Belgrade's municipality of Zvezdara. It marks the border with the municipality of Grocka. It mostly stretches between Bulevar kralja Aleksandra and the Highway Belgrade–Niš, but also north of the boulevard (Zeleno Brdo). It extends into the neighborhoods of Mirijevo on the north, Konjarnik on the west, Medaković III on the south-west, Veliki Mokri Lug on the south and Kaluđerica (in Grocka municipality) on the east.

== Geography ==
Mali Mokri Lug occupies the northern section of the Mokroluški potok valley, which is today used as a route for the Belgrade-Niš highway and divides Mali Mokri Lug and Veliki Mokri Lug. The neighborhood occupies the southern slopes of several hills (Bajdina, Zeleno Brdo, Stojčino Brdo with an altitude of 270 m or 886 ft), descending into the Mokroluški potok's valley, so the entire neighborhood is built downhill.

== History and administration ==
=== Antiquity ===
Belgrade's predecessor was a Celtic and Roman town of Singidunum. While the town's castrum occupied part of today's Belgrade Fortress, Singidunum's civilian zone spread from the modern Kralja Petra Street, over the both Sava and Danube slopes, till the neighborhood of Kosančićev Venac, extending in a series of necropolises from Republic Square, along the Bulevar kralja Aleksandra all the way to Mali Mokri Lug. One of the forts built by the Romans to protect the Via Militaris road, was Mutatio ad Sextum, on the location of modern neighborhood.

The Romans built an aqueduct to conduct water from the hill of Stojčino Brdo, sometime in the first half of the 1st century. It extended down the route Bulevar Kralja Aleksandra-Cvetkova Pijaca-Vojislava Ilića Street-Mileševska Street-Pioneers Park, into the castrum. Some parts of this waterworks system remained in use up to the 1870s. The water spring at Stojčino Brdo is still operational, and one of the reservoirs of the city's modern water supply system is located there.

=== Modern history ===
From 1929 to 1944, Mali Mokri Lug hosted a Buddhist temple built by the Kalmyk, refugees who had fought the Red Army in Russia and settled in Serbia, like many other White (Russian) refugees. This was the oldest permanent Buddhist temple in Europe outside of the Russian and British empires. Since most Kalmyks fled in fear of the advancing Red Army, Josip Broz Tito's partisans requisitioned the building, damaged in the fighting for Liberation of Belgrade, turned it into a community centre, but a few years later sold it to a machinery plant which pulled it down and built a concrete workshop in its stead.

Mali Mokri Lug used to be a separate village, outside Belgrade's urban zone. As Belgrade developed, with the construction of the large neighborhood of Konjarnik in the 1960s and 1970s and Mali Mokri Lug's rapid development as a suburb, it became part of the city's urban tissue and lost separate status after 1971, becoming a local community (mesna zajednica, sub-municipal administrative unit) within Belgrade city proper (uža teritorija grada). Mali Mokri Lug continued to grow and now makes the easternmost section of Belgrade's urban proper, developing further east along Bulevar kralja Aleksandra and Smederevski put, its continuation. With this growth, it now also makes continuous built-up area with formerly separate Veliki Mokri Lug (on the highway, at "Lasta" garage, at a tripoint with Kaluđerica's sub-neighborhood of Klenak at the bridge over the highway and with Kaluđerica directly along Smederevski put ).

Mali Mokri Lug had its own municipality in the 1950s. It was abolished on 1 January 1957 and merged into Zvezdara. It also comprised Kaluđerica, Leštane and Vinča which were later detached and annexed to the municipality of Grocka. Population of the municipality by the 1953 census was

In June 2017, a new community health center was opened.

== Population ==
According to the 2002 census of population, Mali Mokri Lug had 22,024 inhabitants. It had a population of 1,600 in 1921 and 10,378 in 1971, before it was attached to Belgrade. Its name can be translated into English as "little wet grove". Likewise, the neighboring Veliki Mokri Lug means "large wet grove". The name originates from the presence of numerous water sources, now mostly in the eastern section of Veliki Mokri Lug. Near the highway, a cemetery for both neighborhoods is located (Mokroluško groblje). The area is primarily residential, but a major commercial zone developed along Bulevar kralja Aleksandra, with many repair shops, stores, etc.

== Twin cities ==
- Burgas, Bulgaria
