= Nikola Vojinović (politician) =

Serbian politician

Nikola Vojinović (Serbian Cyrillic: Никола Војиновић; born 1985) is a politician in Serbia. He has served in the National Assembly of Serbia since 2020 as a member of the populist catch-all Serbian Progressive Party.

== Early life and career ==
Vojinović was born in Belgrade, in what was then the Socialist Republic of Serbia in the Socialist Federal Republic of Yugoslavia. He holds a Bachelor of Laws degree and earned a master's degree in management in 2012. He is a teaching associate at the Faculty of Business and Industrial Management in Belgrade and is the owner of the company Podrum Vojinović.

== Politician ==
=== Municipal politics ===
Vojinović received the sixth position on the Progressive Party's electoral list for the Zvezdara municipal assembly in the 2016 Serbian local elections and was elected when the list won twenty-two out of fifty-three seats. The Progressives became the dominant force in a local coalition government after the election, the Vojinović served as a government supporter in the assembly. On 18 November 2016, he was appointed as a member of the city council (i.e., the executive branch of the municipal government). He served in this position for the next four years and did not seek re-election to the assembly in 2020.

=== Parliamentarian ===
Vojinović was given the 182nd position on the Progressive Party's Aleksandar Vučić — For Our Children list in the 2020 Serbian parliamentary election and was elected when the list won a landslide majority with 188 out of 250 mandates. He is a member of the assembly committee on spatial planning, transport, infrastructure, and telecommunications; a deputy member of the committee on finance, state budget, and control of public spending; a deputy member of the committee on administrative, budgetary, mandate, and immunity issues; the head of Serbia's parliamentary friendship group with El Salvador; and a member of the parliamentary friendship groups with Denmark, France, Italy, Spain, and the United States of America.
