= Slavujev Venac =

Neighbourhood of Belgrade in Serbia

Coordinates: 44°48′20″N 20°29′13″E

Slavujev Venac (Serbian Cyrillic: Славујев Венац) is an urban neighborhood of Belgrade, the capital of Serbia. It is located in Belgrade's municipality of Zvezdara.

== Location ==
Historical population
Year	Pop.	±%
1981	5,620	—
1991	5,420	−3.6%
2002	5,509	+1.6%
2011	5,066	−8.0%

Slavujev Venac is located in the westernmost section of Zvezdara municipality, bordering the municipality of Palilula. It is located between the streets of Svetog Nikole on the north and Dimitrija Tucovića on the south and borders the neighborhoods of Bulbuder on the east, Vukov Spomenik on the south, Hadžipopovac (in Palilula) on the west and New Cemetery (Novo groblje) on the north (and Bogoslovija further).

== Characteristics ==
Slavujev Venac got its name after nightingales, which apparently were abundant in the area as the two nearby neighborhoods (Bulbuder and Slavujev Potok) are also named after them (Serbian slavuj, Turkish bülbül).

The creek which used to flow through the neighborhood has been conducted underground into the sewage system. It was named Slavujev potok or Bulbulderski potok and originated near the clinical center Zvezdara. It flew down in the direction of the moderns streets of Dimitrija Tucovića, Ruzveltova and Mije Kovačevića, before emptying into the Danube east of the present location of the Pančevo Bridge.

A small bridge was built over the creek in the 19th century, on the route of the modern Ruzveltova Street, on the western border of the neighborhood. Original wooden bridge was replaced with the stone one in 1929, and today there is a modern overpass. The bridge was replaced mainly to make easier access to the Belgrade New Cemetery, further down the Ruzveltova Street, Old bridge was often getting covered in ice during the winter and numerous accidents were recorded.

Originally, an overpass was built above the stream (modern overpass is part of the Ruzveltova Street). In time, the stream was conducted underground, into the sewage, and the underpass was turned into the traffic continuation between the Dimitrija Tucovića and Cvijićeva streets, forming a leveled intersection with the Ruzveltova and establishing a direct connection between the neighborhoods of Slavujev Potok and Hadžipopovac.

Local community of Slavujev Potok, which covers the neighborhood, had a population of 5,066 by the 2011 census.

The area is residential. In 2007, Belgrade city government confirmed that area remains scheduled for the individual residential (family) houses only, to prevent construction of high and large buildings so that area could preserve its historical looks.
