= Zvezdara II =

Urban neighborhood of Belgrade, Serbia

Coordinates: 44.806877°N 20.509573°E

Zvezdara II (Serbian Cyrillic: Звездара II) is an urban neighborhood of Belgrade, the capital of Serbia. It is located in the south-eastern section of Belgrade's municipality of Zvezdara.

Historical population
Year	Pop.	±%
1981	6,976	—
1991	6,592	−5.5%
2002	7,748	+17.5%
2011	6,129	−20.9%

A northern sub-neighborhood of Zvezdara, today mostly centered on the roundabout of bus line number 65. It consists of several small urban patches in the northern section of Zvezdara Forest, north of the observatory and Mihajlo Pupin Institute and along the Dragoslava Srejovića street, which divides it from the neighborhoods of Karaburma and Ćalije on the north and north-east, respectively, both in the municipality of Palilula.

Elementary school "1300 kaplara" was opened in 1961. The neighborhood includes the "Mihajlo Pupin Institute" and several small football stadiums, including FC 29. Novembar, FC Zvezdara, FC Mladi proleter and FC Bulbulderac.

Administratievlly, Zvezdara II constitutes the local community of "Severni Bulevar" within the municipality of Zvezdara. According to the 2011 census of population, it has 6,129 inhabitants.

In July 2017 city government announced the project of "Zvezdara promenade". It is supposed to be the 900 m (3,000 ft) long forested esplanade which would connect the Volgina street and the FC Mladi proleter stadium with the roundabout in the neighborhood of Bogoslovija. The promenade will have small squares and scenic viewpoints. It is part of the wider reconstruction of the area which would cover 35.18 ha (86.9 acres). The project includes the removal or reconstruction of many public buildings and companies but also a possibility of demolition of the small, residential houses with backyards and construction of the 5-storey buildings.
