= Crveni Krst, Belgrade =

Crveni Krst Црвени Крст
- Urban neighbourhood
- Location within Belgrade
- Coordinates: 44°47′48.28″N 20°29′18.04″E
- Country: Serbia
- Region: Belgrade
- Municipality: Vračar / Zvezdara
- Time zone: UTC+1 (CET)
  - Summer (DST): UTC+2 (CEST)
- Postal code: 11050
- Area code: +381(0)11
- Car plates: BG

Crveni Krst (Serbian Cyrillic: Црвени Крст, pronounced [tsrʋɛni kř̩ːst], "Red Cross") or colloquially just Krst (Крст, "Cross"), is an urban neighborhood of Belgrade, the capital of Serbia. It is located in Belgrade's municipalities of Vračar (larger part) and Zvezdara (part of Đeram).

== Location ==
Crveni Krst is located in the east-central part of the municipality of Vračar and west part of the municipality of Zvezdara, around the small square of the same name. It borders the neighborhoods of Čubura on the west, Kalenić on the north-west, Đeram on the north, Lipov Lad on the north-east, Obilić Stadium area on the east and Lekino Brdo on the south.

== History ==
The area of the modern Crveni Krst is in the eastern section of the Vračar field. In 1595 Ottoman grand vizier Sinan Pasha burned the relics of the major Serbian saint, Saint Sava, somewhere on the Vračar hill but after two centuries, the exact location was unknown. A majority of scholars agreed on a location on top of the hill, where the modern Cathedral of St Sava has recently been built. According to one version, reason why Serbian publisher Gligorije Vozarović (1790–1848) erected a wooden cross (Vozarev Cross) in the area was to mark what he thought was exact location. It is controversial since according to some historians, Saint Sava's relics weren't burned here, nor on the place where the Cathedral of Saint Sava was erected, but near the present-day Tašmajdan park.

Vozarović was a proprietor of the land where he erected the cross. According to the folk tradition, there was an old cross on this exact spot, commemorating the burning of the relics. The Vozarović's cross was embellished with the depictions of the Holly Trinity and Saint George, with inscription To God and people, Gligorije Vozarović 1847 in Vračar. He died the next year, and his widow Sara bequeathed the cross to the Palilula Church. The cross was renovated in 1895, 1923 and 1933 when the old, wooden cross, was replaced with the new one, made of stone, with inscription Vozarev's cross.

Another version says that reasons why he erected what is to become Belgrade's first public monument were more benevolent, it represented symbol of victory and liberation foreseeing nation's complete independence from crumbling Turkish Empire.

The emerging settlement around it gradually became known as Vozarov Krst ("Vozarov[ić]'s Cross"). The Association of Saint Sava later replaced the wooden cross with a new, red one and it gave the present name to the neighborhood (Crveni Krst, Serbian for "Red Cross"). Still, the modern local community (mesna zajedinca) of the municipality of Vračar which comprises the neighbourhood is officially styled Vozarev Krst (Vozarov and Vozarev i.e. adjectives ending in -ov/-ev are variant spellings like English -ise/-ize), with a population of 12,736 in 2002 (excluding the Zvezdara part).

In addition to Cross, two important sacral buildings in the neighbourhood are Orthodox Church of the Holy Protection of the Virgin and Roman Catholic Church of St Anthony.

Church of the Holy Protection of the Virgin was designed by famous architect Momir Korunović and built in 1932–33. It is basilical in plan, with a choir loft, side galleries, and a four-storey bell-tower above the narthex. Designed in the Byzantine tradition, it also shows Romanesque elements, especially in the architecture of the bell-tower. It has two side chapels which are dedicated to St Anthony and St Petka respectively.

Church of St Anthony was designed by Jože Plečnik of Vienna Sezession and built in 1928–32. It is one of few round churches and the only example of Vienna Sezession in Belgrade (there are several other buildings in the style of other Art Nouveau movements), and it has the only leaning tower/belfry in Belgrade, which is adjacent, but not actually attached, to the church building.

In 2003, city selected a conceptual layout plan for the section in front of the theater, but no works have been done. In 2020, city announced new plan for the entire square, which may incorporate the old plan. The roundabout and gas station are planned for relocation, and additional trees are to be planted. A garage with 200 lots is also planned, which may be underground, as the trees would have to be cut otherwise. Works are projected for 2022.

A small square at the corner of the Mileševska and Cara Nikolaja II streets has been renovated in 2021, and dedicated to the actors Milena Dravić and Dragan Nikolić, as mayor Zoran Radojičić stated that city "remembers its legends". The asphalt concrete which covered the area was removed, and the area was covered with granite slabs on top of the sand base. Additional trees were planted, and, as the married couple often performed together, a monument commemorating their TV show Obraz uz obraz will also be placed. The re-opening of the 850 square metres (9,100 sq ft) large square is scheduled for 14 October 2021, the monument will be placed by the spring of 2022, and in the same year the facades of the building around the square will be renovated. The square was officially named the Square of Milena and Gaga (Svker Milene i Gage) on 30 August 2021, and ceremonially opened on 4 October 2021. As the plan also includes demolition of Interbellum villas at the square, and construction of eight storey high modern buildings instead, citizens organized protests against the project which would completely change the cityscape of the square and add over 300 new residents.

Demolition of the existing venues of the Sports Society Radnički, and construction of the new complex, began in April 2023. Located in the block bounded by the streets Vojvode Šupljikca, Vatroslava Jagića, Starca Vujadina and Bulevar Kralja Aleksandra, the complex will cover 11,850 m^{2} (127,600 sq ft) above the ground, with additional 6,904 m^{2} (74,310 sq ft) below. Multi-functional venue will consist of two structures, the sports hall with a garage, named after basketball coach Duda Ivković, and the sports center with administration. The hall will have 1,025 seats, and the deadline for the project is mid-2025.

== Characteristics ==
Today, Crveni Krst is essentially an eastern extension of the neighborhood of Čubura and some city maps mark the area as Čubura, but the local community which covers Vračar portion of the area of Crveni Krst rivals the local community which covers the area of Čubura in population (12,736 to 13,498 in 2002, respectively). In fact, taken as a whole (including its Zvezdara portion), area of Crveni Krst probably exceeds it.

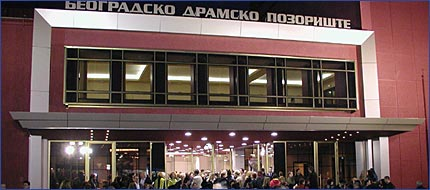
The main entrance to the Belgrade Drama Theater

The former small square, which comprises a minute park with the cross, was turned into the roundabout of the bus line 83 and trolleybus line 22L. Still, the square remains a crossroads of five streets: Mileševska, Vojvode Šupljikca, Branka Krsmanovića, Jovana Rajića and Žička. While just one bus line (83) goes through central part of the neighbourhood, five trolleybus lines do the same (lines 19, 21, 22, 22L and 29). On neighbourhood's southern fringe alongside South Boulevard, two additional bus lines are available (lines 46 and 55). On its northern fringe alongside King Alexander Boulevard, four tram lines are also available (lines 5, 6, 7 and 14) and future Line 1 of Belgrade light metro is planned to have its station there.

There is a small park in the Bregalnička Street, Open Air Cinema Park, which covers 0.24 hectares (0.59 acres).

The main feature in Crveni Krst is the large building of the Belgrade Drama Theater, opened in 1948 and completely reconstructed in 2003. All major domestic and foreign banks have their branches in Crveni Krst. Neighborhood is also home to famous basketball club Radnički which was national champion in 1973 and won national cup in 1976. Other important features are the complex of the Sports Center Vračar and Belgrade's Waterworks facilities.
