= Zvezdara =

Municipality in Belgrade, Serbia

Zvezdara Звездара (Serbian)
- Municipality
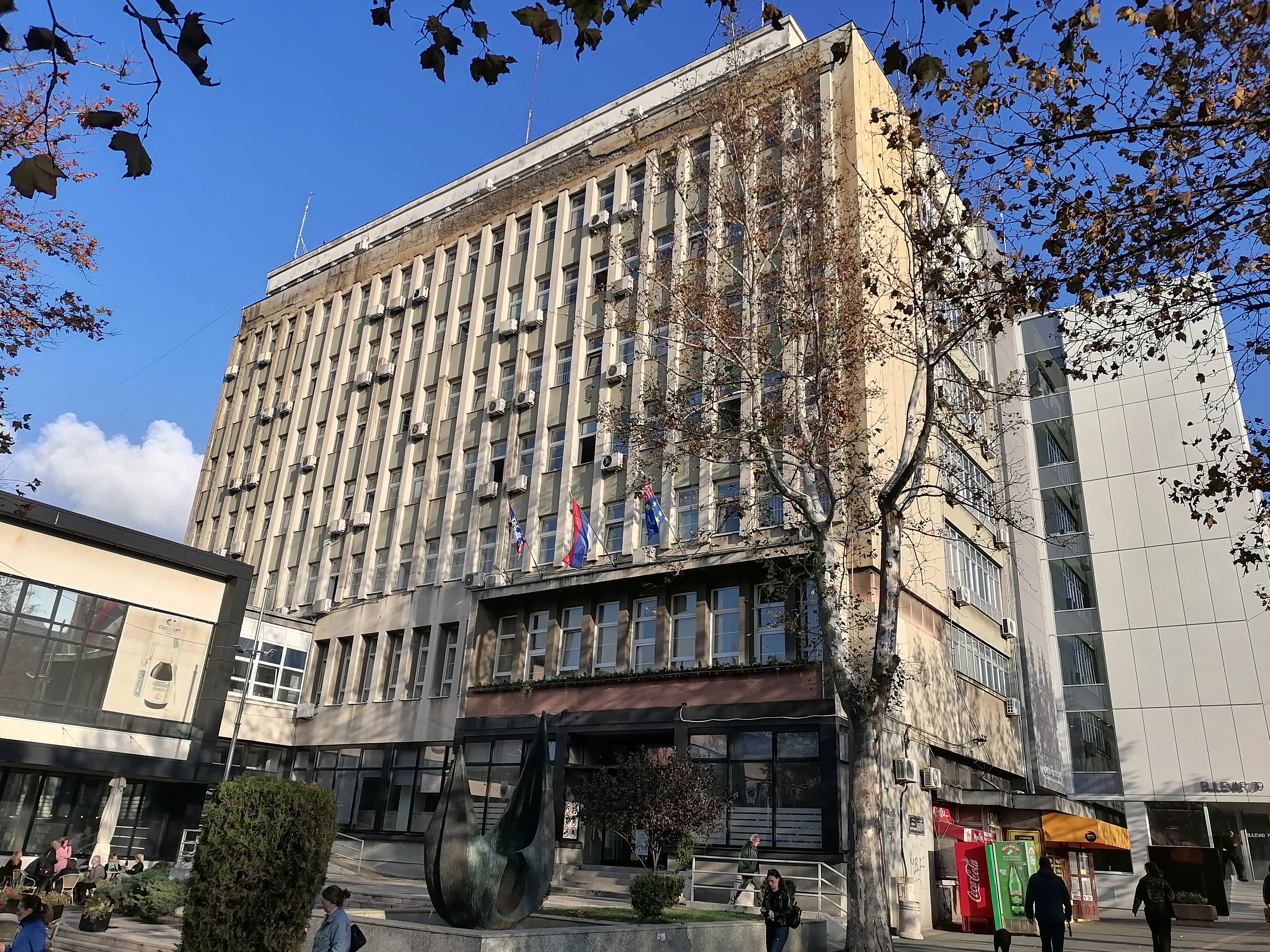

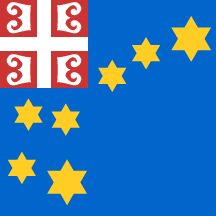
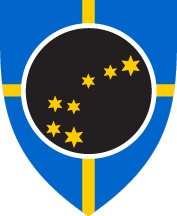
- Flag Coat of arms

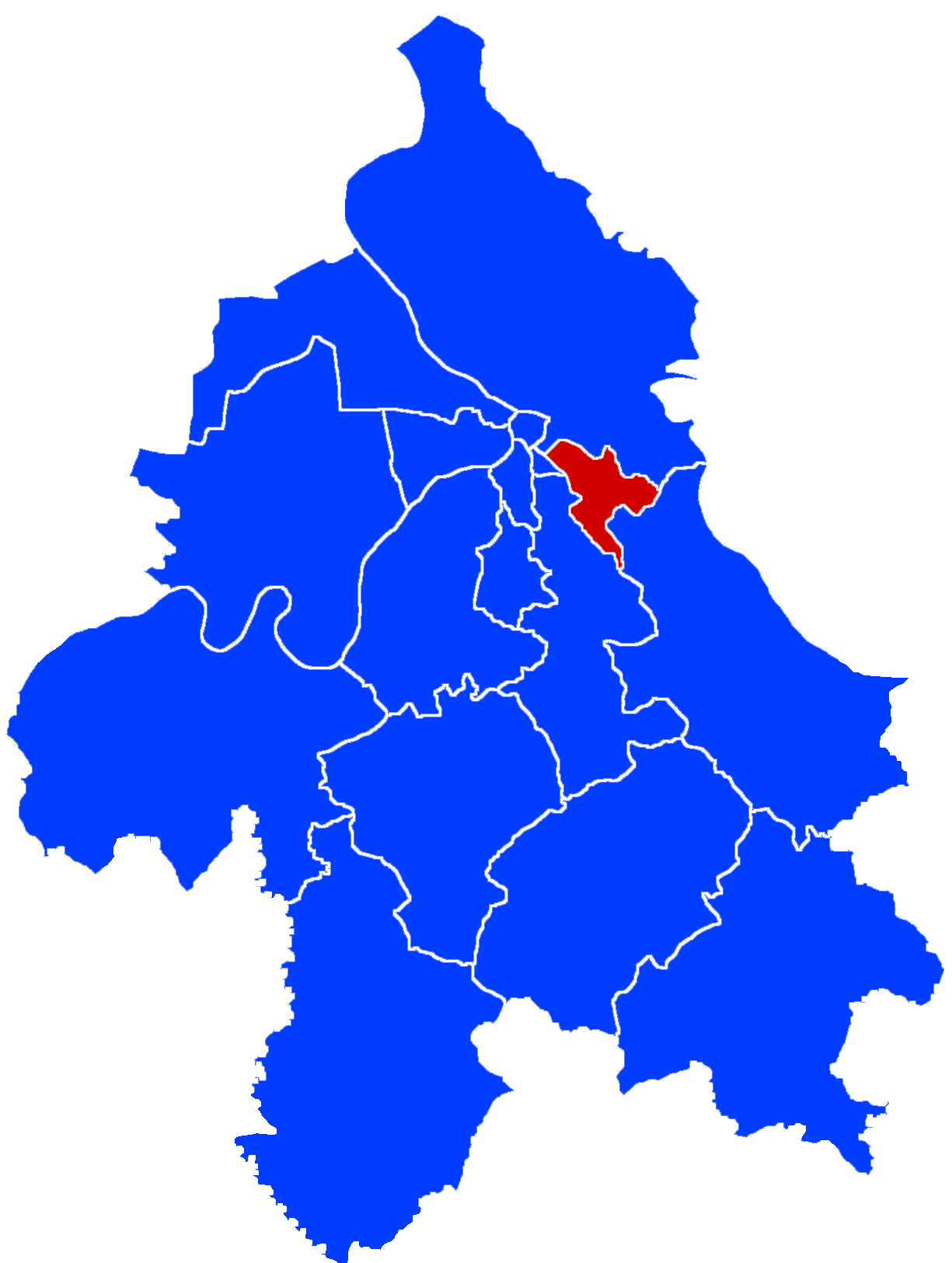
- Location of Zvezdara within the city of Belgrade
- Coordinates: 44°47′N 20°32′E
- Country: Serbia
- City: Belgrade
- Status: Urban
- Settlements: 1
- Municipality status: 1 September 1955

Government
  - Type: Municipality of Belgrade
  - Mun. president: Mihailo Dosković (SNS)

Area
  - Total: 31.11 km^{2} (12.01 sq mi)
- Elevation: 270 m (890 ft)

Population (2022)
  - Total: 172,625
  - Density: 5,526/km^{2} (14,310/sq mi)
- Time zone: UTC+1 (CET)
  - Summer (DST): UTC+2 (CEST)
- Postal code: 11000
- Area code: +381(0)11
- Car plates: BG
- Website: www.zvezdara.rs

Zvezdara (Serbian Cyrillic: Звездара, pronounced [zv̞ě̞zdara]) is a municipality of the city of Belgrade. The municipality is geographically hilly and with many forests. According to the 2022 census results, the municipality has a population of 172,625 inhabitants.

The municipality of Zvezdara is located east of Belgrade and occupied almost the entire eastern urban section of the city. It borders the municipalities of Palilula on the north-west, north and north-east, Grocka on the east and south-east, Voždovac on the south and south-west and Vračar on the west.

== History ==
Historically, Zvezdara hill was known as Great Vračar. Vračаr area at that time occupied much wider area that it does today and was divided into West Vračar, East Vračar and Great Vračar. Turkish source from 1621 describes it as "a hill and a big field". In the 17th and 18th century, the area was covered in vineyards, orchards and lush oriental gardens, a major excursion ground for the wealthy Belgrade Turks which called the hill Ekmekluk (Turkish ekmek, meaning bread) and built their summer houses there. The Ekmekluk occupied the slope which today spreads from the observatory to the Cvetko Market.

When Belgrade was occupied in 1717 by Austria, a defense moat was built whose outer section crossed the hill, where the modern Volgina street is today. After Austria re-occupied Belgrade in 1789, the trench was reconstructed by the general Ernst Gideon von Laudon and became known as the "Laudan trench" (Serbian: Laudanov šanac or simply Šanac). Due to the military importance of the hill, its gardens were neglected.

Until the 1930s, the Zvezdara hill was known as Veliki Vračar (Great Vračar). In the 19th century the foothills were not urbanized and, being far from the city center, were used by the Belgraders as a resort and picnic area, named Baba Ružin kraj ("Grandma Ruža's neighborhood"). In 1929-32 an observatory designed by Czech-born architect Jan Dubový (1892–1969) was built on top of the hill. The observatory was originally called zvezdara ("star-house") in Serbian, so the hill and the developing suburban area of Belgrade around it was named that way soon. In time, Latinism opservatorija replaced zvezdara, which in turn completely disappeared from spoken language as such, but remained as a name of Belgrade's neighborhood. As a result, many today believe Zvezdara was named that way simply after stars (Serbian zvezda, star). In 1935 the Clinical Center (KBC) Zvezdara was built as a bequest by wealthy Serbian merchant Nikola Spasić. The area was rich in water, originally used for city waterworks. Several public drinking fountains were built (like Pasha's fountain, dating from the First Serbian Uprising, in modern Živka Davidovića street or the Fountain of the third-class reservists, for the killed soldiers of the World War I. near KBC Zvezdara).

The KBC Zvezdara, which in time became known as the City Hospital Zvezdara, doubled its capacities already prior to World War II, expanding also number of wards. After the war it expanded capacities almost 8 times compared to December 1935, when it was opened and became one of the largest medical complexes in Serbia. Donation from the Sue Ryder charity in 1963, allowed the establishment of the first geriatrics ward in Yugoslavia.

The municipality of Zvezdara was created on 1 September 1955, from (at that time) new neighborhoods around the observatory. On 1 January 1957 Zvezdara was greatly enlarged as the municipalities of Stari Đeram and Mali Mokri Lug were annexed to it. Villages of Kaluđerica, Vinča and Leštane (previously parts of Mali Mokri Lug) were later detached and annexed to the municipality of Grocka. In the first half of the 1970s, all settlements in the municipality became part of the Belgrade city proper (uža teritorija grada) so the entire municipality of Zvezdara is today one of six municipalities which are completely part of urban Belgrade.

== Neighborhood ==
The Zvezdara neighborhood (44°48′00″N 20°30′29″E) is located south-east of downtown Belgrade. In its original sense, the neighborhood of Zvezdara comprises areas around the Zvezdara Forest, including the neighborhood of Zvezdara II. It borders the neighborhoods of Bogoslovija and Karaburma on the north, Ćalije on the north-east (all in the municipality of Palilula), Mirijevo on the east, Mali Mokri Lug on the south-east, Cvetkova Pijaca and Konjarnik on the south, Lion on the south-west and Bulbuder on the west. The area had a population of 10,095 by the 2002 census of population. However, after the creation of the municipality in 1955, the entire section west and south-west of Zvezdara is today considered as part of it in a narrow sense (Lion, Bulbuder, Lipov Lad, Cvetkova Pijaca, etc.).

This is a list of neighborhoods in the municipality:

- Bulbulder
- Crveni Krst
- Cvetanova Ćuprija
  - Denkova Bašta
- Đeram
- Konjarnik
- Konjarnik I
- Konjarnik II
- Konjarnik III
- Lion
- Lipov Lad
- Mali Mokri Lug
- Mirijevo
- Mirijevo II
- Mirijevo III
- Mirijevo IV
- Novo Mirijevo
- Orlovsko Naselje
- Padina
- Rudo
- Slavujev Venac
- Stari Đeram
- Staro Mirijevo
- Učiteljsko Naselje
- Veliki Mokri Lug
- Vukov Spomenik
- Zeleno Brdo
- Olimp
- Kaluđerica II
- Zvezdara II

== Geography ==
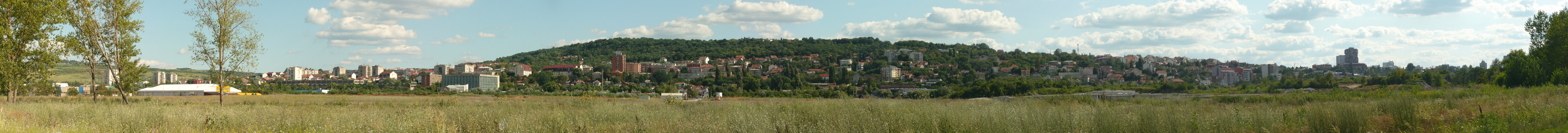
Panorama of the hill, from north. Karaburma is in the foreground.

Despite being one of Belgrade's minor municipalities in terms of area (31 square kilometer), Zvezdara covers some of the highest sections of urban Belgrade, including the hills:

- Stojčino Brdo (270 meters)
- Orlovica (265 meters, also, but incorrectly, named Orlovača on some city maps)
- Zvezdara (253 meters)
- Mokroluško Brdo (234 meters)

Zvezdara basically has no real city parks, but has two large wooded areas, Zvezdara Forest (with an arranged park within, in the north-central part) and the northern section of Stepin Lug in the southern part of the municipality. Peti Park (Fifth park) is a minute green area in the neighborhood of Lipov Lad which gained a lot of publicity in the mid-2000s with a public movement to keep the area green.

Zvezdara does not come out on the river banks of two major Belgrade's rivers (the Danube and Sava). The major water flows in the municipality are two creeks, both of which are partially conducted underground in the city sewer: Mokroluški potok and Mirijevski potok. For several hundred meters, the Bolečica river flows through the southernmost part of the municipality, near Bubanj Potok.

== Demographics ==
Historical population
Year	Pop.	±% p.a.
1948	56,177	—
1953	66,580	+3.46%
1961	88,919	+3.68%
1971	112,938	+2.42%
1981	128,573	+1.31%
1991	140,483	+0.89%
2002	132,621	−0.52%
2011	151,808	+1.51%
2022	172,625	+1.18%

According to the 2022 census results, the municipality has a population of 172,625 inhabitants. The population of the municipality had a steady, large growth until the 1990s when birthrates plunged in all of Serbia due to the Yugoslav Wars. Zvezdara remains one of the most densely populated areas in entire Serbia, with 4,897 inhabitants per square kilometer as of 2011.

=== Ethnic groups ===
The ethnic composition of the municipality (as of 2022):

Ethnic group	Population	Percent
Serbs	147,476	85.43%
Romani	1,590	0.92%
Yugoslavs	1,013	0.59%
Montenegrins	607	0.35%
Russians	591	0.34%
Macedonians	415	0.24%
Croats	361	0.21%
Gorani	336	0.19%
Muslims	224	0.13%
Bosniaks	186	0.11%
Hungarians	160	0.09%
Bulgarians	108	0.06%
Slovenians	86	0.05%
Romanians	65	0.04%
Slovaks	62	0.04%
Albanians	37	0.02%
Others	1,094	0.6%
Undeclared/Unknown	18,279	10.59%
Total	172,625	

== Administration ==
Recent Presidents of the municipality were:

- 1996–2000: Vučeta Mandić
- 2000–November 19, 2004: Petar Moravac (b. 1964)
- November 19, 2004 – February 18, 2005: Milan Popović (b. 1948)
- February 18, 2005 – June 28, 2005: Ljubiša Stojmirović (b. 1950)
- June 28, 2005 – June 11, 2012: Milan Popović (b. 1948)
- June 11, 2012 – June 1, 2016: Edip Šerifov (b. 1977)
- June 1, 2016 – September 4, 2020: Miloš Ignjatović (b. 1961)
- September 4, 2020 – present: Vladan Jeremić (b. 1974)

== Culture and society ==
Educational and research facilities:

- leading ICT researchers, Mihajlo Pupin Institute
- Zvezdara observatory
- Belgrade Business School
- Republic Bureau of Statistics
- VI Belgrade Gymnasium
- Technical school for Geodesy and Surveying
- Technical College of Vocational Studies for Civil Engineering and Surveying
- Nursing school
- Medical center (KBC Zvezdara)
- City hospital (Gradska bolnica)
- Anti-tuberculosis hospital

Theaters:

- Tetar Kult
- Zvezdara Teatar

Churches:

- Shroud of the Holy Mother of God (Đeram); former industrial object, adapted into church by Momir Korunović in 1933;
- Saint Prince Lazar (Bulbulder); also built by Korunović;
- Saint Trifon (Mali Mokri Lug)
- Saint Prophet Elias (Mirijevo)
- Saint Father Nikolay (New Cemetery)

Sports:

- Stadium FK Hajduk Beograd
- Stadium FK Zvezdara
- Stadium FK Balkan Bukovica
- Stadium FK 29. November
- Stadium FK Mladi Proleter
- Sports center "Zvedara" (popularly styled "Olimp")

== Economy ==
The following table gives a preview of total number of registered people employed in legal entities per their core activity (as of 2022):

Activity	Total
Agriculture, forestry and fishing	97
Mining and quarrying	14
Manufacturing	3,720
Electricity, gas, steam and air conditioning supply	325
Water supply; sewerage, waste management and remediation activities	1,810
Construction	4,859
Wholesale and retail trade, repair of motor vehicles and motorcycles	9,037
Transportation and storage	3,595
Accommodation and food services	2,113
Information and communication	3,041
Financial and insurance activities	845
Real estate activities	343
Professional, scientific and technical activities	4,543
Administrative and support service activities	3,766
Public administration and defense; compulsory social security	2,618
Education	4,175
Human health and social work activities	3,042
Arts, entertainment and recreation	972
Other service activities	1,931
Individual agricultural workers	25
Total	50,870

=== Industry ===
As many areas of modern Zvezdara municipalities were villages and rural areas annexed to it in the 1950s, entire southern and eastern sections (Padina, Veliki Mokri Lug, Mali Mokri Lug, Mirijevo) are without industry. Industrial facilities are mostly grouped in two sections: Konjarnik (plastics Bukulja, precise and optical instruments Precizna mehanika, white metals Metal) and upper Bulevar kralja Aleksandra section (textile Kluz, electronics Nikola Tesla, plastics Utenzilija, presses Glas Javnosti and Kurir, foundry Livnica).

=== Commerce ===
As most of the Bulevar kralja Aleksandra goes through the municipality of Zvezdara, one of the strongest commercial zones in Belgrade developed around this, the longest street in the old section of Belgrade (9 kilometers). The long zone along the boulevard, simply known as "Bulevar" (despite there are some 20 boulevards in Belgrade), apart from several dozens of shops of all kinds, hosted also hundreds of street sellers, which are now confined to the large covered fair-type store named "Depo" ("depot").

=== Transportation ===
Some of the busiest streets in Belgrade pass through the municipality of Zvezdara. Basically, the main street that goes through the central part of the entire municipality is Bulevar kralja Aleksandra which continues through the municipality of Grocka to the town of Smederevo. Additionally, in almost parallel way, the Highway Belgrade–Niš goes through the southern part. Ruzveltova and Mije Kovačevića in the eastern section are among the busiest and most polluted traffic areas in the city. Other major city routes include streets Vojislava Ilića, Ustanička, Dimitrija Tucovića, Dragoslava Srejovića, Milana Rakića, Jovanke Radaković, Mirijevski venac and Matice Srpske. The large bus garage depot of GSP Belgrade, city's public transportation company and Lasta, its sister company, are located on the highway.

There is no railroad passing through the municipality, but Vukov Spomenik is one of the underground train stations of the future Belgrade Metro, which for now operates as part of the Belgrade-Pančevo railway (local "BG Voz" suburban rail), connecting Nova Pazova (in the province of Vojvodina), Belgrade and Pančevo (in Vojvodina again).

=== Zvezdara II ===
A northern sub-neighborhood of Zvezdara, today mostly centered on the roundabout of bus line number 65. It consists of several small urban patches in the northern section of Zvezdara Forest, north of the observatory and Mihajlo Pupin Institute and along the Dragoslava Srejovića street, which divides it from the neighborhoods of Karaburma and Ćalije on the north and north-east, respectively, both in the municipality of Palilula.

=== Zvezdara Forest ===
Zvezdara Forest (Zvezdarska šuma or Zvezdani Gaj, Serbian Cyrillic: Звездарска шума or Звездани гај) After Topčider and Košutnjak, Zvezdara is the largest forest in the urban zone of Belgrade, a crescent-shaped wooded area which covers most of the Zvezdara Hill. The northern and eastern border of the wood is formed mostly by the Dragoslava Srejovića street. It borders the neighborhoods of Karaburma on the north, Ćalije on the north-east, Mirijevo on the east, Cvetkova Pijaca on the south and Zvezdara itself on the west.

In the beginning of the 20th century the Veliki Vračar Hill area was designed for afforestation. After the construction of the observatory in 1929-32 on top of the hill, the forest creation began making a unique artificially created green zone in Belgrade's urban tissue. Today, the observatory is roughly in the middle of the forest.

The Zvezdara Forest today covers an area of 137 hectares, out of which 21 hectare is arranged as a park. Apart from the observatory, objects within the forest or near it include the "Mihajlo Pupin Institute" in the north-central and seven small stadiums (FC 29. Novembar, FC Zvezdara, FC Mladi proleter) in the north-western section. Patches of the northern section are urbanized, forming a neighborhood of Zvezdara II (especially along the Dragoslava Srejovića street). The forest is also damaged by the unauthorized individual residential construction, so in 2007 Belgrade City government announced further plans to extend the Zvezdara Forest to the north and south, connecting it in the process to Ada Huja and Šumice, respectively, either as real park or just avenues, and thus creating Belgrade's greenway.

Number of animal species protected by Serbian and international laws live in Zvezdara forest. Some of them are:

- East European hedgehog (Latin Erinaceus concolor; Serbian: evropski belogrudi jež)
- European mole (Lat. Talpa europaea; Serbian: krtica)
- Common buzzard (Lat. Buteo buteo; Serbian: mišar)
- Tawny owl (Lat. Strix aluco; Serbian: šumska sova)
- Long-eared owl (Lat. Asio otus; Serbian: mala ušara)
- Scops owl (Lat. Otus scops; Serbian: ćuk)
- Little owl (Lat. Athene noctua; Serbian: kukumavka)

== International cooperation ==
Zvezdara is twinned with the following cities and municipalities:

- Kisela Voda, North Macedonia

Honoring this cooperation, one street between Zvezdara and Mirijevo was named "Kisela Voda" in the mid-2000s.

== See also ==
- Subdivisions of Belgrade
- List of Belgrade neighborhoods and suburbs
