= Bulbulder =

Bulbulder Булбулдер
- Urban neighbourhood
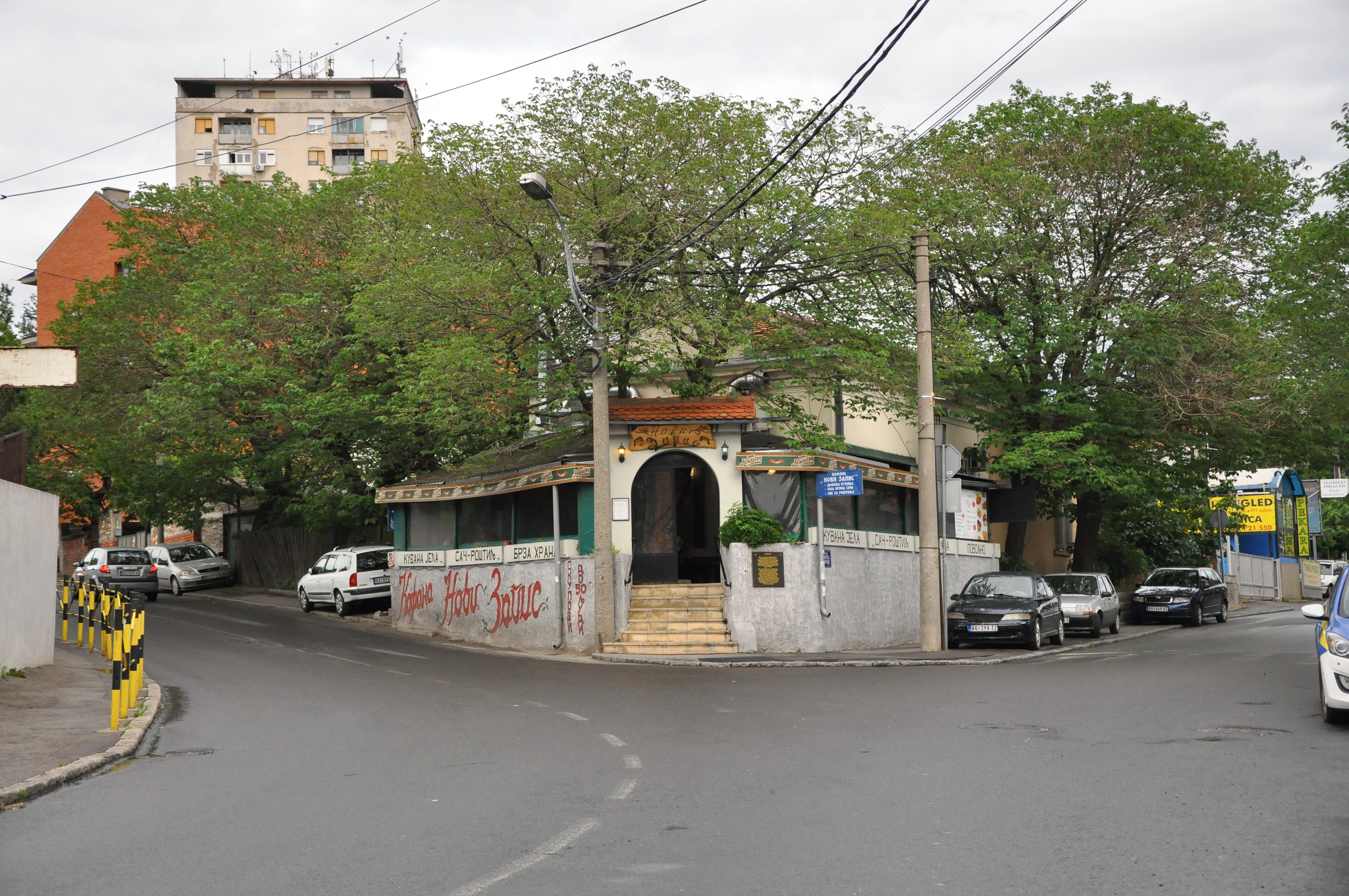
- Bulbulder

- Location within Belgrade
- Coordinates: 44°48′17″N 20°29′22″E
- Country: Serbia
- District: Belgrade
- Municipality: Zvezdara

Population (2011)
  - Total: 10,441
- Time zone: UTC+1 (CET)
  - Summer (DST): UTC+2 (CEST)

Bulbulder (Serbian Cyrillic: Булбулдер; often erroneously Bulbuder, Serbian Cyrillic: Булбудер) is an urban neighborhood of Belgrade, the capital of Serbia. It is located in Belgrade's municipality of Zvezdara.

== Location ==
Bulbulder is located in the western section of Zvezdara municipality, some 2.5 kilometers east from downtown Belgrade (Terazije). It spreads mostly between the streets of Dimitrija Tucovića on the south and Svetog Nikole on the north. It borders the neighborhood of Đeram on the south, Slavujev Venac on the west, Belgrade New Cemetery on the north-west, Zvezdara II on the north and Zvezdara itself on the east.

== Name ==
The neighborhood's name means "nightingale valley" and comes from Turkish words bülbül, nightingale, and dere, valley. Apparently, the entire surrounding area was populated by nightingales, as the neighboring areas are called Slavujev Venac and Slavujev Potok (Serbian for "nightingale's rim" and "nightingale's creek", respectively).

== History ==
=== Pre-19th century ===
In the 17th century. the Ottomans built a water supply system in the area, the Bulbulder waterworks. It was made from the short, baked-earth pipes (čunak). In the 18th century, Austrian occupational administration built the Town's waterworks. With the oldest, Mokri Lug waterworks, all three merged into the single system, which converged under the Terazije, where the water separating reservoir was built.

When Belgrade was occupied in 1717 by the Austria, a defense moat was built whose outer section crossed the Veliki Vračar hill, where the modern Volgina Street is today. After Austria re-occupied Belgrade in 1789, the trench was reconstructed by the general Ernst Gideon von Laudon and became known as the "Laudan's trench" (Serbian: Laudanov šanac or simply Šanac). When Bulbulder developed later, this marked its easternmost extension, becoming known as the Baba Ruža's End.

Chronicler Milan Milićević noted that during this Austrian occupation, Bulbulder for Belgraders had the function which in the early 1900s had Topčider: a green, forested excursion area just outside of the city. Also, it was the marketplace where more "exotic" goods could be purchased, like the "figs from the (Adriatic) sea" and "grapes from Mostar".

=== 19th century ===
The creek which used to flow through the neighborhood has been conducted underground into the sewage system. It was named Slavujev potok or Bulbulderski potok (Slavuj or Bulbulder Creek) and originated near the clinical center Zvezdara. It flew down in the direction of the moderns streets of Dimitrija Tucovića, Ruzveltova and Mije Kovačevića, before emptying into the Danube east of the present location of the Pančevo Bridge. At the modern corner of the Cvijićeva and Zdravka Čelara, there was a widening, where the creek would overspill and the pond would form. Local population came to the pond for harvesting reeds and shooting ducks. Historically, until World War I term Bulbulder was applied to the much wider area than the modern local community covers. It included the entire valley of the Bulbulder Creek with the Veliki Vračar hill, especially its right bank which would today also include Zvezdara Forest, Slavujev Venac, Slavujev Potok, Hadžipopovac and Profesorska Kolonija. In the 19th century, the upper section of the neighborhood had a string of brickworks which used the local clay.

Major changes ensued after 1886 and construction of the Belgrade New Cemetery in the neighborhood. The main street which connected the neighborhood to the rest of Belgrade, Grobljanski Put (Cemetery Road, later street; renamed to Ruzveltova in 1946) became much busier. In 1893, a tram line of public transportation was conducted through the street. Originally assigned No. 3, it was later changed to No. 8 and in 1949 it became No. 13. Because of this, a small bridge was built over the creek in the 19th century, on the route of the modern Ruzveltova Street, on the western border of the neighborhood, in the Slavujev Venac section. Original wooden bridge was replaced with the stone one in 1929, and today there is a modern overpass. The bridge was replaced mainly to make easier access to the cemetery, further down the Ruzveltova Street. Old bridge was often getting covered in ice during the winter and numerous accidents were recorded.

=== 20th century ===
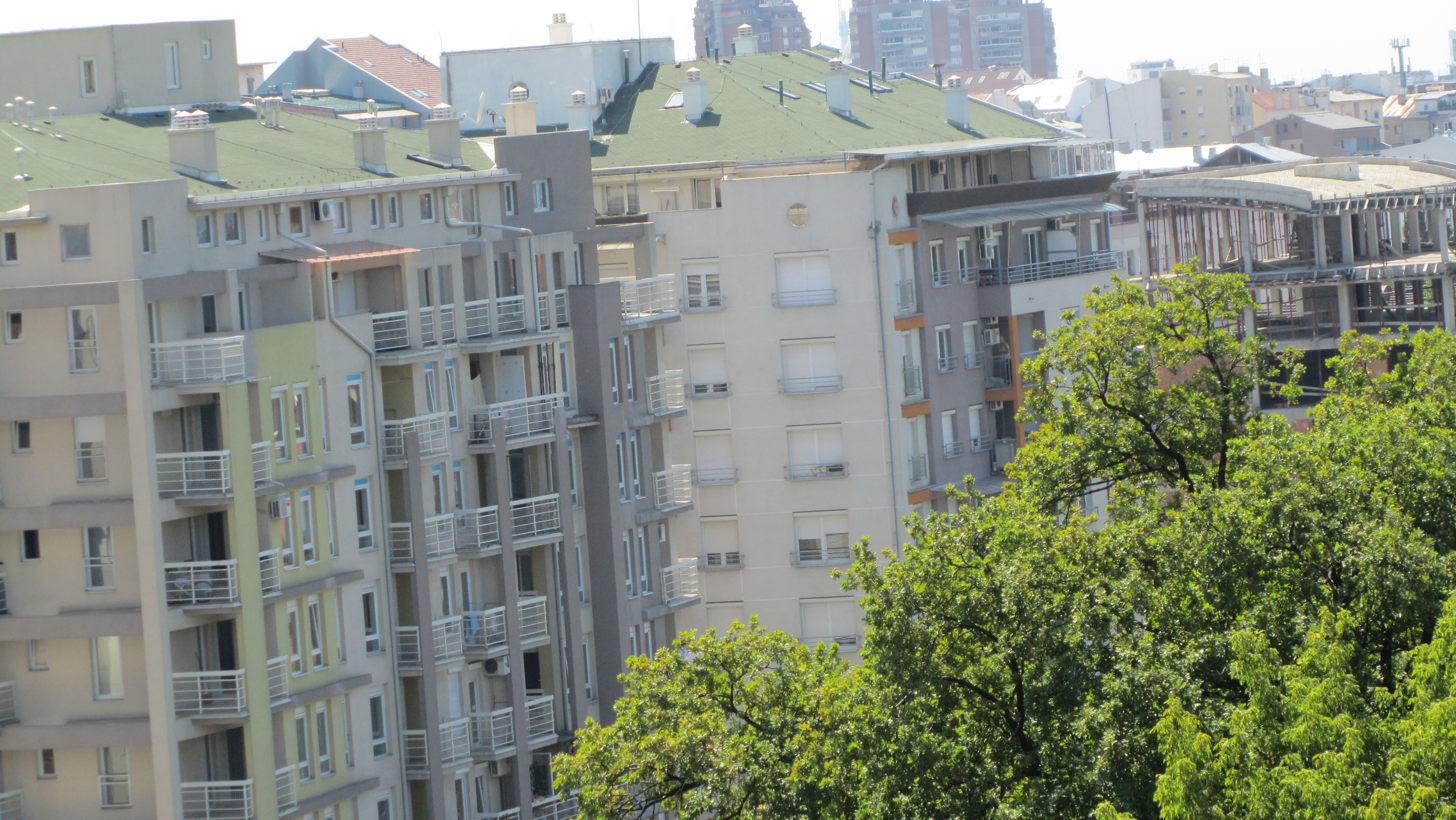
Modern highrise along the Dimitrija Tucovića Street

In the 19th and early 20th century, the area consisted of yards and gardens. Bulgarian settlers were cultivating vegetables, which was then directly sold on the wooden benches in front of the gardens. The settlement changed after the city cemetery was transferred from Tašmajdan to the northern section of the neighborhood as the Belgrade New Cemetery. The gardeners were transferred to Mirijevo, the creek was channeled and the construction of the houses began. On 15 July 1915, during the standstill in World War I, the drinking fountain was built at the spring of the Bulbulder Creek. It was dedicated to, and named after, the third-class reservists (Trećepozivačka česma). After the war ended, the quick development of the neighborhood ensued.

From 1926 to 1927, a new residential neighborhood was built in the area bounded by the streets of Knez Miletina (today Despota Stefana Boulevard), Mitropolita Petra and Zdravka Čelara, and bz the Bulbulder Creek. One section was settled by the families of the Belgrade University professors and became a separate neighborhood of Profesorska Kolonija. However, the creek continued to flood the area, especially after heavy rains, cutting off the neighborhood completely from downtown. The drainage network was constructed and the creek was conducted underground by 1933. The second most important street in the neighborhood, opposite to the Grobljanska, was cut through by this time, too. Northern section, to the Đušina Street, was named Slavujska, while the southern was named Bulbulderska. Name change was proposed for the northern section which reached Profesorksa Kolonija, so it was renamed to Cvijićeva, after the professor and scientist Jovan Cvijić.

The southern section was also renamed, to Tucovićeva (today Dimitrija Tucovića). Two main streets were meeting, but not crossing each other, being cut off from each other by the overpass. Works on the overpass, which allowed the crossing, were finished in December 1930. In 1927, the bus line of public transportation was established, which connected Profesorska Kolonija section with the Belgrade Main railway station. In the extreme east, on the Veliki Vračar hill, the Belgrade Observatory was built from 1929 to 1932. After the original Serbian name for the observatory, zvezdara (zvezda, star in Serbian) the hill and the entire neighborhood, and today municipality, are named Zvezdara. The hill was heavily forested and today is protected as the natural monument of Zvezdara Forest.

After World War I, a whole string of new or expanded neighborhoods encircled eastern outskirts of Belgrade, with names usually containing "suburb" and some member of the royal family. These original names either never became popular or were suppressed after World War II and replaced. The inspiration for the design of the neighborhoods came from the complex built in 1912 along the Daviel Street in Paris. It consisted of 40 one-floor houses with gardens, indented from the main street. This style became very popular across the Europe. One such suburb was built in Buldudber, under the name Suburb of Unknown Hero.

By the 1930s, Bulbulder was fully integrated into the urban tissue of Belgrade. Industrialist Luka Milišić built a social housing block in Bulbulder during the Interbellum. He built it for the workers of his brickyard and the acetic acid factory. In this period, at 35 Grobljanska Street, the bus company of Ljubiša Perišić, which maintained the bus line in the neighborhood, built vast garage for its vehicles. It later became known as the Ford Garage. Construction of the City Hospital (today KBC Zvezdara) lasted from October 1933 to 1 December 1935. In the early 1941, before World War II began in Yugoslavia, the bus line No. 28 was established, which connected City Hospital to Theatre Square in downtown Belgrade. The Ford Garage was burned by the members of Communist youth organization SKOJ in the night of 26/27 July 1941, as the occupational German forces kept parked vehicles here. The line No. 28 was kept operational by the German authorities throughout the war, from 1941 to 1944.

The last major flood occurred on 11 September 1967, when entire city was engulfed in the major, catastrophic hailstorm. The torrent was carrying trees, rocks and cars, even the bus on the line No. 28. Some of the smaller debrees and objects were carried for hundreds of meters. Downhill, the Cvijićeva Street "ceased to exist for a while", becoming a proper stream like it was before the urbanization.

== Population ==
Historical population
Year	Pop.	±%
1981	9,772	—
1991	8,923	−8.7%
2002	10,946	+22.7%
2011	10,441	−4.6%

City was divided in several zones in 1932, for operational purposes. Bulbulder, as part of the outer city zone at the time, was estimated to have 20,000 residents. The neighborhood is mostly residential. According to the 2011 census, the population of the local community of the same name was 5,375, while with the local community of Slavujev Venac, population was 10,441.

== Characteristics ==
Bulbulder is a working-class neighborhood which mostly consists of old, individual houses with yards and orchards (cherries, apricots). In the 2010s, especially along the Dimitrija Tucovića, old houses were demolished and new, tall buildings constructed. The neighborhood is known for its pigeonries and for the number of athletes and trainers who grew up in the area: Vladimir Petrović Pižon, Vladislav Bogićević, Dušan Nikolić, Dragoslav Stepanović, Petar Borota, Zoran Dimitrijević, Boško Kajganić (football), Jovica Cvetković, Milan Kalina (handball), Nebojša Prokić (boxing), Ljubomir Vračarević (Real Aikido), Jelena Janković (tennis).

A large medical complex (KBC "Zvezdara", Anti-tuberculosis Clinic, etc.) is at the eastern end of the neighborhood, while the Orthodox church of Saint Prince Lazar is in the center. The church, colloquially called Lazarica, and the nearby street of Mehmed Paše Sokolovića, are considered as the center of the neighborhood.
