= Konjarnik =

Konjarnik Коњарник
- Urban neighbourhood
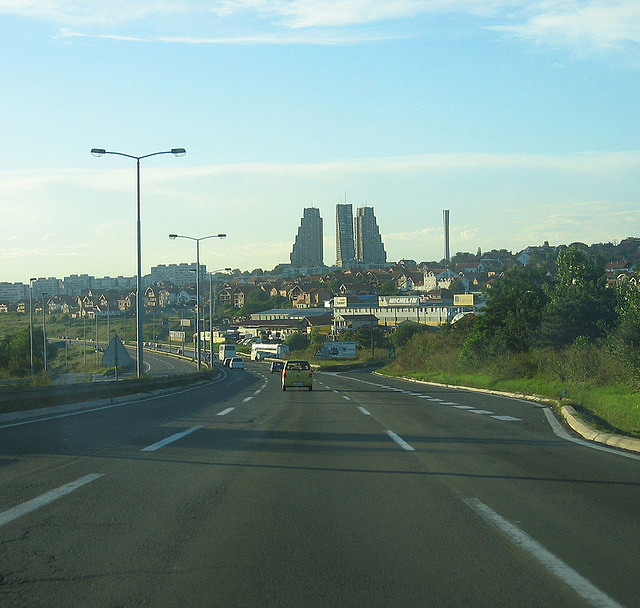

- Location within Belgrade
- Coordinates: 44°47′N 20°30′E
- Country: Serbia
- Region: Belgrade
- Municipality: Voždovac / Zvezdara

Population (2011)
  - Total: 22,973
- Time zone: UTC+1 (CET)
  - Summer (DST): UTC+2 (CEST)
- Area code: +381(0)11
- Car plates: BG

Konjarnik (Serbian Cyrillic: Коњарник, pronounced [kɔ̌ɲaːrniːk]) is an urban neighborhood of Belgrade, the capital of Serbia. It is divided between Belgrade's municipalities of Voždovac and Zvezdara (roughly Konjarnik I, Konjarnik II and Konjarnik III, respectively). As a large neighborhood, it has several sub-neighborhoods of its own, including Denkova Bašta, Učiteljsko Naselje and Rudo.

== Location ==
Konjarnik begins 4 km south-east of downtown Belgrade (Terazije) and itself stretched for over 2 km, mostly along Ustanička street, right side of the Highway Belgrade–Niš and between Ustanička and Vojislava Ilića streets. It borders the neighborhoods of Dušanovac on the west, Šumice on the south-west, Cvetkova Pijaca on the north, Mali Mokri Lug on the east, while the entire southern border of Konjarnik is marked by the highway which divides it from the neighborhoods of Medaković III and Marinkova Bara. Westernmost section of Konjarnik belongs to the municipality of Voždovac, the rest is in Zvezdara.

== History ==
After World War I, part of the neighborhood of Cvetkova Pijaca was settled by the Kalmyks from the shores of the Caspian Sea, which fled Imperial Russia after the October Revolution in 1917. In Budvanska street, they built Belgrade pagoda, a Mongolian-type Buddhist temple in 1929, which was abandoned in 1944 and demolished in the mid-1960s. They had vast horse herds which were kept and left to graze in the open area which gradually became known as Konjarnik (literally, horse breeding area). Building of a vast, modern neighborhood began in 1960s and continued in the 1970s, creating an urban connection between old Belgrade on the west and Mali Mokri Lug on the east. Population of Konjarnik was 23,394 in 2002 and 22,973 in 2011.

== Characteristic ==
Heating plant "Konjarnik" is one of the largest in the city. In connection with the expansion and complete rearrangement of the Belgrade's central landfill, Vinča, a construction of the 9 km (5.6 mi) long heating pipeline between the landfill and Konjarnik began in 2020. The plant will use heat produced by the waste incineration which should boost plant's power by 20%. Works should be finished by the end of 2021.

== Sub-neighborhoods ==
=== Konjarnik I ===
Westernmost section of Konjarnik, located in the municipality of Voždovac, between the streets of Ustanička on the north, Belgrade-Niš highway on the south and Vojislava Ilića on the east. It extends into the neighborhood of Dušanovac on the west and borders Šumice park on the north and Marinkova Bara on the south, across the highway. The area is, like the rest of Konjarnik, characterized by large, rectangular-shaped residential buildings. One of the major centers of Belgrade police, in Ljermontova street, is located in the neighborhood, and so is a new residential-commercial complex of KoŠum and a residential building Testera (Serbian for saw), because of its zig-zag construction. Green, forest belt separates the neighborhood from the highway.

Along the highway is the elongated Autoput Forest, which covers 2.13 hectares (5.3 acres).

=== Konjarnik II ===
Section of Konjarnik east of Vojislava Ilića street, with Ustanička as central street. Apart from many large residential buildings, it has an industrial zone, along the Vojislava Ilića and Mis Irbijeve streets (factories of "Precizna mehanika", "Bukulja", "Metal") and a developing commercial zones along the roundabout of the "Lasta" bus lines on the crossroads of the Ustanička and Vojislava Ilića streets.

The entire neighborhood is built on the slope. When the industrial halls were built in the 1970s, especially during the construction of "Bukulja" plastics factory, due to the improper digging into the slope the mass wasting was triggered. It was stopped in 1980-1981, when the supporting constructions were built into the ground.

Industrial facilities and factories went bankrupt by the 2010s, some were demolished, and the new commercial cluster developed instead. It includes the Vero supermarket Super Vero 2, opened in 2004, and Lidl supermarket, opened in 2018. Also in 2018, construction of the vast shopping mall at the corner of the Vojislava Ilića and Mis Irbijeve began. The mall, with the total floor area of 130,000 m^{2} (1,400,000 sq ft), was opened on 26 June 2020. Named "BEO Shopping Center" it occupies the lot of the former "Precizna Mehanika" factory. On the opening, it was the sixth shopping mall in Belgrade, but by the sheer size of the floor area, equaled the "Ušće Shopping Center" as the largest in the city.

=== Konjarnik III ===
Part of Konjarnik north and east of the final section of Ustanička street. It has commercial zones along the roundabout of the bus lines 17, 31 and trolleybus line 19. Two shopping malls, both named "Konjarnik" (old and new, one across another) are also located in Ustanička.

=== Učiteljsko Naselje ===
Učiteljsko Naselje (Учитељско насеље; "teachers' settlement") is located in the central part of Konjarnik II, centered on the Učiteljska street and the roundabout of the trolleybus line 21, just east of the industrial zone. Also the location of the former Buddhist temple. Residential area, with a population of 9,516 by the 2002 census. and 10,316 in 2011.

Učiteljsko naselje is located 3.5 km from Terazije square and just some meters down from Bulevar Kralja Aleksandra street. Elementary school Ćirilo i Metodije is the famous building and the kids from neighbourhood go there in school. Main connection with center is trolleybus line 21. This is a central part of Zvezdara municipality, main street is Učiteljska. Učiteljsko naselje has famous people living or lived there, folk-pop-dance singer Ivan Gavrilović, murdered opposition journalist Slavko Ćuruvija, actress Snežana Savić, former FK Partizan player and director Zoran Mirković, cult Serbian criminal Kristijan Golubović as well as others.

=== Denkova Bašta ===
Denkova Bašta (Денкова башта; "Denko's garden") is the latest addition to Konjarnik, ultra-modern city-within-city, built in the late 1990s and early 2000s, along the eastern side of the Vojislava Ilića street. It extends into Cvetkova pijaca on the north. Complex of several residential, step-like arranged circles of buildings.

=== Rudo ===
Rudo (Рудо) is a complex of three large buildings, each with 30 floors, over 100 meters in height and, therefore, share between themselves 4th place on list of tallest buildings in Belgrade and also in Serbia. Though officially styled Rudo (after a Bosnian town), the buildings are known as the Eastern Gate of Belgrade. All three buildings are step-like and triangular shaped, built in a circle so it always visually appears that one is between the other two. Buildings, styled Rudo 1, Rudo 2 and Rudo 3, were settled in 1976, but never fully completed, as the facade was not finished. Since the 1990s, due to the lack of maintenance, buildings were known for elevator and water pumps problems. Reconstruction began in April 2008.
