= Cvetkova Pijaca =

Green market and neighborhood in Belgrade, Serbia

Coordinates: 44°47′49″N 20°30′22″E

Cvetkova Pijaca (Serbian Cyrillic: Цветкова пијаца), or colloquially Cvetko (Цветко), is an open green market and an urban neighborhood of Belgrade, the capital of Serbia. It is located in Belgrade's municipality of Zvezdara.

== Location ==
Cvetko is located along the Bulevar kralja Aleksandra, in the field south of Zvezdara hill, in the easternmost section of the former Vračar area (modern local community which covers the area of Cvetko is called Vračarsko polje, Vračar field). It is 3,5 kilometers south-east of downtown Belgrade (Terazije). It is centered on the green market and extends into the neighborhood of Konjarnik on the south and Lion on the west.

== History & characteristics ==
In Roman period, when Belgrade was a fortified city of Singidunum, the area of the modern neighborhood was location of three water systems.

In 1902 Belgrade's entrepreneur Cvetko Jovanović (originally from the Struga region) opened a kafana on the Smederevo road, across the Mokri Lug's farmers' market. He named it "Vračar Field", after the location. However, his venue became known as Cvetkova Mehana, and as he also owned neighboring lots, the area gradually became known under this name. Farmers market was in time also named after him, Cvetkova Pijaca (Serbian for Cvetko's market). In the 1930s, area of the modern Cvetkova Pijaca was the eastern edge of the city. Today, neighborhood is dominated by the open farmers' market, one of the major ones in Belgrade. The market, which originates from the late 1920s, is actually officially called "Zvezdara market" but the name didn't catch on. Being on the outskirts of the city, it was known for the goods from all over Serbia, especially cheese, wine and rakia. In 2011 it had over 400 market stalls.

A series of new or enlarged neighborhoods encircled eastern outskirts of Belgrade after World War I. The inspiration for the design of the neighborhoods came from the complex built in 1912 along the Daviel Street in Paris. It consisted of 40 one-floor houses with gardens, indented from the main street. This style became very popular across the Europe. One of such suburbs, called Kotež of King Peter II (Котеж краља Петра II), was located southwest of the market, bounded by the streets Gospodara Vučića, Ulcinjska, Negotinska (modern Stanislava Sremčevića) and Bulevar Kralja Aleksandra.

After World War I, the section near Olimp was settled by the Kalmyks from the shores of the Caspian Sea, which fled Imperial Russia after the October Revolution in 1917. In Budvanska street, they built Belgrade pagoda, a Mongolian-type Buddhist temple in 1929, which was abandoned in 1944 and demolished in the mid-1960s.

In the eastern extension of the market, a row of six skyscrapers was built in 1955. Designed by Ivan Antić, the 12-story high buildings were the first highrise in Belgrade after World War II. They were built by the new techniques, including the climbing formwork, and started the fashion of highrise throughout he city.

Other important nearby features are the sports center "Zvezdara" (popularly called Olimp, Olympus) and the theater "Zvezdara teatar". The population of the neighborhood was 4,843 by the 2002 census.
