= Šumice, Belgrade =

Šumice, Belgrade Шумице
- Urban neighbourhood
- Location within Belgrade
- Coordinates: 44°47′09″N 20°29′20″E
- Country: Serbia
- Region: Belgrade
- Municipality: Voždovac

Area
  - Total: 0.76 km^{2} (0.29 sq mi)

Population (2011)
  - Total: 6,348
  - Density: 8,400/km^{2} (22,000/sq mi)
- Time zone: UTC+1 (CET)
  - Summer (DST): UTC+2 (CEST)
- Area code: +381(0)11
- Car plates: BG

Šumice (Serbian Cyrillic: Шумице, pronounced [ʃûmit͡sɛ]) is an urban neighborhood of Belgrade, the capital of Serbia. It is located in Belgrade's municipality of Voždovac. It is also the name of a park-forest within the neighbourhood.

== Location ==
Šumice is located in the south-eastern section of the hill of Pašino Brdo and in the northern section largely overlaps with the neighborhood of the same name. On the south it is bounded by the Ustanička street and on the east by the Vojislava Ilića street, both streets separating it from the neighborhood of Konjarnik. On the west, the park itself borders the neighborhood of Dušanovac.

== Neighborhood ==
Historical population
Year	Pop.	±%
1981	8,697	—
1991	7,937	−8.7%
2002	7,228	−8.9%
2011	6,348	−12.2%

The neighborhood was constructed in the late 1960s and early 1970s. A modern settlement, with many green areas, can roughly be divided in two parts: southern, with residential building, and northern with smaller, family houses and villas which were quite popular among Belgrade's celebrities in the 1980s. The population in 2011 was 6,348.

The main features in the neighborhood are:

- "Sport Center Šumice", built in 1974, used by the futsal club KMF Konjarnik and the basketball and volleyball teams and for other events (karate and judo championships, etc.). Previously, it was the "House of the Pioneers of Voždovac" (Dom Pionira Voždovac), including a cinema within the complex, which is located in the south-east corner of the park.
- New business center of "KoŠum" named after Šumice, but technically belonging to the neighborhood of Konjarnik.
- Hotel Srbija.
- Health center "Šumice".
- Belgrade's VIII Gymnasium (ex XI) (in the northern corner of the park).

== Park ==
Šumice
- Шумице
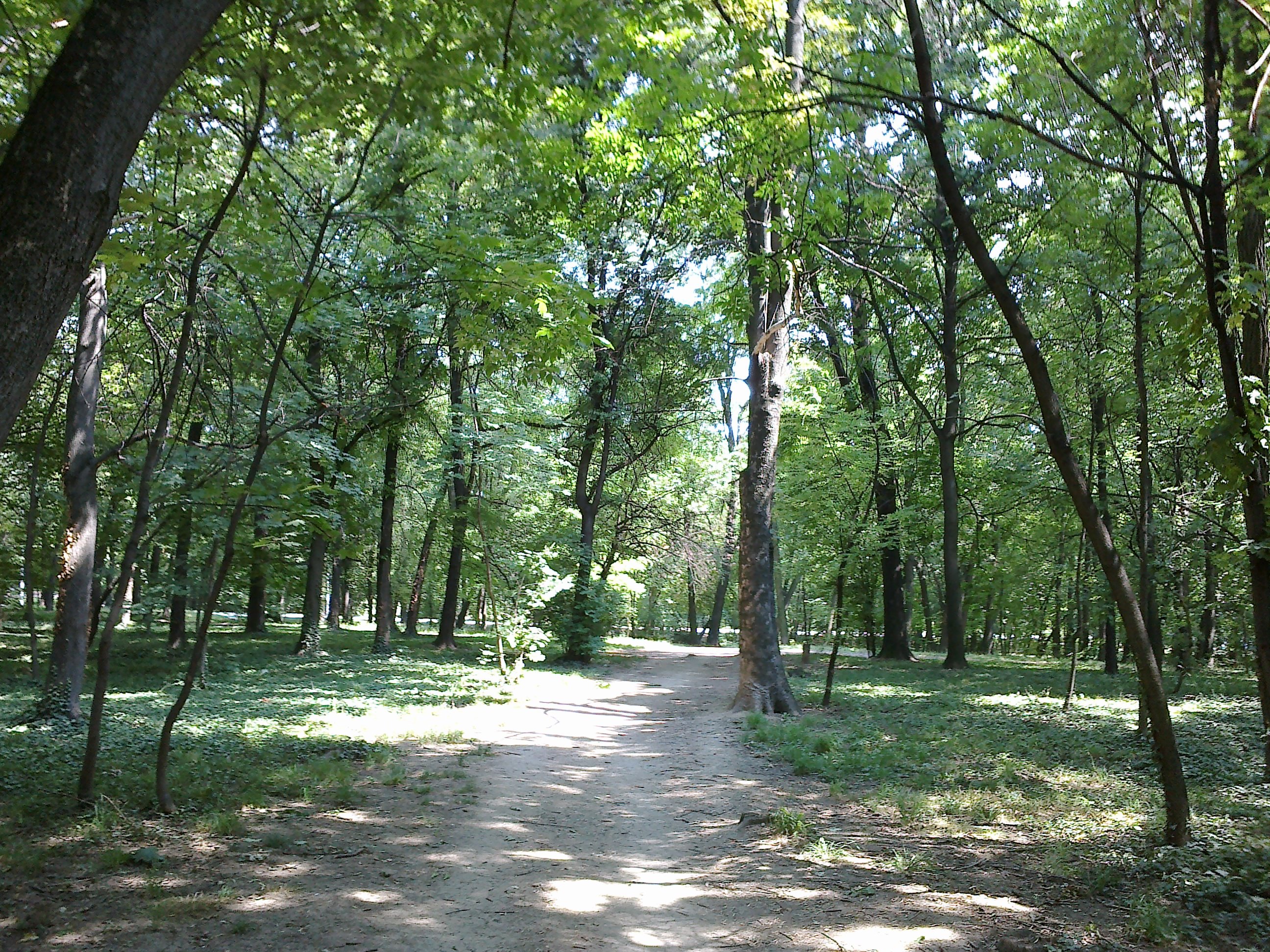
- Central section of Šumice
- Interactive map of Šumice
- Location: Voždovac, Belgrade (Serbia)
- Area: 14.38 ha (35.5 acres)
- Status: urban forest

=== History ===
Šumice originated in the 1950s. It was an effort to create the forested belt around the Belgrade (for example, Banjica Forest was created as a part of the same project).

=== Wildlife ===
The park is inhabited by hedgehogs and bats, but the main attraction in the park are the squirrels which often leave the park and climb on the trees in people's yards. Woodpeckers and blue tits can be frequently seen in the park.

=== Characteristics ===
The park consists of two parts, separated by the Vojvode Toze street into western (larger) and eastern sections.

In the 1990s, in the general air of lawlessness, attempts were made to build concrete objects (shops, kiosks, etc.) in the park itself, but eventually they were removed. In spring 2007, the park was reconstructed. Maps, new wooden gazebos, benches, trash cans and children playgrounds were placed, while a new trim trail through the park was arranged.

The total forested area covers 14.38 hectares (35.5 acres). Main bulk of the park covers an area of 9.8 ha (24 acres), has almost 7 km (4.3 mi) of paths, and over 2,900 individual trees. They mostly include ash, black locust, oak and maple. After several consecutive dry years, almost 200 maple trees withered by 2013 and were replaced with the over 300 seedlings. Another reconstruction began in September 2019. New objects include 25 rest pavilions, both open and covered, chess tables, new drainage system and lights. Though the deadline was 31 December 2019, the works continued well into 2020. Works included construction of the children's playground and exercise attraction "Drveni grad" ("Woodville").

=== 2012 incident ===
On 20 May 2012, group of 20 people hastily entered the forest's section between the Sport Center and the Ustanička street, armed with chainsaws and started to cut the trees. Citizens from the buildings across the Ustanička immediately alerted the authorities, even physically confronted the perpetrators and filmed them with phones. After cutting seven maple trees, which were over 40 years old, the felons ran away as the inspectors, police and later even the mayor of Belgrade Dragan Đilas arrived at the spot. It turned out that it was a private job of the Sport Center's manager who wanted to illegally clear the land so he could build a balloon sports hall. As the city is the owner of the center, he was fired right away and later charged. The city instantly planted ten new maple trees instead of the seven which were cut.

== Transportation ==
Šumice is well connected with other parts of the city, by public transportation:

Buses (with connecting areas of the city):

- No. 17: Konjarnik, Šumice, Autokomanda, Mostarska Petlja, Novi Beograd, Zemun;
- No. 31: Konjarnik, Šumice, Slavija, Terazije, Square of the Republic, Studentski Trg;
- No. ADA 3: Konjarnik, Šumice, Braće Jerković, Darvinova, Kumodraška, Autokomanda, Mostarska Petlja, Boulevard of Vojvoda Mišić, Ada Ciganlija;

Trolleys (with connecting areas of the city):

- No. 19: Konjarnik, Šumice, Crveni Krst, Slavija, Terazije, Studentski Trg;
- No. 21: Učiteljsko Naselje, Šumice, Crveni Krst, Slavija, Terazije, Studentski Trg;
- No. 29: Medakovic, Šumice, Crveni Krst, Slavija, Terazije, Studentski Trg;

Night buses (with connecting areas of the city):

- No. 31: Konjarnik, Šumice, Slavija, Terazije, Square of the Republic, Studentski Trg;
