= Trolleybuses in Belgrade =

Belgrade trolleybus network
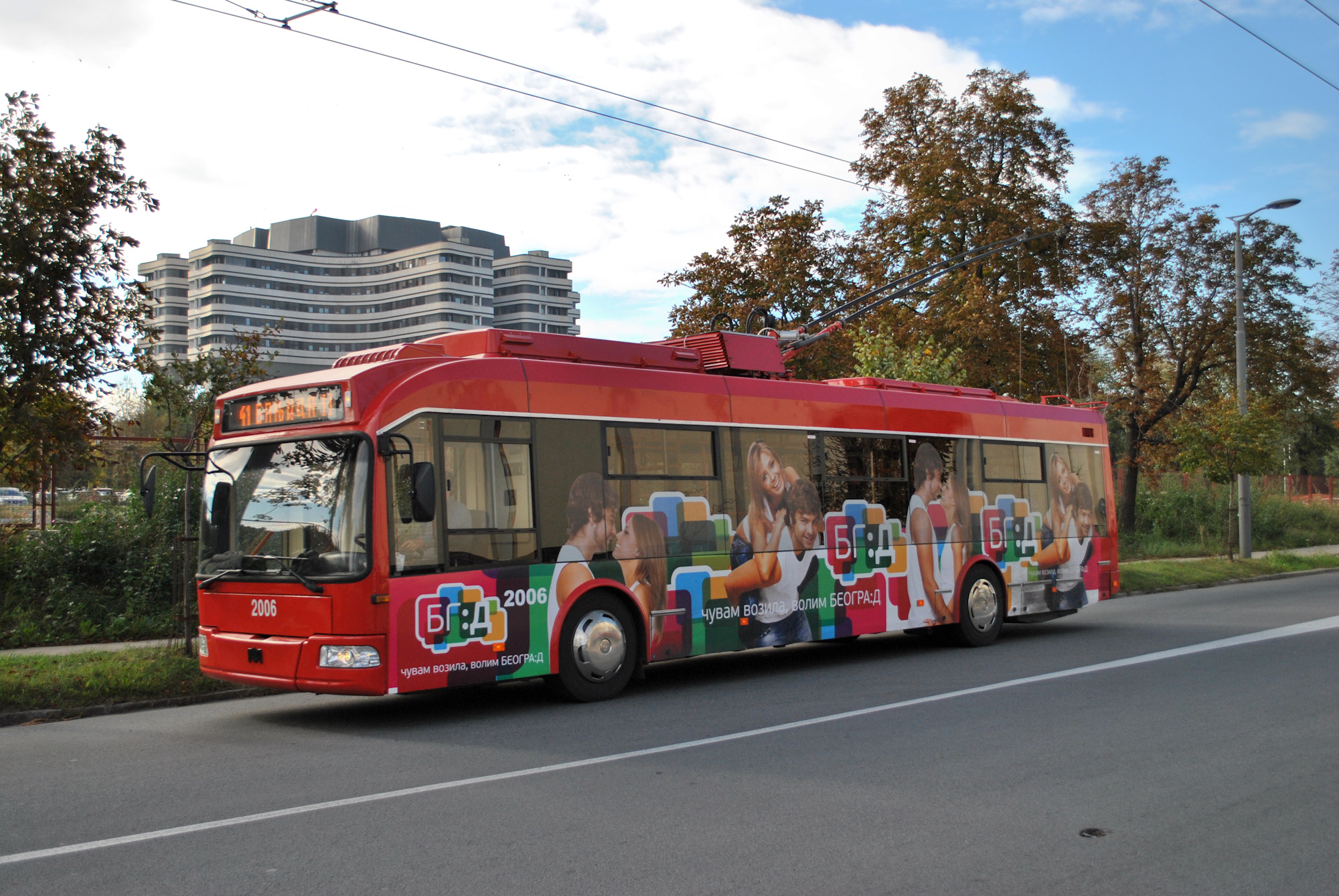
- AKSM-321 in Banjica, in front of the Military Medical Academy

Overview
- Owner: GSP Belgrade
- Locale: Belgrade, Serbia
- Transit type: Trolleybus
- Number of lines: 7 (daytime)
- Website: GSP (in Serbian)

Operation
- Began operation: 22 June 1947
- Operator: GSP Belgrade

Technical
- System length: Line length: 55.8 km (34.7 mi)
- Electrification: 600 V DC
System map

The Belgrade trolleybus system forms part of the public transportation network in the city of Belgrade, the capital of Serbia. It is operated by the city-owned public transportation company GSP Belgrade. In 2017, the network consisted of 7 lines, with 125 trolleybuses operating on 55.8 km (34.7 mi) of two-way overhead wires. Trola, Serbian name for the trolley pole, became the common, colloquial name for the trolleybus among Belgraders.

== History ==
=== Background ===
The idea of introducing trolleybuses was considered during Interbellum. In the late 1930s, the city's Directory for trams and lights prepared the acquisition of the first vehicles. The intention was to introduce the trolleybus lines which would connect the downtown Belgrade to Karaburma. World War II prevented the realization of this plan but the devastation of the tram infrastructure during the war revitalized the idea of trolleybuses.

=== 1947-1960s expansion ===
The first trolleybus was presented to the public during the Labor Day parade on 1 May 1947 while the network became operational on 22 June 1947. The first two lines were Kalemegdan-Slavija and Crveni Krst-Slavija, which were soon after joined into one line. Several months later, the extension of the line to Dušanovac was opened. In the 1950s, the general idea was that trolleybuses should take over the major role in the public transportation. By 1955, the number of trolleybuses rose to 42. Envisioned plans included lines to Zemun, Karaburma, New Belgrade and Dedinje, but not all were carried into effect. Line to Zemun was opened in 1956, and in time three lines across the Sava river were formed: Line 14 – Zeleni Venac-Gornji Grad (Zemun) (which was considered a successor line to the pre-war tram line), Line 15 – Zeleni Venac-Novi Grad (Zemun) and Line 16 – Zeleni Venac-Pohorska, New Belgrade.

During this period, trolleybus became part of the Belgrade's sub-culture due to the activity of kešanje (slang for hanging onto something). Instead of entering the vehicle and paying for the ticket, the teenagers and young adults would grab onto the trolley pole on the outside.

=== 1970s decline ===
Since the late 1960s, city authorities began to consider abolishing the trolleybus network completely. In 1973 all three lines across the river were terminated and by the ending of Branko Pešić’s tenure as the mayor of Belgrade in 1974, only one line survived, Kalemegdan-Kruševačka, Lekino Brdo. It was planned for it to be abolished, too, but already in the mid-1970s, after several types of research, city government changed the opinion and began developing the trolleybus network again.

=== 1980s revitalization ===
By the early 1980s, new neighborhoods planned to become part of the network were Konjarnik, Miljakovac, Učiteljsko Naselje, Medaković, Banjica, Kumodraž, and Zvezdara. By 1982 trolleybuses reached Konjarnik (Line 19) and Učiteljsko Naselje (Line 21) and the Line 28, connecting Kalemegdan to Zvezdara opened in 1983. In 1985 Line 41 connected Kalemegdan to Banjica II and in 1986 Line 40 was opened between Banjica II and Zvezdara. By the late 1980s, citizens became accustomed to the network and in the 1990s a new trolleybus depot was built in Dorćol, with the capacity of servicing 135 vehicles.

=== 2010s ===
After new city government took over in 2013, an idea of abolishing the trolleybus network was raised again, partially prompted by the experimental introduction of the electric buses. Due to the possible creation of the pedestrian zone in the entire central section of Belgrade, propositions include the change of the routes in downtown, the relocation of the central terminus from Studentski Trg to Slavija and of the depo from Dorćol to Medaković. The remaining lines should connect the hilly parts of the city: Konjarnik, Medaković, Vračar, Banjica and Kanarevo Brdo. City manager Goran Vesić announced that one single tram line will replace all four trolleybus lines (19, 21, 22 and 29) and the only bus line (31), which traverse through the city's main street Kralja Milana. Regarding reasons, Vesić stated that the overhead lines look ugly in downtown and that citizens complained about the noise made by the trolleybuses. The immediate reaction of the citizens was mostly negative.

However, some of the advantages of the trolleybuses are their minimal noise pollution. Also, there is a matter of price of digging up the entire center of the city so that at least 6 km (3.7 mi) of tram tracks can be placed, and the cost of buying the new trams which will supposedly be operated on capacitors, without the grid. At the moment, five lines pass through the main street 47 times per hour. On average, that is one vehicle on every 86 second, which is virtually impossible with only one line. In May 2017, Prime Minister of Serbia Aleksandar Vučić, even though the Belgrade's city transportation is completely outside of his jurisdiction, stated that he wants to abolish the trolleybus network completely and replace it with the electric buses. As a reason, he said that the trolleybuses are causing problems and that when one stops due to the malfunction, it stops the entire traffic behind it. Though electric buses may be a better solution than the trams, Vučić's reasoning is dubious, just like the Vesić's. Trolleybus has easier traffic avoidance than a tram. Contrary to the trams, which indeed stops all the trams behind when one malfunction because they all use the same tracks when a trolleybus is broken, it is simply unhooked from the grid and is easily bypassed by the trolleybus behind it.

After public protests, the 2013 idea was modified in 2015 and the city announced that the terminus from Studentski Trg will be relocated to the Dunavska Street, extending the trolleybus lines to Dorćol, as a temporary solution. As of July 2019 nothing has been done regarding the trolleybuses relocation. Due to the massive 2018-2019 reconstruction of the Republic Square, some lines were shortened only to the Slavija quare, some were replaced with buses, while some were abolished completely. After continued citizens protests, city administration modified its idea of the large pedestrian zone in downtown and announced that all trolleybuses will be returned to their regular lines in September 2019, after the reconstruction of the square is finished. However, after the square was reopened for traffic on 1 November 2019, lines 21 and 22 remained shortened to the Slavija Square, while lines 19 and 28 were completely abolished due to the "overlapping in the central city zone". But it was also reported that the reduction (it also included several bus lines) is part of the ongoing plan by the city to transform the main traffic route into the pedestrian zone and because of the weight restrictions due to the botched reconstruction of the Republic Square.

Since 2016, both abolition of the trolleybuses and replacement with the electric buses, and purchase of new, modern vehicles which does not require complicated grid, were announced. The Belarus' MAZ was mentioned as a possible partner in this acquisition. City also mentioned possible renovation of the already operational fleet. Replacement of the old vehicles with the new ones was again mentioned in 2018, which was reiterated in the late 2019, when city announced purchase of 40 trolleybuses in 2020. This was postponed due to the COVID-19 pandemic.

In December 2018, Ministry of construction, transportation and infrastructure instigated changes in the Law on Communal Activity, which would allow for private companies to operate trams and trolleybuses, as the present law allows them only to operate city transportation's bus lines. However, deputy mayor Vesić said that city will buy 80 electric buses instead and that trolleybus lines will be shut completely. In October 2019, a scandal broke out when it was reported that some 80 trolleybuses (64%) are not registered (which was discovered by the police in the spring of 2019). GSP general manager was charged, though the company claimed that vehicles have regular technical inspections.

=== 2020s ===
In April 2021, Belgrade city delegation visited Moscow's tram factory PC Transport Systems. President of the city assembly, Nikola Nikodijević, announced that 154 trolleybuses (with 130 trams) will be purchased by the city until 2033. Though not so publicly, like in the case of line No. 28, residents of the Konjarnik neighborhood also protested the shutting down of the line No. 19. In December 2021, during a meeting with the residents, deputy major Vesić announced the restoration of the line No. 19 for 4 January 2022. He also announced purchase of 80 new trolleybuses, and expansion of the grid in 2022, though the 2022 city budget has no funds allocated for this, so reporters connected statements with the upcoming city elections in April 2022. In the late 2021, due to the old age of the fleet, trolleybuses on line 21 were completely replaced with buses, until "the new trolleybuses are purchased". Trolleybuses would eventually be restored to the line in December 2025. In February 2022 city announced that the process of acquiring 80 new vehicles began, and that plan is to purchase 20 trolleybuses per year in 2023, 2024, 2025 and 2026.

In March 2023, petition was started to extend lines 19, 21 and 22 back to Studentski Trg, as the situation was for decades before 2019. Since then, the commuters had to transfer to other buses and trolleybuses at Slavija Square to reach downtown.

In December 2025, following the completion of reconstruction works in Bulevar kneza Aleksandra Karađorđevića, line 41 was not restored, instead being substituted by the bus line 41A. Reports also surfaced that the line is planned to be fully shut down after New Year. It is believed that this is due to a plan to abolish the left turn from Takovska into Svetogorska, a claim further supported by the fact 41A avoids that intersection, instead turning left at Nikola Pašić Square.

In late April 2026, the city assembly adopted a plan to allow a private operator to establish four electric bus lines, the routes of which would perfectly overlap with the trolleybus lines 19, 21, 22 and 41, as well as the bus line 32. Ivan Banković, of the "Centar" syndicate, warned that this decision could be the city's way of "quietly" shutting down the trolleybus system and privatizing the entire public transport.

==== Dorćol route ====
As the city authorities continued with their already heavily criticized project of removing the traffic completely from downtown and conducting it into the neighborhood of Dorćol, they began the construction of the grid. Local residents opposed the idea and blocked the streets. When city sent workers to begin the works on the new grid, the residents physically prevented them. They are opposing the project which will reduce the sidewalks and number of parking spots, cut the trees and induce further traffic jams. City claimed they are doing this because of the wishes of the citizens but never provided any proof of that. After negotiations with the residents, city decided to temporarily halt the works and later announced the partial change of the route.

In March 2020, due to the COVID-19 pandemic, a state of emergency was declared in Serbia, which included social distancing, partial curfew and ban on public gathering. The emergency was declared on 16 March and already on 17 March city began to cut trees to make way for the grid. Citizens reported that the city is building the route as they like, pushing aside what little agreement they made with the citizens, that workers employed in the construction don't follow protocolos of protection during the pandemic and that works are being done without all necessary permits since there was no time to obtain them so fast. City responded that now, when there is no traffic, it is ideal time to work and that they do everything as agreed with the citizens who are now legally prevented to organize protests and blockades due to the state of emergency. The works continued only during the night curfew, including loud construction works like the hydraulic concrete drilling. Police refused to intervene so the situation culminated in late April when citizens gathered in the streets, breaking the curfew and halting the works. Police then appeared with black Marias but an ad hoc agreement was reached by which residents returned to their homes, and the works were stopped.

==== Line 28 ====
City Hospital (today KBC Zvezdara) was opened on 1 December 1935. In the early 1941, before World War II began in Yugoslavia, the bus Line 28 was established, which connected City Hospital to Theatre Square in downtown Belgrade, via Hadžipopovac and Profesorska Kolonija. The line was kept operational by the German occupational authorities throughout the war, from 1941 to 1944. After the war, the bus line of the similar route continued, but was renamed to Line 27. In 1949, the pre-war line was fully re-established, and the number 28 was returned.

The buses which operated on the line were Miesse and Renault. Later bus brands on the line included Leyland Royal Tiger Worldmaster, MAN and Ikarbus. The buses were replaced by trolleybuses in 1983, but neither the number nor the route changed (modern street names): Dimitrija Tucovića-Cvijićeva-Jaše Prodanovića-Takovska-Svetogorska-Makedonska-Republic Square-Vasina-Studentski Trg.

The changes in 2019, especially the shut down of the line 28 was described as the "complete miss" and caused public protests and gatherings, and street and works blockades. Thousands of people signed petition asking for the line to be restored and organized protests along the line's route. Closing and shortening of the lines in November 2019 right away resulted in crowds in the surviving lines and massive public discontent. Especially affected was Zvezdara municipality as lines 19, 21 and 28 were connecting different parts of Zvezdara to downtown. Furthermore, line 28 was the only line of public transportation which connected downtown to KBC Zvezdara, one of the largest medical-hospital complexes in Belgrade. Authorities said that everything is covered with changing buses on other lines, but it turned out that for some, previously direct routes, it takes an extra hour for the commuters. Another explanation by the authorities was reduced pollution in downtown. However, an extra diesel-operated bus line No. 22A, for the shortened section of the trolleybus lines through the city center, was introduced. Just five days into new network, mayor Zoran Radojičić said that line 28 "may be reintroduced". The residents continued to occasionally block the traffic and in February 2020 they placed a "monument" to line 28 at its former terminus at Studentski Trg.

The line was also directly connecting several students' dormitories to the Belgrade University. The abolishment and shortening of the lines was abrupt and unannounced. In the 2015 project, line 28 was not only preserved, but was planned for extension - to Medaković III on one, and to Cerak Vinogradi, on the other side. When the reconstruction of the Republic Square began, it was stated that the shutting of the lines was temporary. And when the works were finished on 1 September 2019, all the lines were indeed restored. However, when two weeks later the newly renovated square began to fall apart, the cubes which were used for paving were turned upside down. After this was finished, the lines were shut down, unofficially, because of the mishandled reconstruction and poor quality.

After 4 months of protests, city finally accepted to hold talks with the citizens regarding line 28 in the late February 2020. Previously they completely ignored the protesters, not answering to any petition or question, refusing to disclose the study on which they based the abolishment of the line, even when they had to do it when the Law on Free Access to Information was invoked by the activists. After several sessions city remained insistent on enforcing pedestrian zone in the entire downtown and refusing to re-establish the line. The activists said they will physically prevent removal of the electric grid. In June 2020, city administration announced restoration of the line for 6 July, after the study of Transportation Faculty which showed that the restoration of the line is justified.

== Lines ==
A transit diagram of trolleybus lines

As of 2017, there are seven lines in operation. They operate every day, on a different timetable, depending on the time of the day or if it is a weekend. There are no night trolleybus lines.

Number	Route (Neighborhoods)
19	Trg Slavija – Čubura – Crveni Krst – Šumice – Denkova Bašta – Konjarnik
21	Trg Slavija – Čubura – Crveni Krst – Šumice – Denkova Bašta – Učiteljsko Naselje
22	Trg Slavija – Čubura – Crveni Krst – Pašino Brdo – Kruševačka street
28	Studentski Trg – Republic Square – Stari Grad – Palilula – Hadžipopovac – Bulbulder – Zvezdara
29	Studentski Trg – Republic Square – Terazije – London – Slavija – Čubura – Crveni Krst – Šumice – Denkova Bašta – Konjarnik – Medaković II – Padina – Medaković III
40	Zvezdara – Bulbuder – Hadžipopovac – Palilula – Andrićev Venac – London – Savski Venac – Zapadni Vračar – Mostar – Senjak – Prokop – Dedinje – Banjica – Banjica II
41	Studentski Trg – Republic Square – Stari Grad – Andrićev Venac – London – Savski Venac – Zapadni Vračar – Mostar – Senjak – Prokop – Dedinje – Banjica - Banjica II

=== Former lines ===
Number	Route	Year abolished	Successor line
1	Kalemegdan - Grčića Milenka (circular line)	-	11, 13 (Note: Due to construction works the circular line was split into two radial lines. This change became permanent.)
11	Kalemegdan - Kruševačka	-	22
12	Kalemegdan - Banjica	1970	41 (Note: Upon its conversion to a trolleybus, the line traded part of its route with 42.)
13	Kalemegdan - Šumice	1969	31
14	Zeleni Venac – Zemun (Gornji grad)	1973	84 (Note: In the late 1970s, all vehicles from the line 14 were transferred to its slightly longer subvariant 14B, which was then renumbered to 84.)
15	Zeleni Venac – Zemun (Novi grad)	1972	15 (bus line)
16	Zeleni Venac – New Belgrade (Pohorska)	1969	16 (bus line)

Some of the recently abolished lines also include Line 22L, which operated from Kalemegdan to Slavija, as the shortest line of the public transportation in Belgrade (2.5 km (1.6 mi)) which was abolished on 3 September 2012, and Line 29N, night line which was abolished in 2006 and replaced by the bus. The L lines are still occasionally used as replacement for the regular lines during works.

== The fleet ==
In 2012, when the fleet numbered 133 vehicles, the breakdown by the type was:

- AKSM-321 – 93 vehicles
- AKSM-333 – 12 vehicles
- TrolZa-62052.01 – 12 vehicles
- AKSM-201 – 10 vehicles
- ZiU-9 – 4 vehicles
- VMZ-5298.00 – 1 vehicle
- TrolZa-5275.05 Optima – 1 vehicle

3 Hess/Kiepe lighTram buses will be delivered in June 2019.

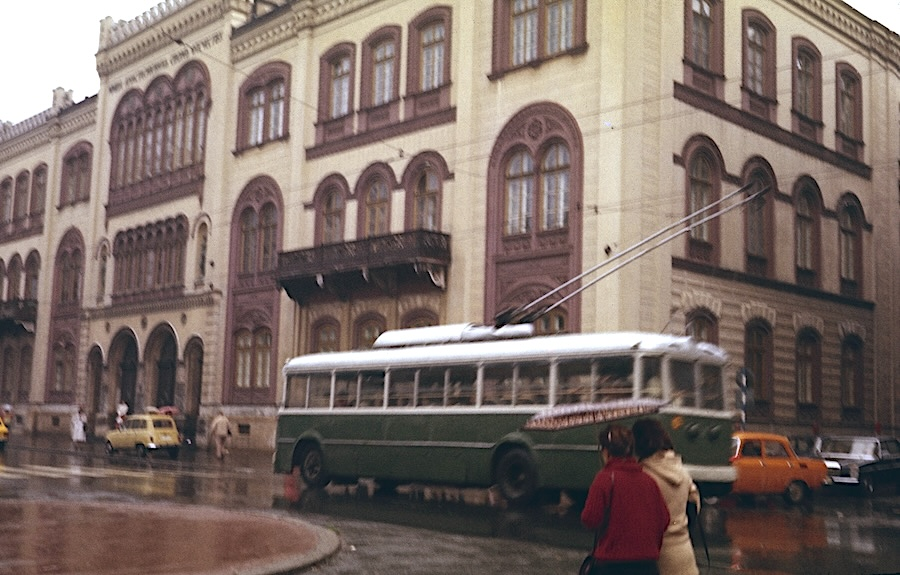
A domestically built FAP ES trolleybus passing the Captain Miša Mansion in 1981. The last trolleybuses of this type were withdrawn in 1982.

Former types included:

- FIAT 668F – 31 vehicles (introduced in 1947)
- Alfa Romeo 140AF – 12 vehicles (1949)
- Goša I – 40 vehicles (1956) (domestic production); withdrawn between 1970 and 1974.
- Goša II – 38 vehicles (1957–58) (domestic production); withdrawn between 1970 and 1974.
- FAP ES 63 – 60 vehicles (1964–65) (domestic production); withdrawn in 1982.
- Gräf & Stift GE 112 M 16 – 3 vehicles (2003) (donation by the city of Salzburg)
- Gräf & Stift GOE 112 M 11 – 2 vehicles (2003) (donation by the city of Salzburg)

== Photos ==
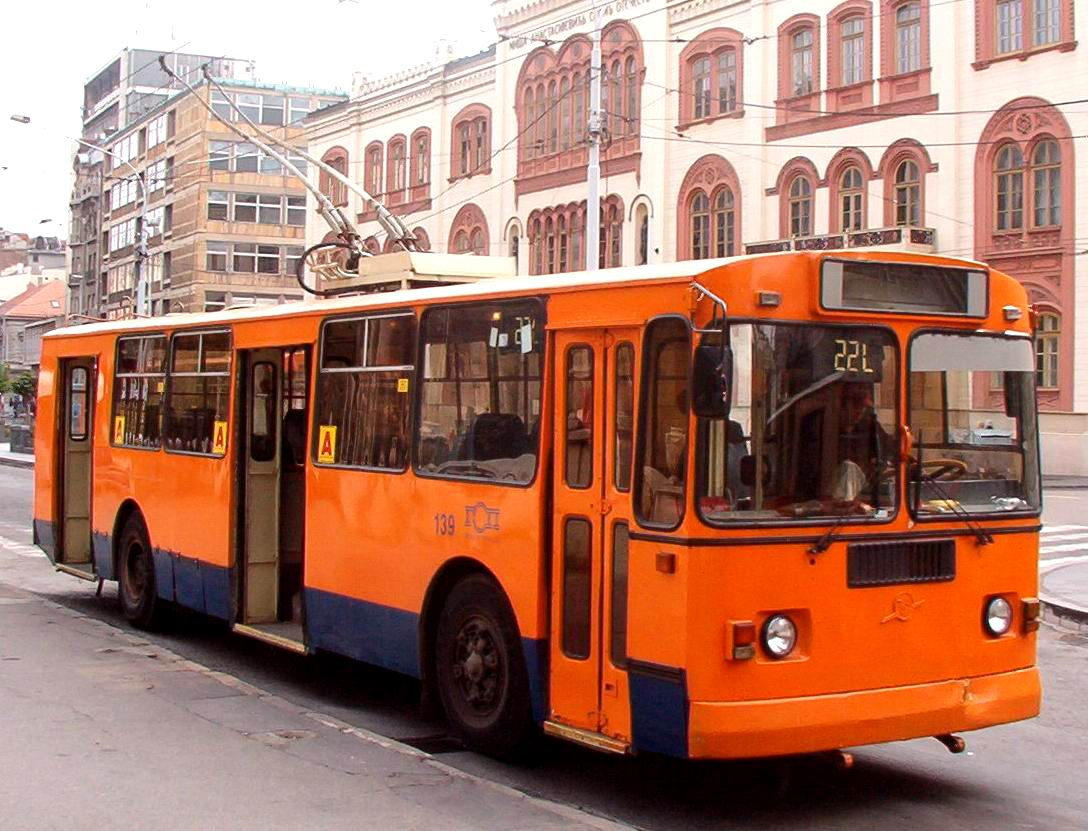
ZiU-9 at the Studentski Trg terminus, in front of the Rectorate of the University of Belgrade

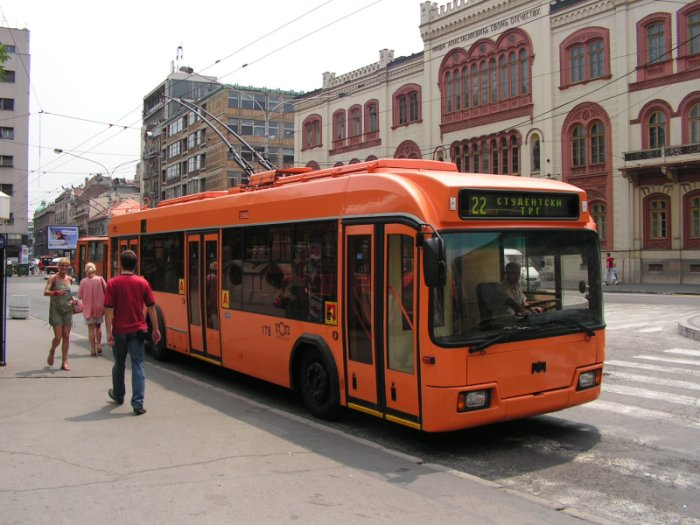
AKSM-321 at the same terminus

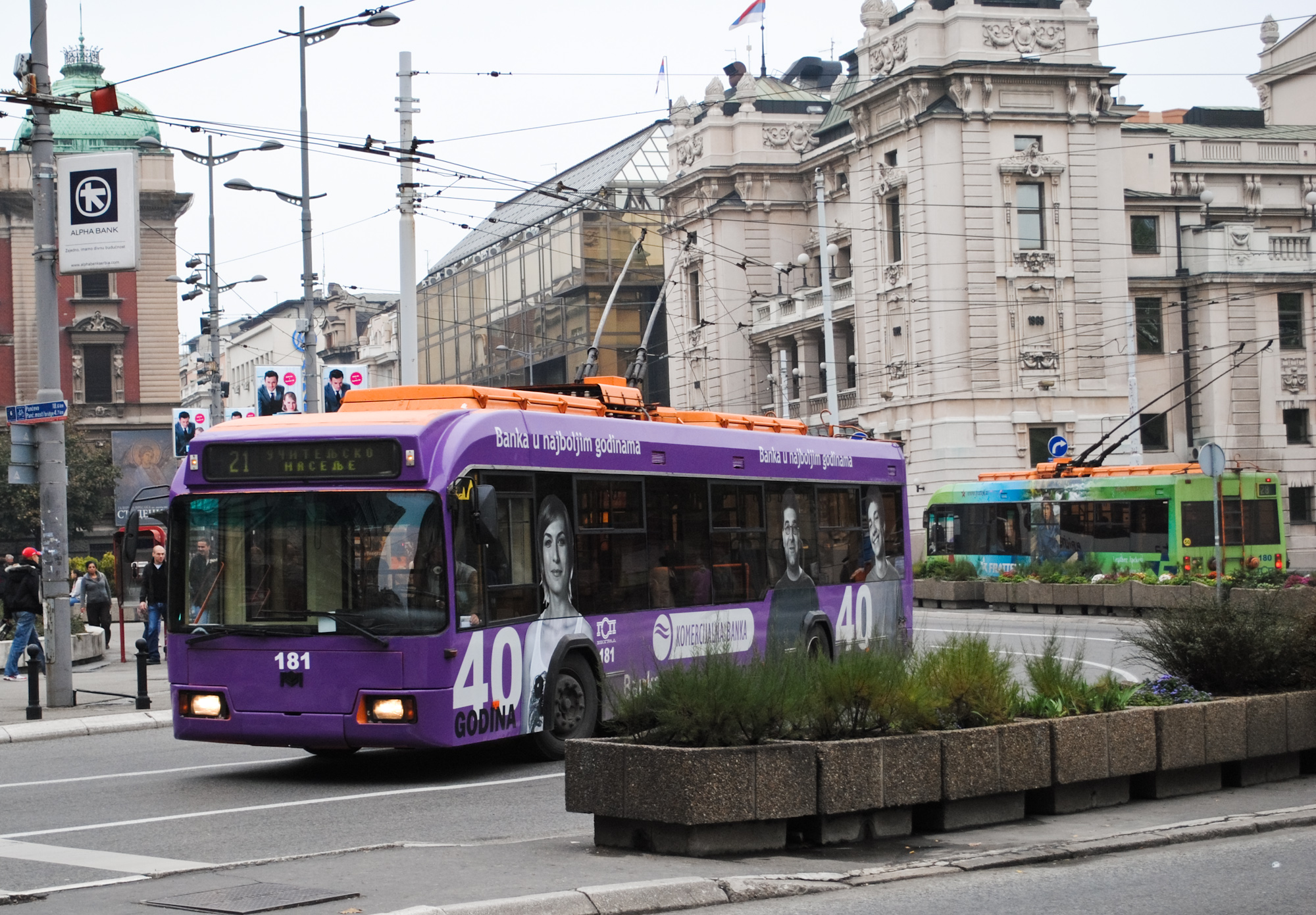
AKSM-333 at the Republic Square, in front of the National Theatre in Belgrade

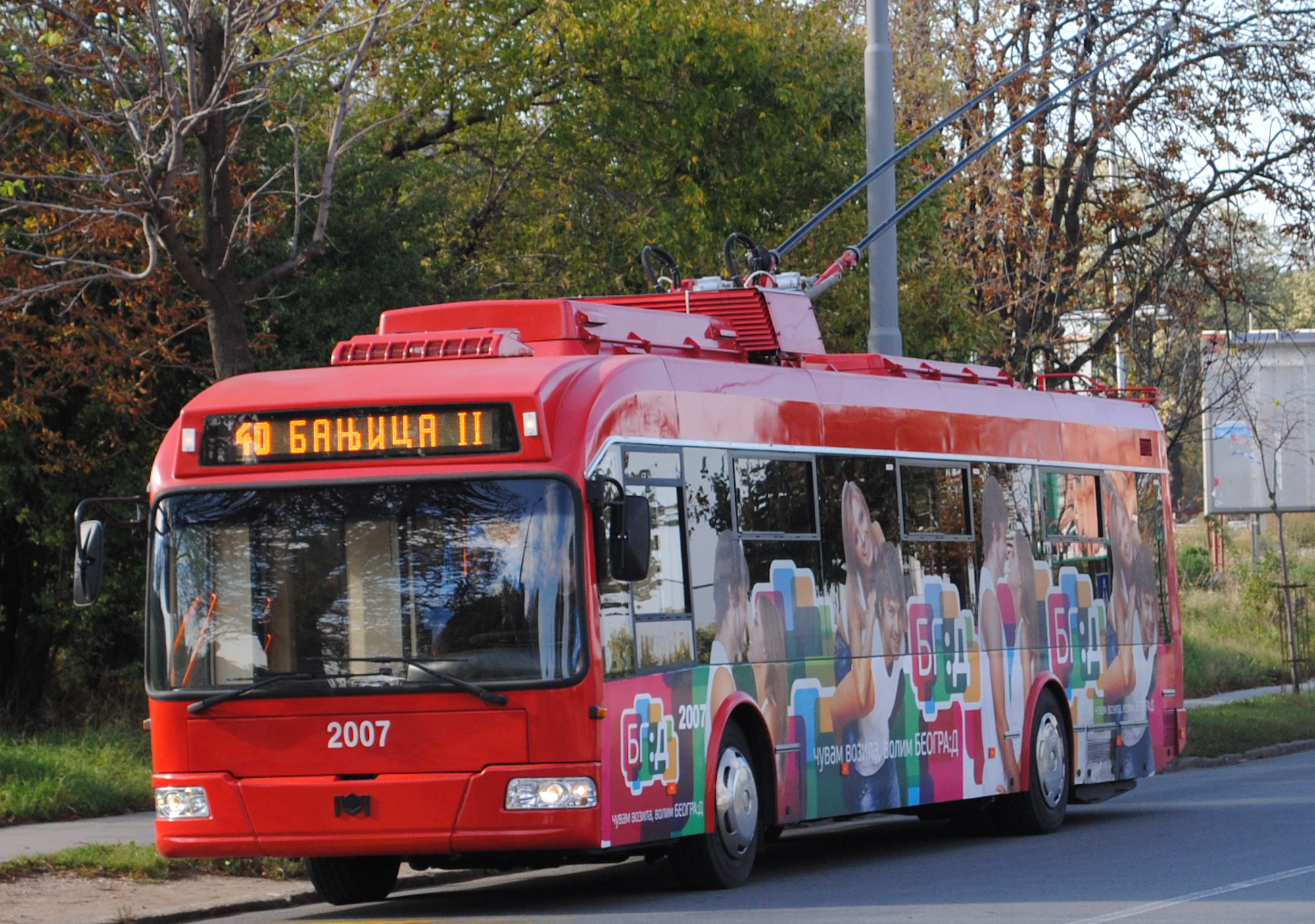
AKSM-321

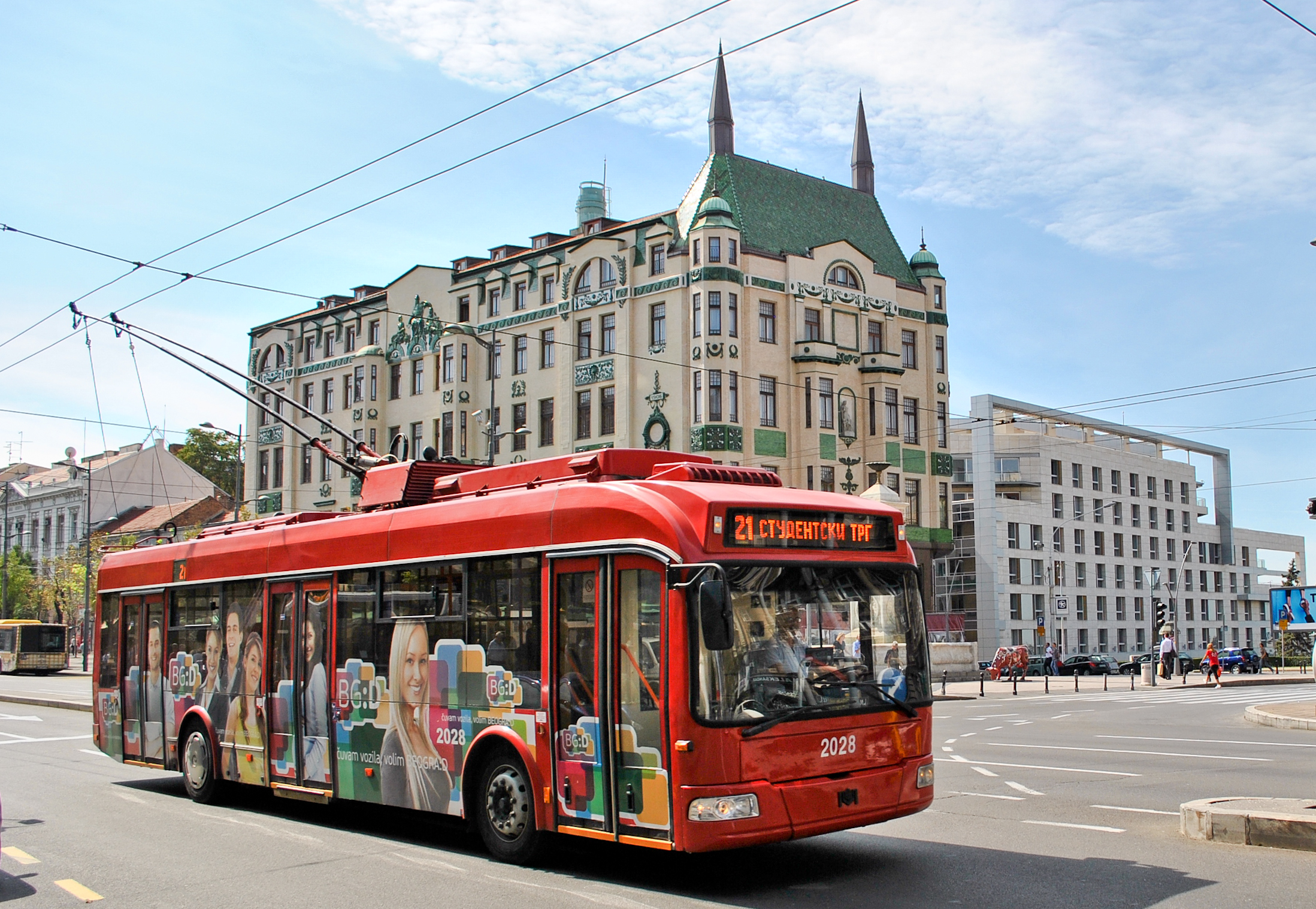
AKSM-321 in Terazije, in front of the Hotel Moskva

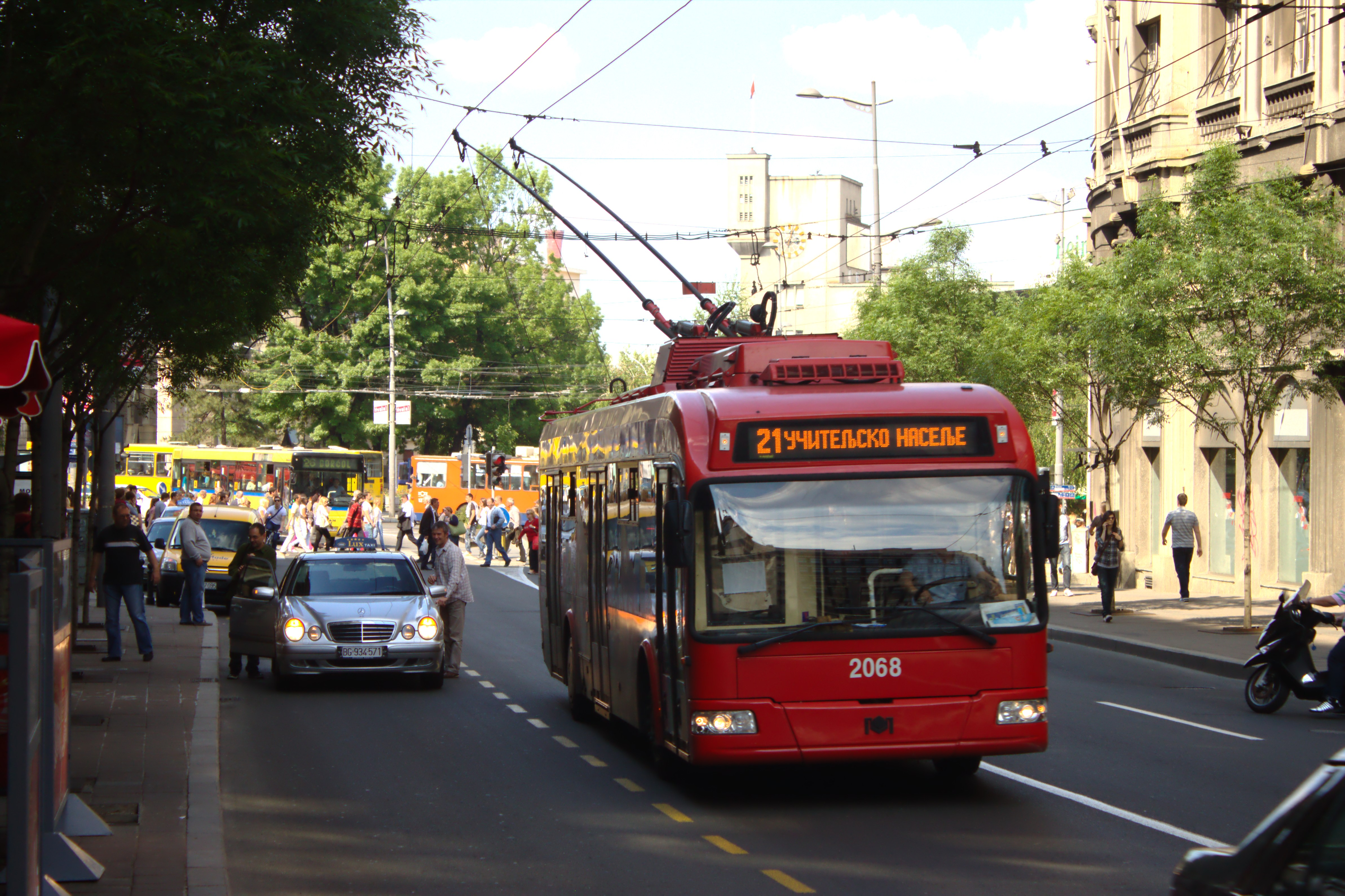
AKSM-321 in Kolarčeva street

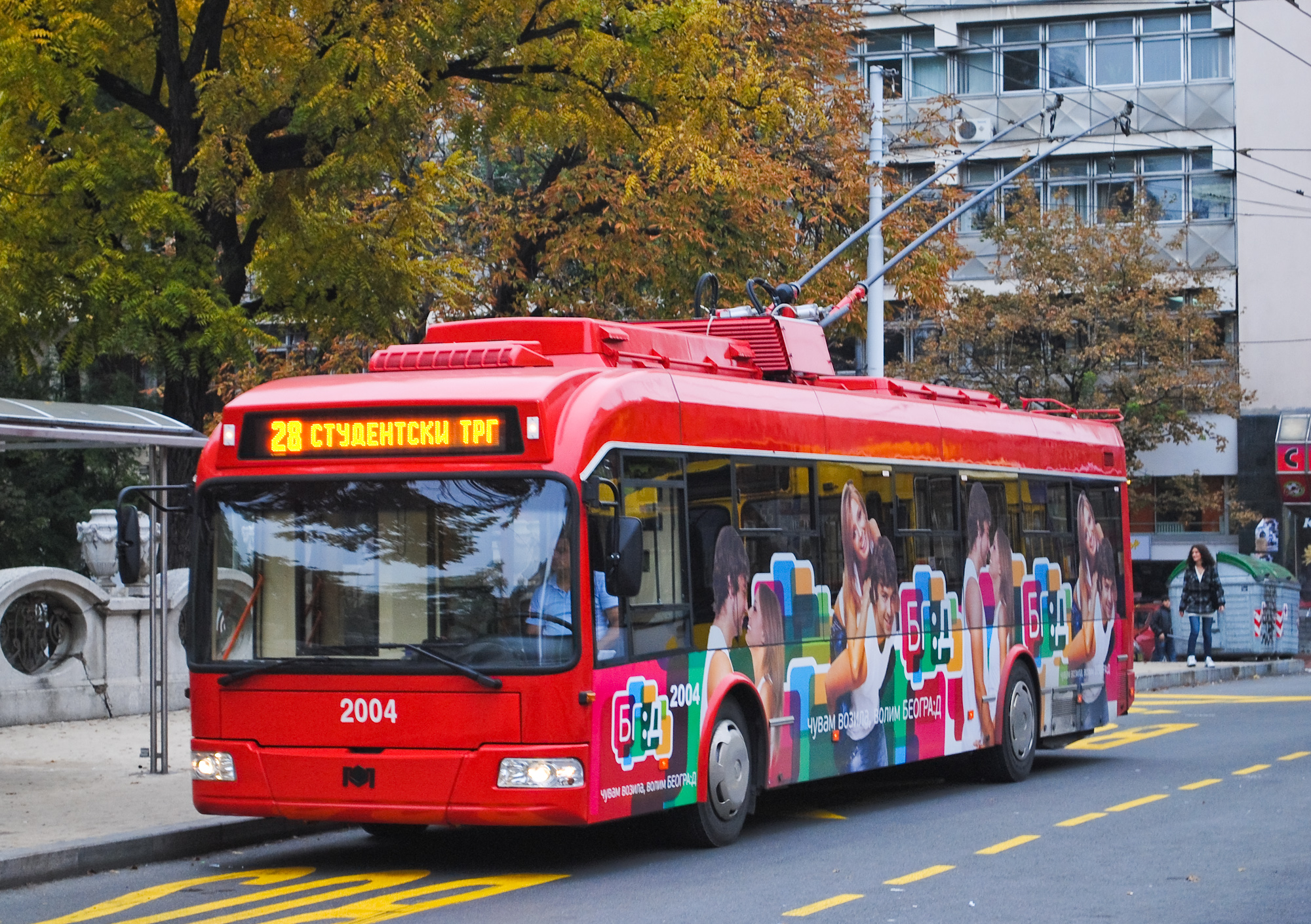
AKSM-321 at the Studentski Trg terminus

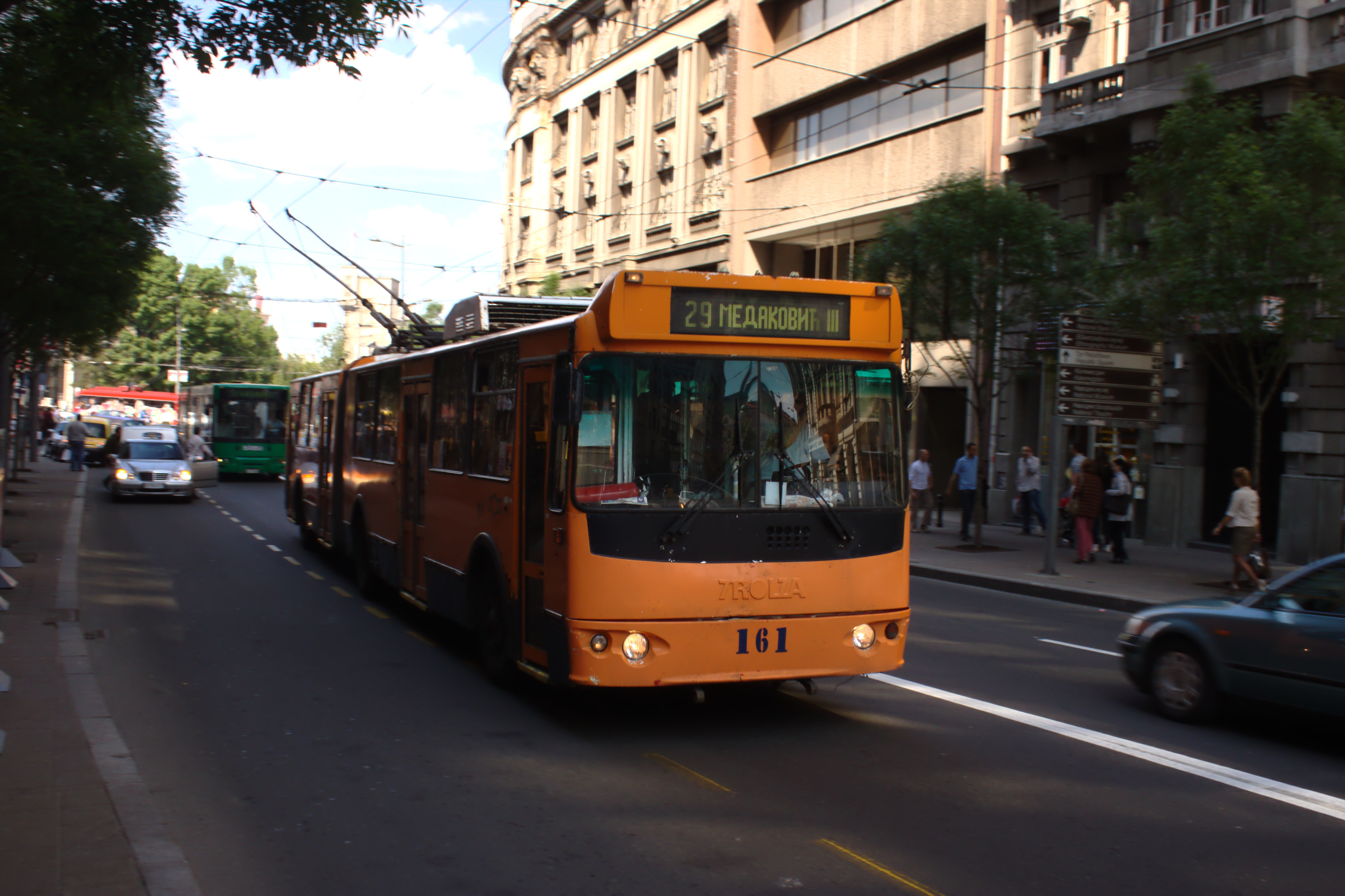
TrolZa-62052.01 in Kolarčeva street

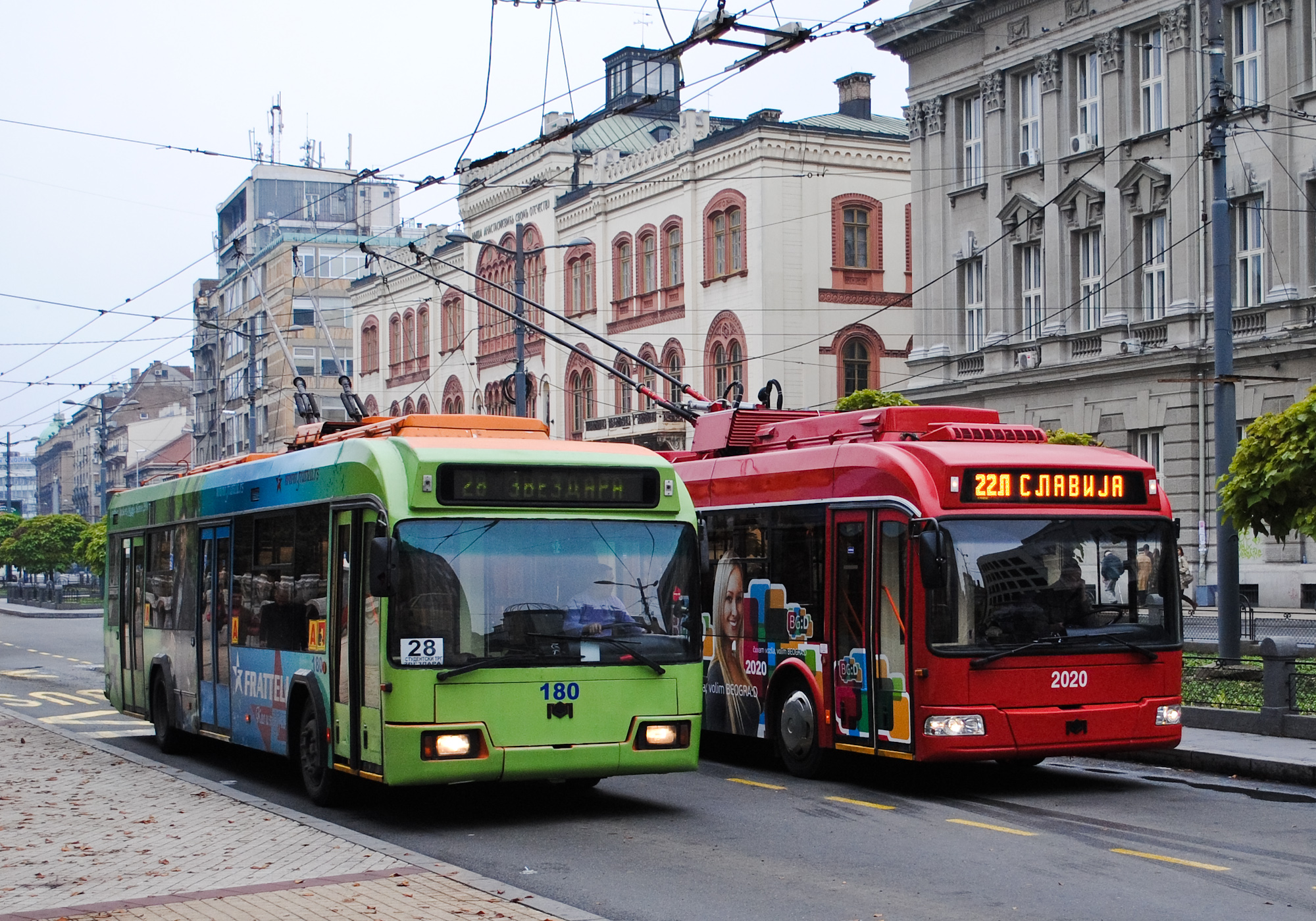
AKSM-321 and AKSM-333 at the Studentski Trg terminus

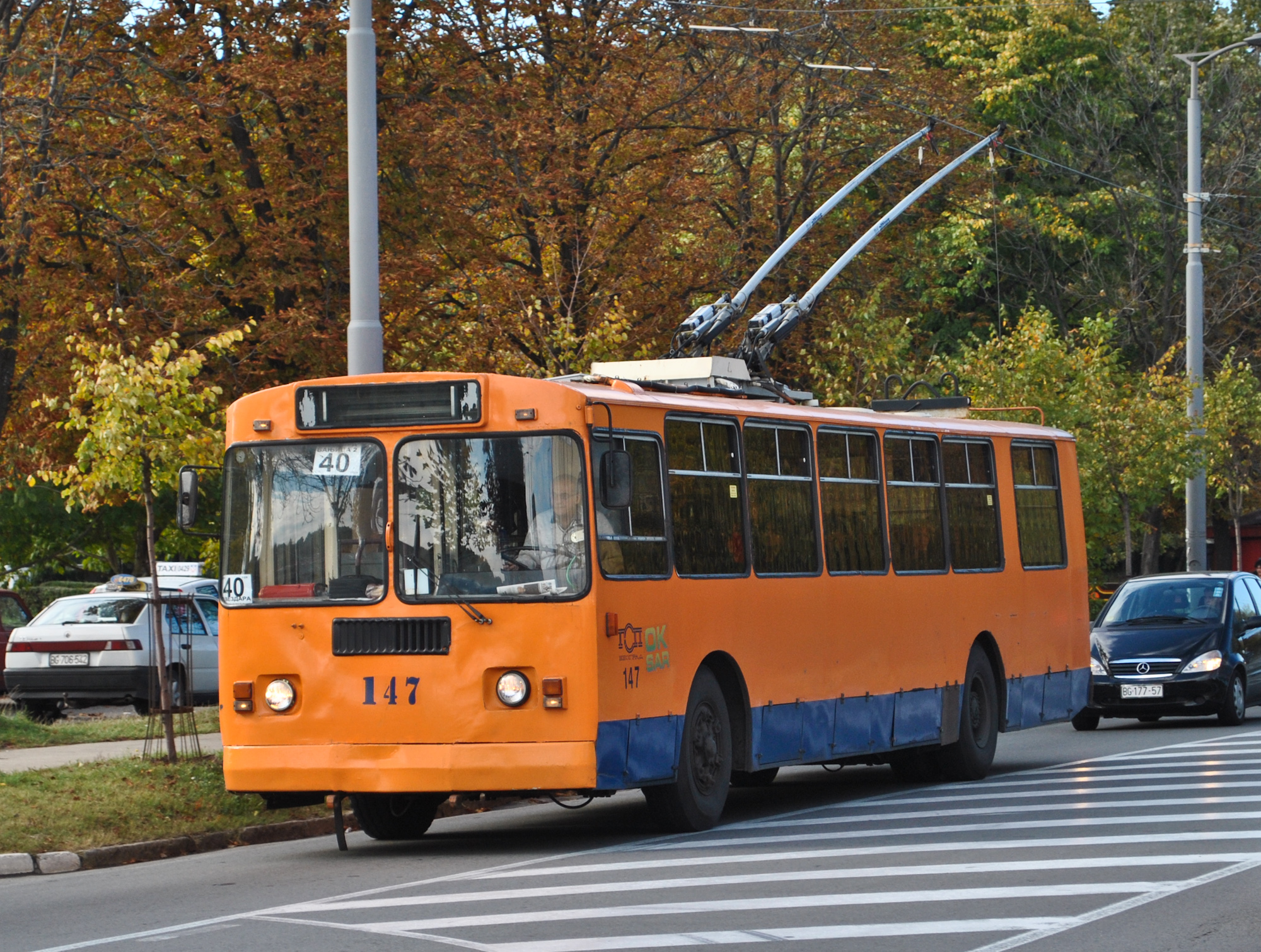
ZiU-9

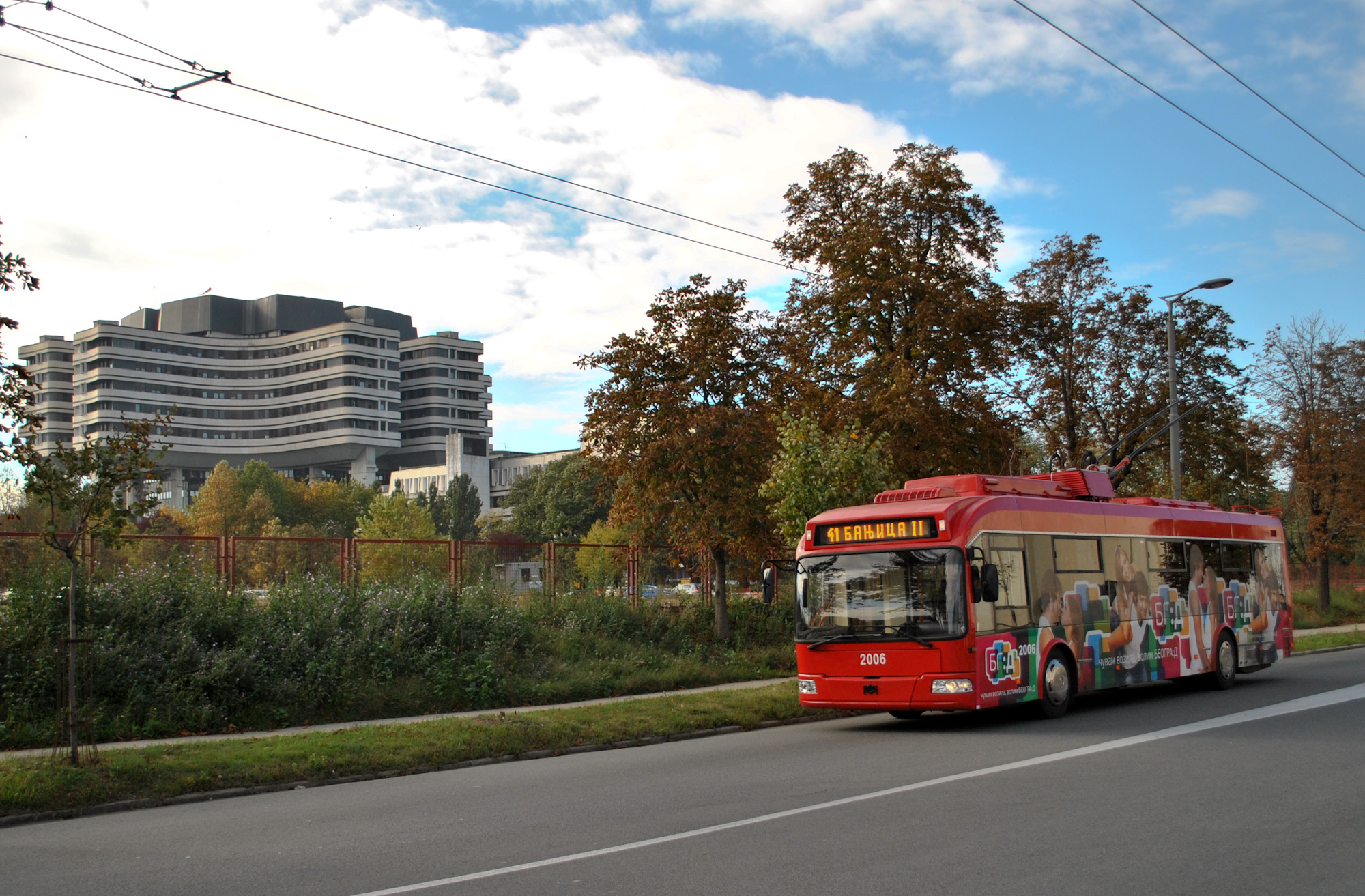
AKSM-321 in Banjica, in front of the Military Medical Academy

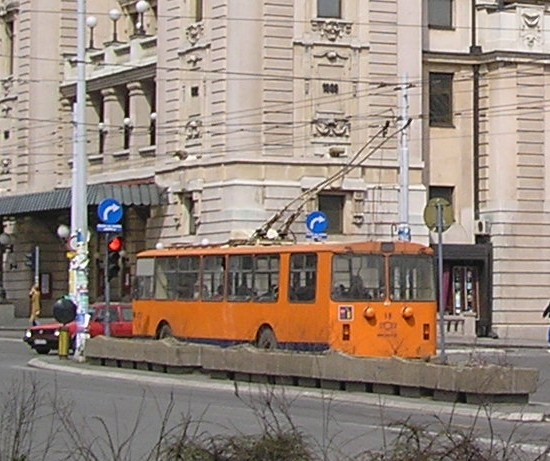
ZiU-9 in the Republic Square, in front of the National theater

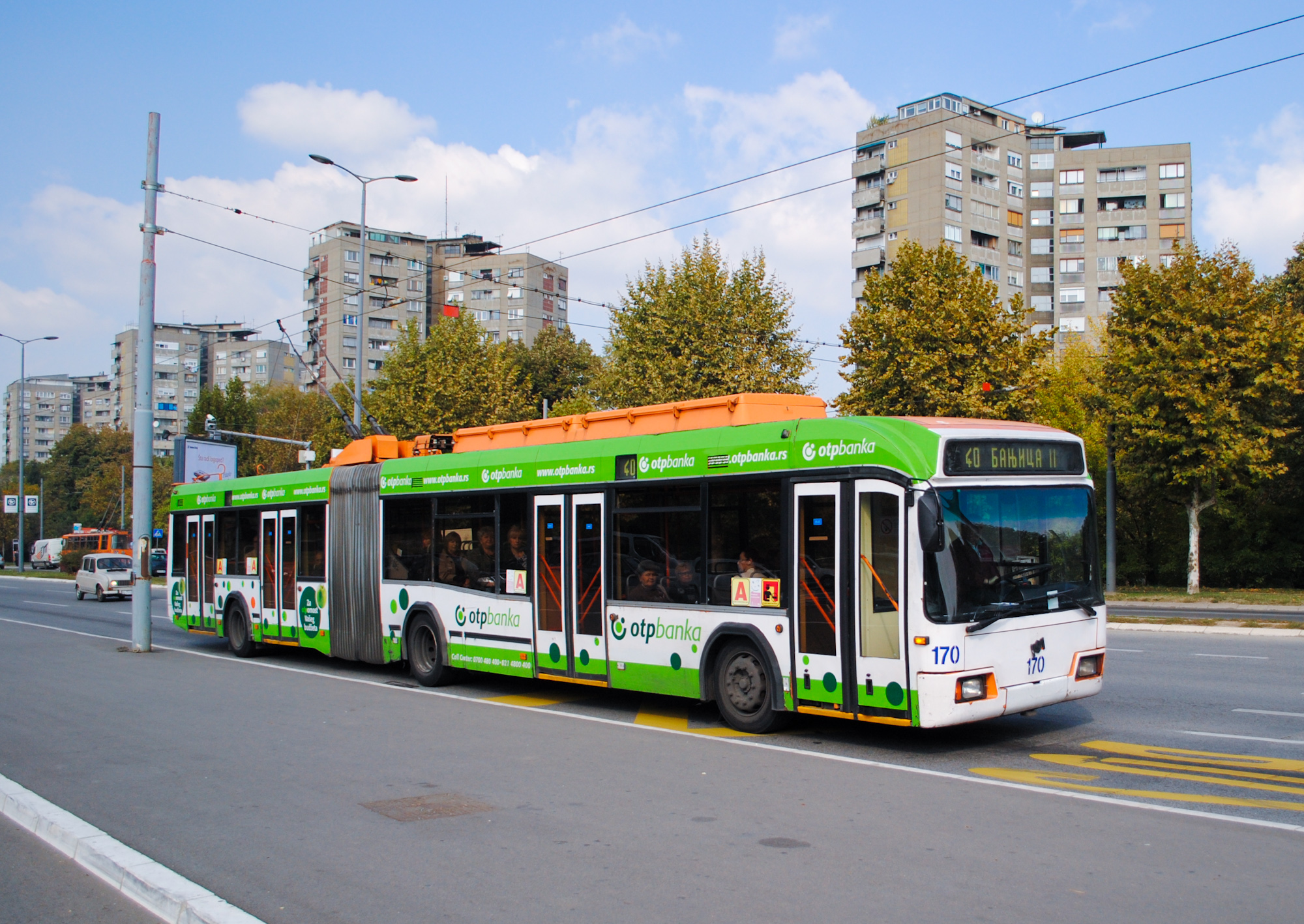
AKSM-333 in Dedinje

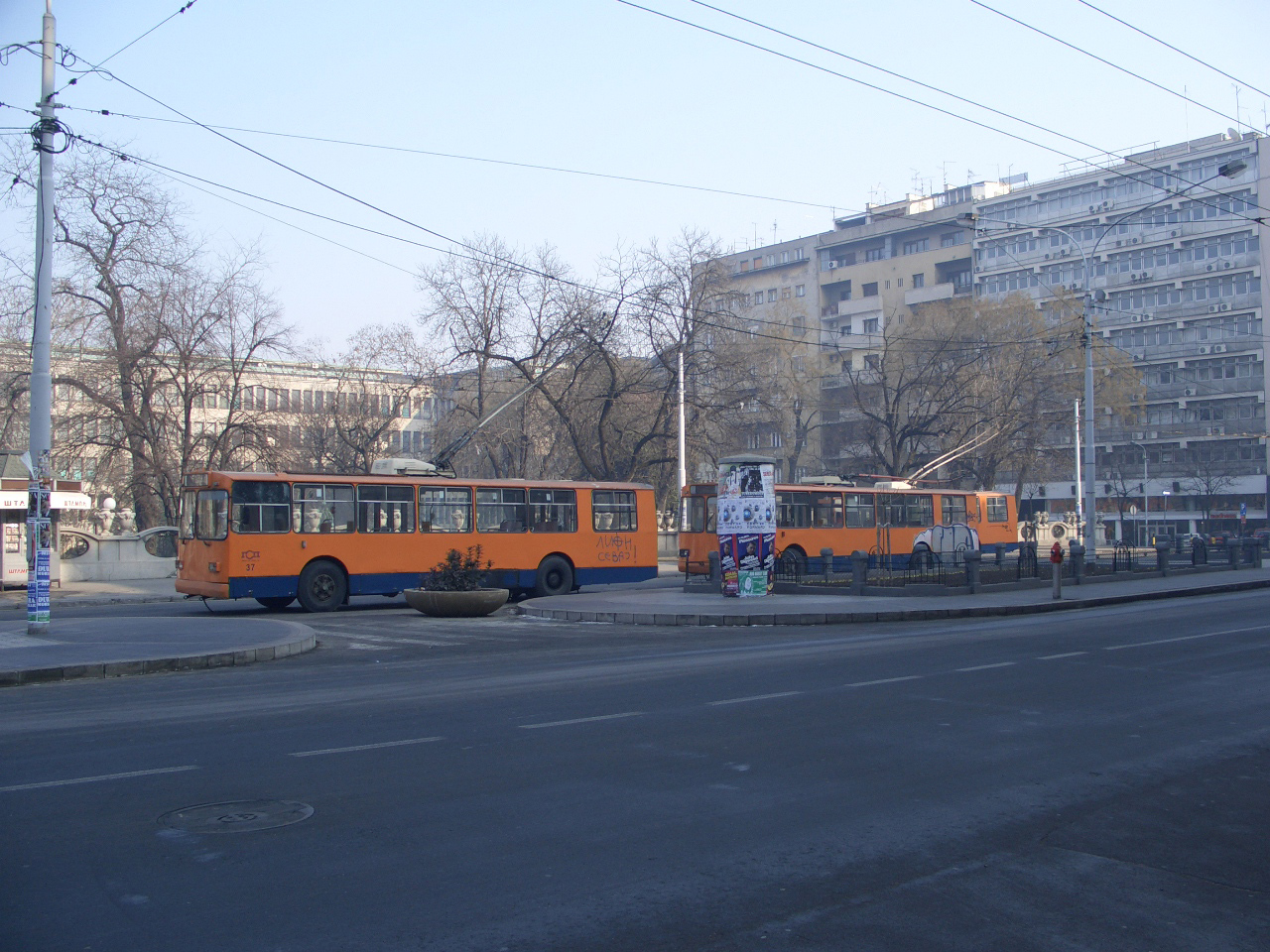
Two ZiU-9 at the Studentski Trg terminus

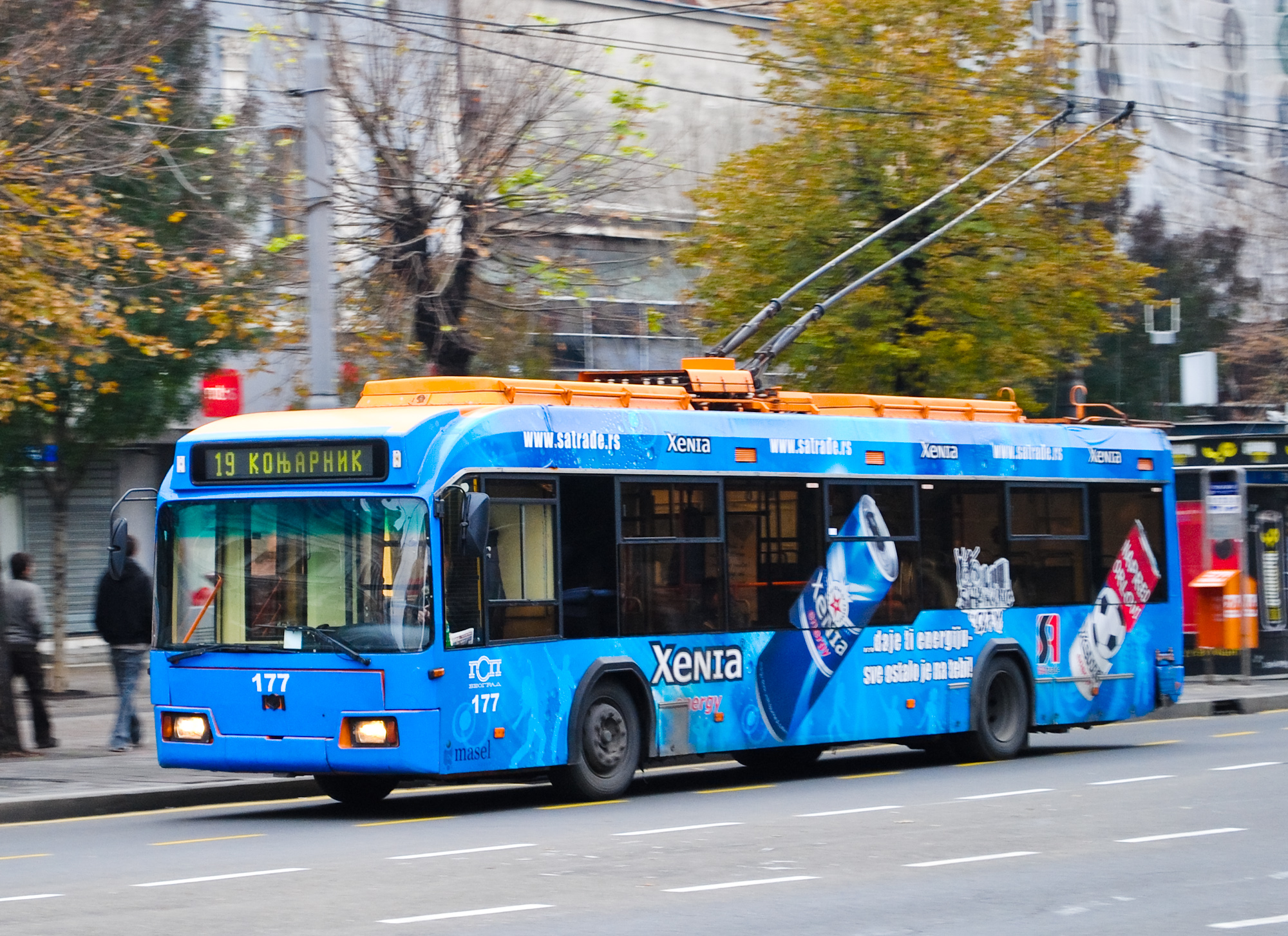
AKSM-321 in the main Kralja Milana street

== See also ==
- Trams in Belgrade
- Transport in Belgrade
