= Bogoslovija, Belgrade =

Bogoslovija Богословија
- Urban neighbourhood
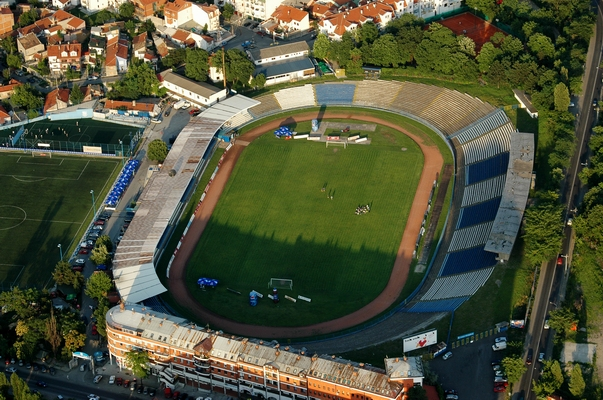
- Omladinski Stadium, stadium of the OFK Beograd
- Etymology: Seminary
- Location within Belgrade
- Coordinates: 44°48′55″N 20°29′30″E
- Country: Serbia
- Region: Belgrade
- Municipality: Palilula / Zvezdara
- Local Community: Hadžipopovac (Palilula); Nadežda Petrović (Palilula); Severni Bulevar (Zvezdara); Stara Karaburma (Zvezdara)

Population (2011)
  - Total: 7,555
- Time zone: UTC+1 (CET)
  - Summer (DST): UTC+2 (CEST)
- Postal code: 11050
- Area code: +381(0)11
- Car plates: BG

Bogoslovija (Serbian Cyrillic: Богословија) is an urban neighborhood of Belgrade, the capital of Serbia. It is mostly located in Belgrade's municipality of Palilula, with some parts belonging to the municipality of Zvezdara.

== Location ==
Bogoslovija covers an area around the University of Belgrade Eastern Orthodox Theology Faculty and the roundabout where the streets of Dragoslava Srejovića, Mije Kovačevića and Severni Bulevar cross paths. It borders the neighborhoods of Karaburma (Stara Karaburma) to the east, Profesorska Kolonija to the west, Palilula (Hadžipopovac) to the southwest, Belgrade New Cemetery to the southeast, and Ada Huja and Viline Vode to the north. Also right to the north are the access routes to the Pančevo Bridge, across the Danube.

== Administration ==
Palilula's section of Bogoslovija is mostly organized as the local community of "Nadežda Petrović" (previously named "29th November"), which had a population of 7,555 in 2011. It also partially belongs to the local community of "Hadžipopovac", also in Palilula, while the Zvezdara section is part of the local community "Severni Bulevar", which comprises a much wider area. In colloquial terms, the eastern section is usually considered a part of Karaburma and the western as a part of Palilula.

== Characteristics ==
Despite several residential buildings, Bogoslovija is mostly an administrative and communal center. The Belgrade Fire Brigade is located here, so as are the facilities of the "City sanitation" service, Hall Aleksandar Nikolić (formerly Pionir Hall), Palilula Police Station (nicknamed White House due to its color), military hospital (VMC) and the Omladinski Stadium, a stadium of the OFK Beograd soccer team. The Cultural Center "Vlada Divljan", former the People's University "Braća Stamenković" is located in the 1948 building, designed by Bogdan Ignjatović. The Secondary School Students’ Home "Milutin Milanković", next to the Hall Aleksandar Nikolić, was founded in 1961.

=== Seminary ===
Central place belongs to the Seminary of the Serbian Orthodox Church with adjoining campus, which was finished in 1957-1958 and gave its name to the entire neighborhood (Serbian: bogoslovija, "seminary"). The complex was designed by Aleksandar Deroko, in the modernist architectural style of the 1930s.

Deroko, with Petar Anagnosti, designed the building in 1938. The projected object was considered a modernist one, because it "expanded outside of the Serbo-Byzantine Revival style" and was described as the representative of the "Late Orthodox Modernism". The red brick, in a subdued manner, emphasized the grey cross which was built into the façade surface.

=== Waste Management Company ===
The communal company "Waste Management" was founded in 1884 and since 1932 is located on the lot, previously known as "Pionir", in the neighborhood. The location at the modern 4 Mije Kovačevića Street, was chosen by the mayor Milutin Petrović. He personally gave the initial design of the complex, including the horseshoe-shaped garage and the stables for the horses. The first objects were built in 1933–1934. The horses were retired from service and fully replaced by the engine vehicles on 26 March 1958.

=== Toblerone Building ===
The most protruding feature in the neighborhood is the skyscraper officially called "Residential Tower Karaburma". Due to its unusual, spikey design it was originally nicknamed the "Hedgehog" or the "Mace of Kraljević Marko", but in time the nickname "Toblerone" stuck, after the Swiss chocolate of the same name.

The building was constructed in 1963, after the Brutalist design of architect Rista Šekerinski. The entry section is paved with black and white marble tiles. In architectural terms, the building almost touches the building of the Seminary, having a "direct dialogue" with it and both buildings are important representatives of their corresponding styles.

Originally, the building sparked controversy, and even more ridicule, due to its triangular terraces design and for being the only high-rise in the wider area ("urban solitary position"). Despite being later seen as the representative of the "estranged Socialist realism", the building was considered having a higher comfortable lodging characteristics, even for modern standards: a wide and direct view over the entire city and the Danube, a fenced backyard, a children's park in the shady lot behind the building and its own parking space. Also, it is close to downtown. As with other monumental buildings in Belgrade, there is a matter of maintenance though, after the 1990s.

In July 2018, MoMA museum opened a 6-month exhibition entitled "Toward a Concrete Utopia" providing visitors with a large collection of images, architectural models, and drawings from Yugoslav architecture in the 1948-1980 period. Among the buildings which were presented as the major representatives of the Brutalist style was the "Toblerone".

== Transportation ==
Historical population
Year	Pop.	±%
1981	9,869	—
1991	10,671	+8.1%
2002	9,426	−11.7%
2011	7,555	−19.8%

The main characteristic is extensive traffic, as it is the crossroad of many streets going in all directions of Belgrade (Karaburma, Zvezdara, Mirijevo, Krnjača, Pančevo, Vukov Spomenik, Square of the Republic, etc. As a result of this, the area of Bogoslovija is one of the most polluted areas in Belgrade (ecological black spot).

=== Roundabout ===
On 7 November 2017 city assembly decided to erect a monument, called "Tripod", in the center of the roundabout. The author of the project is sculptor Kosta Bogdanović and it was funded by the Naftna Industrija Srbije (NIS). The modernist sculpture is 8.5 m (28 ft) tall, weighs 3 tons and is colored in Byzantine blue. It is part of the author's cycle "Byzanthemes". It symbolically represents a trinity and is envisioned as a sort of northern city gate (as there are Eastern City Gate and Western City Gate). The project was planned already in 2009 but the city lacked sufficient funding, until NIS offered to sponsor the project. The monument is made of stainless steel, and due to its size and position, it is visible to the commuters coming from all access roads to the roundabout: Pančevo Bridge, Zvezdara, Karaburma, Mirijevo.

In April 2018 it was announced that the installation will actually protrude out of a fountain which will be built in the center of the roundabout. Preparatory works began in August 2019. The sculpture was placed in September 2019, when it became obvious that the fountain around it won't be built. Initial public reactions to the object, including local residents, were mostly negative, concerning both the practical side (traffic safety) and the visual and artistic one (current vogue of the city administration to place monuments and fountains everywhere).

== Protection ==
In the yard of the "City sanitation" there is a pedunculate oak, planted in 1916. The tree has a normal, regular shape of both the trunk and the crown and presents the excellent genetic potential of that oak species, which is by the city's environment agency considered to be "the most valuable deciduous tree" in Serbia. In order to preserve its biological values, it was declared a natural monument by the city on 21 September 2014. The area under its crown is arranged as the resting area for the employees, with the benches. After an internal referendum in the company, it was named "Čistoćko". The tree has a "twin brother", which is even taller, but it is damaged by the snow and strong winds so it can't be protected.

== Gallery ==
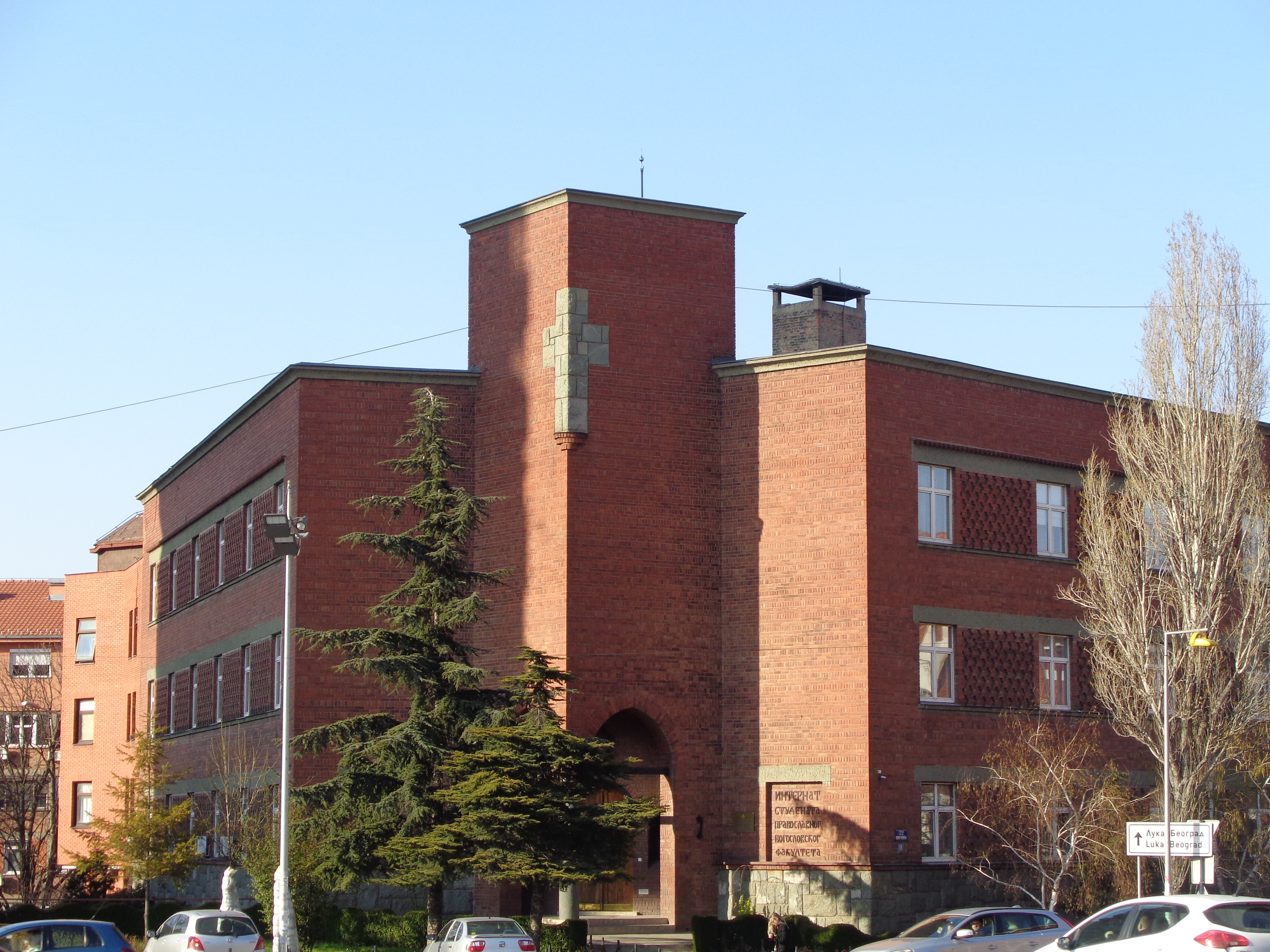
Building of the Seminary, after which the entire neighborhood was named

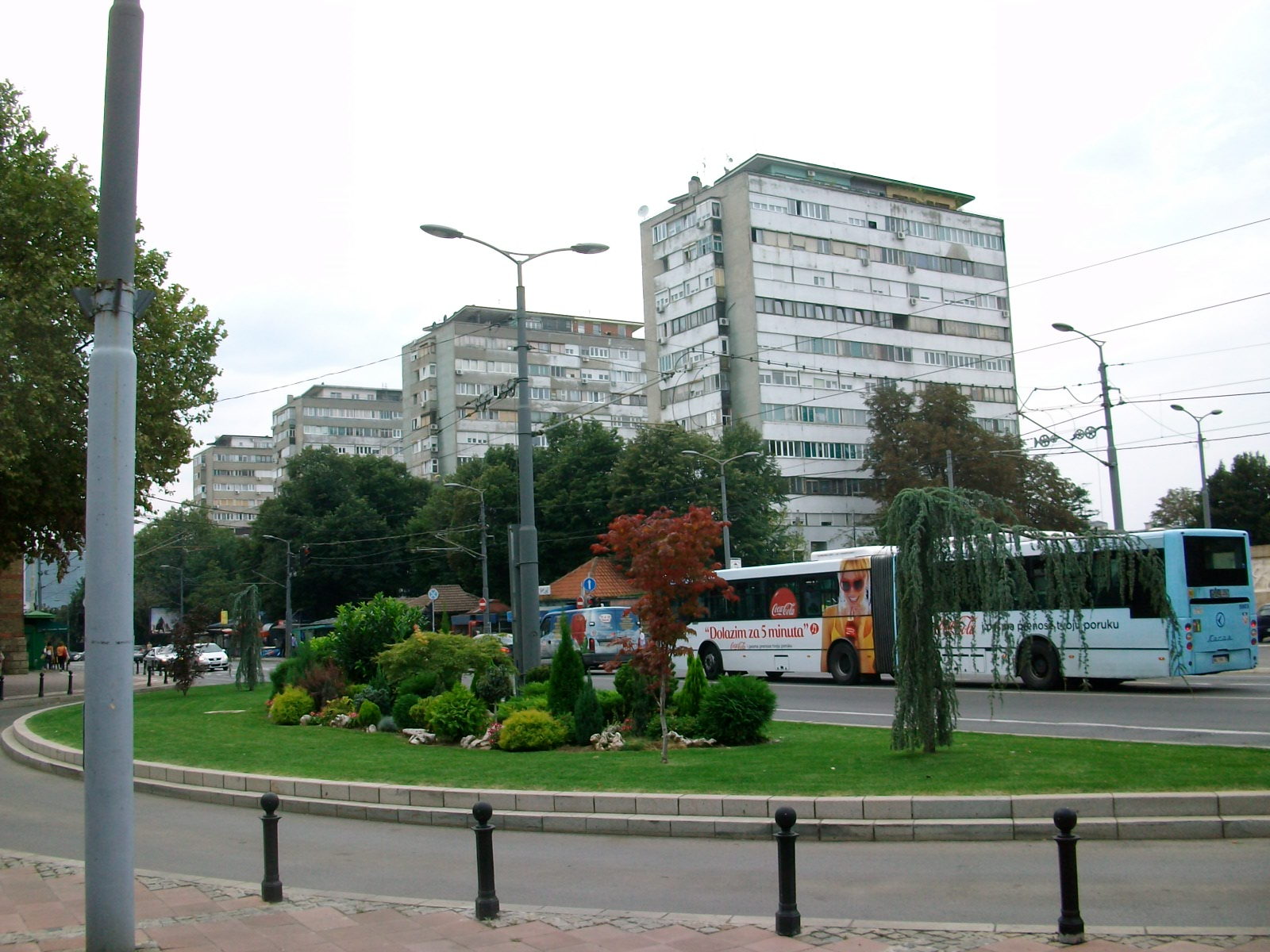
Row of residential buildings close to the Belgrade New Cemetery

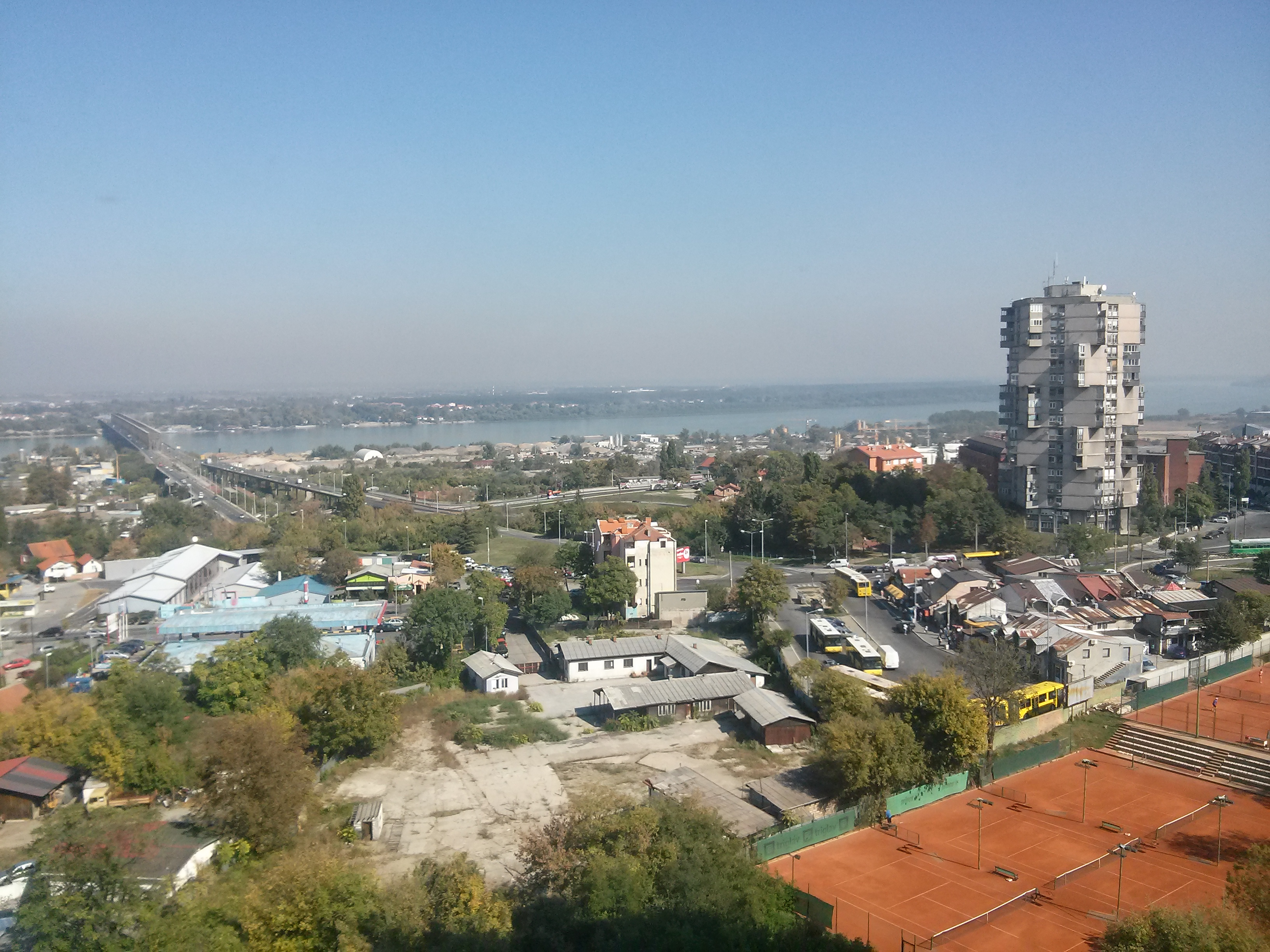
View of the bus terminus, the Pančevo Bridge across the Danube and the Toblerone Building

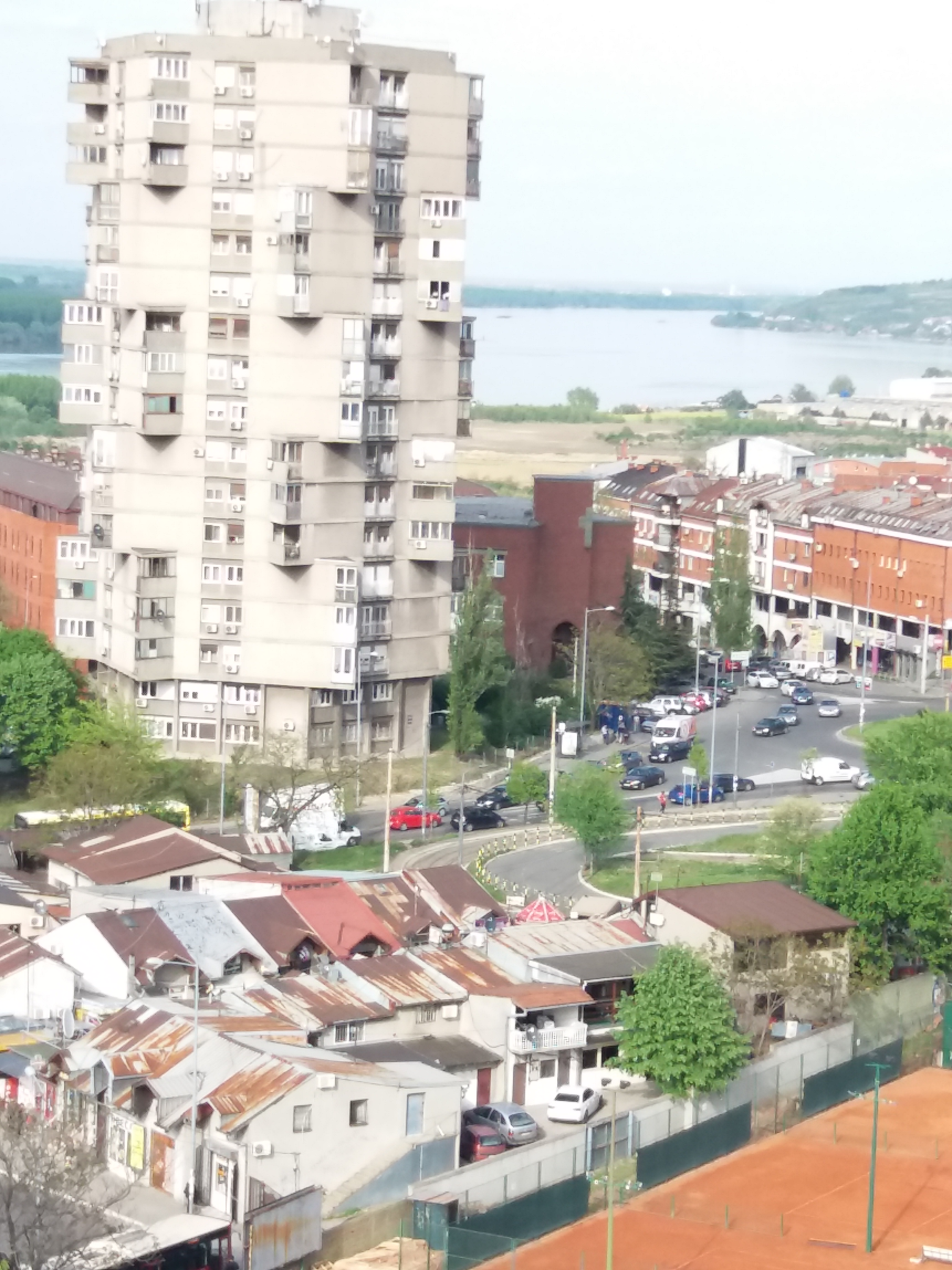
Toblerone Building with the Seminary behind it
