= List of trolleybuses produced by Fiat =

During the 1950s and 1960s, Fiat was the biggest manufacturer of trolleybuses in Italy. The company was partner with body makers such as Cansa, Casaro, Garavini, Macchi, Varesina, Viberti and electrical engine manufacturers Breda, CGE, Marelli and TIBB.

== List ==
- Fiat 461F Materfer CGE
- Fiat 467F Materfer CGE
- Fiat 488F Materfer CGE
- Fiat 635F Varesina Breda
- Fiat 635F Varesina CGE
- Fiat 656F Cansa CGE
- Fiat 656F Garavini CGE
- Fiat 668F Cansa CGE
- Fiat 668F Aerfer TIBB
- Fiat 672F Varesina Breda
- Fiat 672F Viberti CGE
- Fiat 2401 Cansa CGE
- Fiat 2401 Cansa TIBB
- Fiat 2404 Cansa TIBB
- Fiat 2405 Casaro CGE
- Fiat 2405 Casaro TIBB
- Fiat 2405 Macchi CGE
- Fiat 2405 Macchi TIBB
- Fiat 2411 Cansa CGE
- Fiat 2411 Cansa TIBB
- Fiat 2411 Cansa Marelli
- Fiat 2411/1 Cansa CGE
- Fiat 2472 Viberti CGE

== Public transport ==
Fiat trolleybuses served in Italy in cities like Rome, Milan, Turin, Naples and towns like Florence, Cuneo, Verona, Bologna and other.

Outside Italy trolleybuses by Fiat had in: Greece, Croatia, Serbia, Switzerland, Egypt, Turkey, Brazil, Argentina, Uruguay, South Africa, Mexico.
