= Hadžipopovac =

Hadžipopovac Хаџипоповац
- Urban neighbourhood
- Location within Belgrade
- Coordinates: 44°48′37″N 20°29′58″E
- Country: Serbia
- Region: Belgrade
- Municipality: Palilula
- Time zone: UTC+1 (CET)
  - Summer (DST): UTC+2 (CEST)
- Area code: +381(0)11
- Car plates: BG

Hadžipopovac (Serbian: Хаџипоповац) is an urban neighborhood of Belgrade, the capital of Serbia. It is located in Belgrade's municipality of Palilula.

== Location ==
Hadžipopovac is located in the central part of urban section of the municipality. It borders the neighborhood of Paliula to the south, municipality of Zvezdara (neighborhood Slavujev Venac) and Belgrade New Cemetery to the east, neighborhood of Bogoslovija to the north and the neighborhood and municipality of Stari Grad to the west. Hadžipopovac is bordered by the streets of Ruzveltova, Cvijićeva, Zdravka Čelara, Čarlija Čaplina.

== Name ==
The neighborhood was named after the land owned by the old Belgrade family of Hadži-Popović in the area.

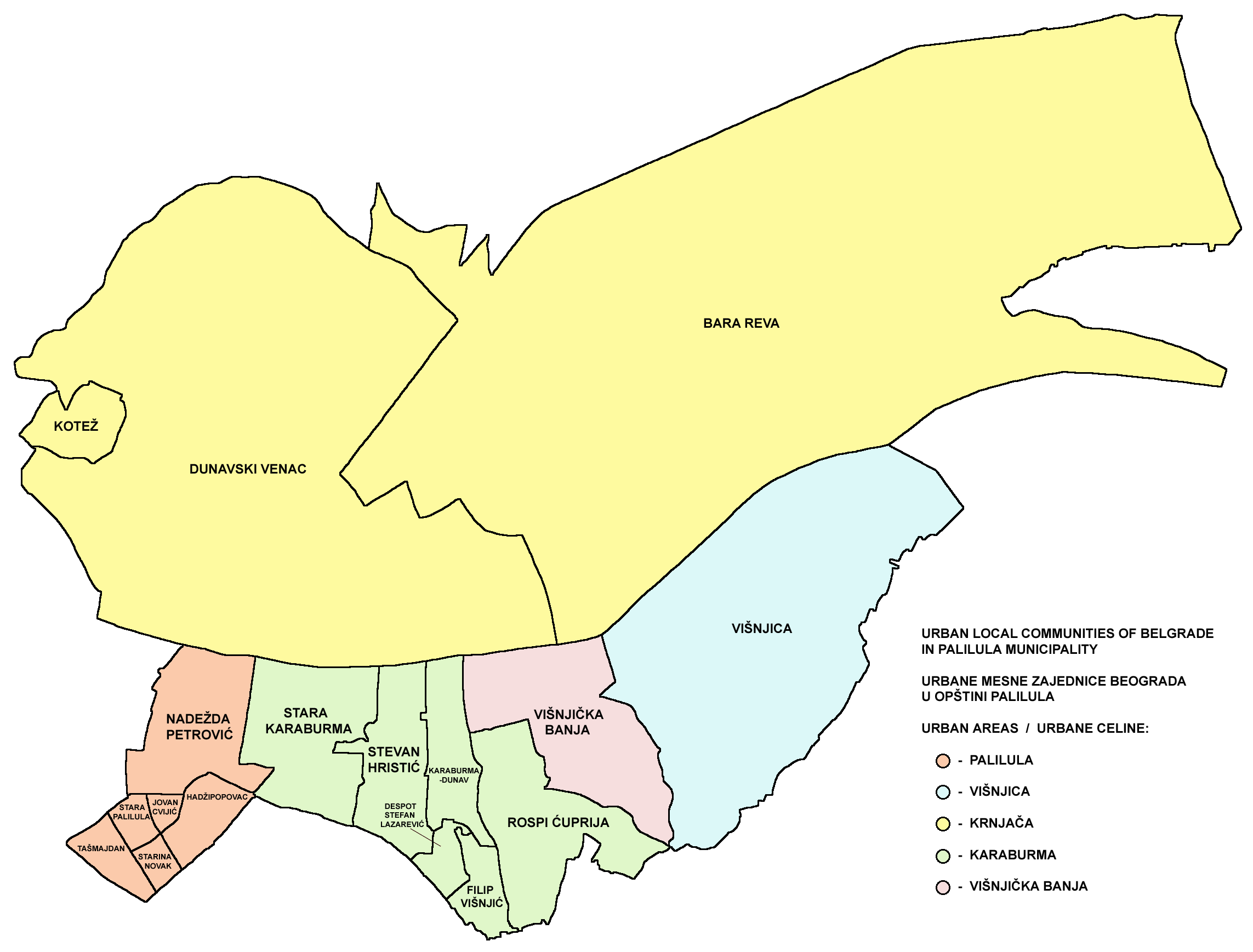
Map of Urban local communities of Belgrade in Palilula municipality

Hadžipopovac
Year	Pop.	±%
1981	5,030	—
1991	4,378	−13.0%
2002	6,219	+42.1%
2011	3,863	−37.9%

== History ==
Southwest border is today set by the Cvijićeva Street, but historically this was the route of the creek of Slavujev potok or Bulbulderski potok (Slavuj or Bulbulder Creek), which flew from the Zvezdara hill into the Danube, east of the present location of the Pančevo Bridge. It is completely conducted underground today, into the sewage system. At the modern corner of the Cvijićeva and Zdravka Čelara, there was a widening, where the creek would overspill and the pond would form. Local population came to the pond for harvesting reeds and shooting ducks.

Historically, until World War I, the area was considered to be the part of Bulbulder, as term was applied to the much wider area than today. It included the entire valley of the Bulbulder Creek with the Veliki Vračar hill, especially its right bank which would today also include Zvezdara Forest, Slavujev Venac, Slavujev Potok, Hadžipopovac and Profesorska Kolonija.

Major changes ensued after 1886 and construction of the Belgrade New Cemetery nearby. The main street which connected the neighborhood to the rest of Belgrade, Grobljanski Put (Cemetery Road, later street; renamed to Ruzveltova in 1946) became much busier. In 1893, a tram line of public transportation was conducted through the street. Originally assigned No. 3, it was later changed to No. 8 and in 1949 it became No. 13. Because of this, a small bridge was built over the creek in the 19th century, on the route of the Grobljanska Street. Original wooden bridge was replaced with the stone one in 1929. The bridge was replaced mainly to make easier access to the cemetery, further down the Grobljanska Street. Old bridge was often getting covered in ice during the winter and numerous accidents were recorded.

Apart from the Grobljanska Street, the second most important street in this part of town, opposite to the Grobljanska, was cut through by this time, too. Northern section which leads to Hadžipopovac and Profesorska Kolonija, to the Đušina Street, was named Slavujska, while the southern was named Bulbulderska. Name change was proposed for the northern section which reached Profesorksa Kolonija, so it was renamed to Cvijićeva, after the professor and scientist Jovan Cvijić. Two main streets were meeting, but not crossing each other, being cut off from each other by the bridge. Works on the overpass, which allowed the crossing, were finished in December 1930.

A string of new or expanded neighborhoods encircled eastern outskirts of Belgrade after World War I. The inspiration for the design of the neighborhoods came from the complex built in 1912 along the Daviel Street in Paris. It consisted of 40 one-floor houses with gardens, indented from the main street. This style became very popular across the Europe. This included Hadžipopovac which fully developed in this time.

In this period, at 35 Grobljanska Street, the bus company of Ljubiša Perišić, which maintained the bus line in the neighborhood, built vast garage for its vehicles. It later became known as the Ford Garage. In the early 1941, before World War II began in Yugoslavia, the bus line No. 28 was established, which connected City Hospital (today KBC Zvezdara) to Theatre Square in downtown Belgrade, via Hadžipopovac and Profesorska Kolonija. The Ford Garage was burned down by the members of Communist youth organization SKOJ in the night of 26/27 July 1941, as the occupational German forces kept parked vehicles here.

After the war, the Ford Garage was adapted into the facility of Automobilsko Beograd company. It was completely demolished later and the shopping mall Zira Center was built instead. It was opened in 2007, while the adjoining Zira Hotel followed in May 2008.

Pedestrian square in Zdravka Čelara Street was adapted into the park which covers (0.13 hectares (0.32 acres).

After World War II it was the eastern border of the city, today it is kilometers away from the eastern border of Belgrade.

== Characteristics ==
The local community of Hadžipopovac had a population of 3,863 in 2011. Administrative name of the local community until the 2000s was "Oslobodioci Beograda".

At the corner of the Cvijićeva and Ljube Didića streets, there is a "Park Jovan Cvijić", which is the smallest official park in Belgrade. It developed in the 1960s, when the surrounding residential complex was also built. It covers an area of 1,420 m^{2} (15,300 sq ft).

Railway-Technical High School is in the neighborhood, at 14 Zdravka Čelara Street. Originally named Railway Transportation School, it was moved in 1963 from Zemun to its present location. Hadžipopovac has one elementary school, "Oslobodioci Beograda". A lot of neighborhood children also go to elementary school "Vuk Karadžić" which is on a border of Hadžipopovac and Stari Grad. There is a lot of cafes, bars and taverns in Hadžipopovac.

Old and famous tavern in this neighbourhood is "Kosmaj", at 105 Cvijićeva Street.

== Profesorska Kolonija ==
Profesorska Kolonija
Year	Pop.	±%
1981	3,792	—
1991	3,636	−4.1%
2002	3,306	−9.1%
2011	2,634	−20.3%

Roughly, eastern section of Hadžipopovac borders with the neighborhood of Profesorska Kolonija (Serbian: Професорска колонија). It has newer buildings than the rest of Hadžipopovac which is a cause for the popular quarrels between those who consider them inhabitants of Hadžipopovac and those from Profesorska Kolonija. Name of the neighborhood is Serbian for "Professors' colony".

The neighborhood developed during the Interbellum. It was originally mostly inhabited by the families of the Belgrade University professors and of members of the Serbian Royal Academy, hence the name. The University handed the lots to their professors so that they could build houses and even served as the guarantor for professors' mortgage credits. Among the founders of the neighborhood were 23 doctors of science and 15 members of the Serbian Royal Academy.

The base for the drafting of the urban concept and construction of the neighborhood was Belgrade's general urban plan from 1923. The basic design, which was followed almost to the letter during the construction, was that of a garden city. Prior to urbanization, the area consisted of agricultural fields and orchards, which the state was purchasing and then handing them over to the University. Profesorska Kolonija was built from 1926 to 1927, in the area which was formerly considered the northernmost extension of Bulbulder. It was bounded by the streets of Knez Miletina (today Despota Stefana Boulevard), Mitropolita Petra and Zdravka Čelara, and by the Bulbulder Creek which used to flow through the neighborhood before the urbanization. However, the creek continued to flood the area, especially after heavy rains, cutting off the neighborhood completely from downtown. The drainage network was constructed and the creek was conducted underground by 1933. In 1927, the bus line of public transportation was established, which connected Profesorska Kolonija section with the Belgrade Main railway station. The former creeks route is today the Cvijićeva Street.

Similarly, but not entirely in the same vein, in the 1930s several other "colonies" were built on Belgrade's outskirts: Činovnička Kolonija in Voždovac (Clerks' colony; most resembling the Profesorska Kolonija in terms of architecture), Železnička Kolonija on Topčidersko Brdo (Railway colony) or Radnička Kolonija at Topovske Šupe, near Autokomanda (Workers' colony). Unlike its counterparts, Profesorska Kolonija by the 2020s for the most part managed to keep its original appearance. There are certain urban additions which are considered "failed" in comparison to the original architecture, but Profesorska Kolonija remained a neighborhood of pre-war villas with green, lush yards and gardens.

The Memorial Museum of Nadežda and Rastko Petrović, a former house of Ljubica Luković, cousin of Nadežda and Rastko Petrović, is located in the neighborhood and declared a cultural monument. The House of Milutin Milanković, at 9 Ljubomira Stojanovića street, where the scientist Milutin Milanković lived, is also in the neighborhood. Milanković himself projected the house which was later declared a cultural monument, too. Villa Prendić, built in 1932-1933 and designed by Milan Zloković was also declared a cultural monument, in March 2020. One of the most representative edifices of Modern architecture in Belgrade, it is located at 20 Osmana Đikića Street and faces the park. It was built for Jovan Prendić and his wife Dragojla Prendić, and originally also served as the medical office.

There are several pedestrian squares, adapted into parks: between the streets Ljubomira Stojanovića, Stojana Novakovića and Kopernikova (0.22 hectares (0.54 acres)), Osmana Đikića (0.13 hectares (0.32 acres)), and Čarlija Čaplina and Jaše Prodanovića (0.19 hectares (0.47 acres)).

Apart from the individually protected objects, in 2020, the entire neighborhood was placed under the protection as the cultural monument, or the spatial cultural-historical unit, which preserved its basic, authentic characteristics. On three sides, the protected area is narrower than the neighborhood itself, covering the old core, while on the western side it extends across the Cvijićeva Street, all the way to the Takovska Street. Borders of the preservation area are the streets Mitropolita Petra, Čarlija Čaplina, Braće Grim, Ljubomira Stojanovića, Cvijićeva, Đušina, Draže Pavlovića, Takovska, Cvijićeva again, Bulevar Despota Stefana and Sterijina. Total protected area covers 10.77 ha (26.6 acres).

Profesorska Kolonija is administratively organized as the local community of "Jovan Cvijić" which had a population of 2,634 in 2011.
