= Alfa Romeo 140AF =

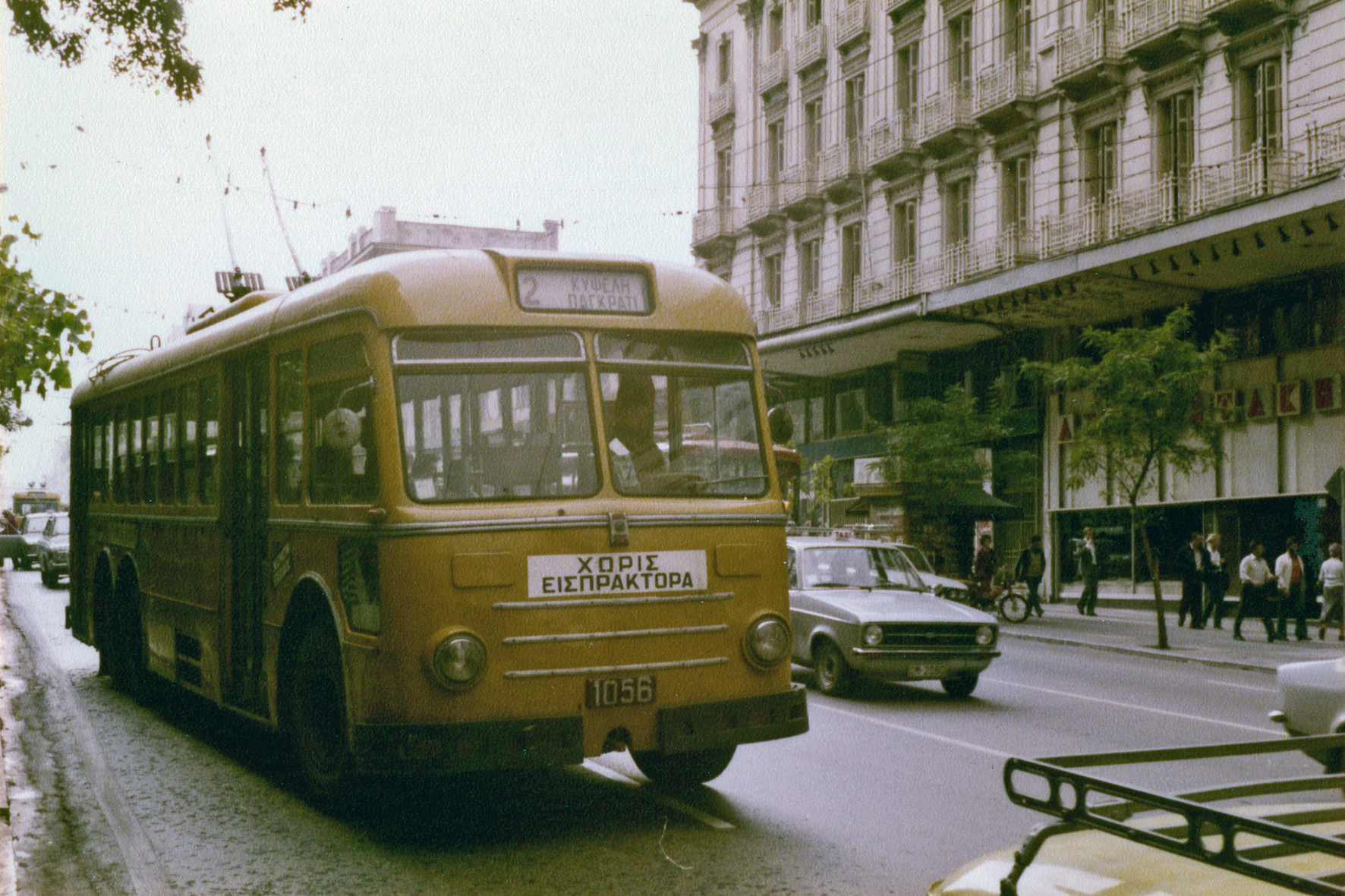
- Athens: 1979 Alfa Romeo 140AF Casaro CGE, ILPAP n. 1056

Overview
- Manufacturer: Alfa Romeo

Alfa Romeo 140AF is an Italian trolleybus produced from 1949 to 1960.

== History ==
This trolleybus helped make Alfa Romeo quite popular as a manufacturer of public transport vehicles, especially trolleybuses. The 140AF was very popular in Italy during the 1950s. This trolleybus was produced in around 20 different versions. The technical characteristics of the different versions of the 140AF were similar but the design and appearance was quite different.

The bodies used for the trolleybuses were manufactured by Breda, SIAI Marchetti-CGE, Macchi-Marelli, Stanga-TIBB, CRDA-TIBB, Pistoiesi and Caproni.

== Technical characteristics ==
The 140AF vehicles used TIBB GLM 1303c, Marelli MCT 60B (MCT 64 B 56 per i filosnodati), CGE CV 1216 oppure CV 1227 A motors. Different versions had 135, 160 or 163 hp engines.

== Transport ==
In Italy the 140AF trolleybuses were used in Rome, Milan, Turin, Genoa, Bologna, Florence, Como, Bari, Ancona, Catania, Trieste, Palermo and Salerno. In Greece the 140AF was used in Athens. They were also in service in Belgrade, Serbia.

== See also ==
- List of buses
- List of trolleybus manufacturers
- Alfa Romeo Trolleybuses
