= Byzantine blue =

Color

Color coordinates
- Hex triplet: #3457D5
- sRGB^{B} (r, g, b): (52, 87, 213)
- HSV (h, s, v): (227°, 76%, 84%)
- CIELCh_{uv} (L, C, h): (42, 103, 262°)
- Source: seniorart.com.au
- ISCC–NBS descriptor: Vivid blue
- B: Normalized to [0–255] (byte)

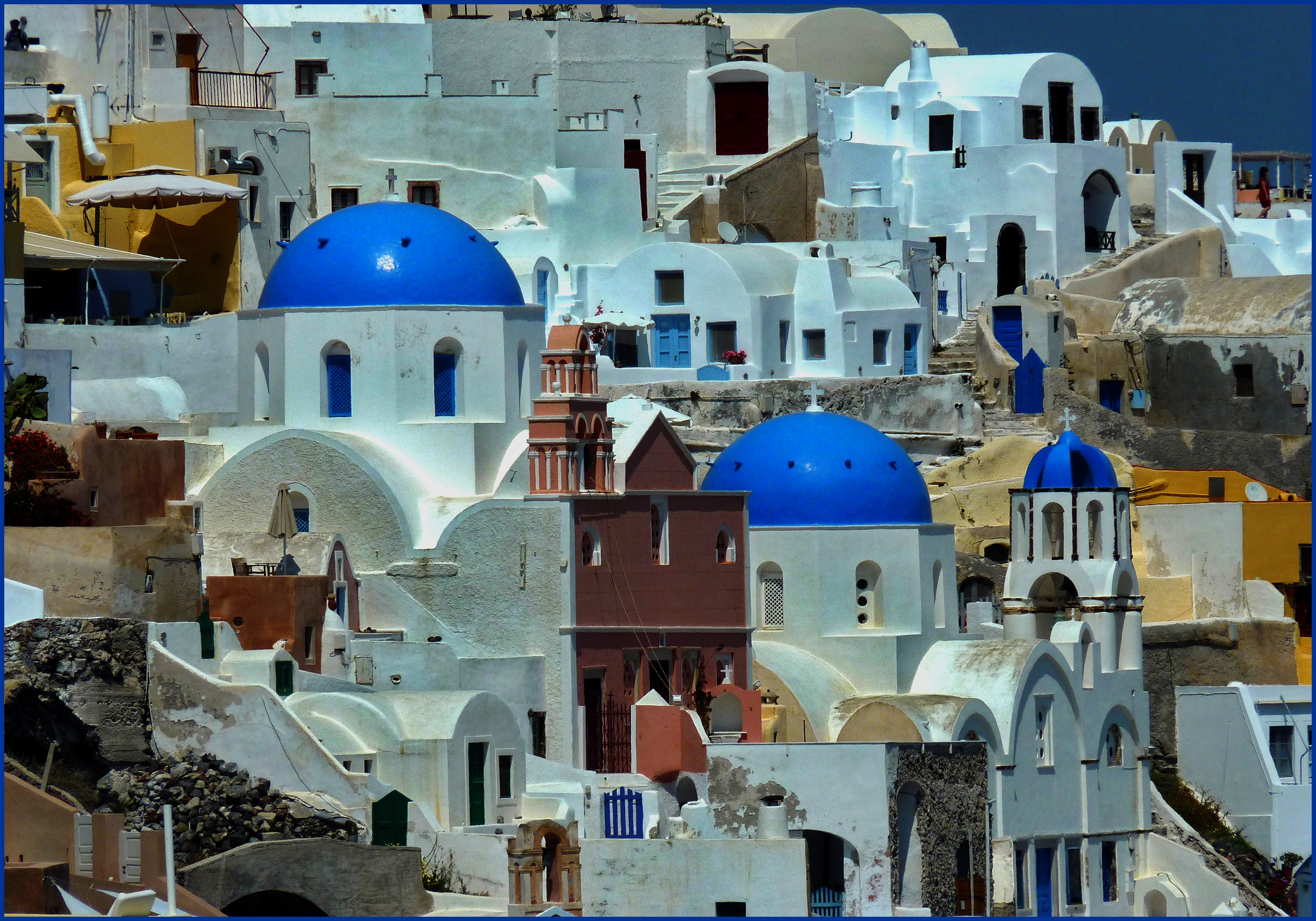
Greek blue, Santorini

Byzantine blue is a color ranging from light celestial blue or lazuli to dark Egyptian blue.

== Variations ==
=== Dark Byzantine blue ===
The dark variation is best described as the color of the Byzantine night sky; it resembles dark blue-grey, Prussian and Navy blue, well attested on frescoes and mosaics.

Dark Byzantine blue

Color coordinates
- Hex triplet: #2A2F4D
- sRGB^{B} (r, g, b): (42, 47, 77)
- HSV (h, s, v): (231°, 45%, 30%)
- CIELCh_{uv} (L, C, h): (20, 22, 261°)
- Source: art-paints.com
- ISCC–NBS descriptor: Dark purplish blue
- B: Normalized to [0–255] (byte)

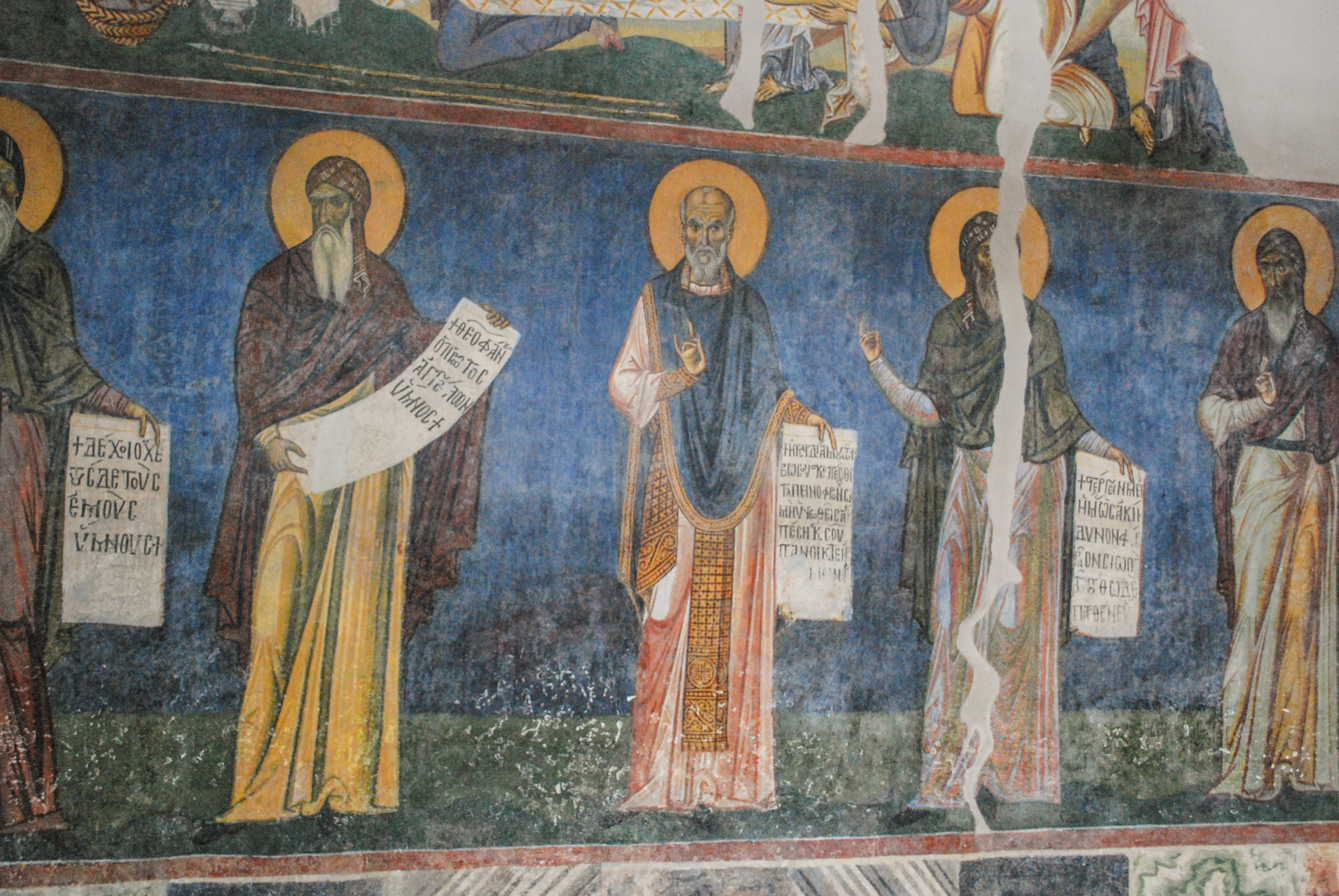
Blue of Nerezi (Nebesko plavo)
