= House of Milutin Milanković =

Coordinates: 44°48′56″N 20°28′43″E

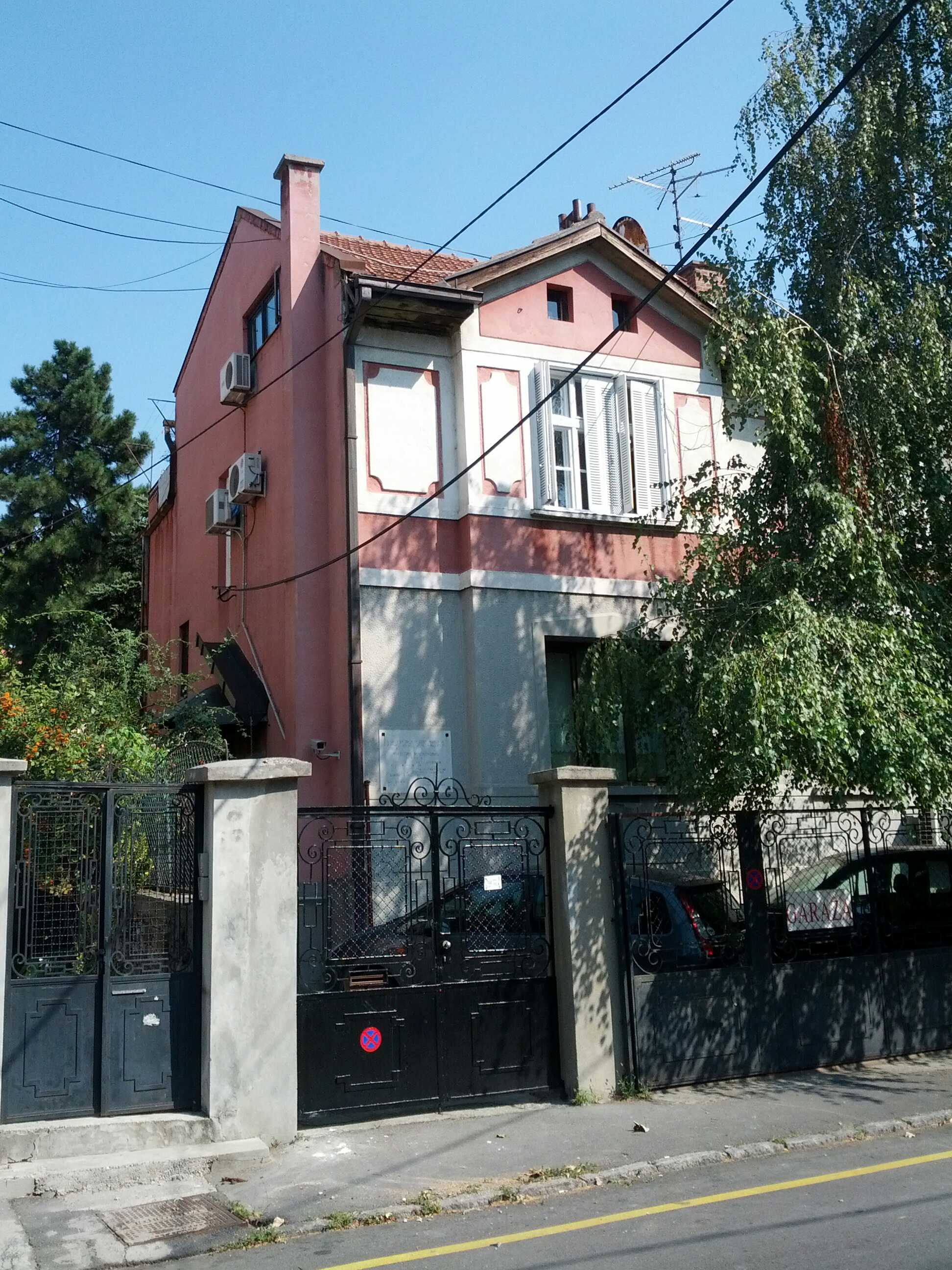
- House of Milutin Milanković

General information
- Type: Cultural monument
- Location: Palilula
- Town or city: Belgrade
- Country: Serbia
- Completed: 1927.

House of Milutin Milanković is a сultural monument in Serbia. It is located in Belgrade, in the municipality of Palilula, at 9 Ljubomira Stojanovića Street.

The house was built in 1927 under the then newly formed "Professor's Colony". From 1926, in the area of the colony, residential buildings were erected with favourable loans of the Treasury and at first, the owners of the houses were exclusively associated with the University of Belgrade.

The Professor's Colony with the radial streets system and semicircular square followed the current urban planning ideas in the third decade of the 20th century, and the idea of garden cities. The colony supposed, apart from the unified allotment, relatively unified type of buildings as well. Most of the buildings in the Professor's Colony were created on the basis of standardized projects which were built by the architects Svetozar Jovanović, Mihailo Radovanović and Petar Krstić at the beginning of 1926.

The project of the house of Milutin Milanković was also signed by the architects Jovanović, Radovanović and Krstić. This is a modest villa, it was similar to other houses in the area of Professor's Colony. The facades were simple, but in terms of architectural and urban value, it represents the exponent of the idea of colonies or garden cities.

The maximum value of the house lies in the fact that Мilutin Milanković (1879–1958) lived in it, a famous person not only of Serbian but also of world science, professor, academician whose interests ranged from mathematics, through building construction and reform of the Julian calendar, to the famous geophysical theory, such as the astronomical theory of the glacial era. A crater on the Moon was named after him, in his honour, as well as an asteroid in the Solar System. Today, the only testimony that Milutin Milanković lived and worked in the house is a memorial plaque, since the heirs do not live in it.

== See also ==
- List of cultural monuments in Belgrade

== Literature ==
- (Serbian) House of Milutin Milanković in the Catalogue of immovable cultural property of the City of Belgrade (http://beogradskonasledje.rs)
