= Garavini =

Garavini is an Italian surname. Notable people with this name include the following:

- Fausta Garavini (born 1938), Italian writer and translator
- Sergio Garavini (1926 – 2001), an Italian politician, writer and trade unionist

== See also ==
- Carrozzeria Garavini
