= Novi Dvor =

Palace in Belgrade, Serbia

Coordinates: 44°48′36″N 20°27′48″E

- Нови двор
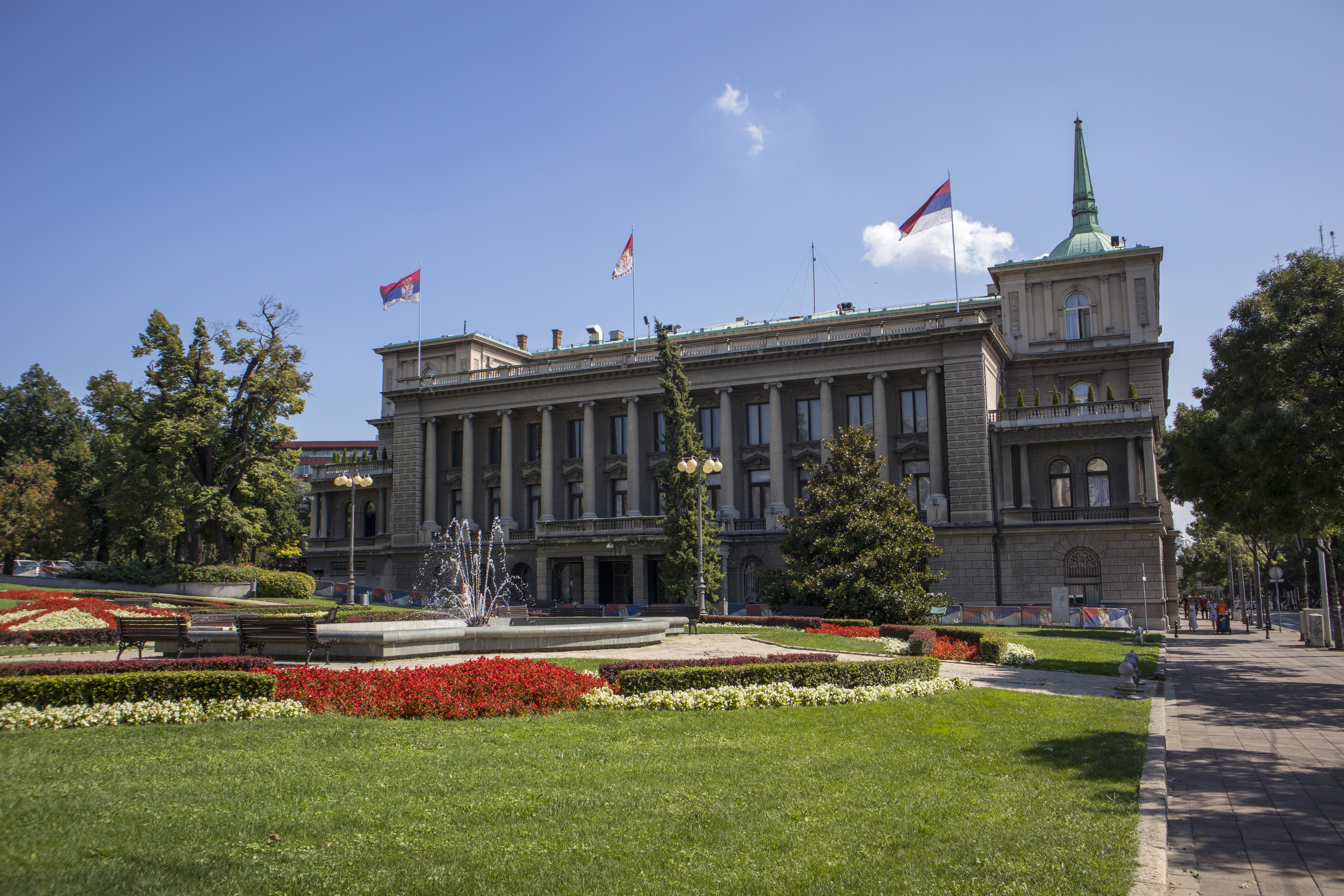
- Front view and main entrance

- Location in Belgrade

General information
- Architectural style: Renaissance Revival; Baroque Revival
- Location: Belgrade, Serbia
- Construction started: 1911
- Completed: 1922

Design and construction
- Architects: Stojan Titelbah; Momir Korunović

The Novi Dvor (Serbian Cyrillic: Нови двор, lit. 'New Palace') is the seat of the president of Serbia. It was a royal residence of the Karađorđević dynasty of Kingdom of Yugoslavia from 1922 to 1934. The palace is located on Andrićev Venac in Belgrade, opposite Stari Dvor (Belgrade City Hall).

== History ==
=== Royal residence ===
Plans for a new royal residence emerged after the assassination of King Alexander I in 1903 and the demolition of the Stari Konak a year later. The new king Peter I resided at the Stari Dvor, which had never been used as a residence but as a venue for state ceremonies and events. Since Stari Dvor was unsuitable for the royal family's permanent living, it seemed natural to think of constructing a new one.

The construction of the new royal palace for Crown Prince Alexander, based on a design by Stojan Titelbah, a prominent Serbian architect of the early 20th century, was announced in 1911. It was to be built at the corner of the Kralja Milana and Dobrinjska (today Andrićev Venac) streets. Subsequently, Dvor sa Kulama was demolished, when the leveling of the lot began. The cornerstone was ceremonially laid on 14 September 1911, and consecrated by the Serbian metropolitan Dimitrije.

Titelbah personally supervised the construction, and Novi Dvor is the only known work he did as an architect of the Ministry of Construction. The facade was erected in 1912, and the communal works were done by 1913. By 1914, the construction works were finished, and the wood joinery installation began on the eve of World War I. The building suffered substantial damage during the war, especially during the 1915 Austro-Hungarian bombing. Occupying Austro-Hungarian army used the building to host soldiers and the woodworks was completely destroyed as it was used for heating. In 1918, during the withdrawal of the occupying army, the building was further damaged.

After the war, a thorough rebuilding was needed, not only architectural, but also of waterworks, plumbing, wirings, heating, etc. Reconstruction was conducted under the supervision of a special commission which also oversaw the renovation of Stari Dvor. Among the members of the commission, which was in charge of the entire work on the new royal residence, were the painter Uroš Predić and the architects Petar Popović and Momir Korunović. Reconstruction began in 1919 and the major works were finished in 1921. Works on the interiors began in June 1921, and were finished in May 1922, few days before the royal wedding of King Alexander I and Queen Maria. Novi Dvor was the official royal residence from 1922 to 1934, when the royal family moved away from downtown to the newly built Kraljevski Dvor in more secluded Dedinje neighborhood.

=== Prince Paul Museum ===
King Alexander I assigned in 1934 Novi Dvor to the Royal Museum, subsequently renamed the Museum of Prince Paul, opened in 1936. The Museum was one of the most important cultural institutions in the Kingdom of Yugoslavia and the contemporaries rated it among the most modern European museums. On the ground floor were exhibited prehistoric, ancient and medieval artifacts; the first floor was assigned for monuments of national culture and 19th-century Yugoslav art; on the second floor was the collection of contemporary European art, in which domestic artists occupied an important place. The Novi Dvor housed the Prince Paul Museum until 1948, when, under a Communist rule, it was assigned a different role.

=== Seat of the President of the Republic ===
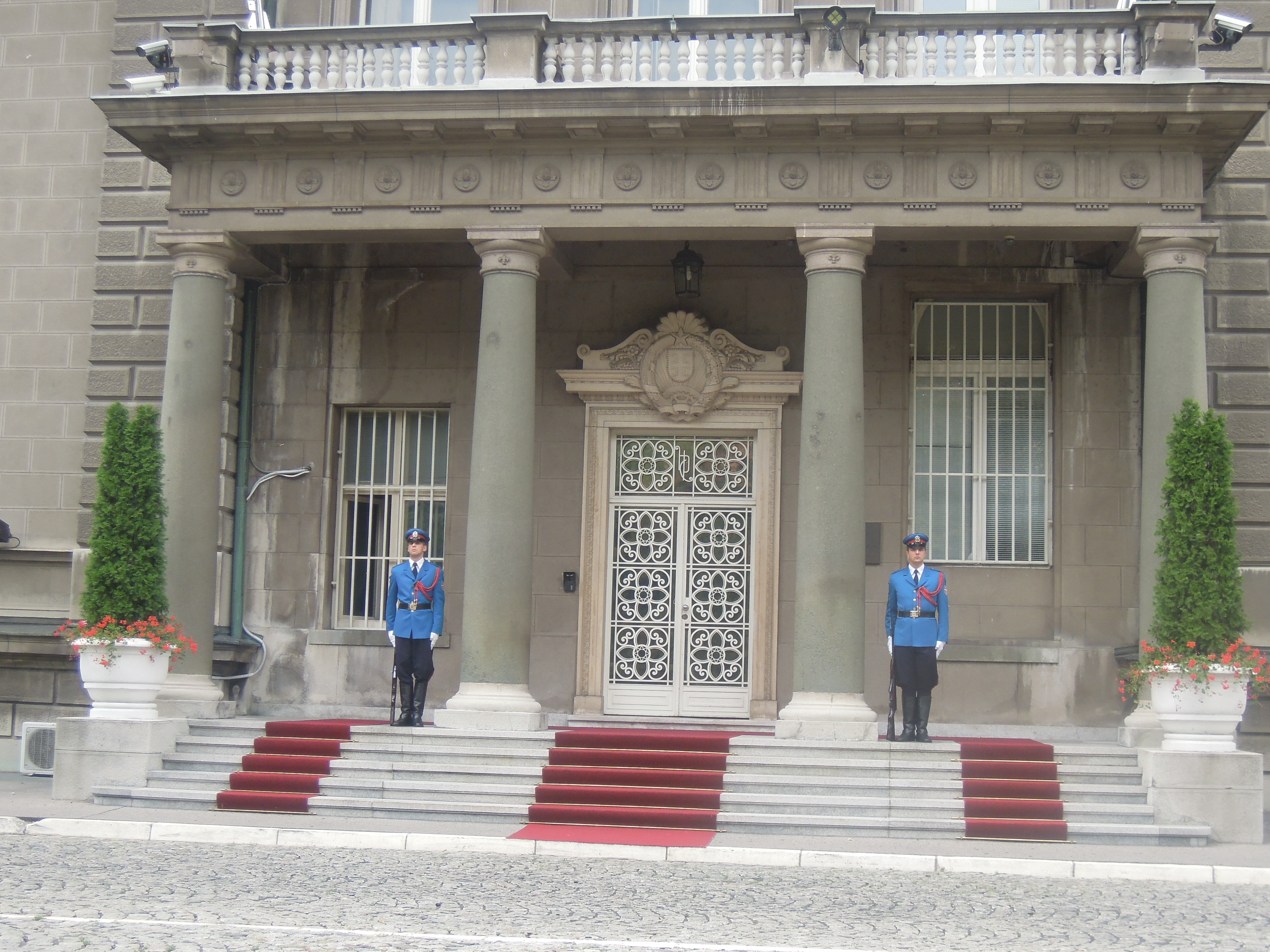
Honor Guardsmen of the Guard of the Serbian Armed Forces at the northern entrance

After the World War II, the reconstruction and new use of both Novi Dvor and Stari Dvor served the broader objective of transforming the former royal palace complex into the administrative seat of the People's Republic of Serbia. To connect the former palace complex with the House of the National Assembly, the fence was removed, the Maršalat building torn down and the palace garden turned into a public Pioneers Park. In 1948–53 Novi Dvor was restyled and extended to a design by the architect Milan Minić to accommodate the Presidency of the Government of the People's Republic of Serbia. It received an assembly hall with a vestibule, the facade opposite Stari Dvor was given a completely different front dominated by a two-store colonnade of ionic columns, while the original frontage lines along Kralja Milana and Andrićev Venac streets remained unchanged. Consistent with the alterations, a new access to the east, park-facing side of the building was provided; and the heraldic symbols were replaced with emblems symbolising the new, republican, form of government. In decorating the interior, special attention was paid to the addition, which was adorned with works of distinguished Yugoslav painters and sculptors, such as Toma Rosandić, Petar Lubarda, Milo Milunović, etc. Since 1953 Novi Dvor has successively housed the highest government institutions of Serbia: the Executive Council of the People's Republic of Serbia, the National Assembly of the People's Republic of Serbia, the Presidency of the Socialist Republic of Serbia and, for the longest period of time, the Office of the President of the Republic of Serbia. Nowadays, Novi Dvor forms part of one of the most valuable heritage areas in the historic core of Belgrade.

== Architecture ==
=== Exterior ===
The main problem for Titelbah was the stylistic harmony of the new structure with the three decades-old Stari Dvor. Turning to historicism, he designed the garden facade with the elements from the renaissance and baroque. He envisioned the towers with domes, but they were not built. Laid out as an architectural counterpart of Stari Dvor, the new royal residence historically supported the earlier concept of a palace complex, highlighting the need for rounding off spatially and symbolically a whole that connoted the very idea of the state. The three store building was designed in the style of academism with elements borrowed mostly from Renaissance and Baroque architecture. The most imposing facade faced the garden, and the corner took the form of a domed tower similar to the solution used for Stari Dvor. The horizontal facade division showed a rusticated semi-basement, the ground floor and the first floor integrated into one central composition, and an independently and more unassumingly treated second floor.

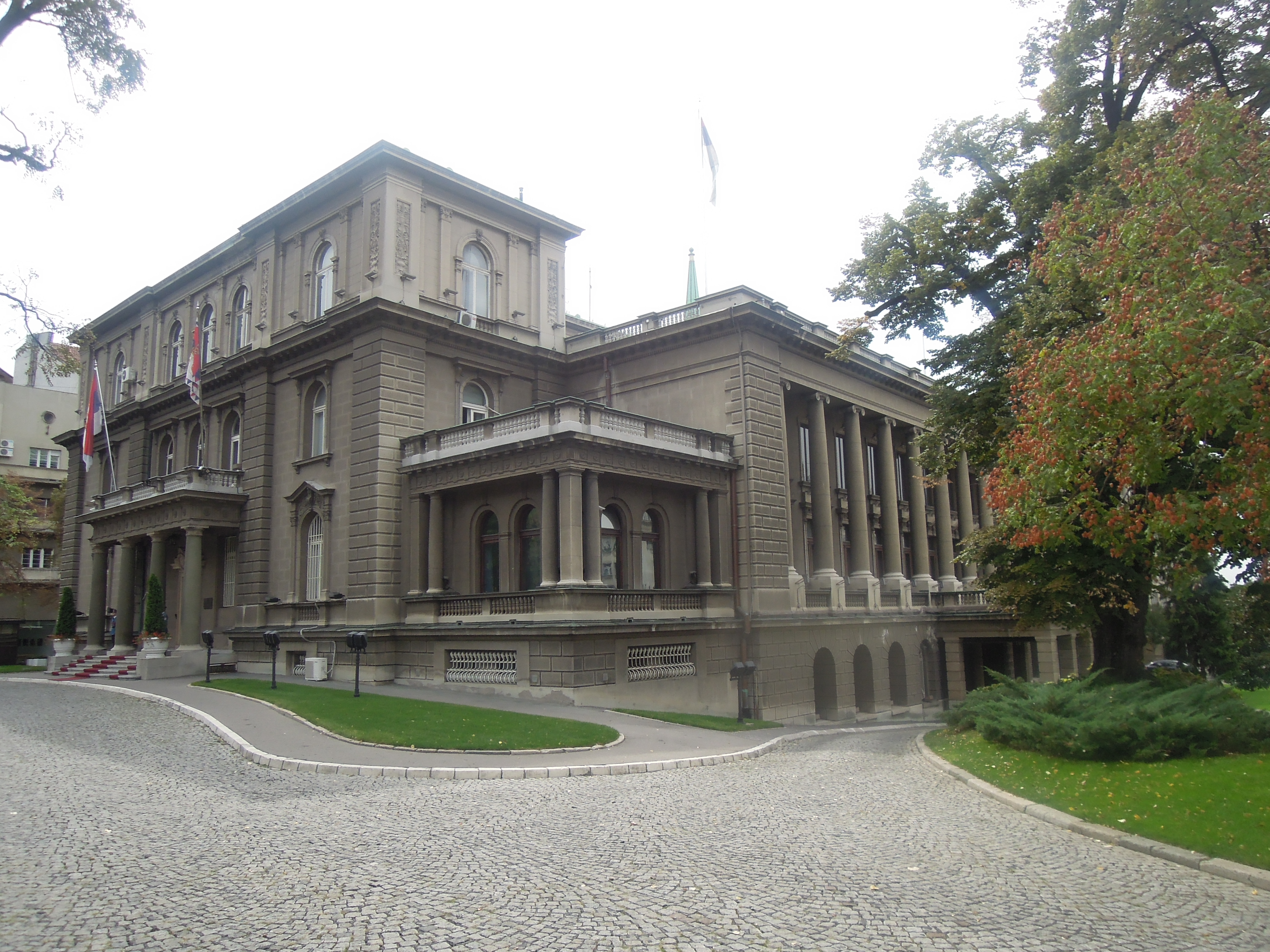
Northern facade

The articulation of the main facade was achieved by a central and two end projections, and a curved, centrally positioned entrance porch. In accordance with the purpose of the building, special attention in ornamenting the façades was paid to heraldic symbols. The semicircular pediment above the cornice of the central projecting bay contained the full armorial achievement of the royal house of Karađorđević. The tallest and, consequently, dominant element of Novi Dvor – the tower capped with a dome tapering into a spire topped by a bronze eagle rising – provided the architectural link between the facades facing Kralja Milana and Andrićev Venac streets. Another important heraldic composition was placed just beneath the dome of the corner tower: two identical, symmetrically placed shields with a cross between four fire-steels, i.e. an element of the coat-of-arms of the Kingdom of Serbia, which subsequently was incorporated into the coat of arms of the Kingdom of Yugoslavia. The central motif of the façade facing Andrićev Venac was the curved projecting bay whose attic was surmounted by a monumental ornamental composition featuring the coat of arms in the centre.

An integral part of the palace complex and the element that related Novi Dvor and Stari Dvor to one another was the fence with gates and sentry boxes, which separated the royal palaces and gardens from Kralja Milana Street. A similar role was played by the Maršalat building whose enlargement and facade remodeling in 1919-1920 was carried out by the architect Momir Korunović in such a way as to ensure consistency to the complex in style and layout. The gates in the form of triumphal arches with relief ornamentation and heraldic symbols, the Maršalat building with two curved wings, and the parterre-type royal gardens with a fountain between the two palaces, gave the complex a formal and stately appearance.

=== Interior ===
In 1911, King Peter I personally ordered to interior design from the German husband and wife designers August and Elsa Bosse, from Weimar. After working on it for two years, they compiled the two-volume album with 50 aquarelles, 65 drawings and 6 large blueprints. The luxuriously covered album is 1 by 1 m (3 ft 3 in by 3 ft 3 in), made of special Japanese paper, and weighs 80 kilograms (180 lb). The Bosses were in constant contact with the king, who endorsed the designs and paid for it. The album was to be sent to Serbia in the summer of 1914, but the World War I broke out. It is not known why the king didn't ask for the album after the war, but he was already too ill and died before the mansion was fully finished.

The ground floor contained a reception hall, a dining room and, in the portion looking on Kralja Milana Street, a suite for the accommodation of state guests, while the two upper floors were intended as the royal family's private quarters. As the blueprints did not set aside a space for a kitchen, the kitchen was housed in an adjacent Šumadija-type house connected with the semi-basement of the palace by a tunnel.

All of the interior decoration, including the sumptuous furniture, was done by the French firm Bézier, which was selected by the crown prince Alexander. Instead of the plain, German style, quite the opposite, exuberant style was applied. Special attention was paid to the interior design of the vestibule, the Reception Hall, the Dining Room, the Bosnian Room, the Japanese and English saloons and the private suites of the King and Queen.

== Gallery ==
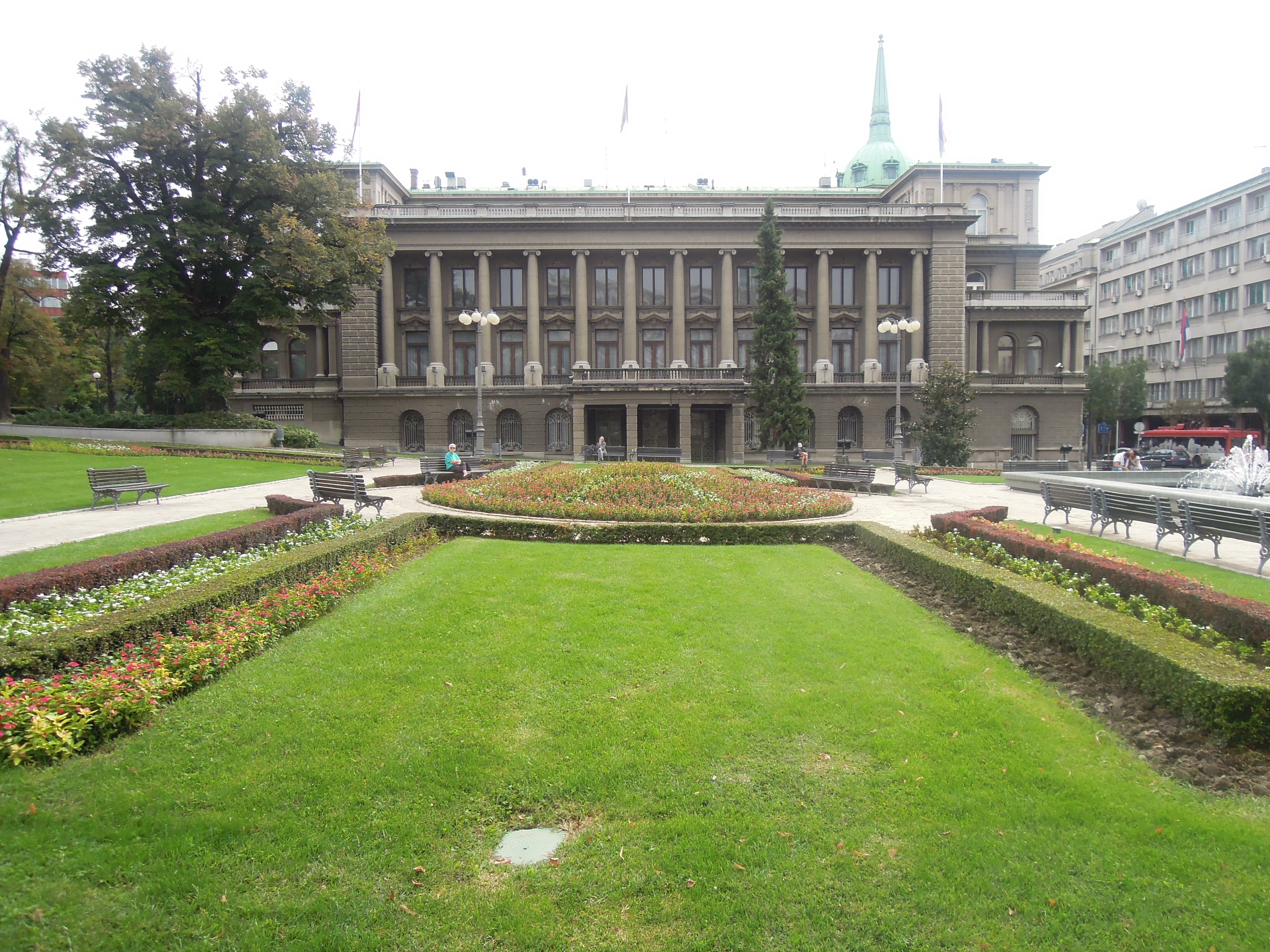

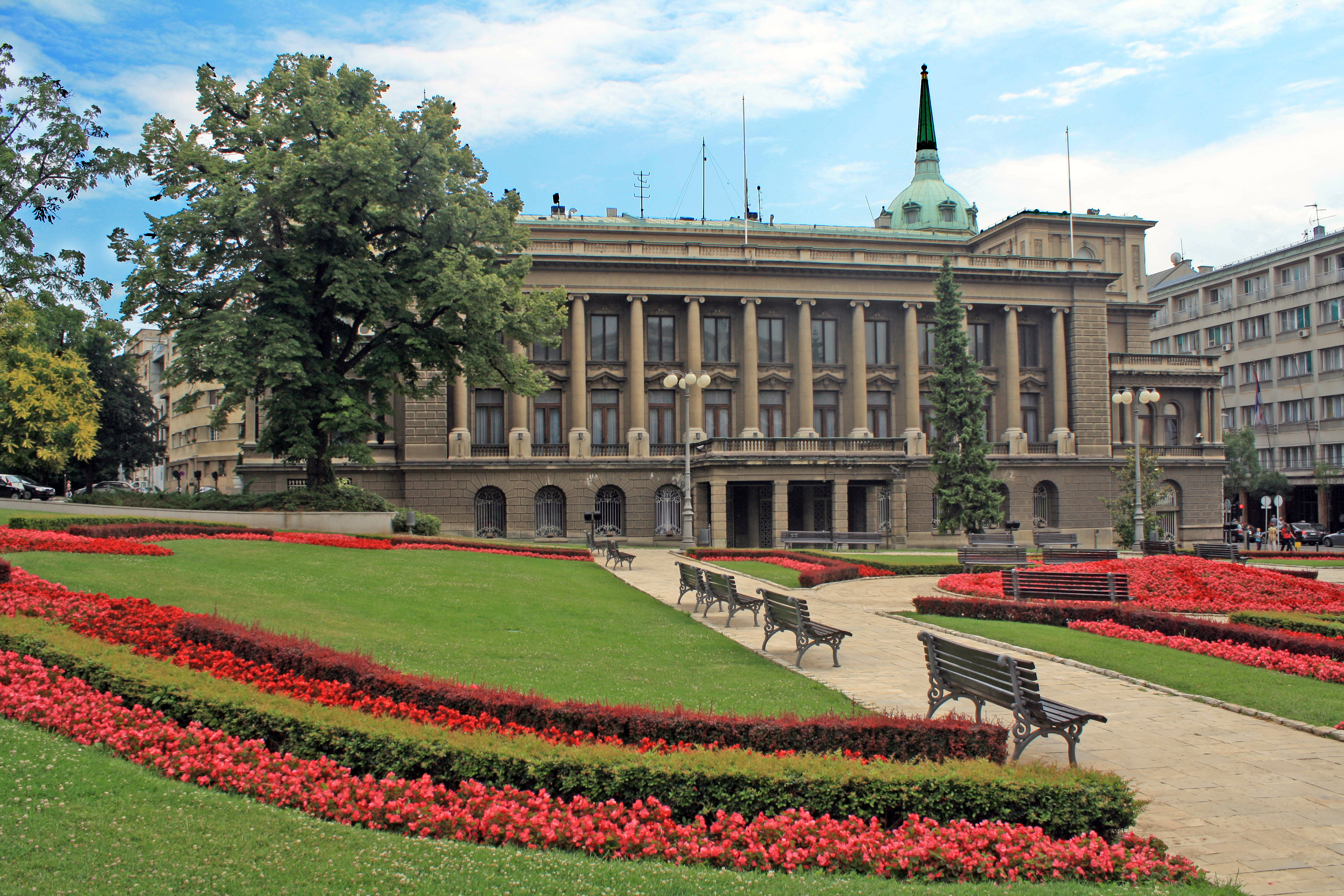

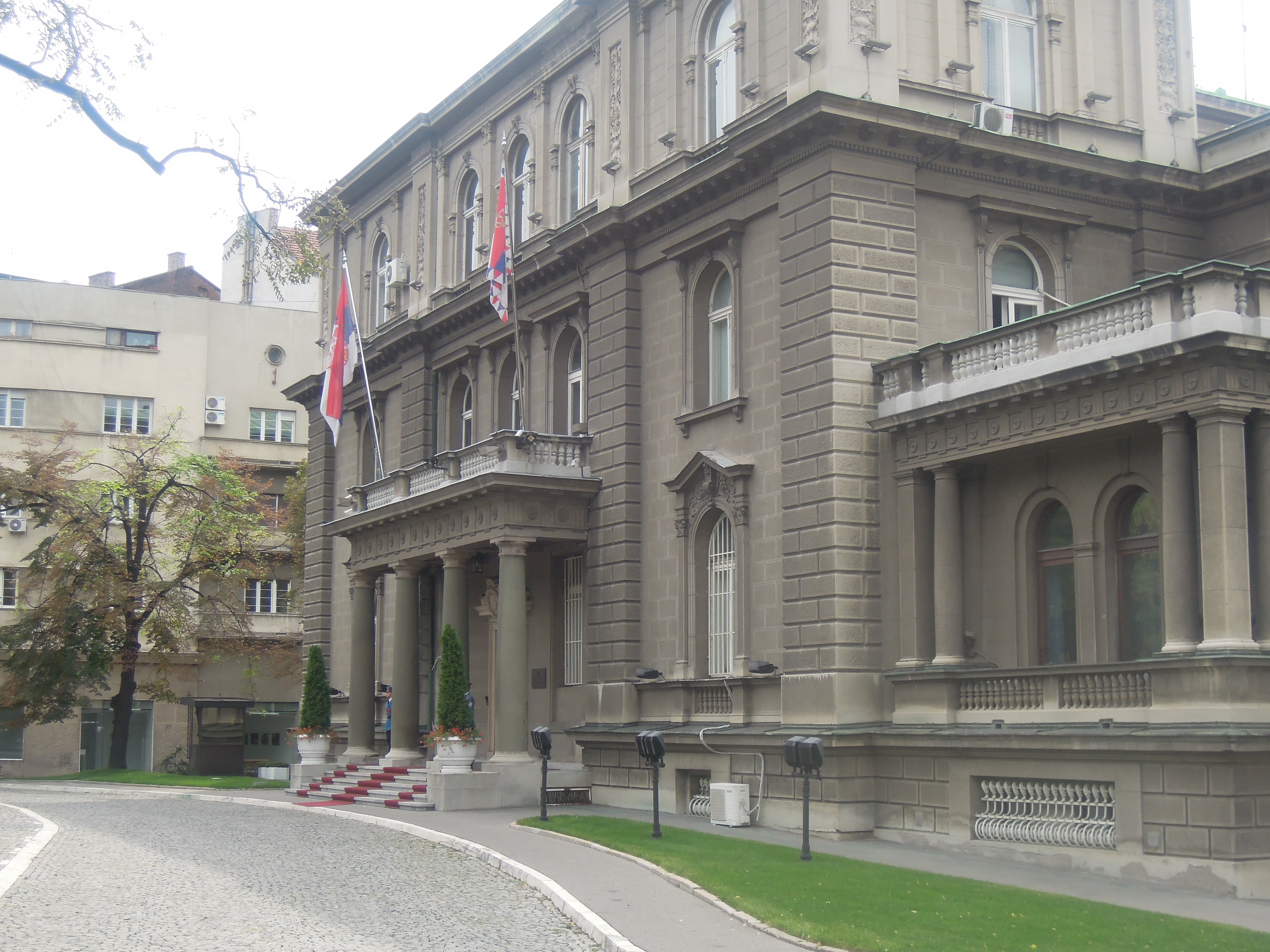

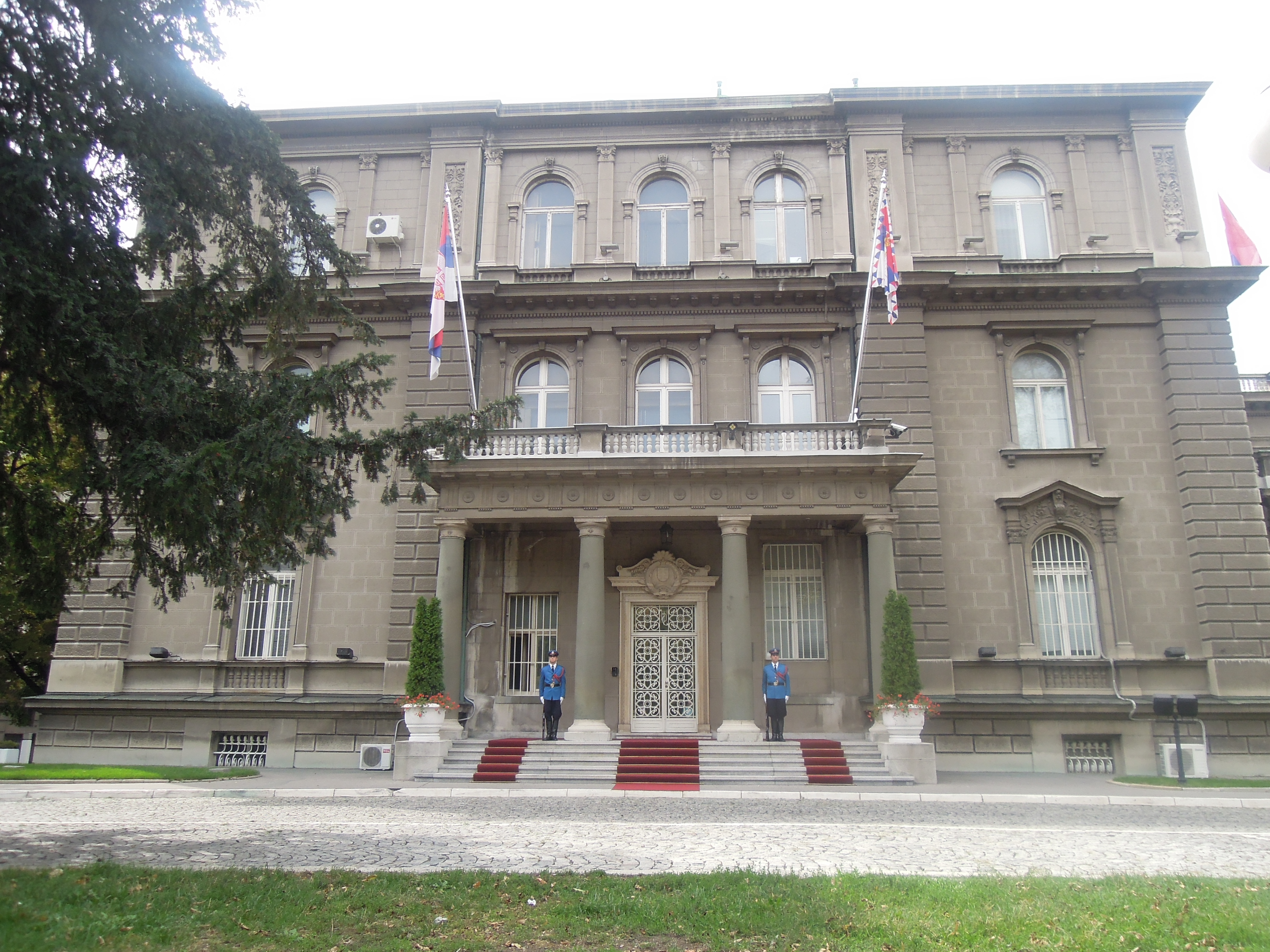

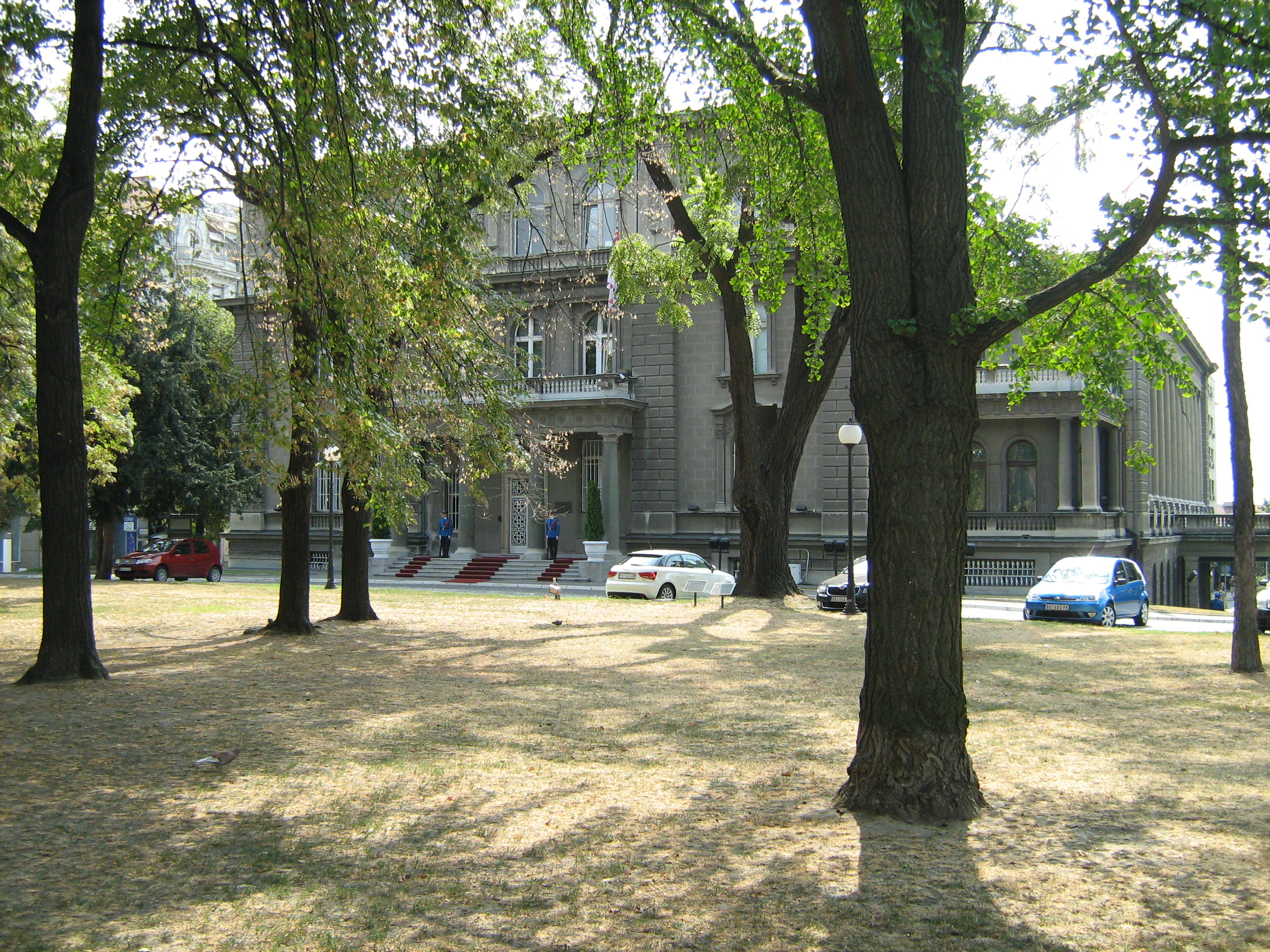

== See also ==
- List of Serbian royal residences
- List of official residences of Serbia
