= Dedinje Royal Compound =

Complex of former royal residences in Belgrade, Serbia

Coordinates: 44°45′56″N 20°27′13″E

The Dedinje Royal Compound (Serbian: Дворски комплекс на Дедињу, romanized: Dvorski kompleks na Dedinju) is a complex of former royal residences commissioned by and built with the personal funds of King Alexander I in the Dedinje neighborhood of Belgrade, Serbia, between 1924 and 1937.

The Dedinje Royal Compound covers an area of 134 hectares covered with parks and contains two residences: Kraljevski Dvor and Beli Dvor; as well as a small Thatched House and service buildings (kitchens, garages, guards barracks).

The compound is owned by the Serbian state and since 2001 has been managed by the Kraljevski Dvor Fund under the direction of the Crown Prince Alexander.

== Kraljevski Dvor ==
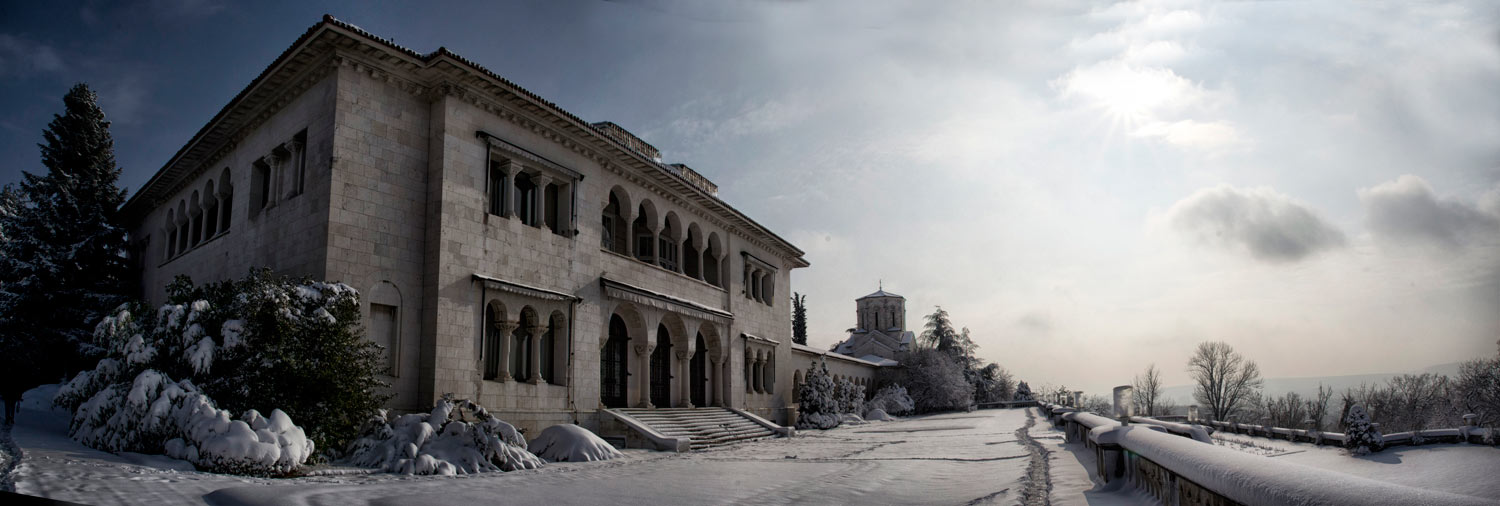
Kraljevski Dvor and the Royal Chapel

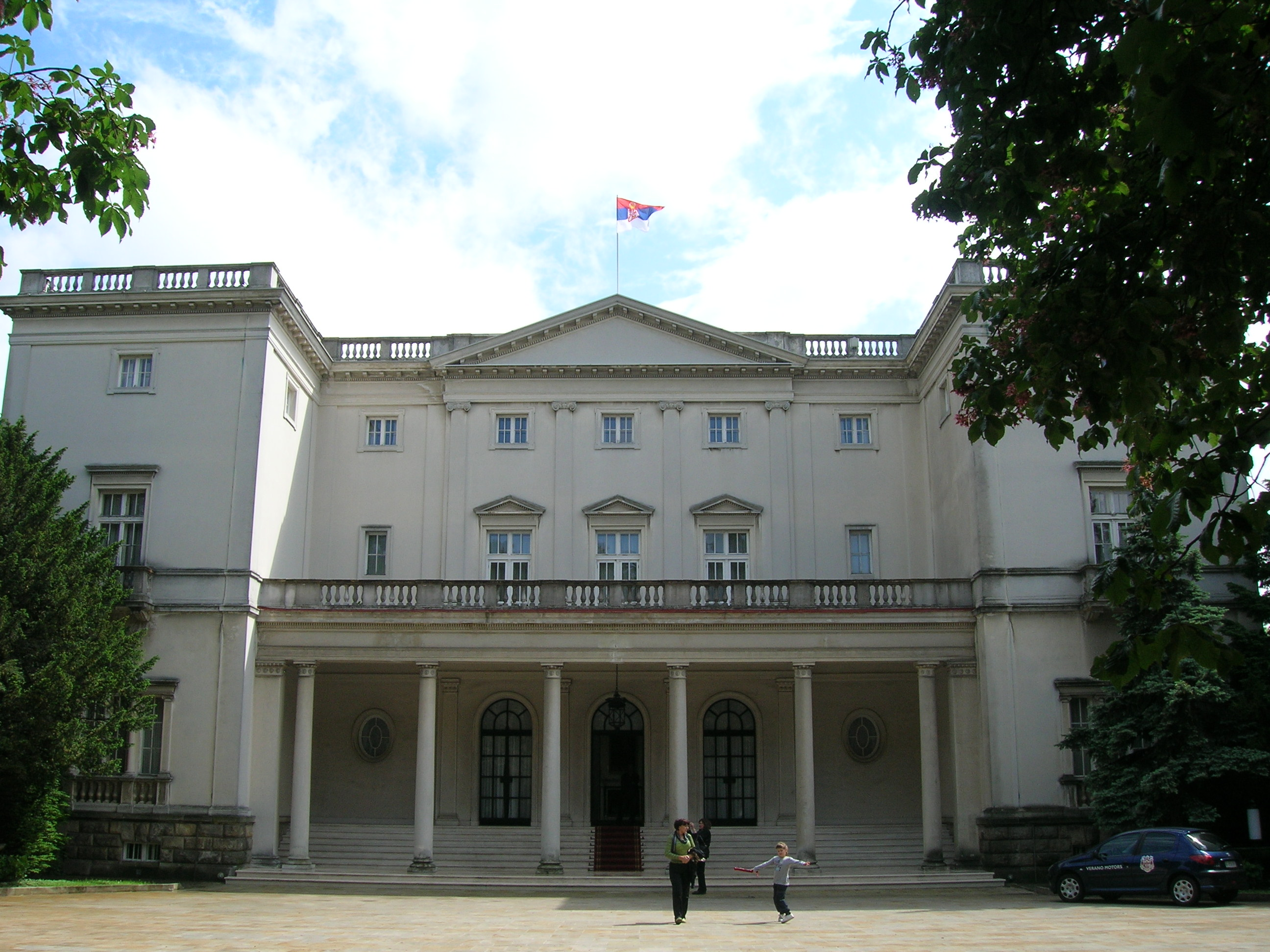
Beli Dvor

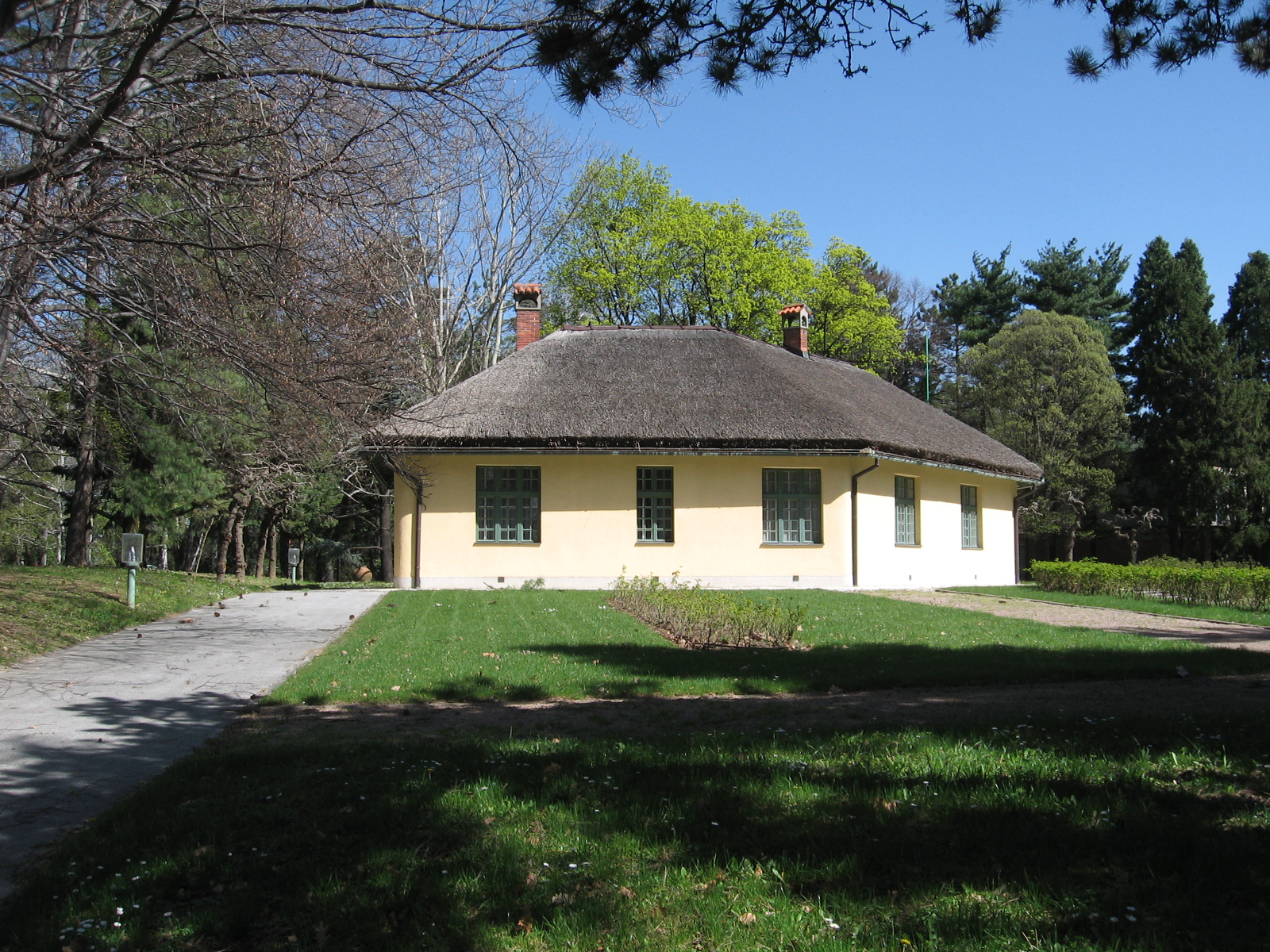
Thatched House

The Kraljevski Dvor (Serbian: Краљевски двор, lit. "Royal Palace") is a grand stucco villa in the Serbo-Byzantine Revival style by architects Živojin Nikolić and Russian architects Nikolay Krasnov. It was built from 1924 to 1929 with the private funds of King Alexander I and was the official residence of the Karađorđević royal family from 1934 to 1941. It is today home to a pretender to the Serbian throne, Crown Prince Alexander, where he lives since his return to the country from exile in 2001.

Adjacent to the residence is the Royal Chapel, dedicated to Saint Andrew, the patron saint of royal House of Karađorđević. The Chapel was built at the same time as Kraljevski Dvor and is attached to it through a colonnade with semicircular arches.

== Beli Dvor ==
Beli Dvor (Serbian: Бели двор, lit. "White Palace") was built from 1934 to 1937 with the private funds of King Alexander I and was the residence of Prince Regent Paul from 1934 to 1941. Following the World War II, the new communist government seized the assets and property of the Karađorđević royal family. The palace was used by Yugoslav president, Josip Broz Tito, and later by the president of FR Yugoslavia, Slobodan Milošević, for official state functions and receptions of visiting foreign dignitaries.

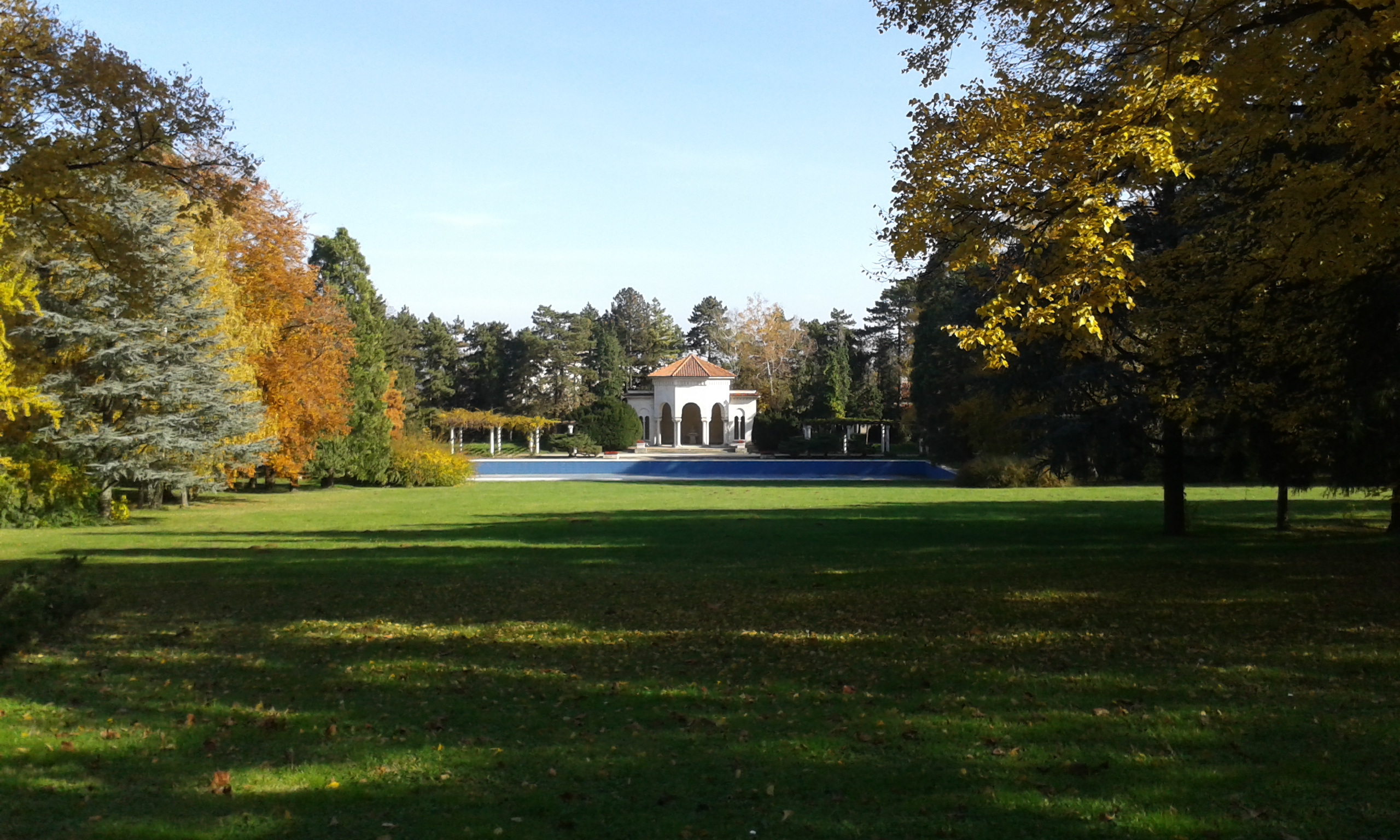
Garden

== Thatched House ==
The Thatched House (Serbian: Слaмната кућа, romanized: Slamnata kuća) is a structure built in the style of old traditional Serbian houses. King Alexander I used to reside in this house supervising the construction works at the compound, and it also served as the studying room for his three sons as well as the art studio of Queen Maria.

== Parks and gardens ==
The compound is covered with parks of the English garden type, where the vegetation is allowed to grow naturally, whereas around the two palaces the French garden concept of park arrangement is applied, meaning that flowers, bushes and trees have neatly shaped forms and are planted in strictly geometrical order.

== See also ==
- List of Serbian royal residences
- List of official residences of Serbia
