= Villa Zlatni Breg =

Former royal palace in Smederevo, Serbia

- Вила Златни брег
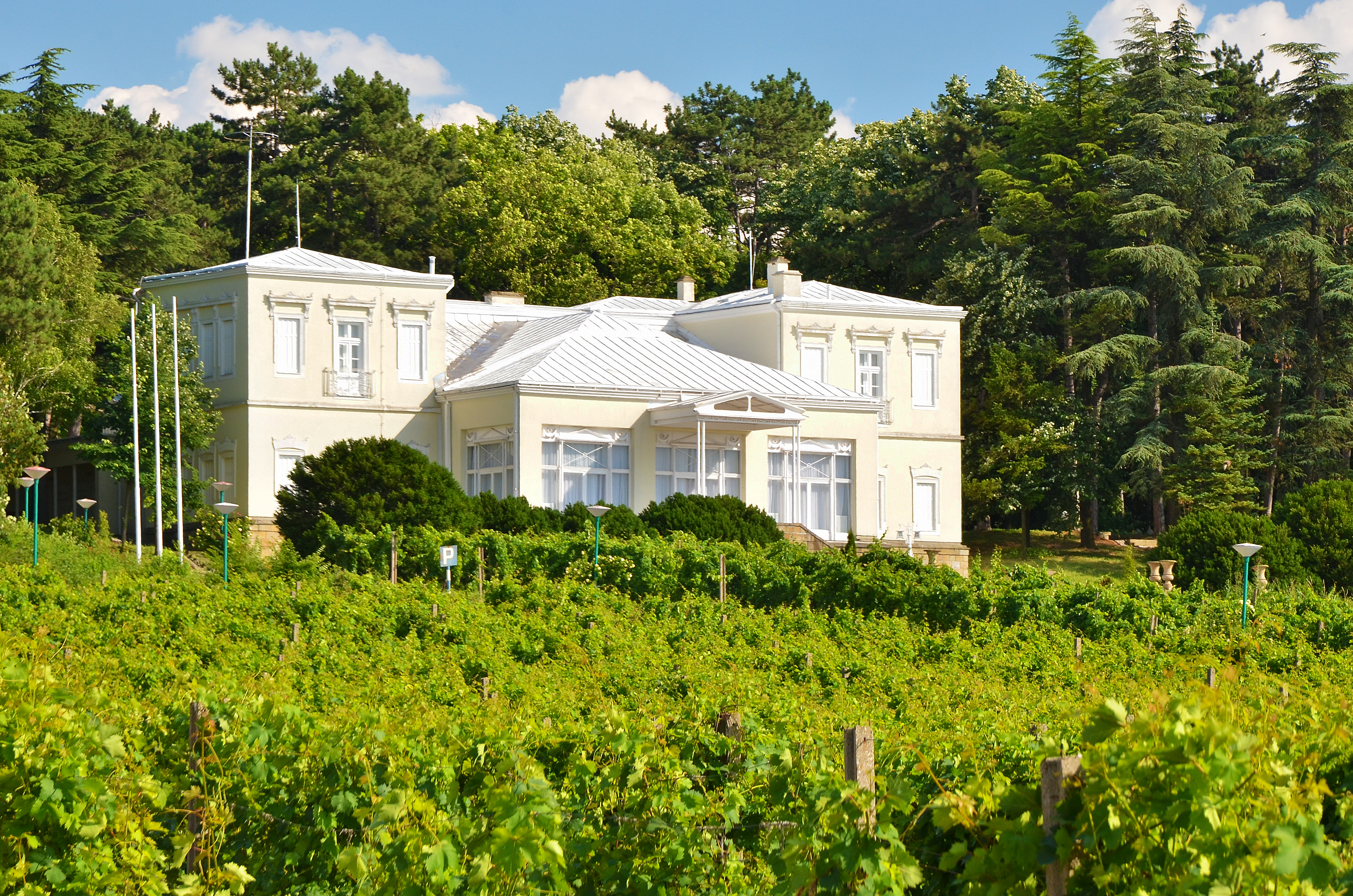
- Interactive map of the Villa Zlatni Breg area
- Alternative names: Obrenović Summerhouse; Летњиковац Обреновића

General information
- Type: Representation house Cultural monument
- Location: Smederevo, Serbia
- Coordinates: 44°39′12″N 20°53′31″E
- Inaugurated: 1865

Design and construction
- Architects: Jovan Ilkić (1897 upgrade); Bogdan Bogdanović (1961 refurbishment)

Website
- The Obrenović Villa in Plavinac by Smederevo

The Villa Zlatni Breg (Serbian: Вила Златни брег; lit. 'Golden Hill Villa'), also known as the Obrenović Summerhouse (Serbian: Летњиковац Обреновића, romanized: Letnjikovac Obrenovića), in Smederevo, Serbia, is state representation house, owned and managed by the Serbian state. It was a private residence and summer retreat of the royal House of Obrenović from 1865 to 1903. The earliest structure originates from 1865 but was expanded and reconstructed several times since then. As it is owned by the state, it has been used for the state receptions and since 2015 is open for public.

== Location ==
The villa is situated on the northern slopes of the Plavinac Hill, overseeing the Danube from its right bank, and the Banat lowlands across the river. It is situated above the Old Smederevo road, which connected the capital Belgrade with Smederevo, a starting section of the historical Tsarigrad Road.

The villa is located on the eastern outskirts of Smederevo, above which is the hill of Zlatno Brdo ("Golden Hill") which gave the name to the building.

== History ==
=== Obrenović Summerhouse ===
==== Prince Miloš ====
From 1827 to 1829, Prince Miloš Obrenović purchased the 37 hectares (91 acres) lot from a local Ottoman sipahi. The lots already had a planted vineyard, orchard, meadows, a house and steam bath. In 1831 the prince planted his own vineyards on the estate as the entire Smederevo area is well known for its grapes. The first object built was a wine cellar for the wine produced by the prince's vineyards which Miloš exported into Europe. The cellar and the neighboring konak, with one room and a kitchen, were built in 1833. In 1836 Prince Miloš sent 500 seedlings of the best Smederevo varieties of grapes to be planted around the objects as a garden. Captain Jovanča Spasić was appointed by Prince Miloš to take care of the estate. In this period, the estate had an economic, wine producing function, rather than a leisure one. The vineyards were in operation even during the 1842-58 period, when house of Obrenović was dethroned and exiled.

==== Prince Mihailo ====
The original house was built in 1865, on the orders of Prince Mihailo, Miloš' son and heir. He planned it as the summerhouse for him and his wife, Princess Julia. It was a simple, one floor edifice built in the Swiss style, but the Serbian press referred to it as "palace". The summerhouse was nicknamed salon. Additionally, Prince Mihailo planted 2,000 vines of the French varieties and, as an avid equestrian, arranged the horse tracks around the house. The name of the architect is unknown, but he was probably from Vienna as the house was built in the Mitteleuropean architectural style.

The central part of the front façade is flanked by the entrance with the vestibule and double stairs. The entire house is set on the high stone foundation with a cellar which was entered from the front, between two forks of the staircase. The vestibule is an entryway into the salon's lobby which was glassed in with windows. The sides and the front were glassed with 4 large French windows. Wooden, gable-shaped decorative elements above the vestibule are in the Swiss style. The windows of the ground level were decorated in the Classicistic style. Three windows on the northern side are framed with chambranles. The lintels above the ground floor windows had decorative plastics which resembles the open crown - above each window there was an arch made from the face bricks with small decorative volutes in the corners and one large with an acorn in the central part.

In 1865 Prince Mihailo ordered for the materials used for the construction of his summerhouse to be transferred to Belgrade, so that First Town Hospital can be built. It is not clear whether this was concerning the leftovers of the materials remaining after the construction was finished, or that he planned to build a larger edifice but stopped it at this point.

==== King Milan I and Queen Natalie ====
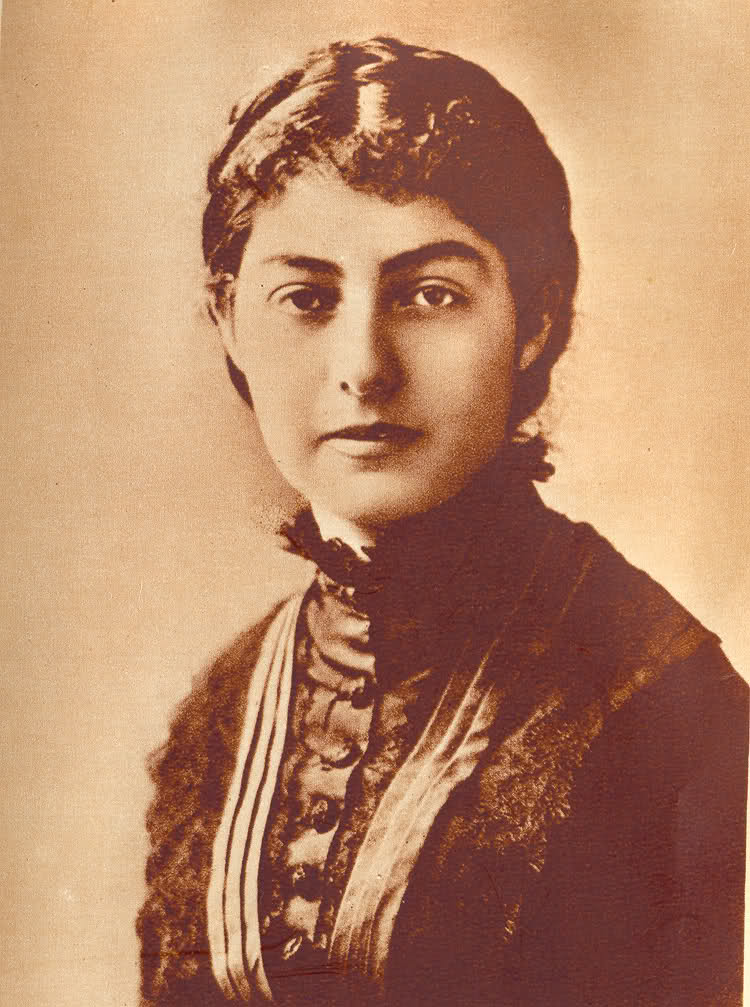
Queen Natalie, who insisted on adapting the venue into the summer court and ordered the 1897 expansion

The park which was formed around the summerhouse by 1878, was the first park in Smederevo. When Queen Natalie wanted to entertain a large number of guests in 1882, it had to be rescheduled as the building turned out to be "cracked a lot and prone to collapse". Apparently it hasn't been maintained well, but the vineyards were superbly cared for.

During the reign of King Milan I and Queen Natalie, the royal social life was established in the villa, apparently on queen's insistence. Milan introduced the wealth and servants, and the very first courts for tennis and cricket in Serbia were built next to the villa. Queen ordered the creation of the walking paths through the park and the forest on the hill above the villa. The declaration of Serbia into the kingdom in 1882 was announced here. It served as a venue for the royal parties and gatherings of the cultural and artistic elite. Among the visitors in this and later periods were poets and writers Milan Rakić, Laza Kostić, Branislav Nušić, Stevan Sremac, Simo Matavulj and Milovan Glišić, and painter Paja Jovanović. The writing desk where Rakić wrote his poems, his bed and library are still in the house. The royal couple spent so much time in the villa that it appeared as if the court moved out of Belgrade.

After king and queen divorced in 1888, the summerhouse was left aside for a while and was again in the bad shape. Natalie was banished from Serbia so Milan I, who abdicated in the meantime, remained the owner of the estate but transferred it to his only child, still minor King Alexander I. In 1895, king Alexander I invited his mother back to Serbia and she began organizing parties in the venue again. Now a queen mother, Natalie hired architect Jovan Ilkić in 1897 to upgrade and expand the building into the proper royal summer residence, which she intended to turn into the summer court for her son. Ilkić added two side avant-corps and decorated the edifice with ornaments in the style of the Swiss villas. The Queen Natalie was personally involved in the adaptation, style, setting, park arrangements and interiors, to the most minute detail. Austrian traveler Felix Philipp Kanitz, who visited the venue and described it as a "Swiss villa", depicted Natalie as a "tall lady, which had both the love of and the sense for comfortable". Later in 1897, opposing his son's relationship with her widowed lady in waiting Draga Mašin, Natalie left Serbia for good.

==== King Alexander I and Queen Draga ====
King Alexander I and Queen Draga often spent time in Plavinac, even more than the previous royal couple. As they grew more and more unpopular, this was a way to hide their private lives and the remove themselves from the capital city. As they mostly came via the Danube, the town of Smederevo decided to expand the port and the build a promenade and a park along the bank. During their stay in the house, parties, balls and feast were held almost every day. They began their relationship in the villa in 1895, as Draga used to be Queen Natalie's lady in waiting. They spent their honeymoon here and organized celebration of their first anniversary with a reception for 400 guests. From here Queen Draga dispatched a false news about her pregnancy and here she secluded herself when the scandal broke out. The villa also continued to be used for public and state affairs so some of the constitutions were declared here and it was often a meeting place of the government ministers. Historians cite the house as one of the locations where the 1903 overthrow of the royal couple was planned.

During this time, the villa had the most vibrant life. King often used villa for his official businesses - holding ministerial sessions, signing appointments and royal decrees, and, in time, receiving foreign envoys. Delegation from the Ottoman Sultan Abdul Hamid II was the first recorded diplomatic visit to the villa. Other diplomats included Russian envoy Nikolai Charykov, German envoy Ludwig von Wäcker-Gotter, Ottoman general Hamdi Pasha and head of the Russian secret police, Alexander Iosipovich Grabo.

=== Orešković family ===
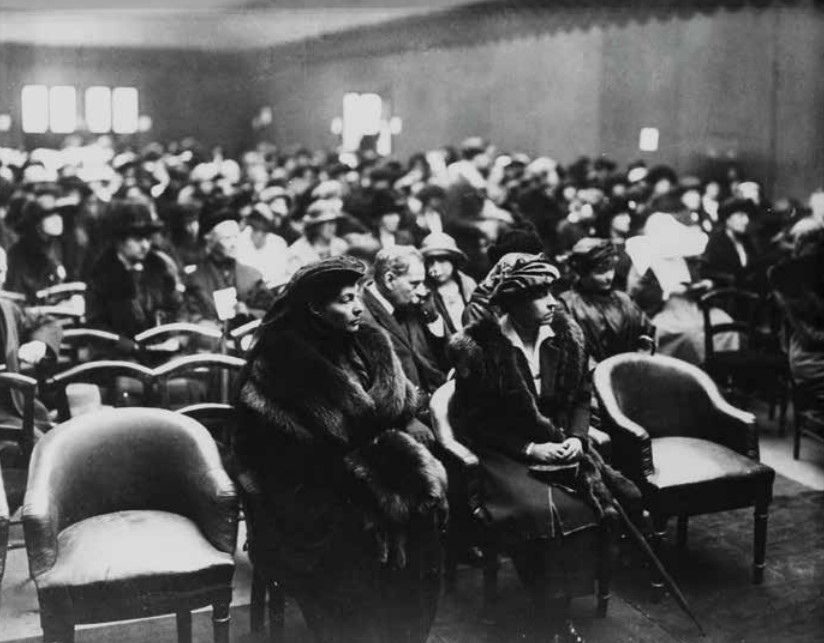
Antonije's daughter, Ružica Orešković, as lady in waiting with Queen Natalie in Paris, France

After the 1903 May Coup, Queen Natalie bequeathed the villa to her loyal friend, Colonel Antonije Orešković, who, during the turmoil of her divorce from King Milan—a scandal fueled by his infidelity that unsettled the nation at the close of the 19th century—had stood firmly at her side.

Both of Antonije's daughters, Ružica "Ruža" Orešković (1875-1959) and Milica "Mica" Cakić née Orešković (1876-1907), served as ladies in waiting to Queen Natalie, and followed her into an exile. After inheriting the villa, his sons, Borivoje and Milan significantly advanced the wine production. In 1909 they installed the hail cannons, among the first in Serbia.

During World War I the house was heavily damaged in the 1914 Battle of Smederevo fought between the Serbian Army and invading Austro-Hungarian Army. It was later further damaged in the frequent German bombardments in 1915. After the occupation, it was adapted into the military infirmary. The building was almost completely looted by 1918 when the country was liberated. It was described that only "empty rooms and 100 years old linden trees" remained. The Orešković family kept the villa open for visitors.

During World War II, Germans set their local command in the building. They took with them some of the furniture and valuable artifacts.

=== Socialist period ===
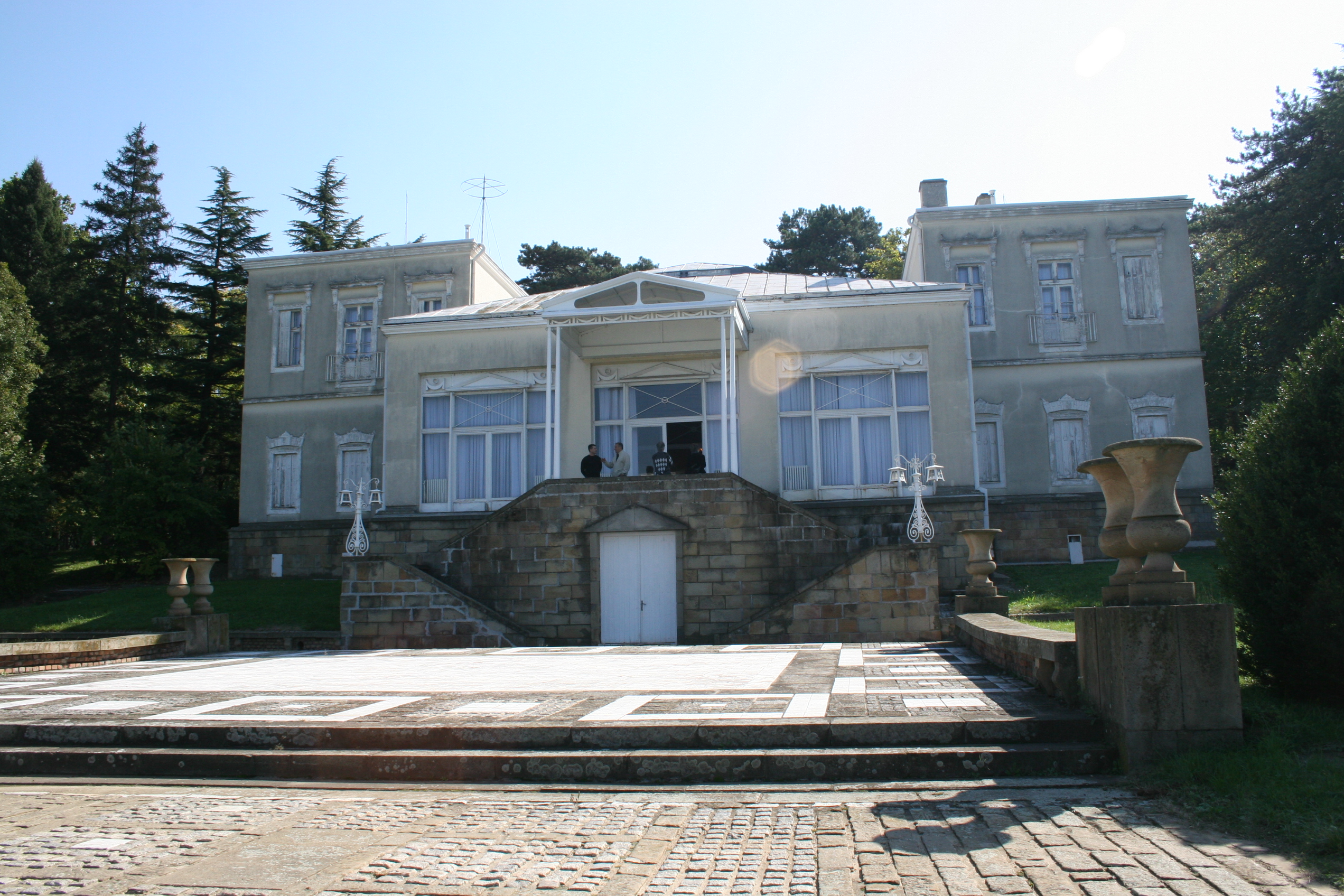
Main entrance stairwell

After the World War II, villa became the state property as it was confiscated from the Orešković family. It was at first used by the Ministry of Internal Affairs, before becoming a representative object for the state protocol. President of Yugoslavia Josip Broz Tito visited the venue for the first time in 1953. Tito preferred to visit via Danube, on his yacht "Krajina". Tito often spent time in the villa with his foreign guests, starting with Ahmed Sukarno in 1956. By this time, the venue was already renamed to "Zlatni Breg".

By the late 1950s there were concerns regarding the bad shape of the object and threat of the mass wasting as it is located on the terrain prone to it. The first idea was to tear the object completely down and build a new, firmer one. This idea was abandoned and instead architect Bogdan Bogdanović and painters Predrag Milosavljević and Miodrag B. Protić were to inspect the building. They reported that the condition of the object is shameful, describing cracked walls, sagging roofs, parapets made of reeds, etc. They also said that there is not one old, valuable item in the house and suggested that the venue should be restored and "brought to its epoch".

The pre-adaptation works were done by architect Milan Antić. Reconstruction in earnest began in 1957, headed by Bogdanović. He completely reshaped the object, giving it the overall Classicistic look it has today. All wooden decoration was removed. The ground floor was enhanced with the locally quarried brown stones while the plateau in front of the entrance was paved with the granite slabs. Small but monumental entry with the gable was especially made prominent. Above every ground flood window a metallic ornament was placed which completely separated the visual of the front façade and the side wings as the lintels of the side windows remained intact. The floor of the great salon was paved with black and white marble in the chessboard pattern while the fireplace and the mirror frame were made from the white Venčac marble. The interior was arranged by Milosavljević and Protić. The furniture and artifacts for the interior of the villa were purchased on auctions all over Europe or were bought off from the old Belgrade families (Rajačić, Drobnjak, Kumanudi, Rakić). In front of the entrance, the fountain was placed with the bronze sculpture Leda and the Swan, work of painter Olja Ivanjicki. The park was also rearranged while the rose garden was planted behind the building. It was finished in 1961, for the First Summit of the Non-Aligned countries which was held in Belgrade, as planned. Protić later wrote: "In two years, the fashionable Obrenović summer residence was created".

In 1964 an annex, which serves as a kitchen, was added to the back side of the building. It is a ground floor object with 5 French windows with wooden lids on each longer wall and with a square, polygonal spike-like pyramid on top. The renovation of the building's foundation and of the façade was done in 1982. In 1996/97 the furniture was restored.

Tito and the first lady Jovanka Broz stayed in the villa in 1970 with the leadership of the Serbian branch of the Communist party (Dragoslav Marković, Marko Nikezić, Latinka Perović), on the occasion of Tito being declared an honorary citizen of Smederevo. Tito and Jovanka stayed in the villa for the last time in 1977. Other high state officials who often visited the villa were Stane Dolanc and Dragoslav Marković. In the 1990s, during the period of Slobodan Milošević's rule, he never came to the villa but it was frequently visited by some high-ranking officials. It became a gathering place of the secret police which held meetings there headed by Jovica Stanišić.

=== Contemporary period ===
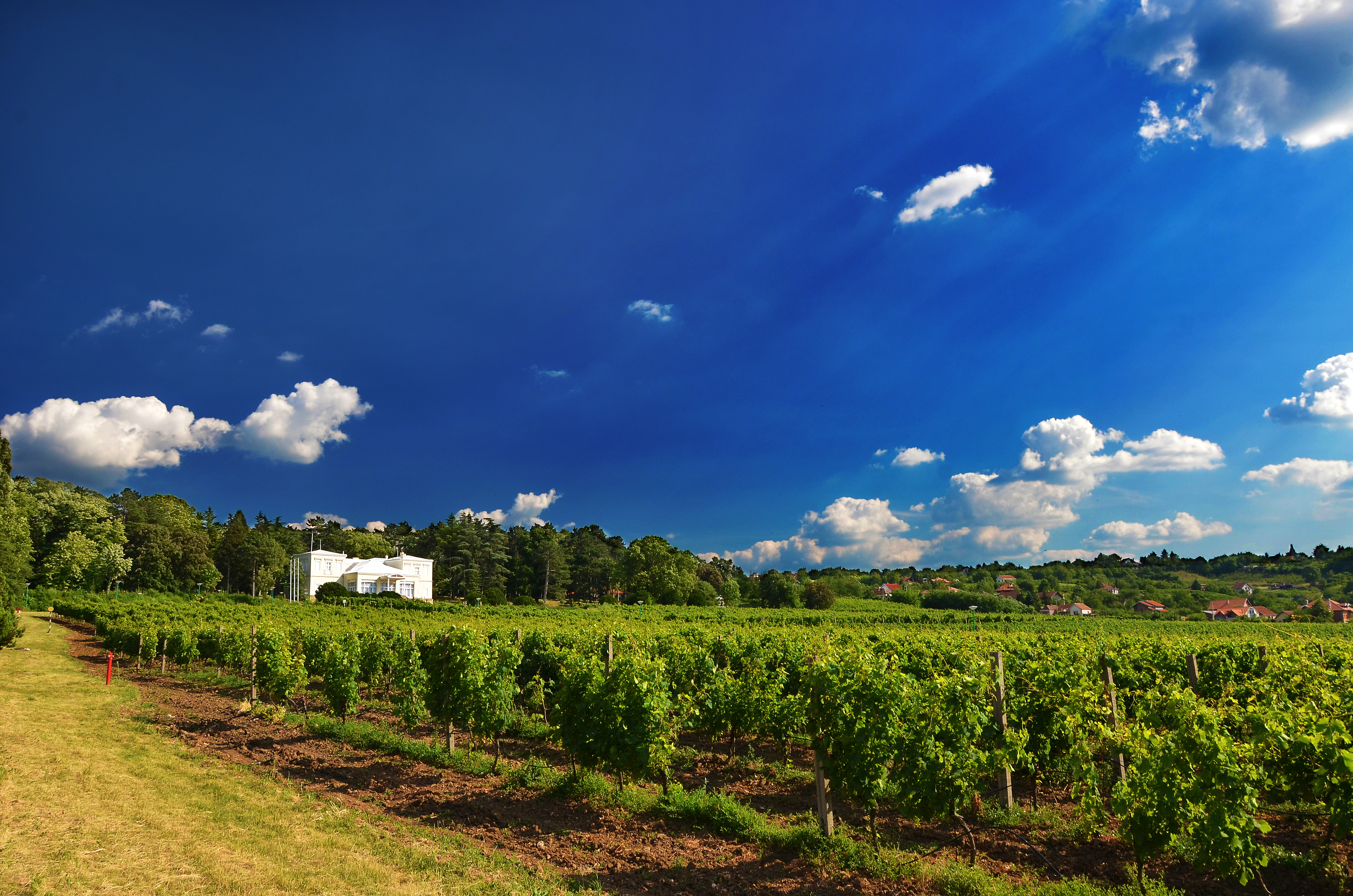
The villa and the vineyards

During the 2000s the venue was used as a scenery for following movies and series: The End of Obrenović Dynasty (1995), The Robbery of the Third Reich (2004), On the Harmful Effects of Tobacco (2004), The Fourth Man (2007), The Last Audience (2008).

In 2009 the villa was declared a cultural monument, even though the process started back in 1997. It is the only surviving summerhouse of the Obrenović dynasty.

Though constantly used in official capacity, it was in 2011 that President of Serbia Boris Tadić publicly showed the use of the villa as an official state representation house, when he organized a meeting there with the prime ministers of Croatia and Slovenia, Jadranka Kosor and Borut Pahor, respectively. His successors, Tomislav Nikolić and Aleksandar Vučić, continued occasionally to use the venue for official purposes. A meeting of 20 ambassadors with Vučić was held in 2015, while both the Chinese president Xi Jinping and Slovenian prime minister Miro Cerar had official bunket in the villa in 2016.

The villa was forbidden for the civilians for decades so it was nicknamed the "forbidden city" by the inhabitants of Smederevo. On 16 May 2015, during the Long Night of Museums, it was open for public for the first time. Since 2016 it has been open for organized visits with guides, from May to October.

In 2016-17 the main entry stairwell was reconstructed and the new façade was done on the entire object. Today, the entire complex - park, vineyards, villa - is officially declared a "representative house for the use of state authorities" and is described by the reporters as "one of the most representative owned by the state". It is surrounded by 30 ha (74 acres) of parks and vineyards.

== Interior ==
The villa includes the summer salon, winter salon, green salon, dining room, library and royal dorm. The arrangement of the interior includes:

Ground floor

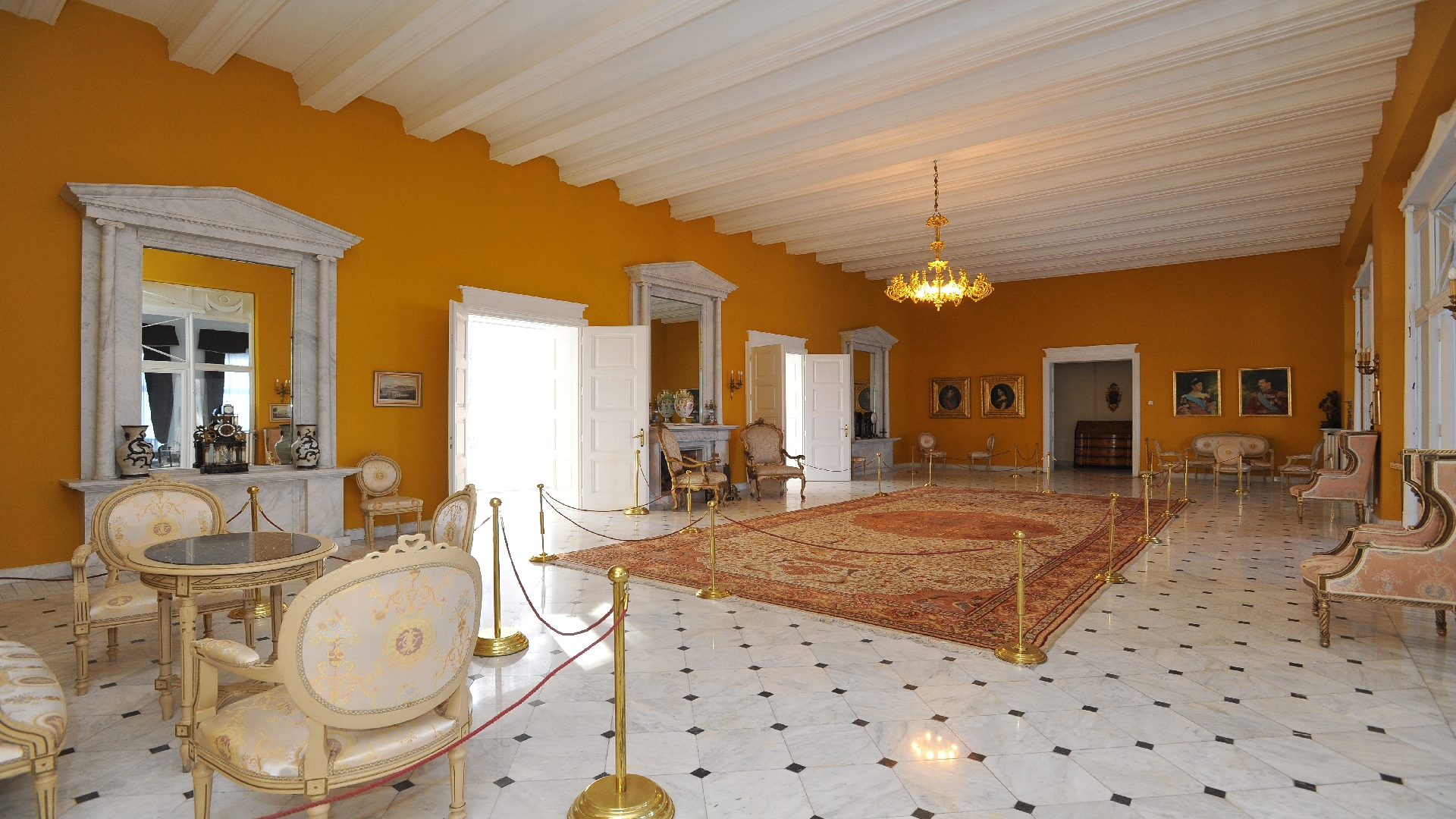
Winter Salon

- Summer Salon, actually, a glassed veranda; 1860 card table in the Napoleon III style; 1840s small chess table in the late Biedermeier style; late 19th century Neoclassicistic style étagère-music stand; 1815-20 Empire style table clock; mid-19th century late Biedermeier style musical commode - automatophone; a small table for handwork; two small tables from the second quarter of the 18th century in the Rococo style.
- Winter (or Great) Salon; reproductions of the Obrenović dynasty family portraits: Prince Michael (by Johann Böss), Prince Miloš (by Moritz Michael Daffinger), King Milan and Queen Natalie (by Stevan Todorović) and King Alexander and Queen Draga (by Vlaho Bukovac); two salon type settees in the Louis XVI style from c.1780; two lukijernas (oil lamps) from the second half of the 19th century; fireplace with accessories (a holder for the tongs and the poker, a front for the fireplace, bellows or alarije), all from the late 19th century; gold plated porcelain amphora from the 20th century.
- Library; reproduction of the Prince Miloš' portrait with the fez (by Pavel Đurković); 1815 combined wardrobe made in Vienna, in the early Biedermeier style - a rare and precious exhibit, a craftsmanship's masterpiece; two carpets, originating from the late 19th century, from the Asia Minor and Middle East.
- Dining Room; an original portrait of Queen Natalie, by Stevan Todorović; a dining table in the Louis XVI style; 1840-45 cabinet and sideboard in the Neo-Rococo style; a chandelier from the same period.

First floor

Left section is organized as a royal suite, which consists of the Study Room, Salon, lobby and a dorm. Right section is adapted into the apartments.

- Study Room; reproduction of Paja Jovanović's painting The Takovo Uprising, commissioned by King Alexander in 1898; writing desk, made of sycamore maple, from the late 19th century; floor clock; library; tabernacle; highly valuable cabinet from the early 17th century; carpet from the Central Asia from the 19th century; Persian rug, made from 500.000 knots of camel hair, woven in the 1710s.
- Empire Salon; wall photos made by Anastas Jovanović; oleograph of Princess (later Queen) Natalie in folk costume; Baroque mirror; Venetian chandelier made from the Murano glass.
- Dorm; dressing table (coiffeuse); early 19th century Empire style bed; two smaller Persian rugs; three icons - Coronation of the Virgin (c.1780), Resurrection with the holidays of Jesus and Virgin Mary, and Saint Nicholas (mid 19th century).
- Apartment 2; early 19th century Empire style bed; 1820 Biedermeier wardrobe; Neo-Baroque dressing table with the rock crystal mirror.
- Apartment 3; 1785-90 English Classicistic style cabinet room (writing-secretary desk, chair, library); c.1820 Biedermeier style sitting furniture set.

== See also ==
- List of Serbian royal residences
- List of official residences of Serbia
