= Stari dvor =

Palace in Belgrade, Serbia

Stari Dvor
- Стари двор
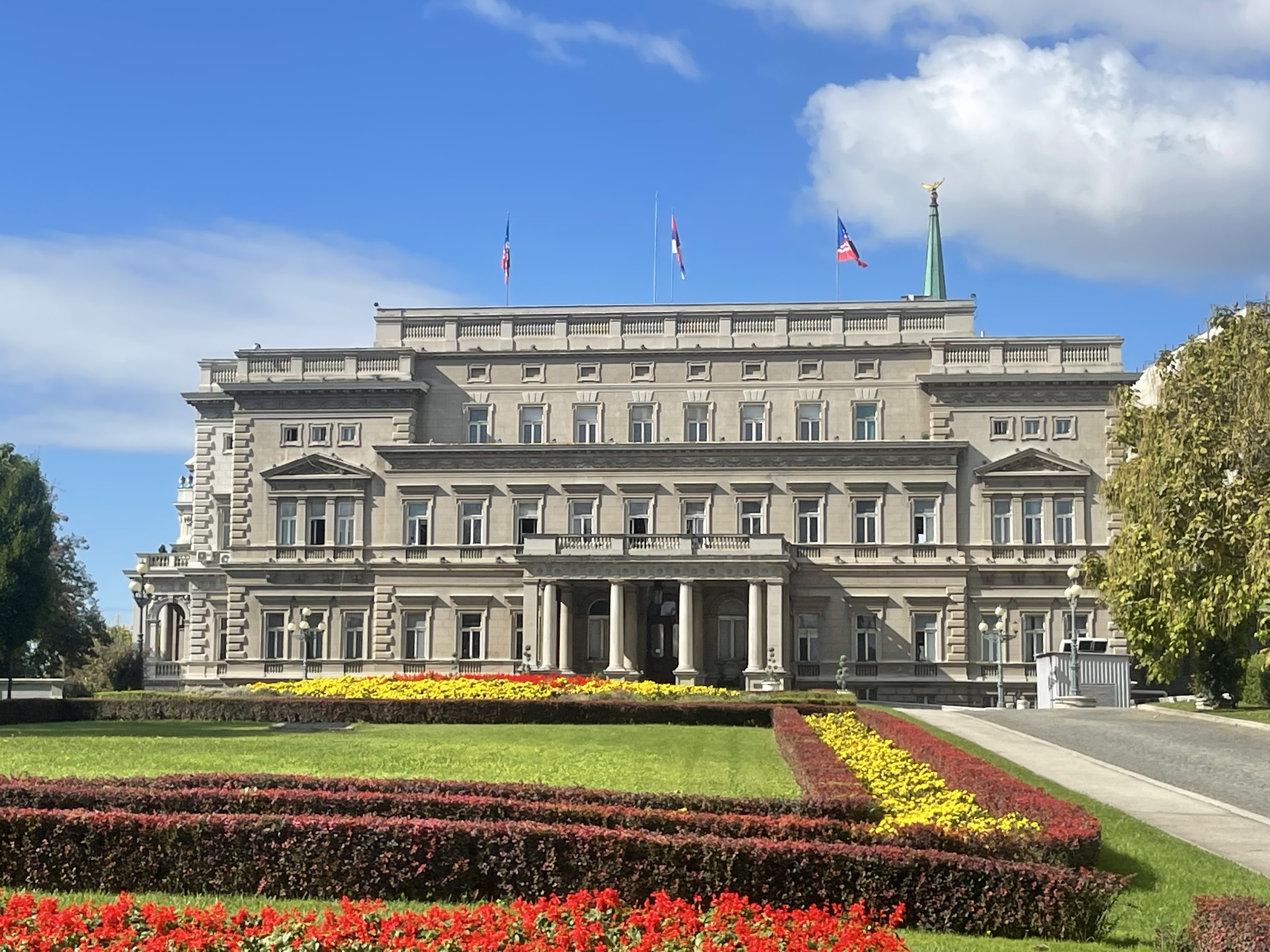
- Front view and main entrance

- Location within Belgrade

General information
- Location: Belgrade, Serbia
- Coordinates: 44°48′39″N 20°27′45″E
- Construction started: 1882
- Completed: 1884

Design and construction
- Architects: Aleksandar Bugarski; Jovan Ilkić

Stari Dvor (Serbian Cyrillic: Стари двор, lit. 'Old Palace') is the city hall of Belgrade, Serbia, housing the office of the mayor of Belgrade. It was the royal residence of Serbian royal family (the Obrenović and later Karađorđević) from 1884 to 1922.

The palace is located on the corner of Kralja Milana and Dragoslava Jovanovića streets, opposite Novi Dvor (seat of the president of Serbia).

== History ==
=== Development of the compound ===
Influential politician and a businessman, Stojan Simić, purchased in 1830 the lot where palace was to be built. Simić drained the marsh, filled and leveled the terrain and on the northern side of the modern Kralja Milana street constructed a house in 1842. The edifice became known as the Stari Konak.

Development of the first Serbian royal compound began in 1843, when the ruling prince Alexander Karađorđević purchased the konak with the surrounding garden.

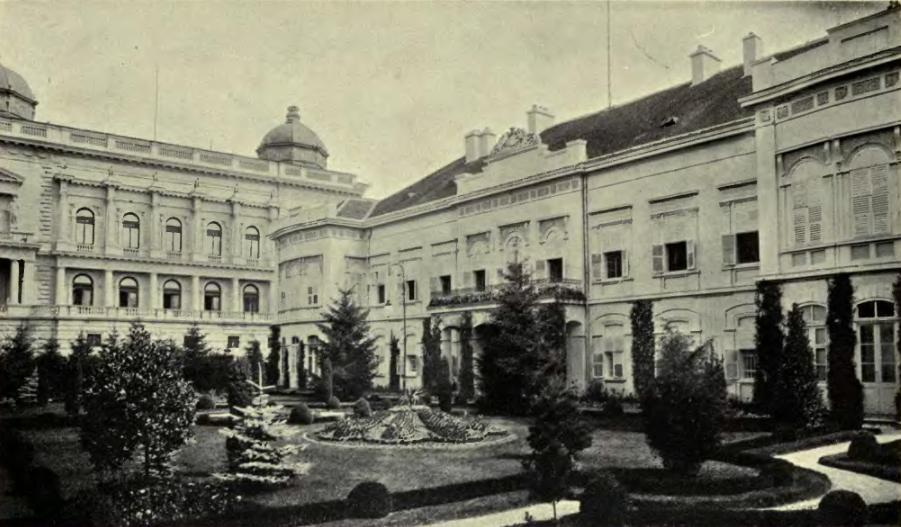
Stari Konak (front), Stari Dvor (back)

In the 1850s, additional building was constructed next to Stari Konak, to the north, and colloquially called Mali Dvor or Mali Konak ("Little Palace" or "Little Konak"). When the House of Obrenović was restored in 1858, they moved in the residence there. As an heir apparent, the Prince Mihailo used Mali Dvor. The palaces (Stari Konak and Mali Konak) were surrounded by the auxiliary buildings, servants' quarters, horse stables, etc. Ruling prince Miloš Obrenović, Michael's father, decided in 1858 to build a new palace, which was built next to the palace's garden, to the south on the location of modern-day Novi Dvor, and which became known as Dvor sa kulama ("Palace with Towers"). Upon ascending to the throne in 1860, Prince Michael decided to use the Stari Konak, while part of the state administration (ministries of foreign and internal affairs) was located in Palace with the Towers.

=== Construction ===
Instigated by the King Milan I, Stari Dvor was built between 1882 and 1884, according to the design of Aleksandar Bugarski, in the style of academism of the 19th century, with intention to surpass all previous residences of the Serbian monarchs. In order to build the new palace, the Mali konak had to be demolished first. Jointly with the new palace, Maršalat (the "Marshall's building") was built behind it. The Stari Konak, in which King Alexander I and Queen Draga were assassinated during the 1903 May Coup, was demolished in 1904.

English author Herbert Vivien, who visited the palace by the end of the 19th century, described in detail its interior: "At the left side, there is a fine ball room, with walls of lemon-yellow colour, with huge white lusters of Venetian glass, glistening nicely during the state festivities, lit by electric light. After passing the large reception hall, you enter the banquet hall. Everything is glistening in that hall: starting from the floor up to the carved mahogany table. Some sixty guests may be seated around that table. Leather-upholstered chairs are of the colour of autumn leaves. What is most impressive, is the good taste characterizing all objects, both those for use and the adornments. The admiration is even more caused by the beautiful carved ceilings, inherited from the Turkish era and fashion."

=== World Wars and Interbellum ===
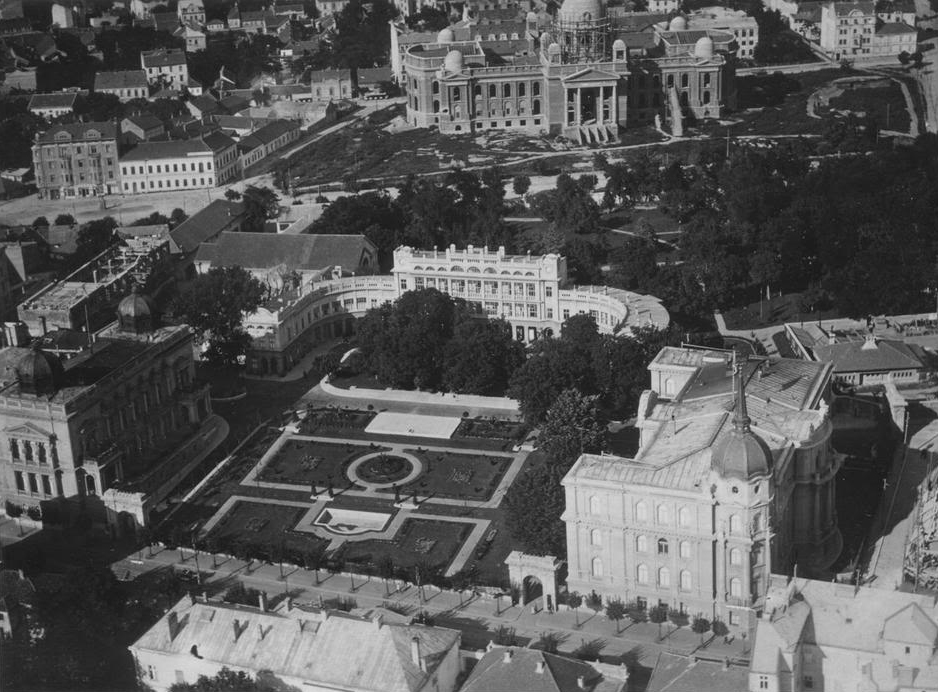
Royal compound in 1930; Stari Dvor (left), Maršalat (middle), Novi Dvor (right)

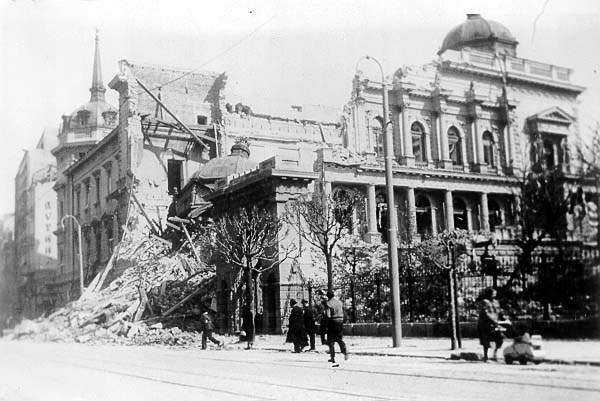
Stari Dvor in 1941 after the German bombing

The palace was damaged in both World Wars. After World War I the palace was reconstructed and upgraded in 1922, being adapted into the large, semicircular building. The first important restoration took place around 1930. The complex, and the royal garden, were entered through monumental, decorative stone arches with gates.

In 1919 and 1920, meetings of the Provisional National Assembly of the newly-formed Kingdom of Serbs, Croats, and Slovenes took place in the palace. Royal festivities and receptions of foreign guests took place there until 1941. It remained the royal residence until 1922 (King Peter I, 1903–21, and King Alexander I of Yugoslavia, 1921–22), when the neighboring Novi Dvor became royal residence in 1922. In order to construct the Novi Dvor, the Palace with the Towers had to be demolished.

In 1922, the Maršalat building was reconstructed on the design of architect Momir Korunović. The original edifice was modest and ground-level and hosted the Royal Guard. Korunović's design of the eastern façade was mostly plain, but the western, facing the court, was richly decorated with ornaments. The Maršalat building, including the royal administration, occupied the central part of the building, while the wings had apartments for royal guests, which partially hastened the construction as it needed to host the guests of the royal wedding between King Alexander I of Yugoslavia and the Princess Maria.

During World War II, the palace was partially demolished on the very first day of the bombing of Belgrade, on 6 April 1941. Soon, the reconstruction of the building began but wasn't finished until October 1944 when Belgrade was liberated as the dome laid in ruins.

=== Communist period ===
The repair and re-arrangement of Stari Dvor lasted until 1947. The auxiliary buildings were demolished in 1946. During that period, the architecture of the palace was significantly changed. The two domes facing the garden and the sculptures of eagles were removed, while the north façade was completely changed. Since that time, the building housed the Presidium of the National Assembly of Serbia. Maršalat was adapted and the Ethnographic Museum moved in until it was relocated to its present-day location in 1952. The building of the Maršalat was demolished in 1957 - most likely as the consequence of the expansion of the Pioneer's Park, former royal gardens.

=== Contemporary period ===
Since 1961, the palace serves as the Belgrade City Hall (housing the office of the Mayor of Belgrade). There were suggestions that monument to King Alexander I Obrenović, erected in 2004 along the boulevard bearing his name, should be relocated to the location of the 1904 demolished Stari Konak, where he was assassinated.

== Architecture ==
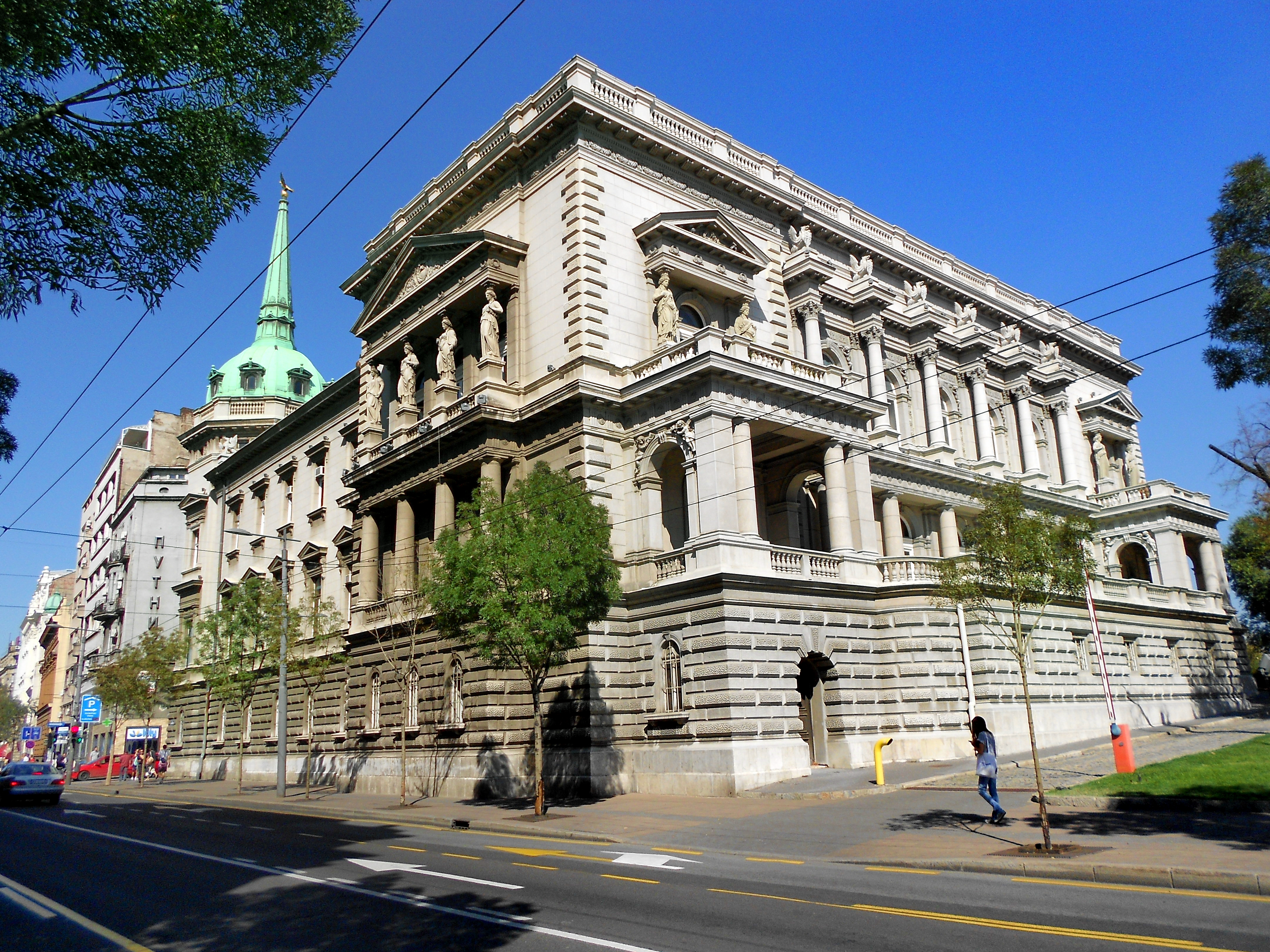
Southern and western facades

The Stari Dvor has almost square foundation of 40x40 m. Its interior design is classical, with central windowed inner hall. There used to be a greenhouse and richly ornamented oaken stairs added later, and leading onto the first floor (they were designed by a famous architect Jovan Ilkić). Those stairs were destroyed in World War I. Around this central space with columns and galleries there were other rooms of the palace, the most important of them being the great hall for receptions and balls and the dining room. As parts of the Palace there were also a nicely arranged library and the palace chapel, which faced the garden. The whole interior equipment of the palace has been mostly imported from Vienna.

By its external architecture the building is one of the most beautiful achievements of academism in Serbia of the 19th century. The facade which faces the garden is most richly made, having projecting balconies which provided closer contact with the garden. The most characteristic motifs of this facade are the caryatids at the first-floor level which, above the balconies at each end of the facade support richly made tympanums of the ending windows. The caryatid are repeated on the facade facing the Kralja Milana street, and the line of Doric columns in beneath them. The Doric columns also appear on the facade against the garden, between richly decorated windows. The other two facades are somewhat simpler. The basement and the corners of the building are rustically designed. The balconies and the attic are balustraded. The three corners of the building used to have proportional domes.

== See also ==
- List of Serbian royal residences
- List of official residences of Serbia
