= List of Serbian royal residences =

This article lists Serbian former royal official and private residences.

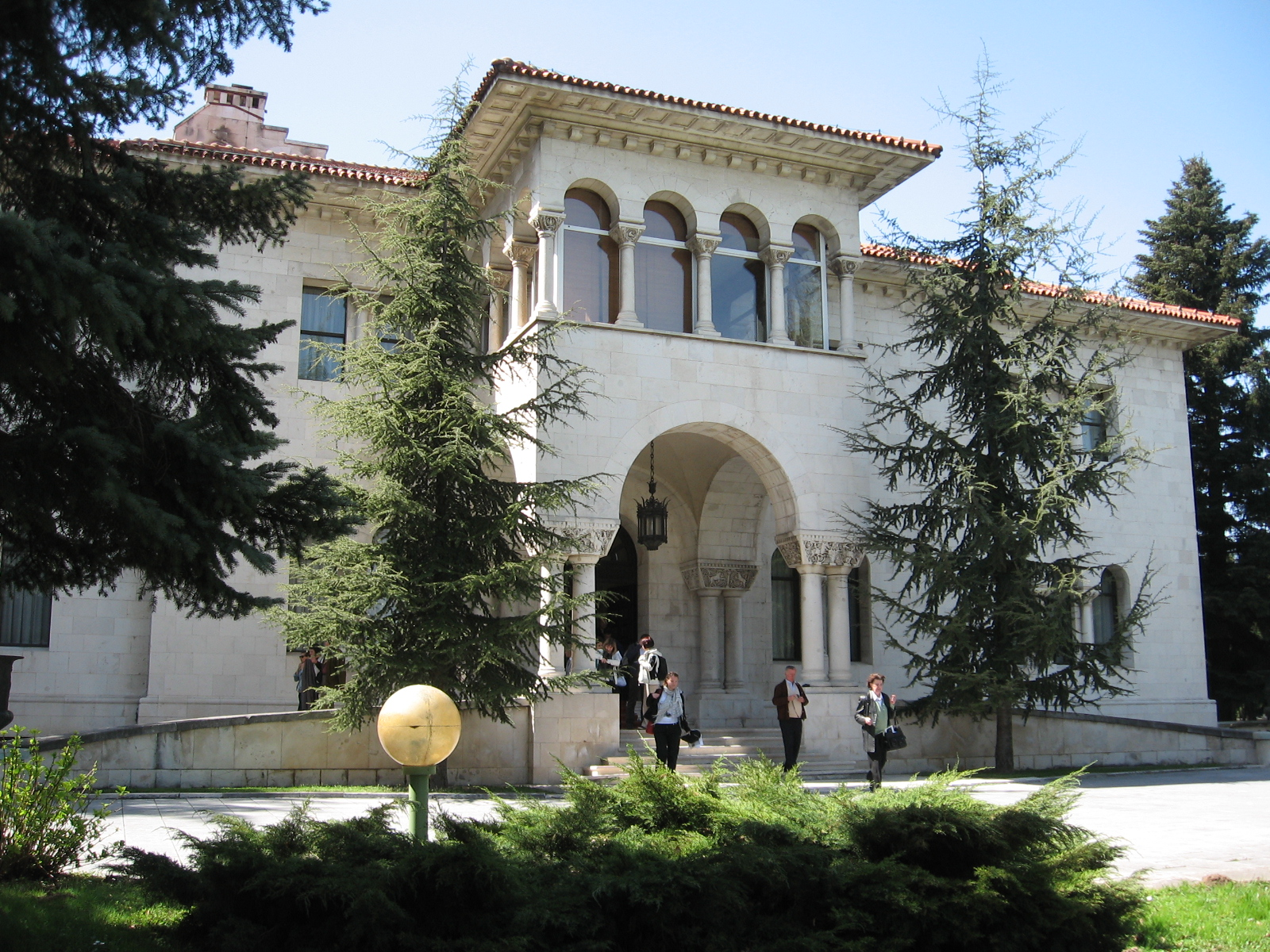
Kraljevski Dvor

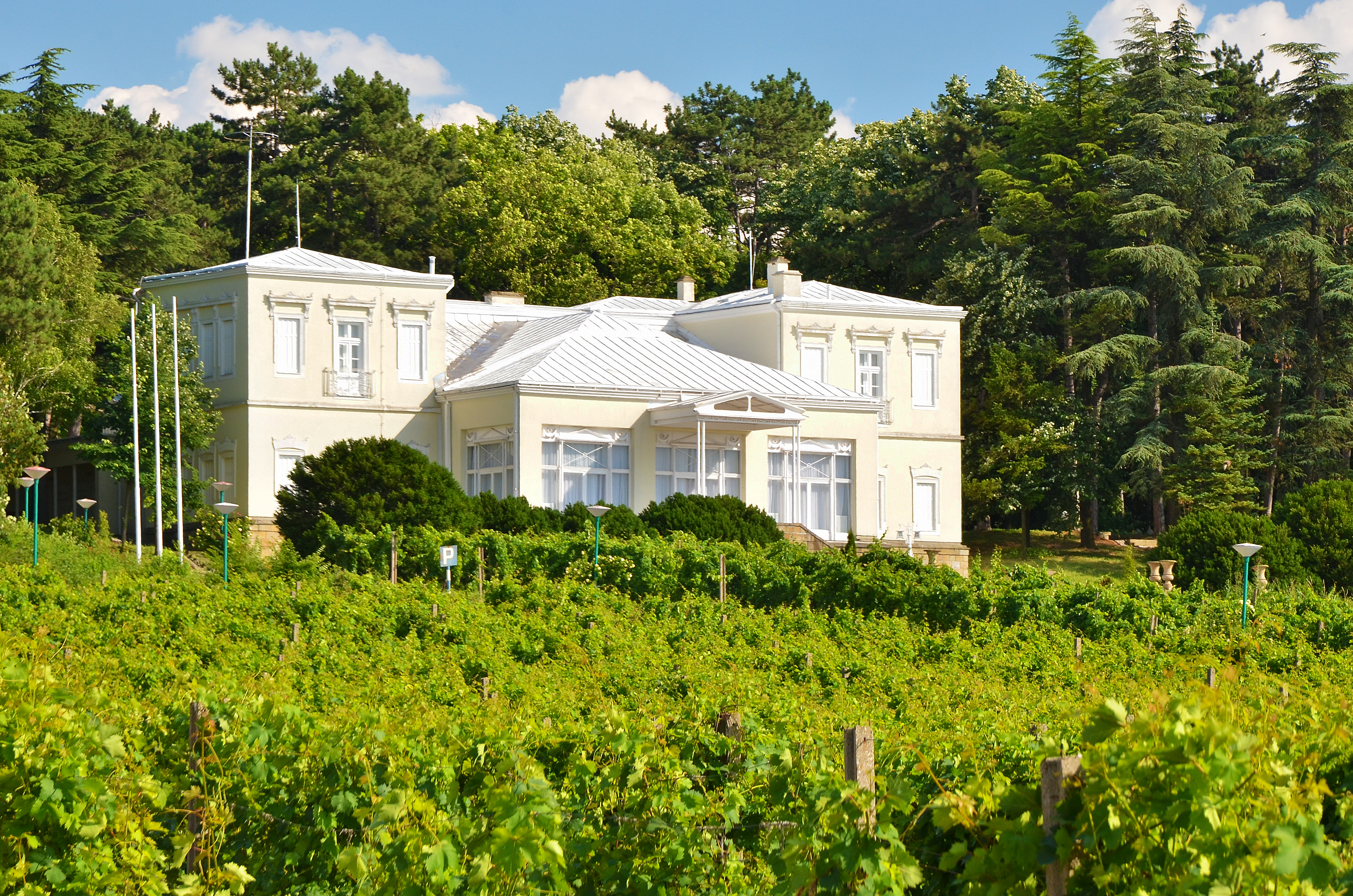
Villa Zlatni Breg

== Official residences ==
- Stari Dvor, Belgrade
- Novi Dvor, Belgrade
- Dedinje Royal Compound, Belgrade
  - Kraljevski Dvor
  - Beli Dvor

== Private residences ==
- Villa Zlatni Breg, Smederevo
- King's Villa, Topola
- Queen's Villa, Topola

== See also ==
- Lists of royal residences
- List of official residences of Serbia
- House of Karađorđević
- House of Obrenović
