= Kraljevski Dvor =

Palace in Belgrade, Serbia

- Краљевски двор
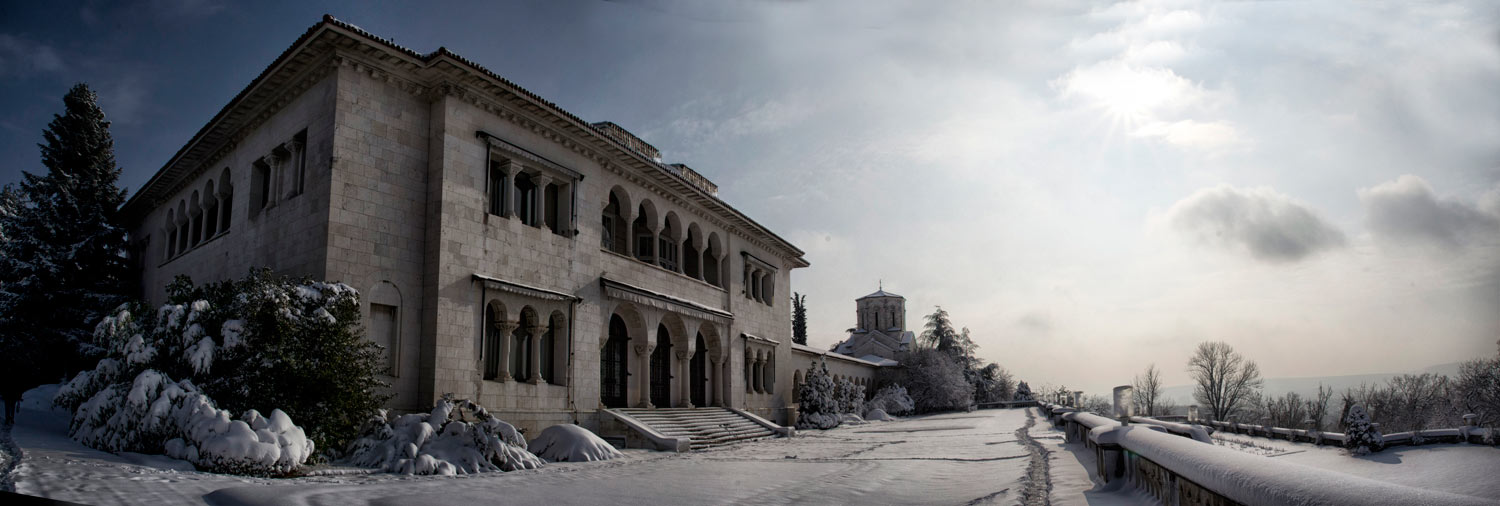
- Kraljevski Dvor and the Royal Chapel
- Interactive map of the Kraljevski Dvor area

General information
- Architectural style: Serbo-Byzantine Revival
- Location: Dedinje, Belgrade, Serbia
- Coordinates: 44°46′13″N 20°26′57″E
- Construction started: 1924
- Completed: 1929

Design and construction
- Architects: Živojin Nikolić; Nikolay Krasnov

The Kraljevski Dvor (Serbian: Краљевски двор, lit. "Royal Palace") is the main building in the Dedinje Royal Compound and was the official residence of the Karađorđević royal family from 1934 to 1941. The palace was built between 1924 and 1929 with the private funds of King Alexander I and since 2001 is home of Crown Prince Alexander.

== Architecture ==
Designed by Živojin Nikolić and Nikolay Krasnov, the palace is an example of Serbo-Byzantine Revival architecture.

On the ground floor there are: the King's Cabinet, the Golden Salon, the Library, the large Dining Room and the Ceremonial Hall, all furnished in the Renaissance style, and the Blue Salon furnished in the Baroque style. In the Golden Salon, whose coffered wooden ceiling is covered with gold leaves, the painting "Holy Family" by Jacopo Palma the Elder is kept, and in the blue salon there is the painting "Venus and Adonis" by Nicolas Poussin.

On the first floor, there are private residence of the royal family.

In the basement there are Oriental rooms whose walls and ceilings are lavishly painted after the model of the castle in the Moscow Kremlin. There is also the Hall Emperor Dušan's Marriage, on the ceiling of which motifs from this folk song are painted, as well as Hall of Whispers, a small salon and a projection hall.

The palace is surrounded with pergolas, park terraces, swimming pools, pavilions and platforms. There are magnificent views from the palace towards the Košutnjak Forest and Avala.

== Royal Chapel ==
The Royal Chapel is devoted to Saint Andrew, the patron saint of house of Karađorđević. The church was built at the same time as Kraljevski Dvor and is attached to it through a colonnade with semicircular arches. It is covered with frescoes painted by Russian painters who travelled around Serbia and copied the frescoes of the most famous Serbian medieval monasteries. The final decoration was chosen personally by King Alexander I with help from the architect Nikolay Krasnov. During the Communist era, the church was repeatedly desecrated, it served as a storage room for cleaners and gardeners. One of the most obvious signs of desecration is a bullet hole in Christ’s forehead and a scratch of the Angel’s wings, representing the communist symbolic "murder of God". The church is today used by the family of the Crown Prince Alexander, especially during Easter, Christmas, and Slava.

== Gallery ==
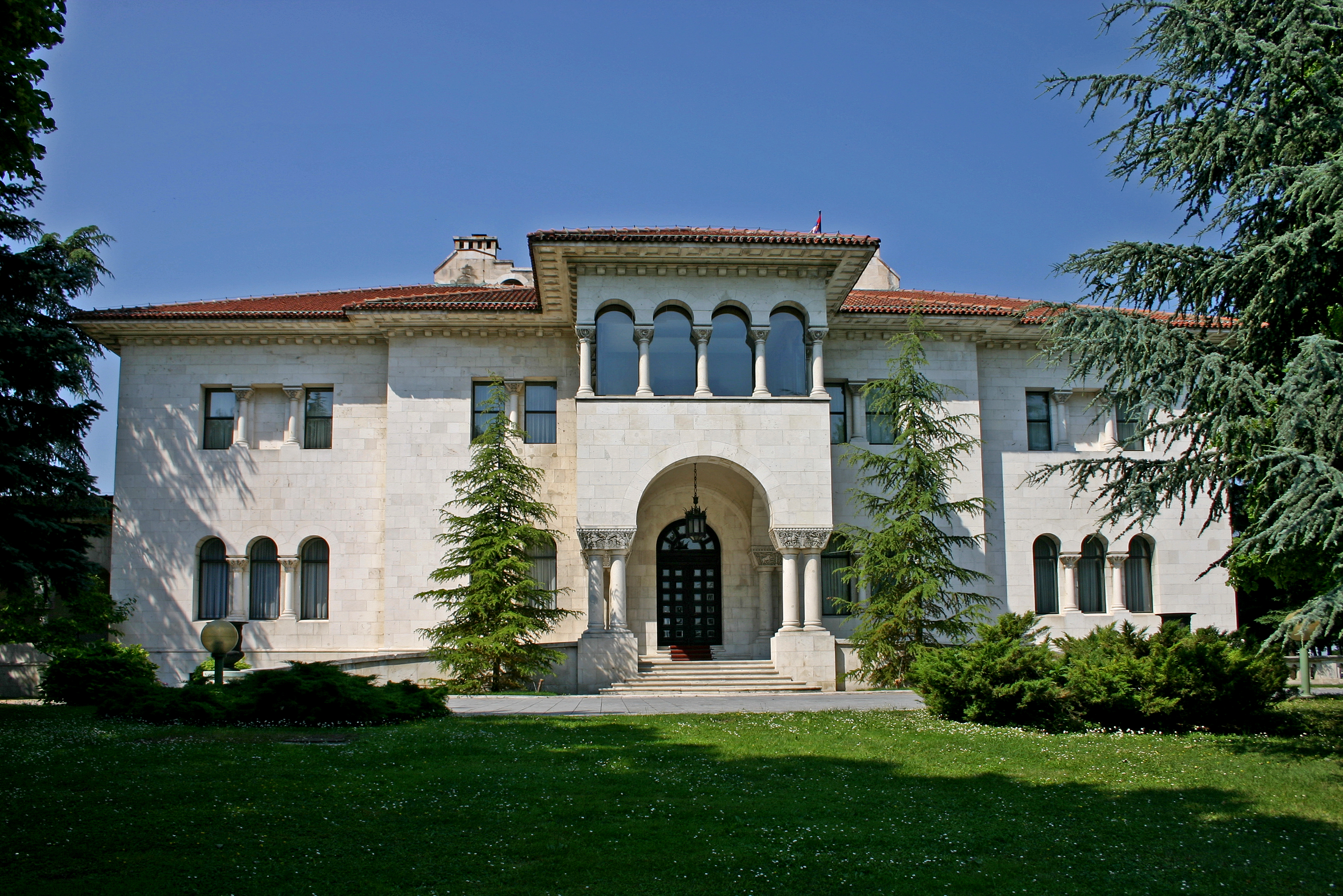
Main entrance

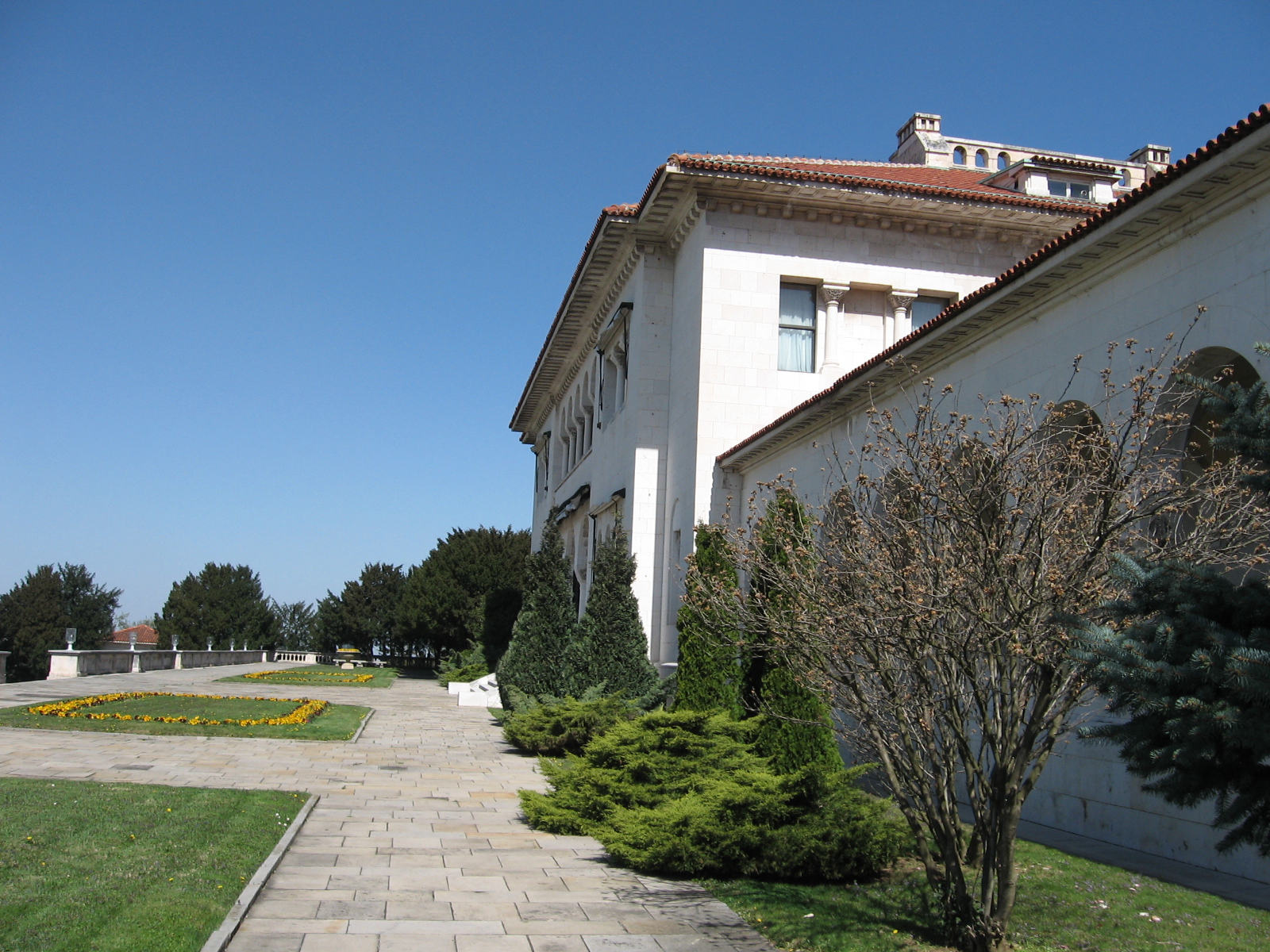
South facade

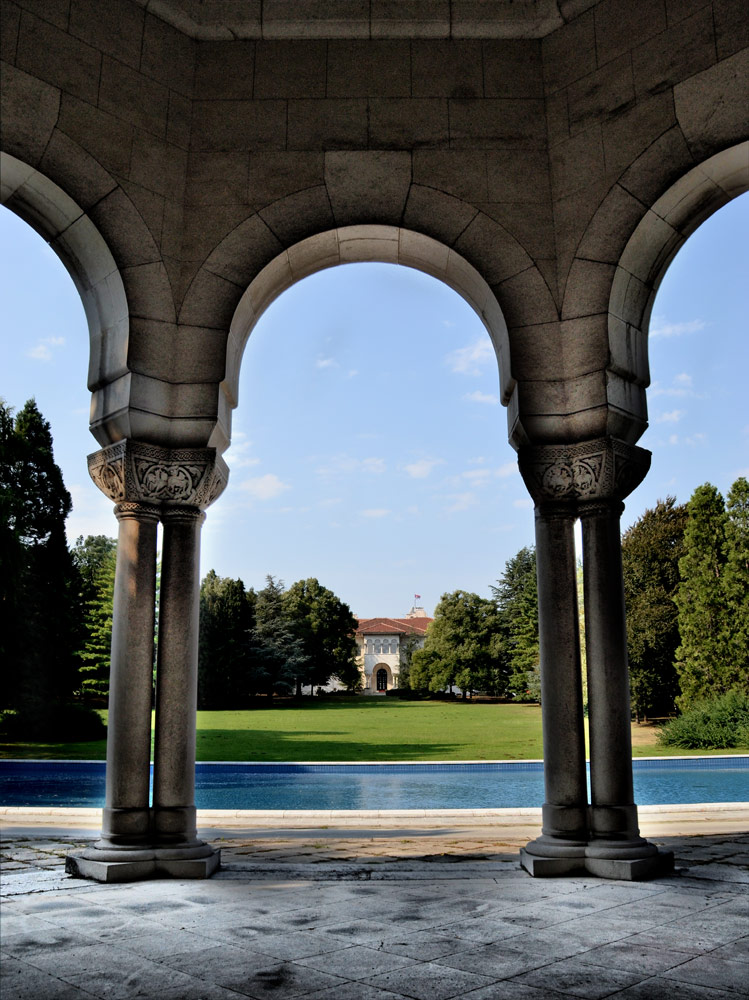
Garden

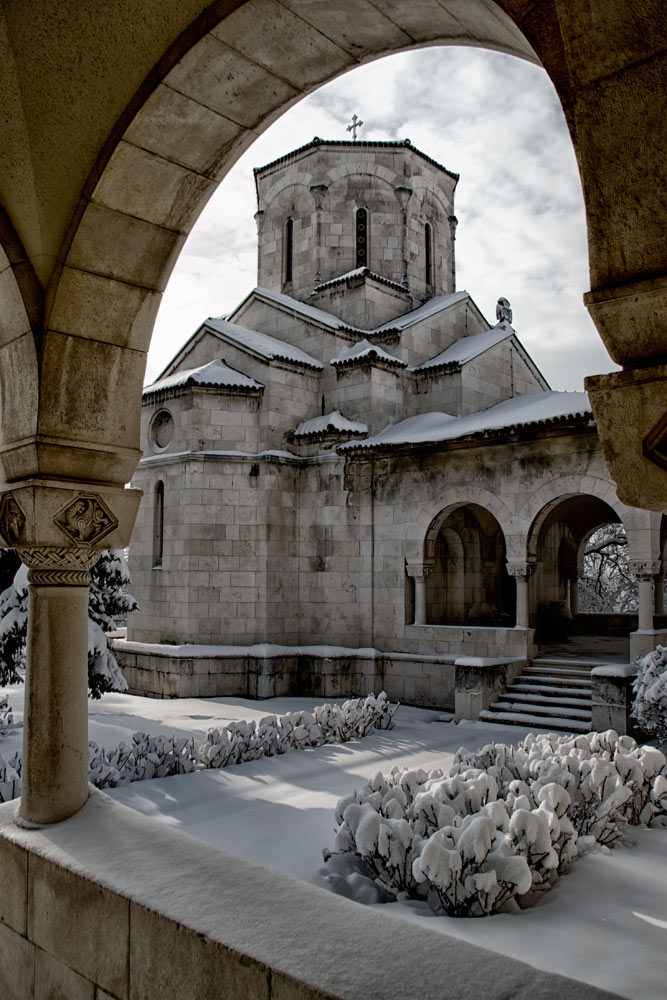
Royal Chapel

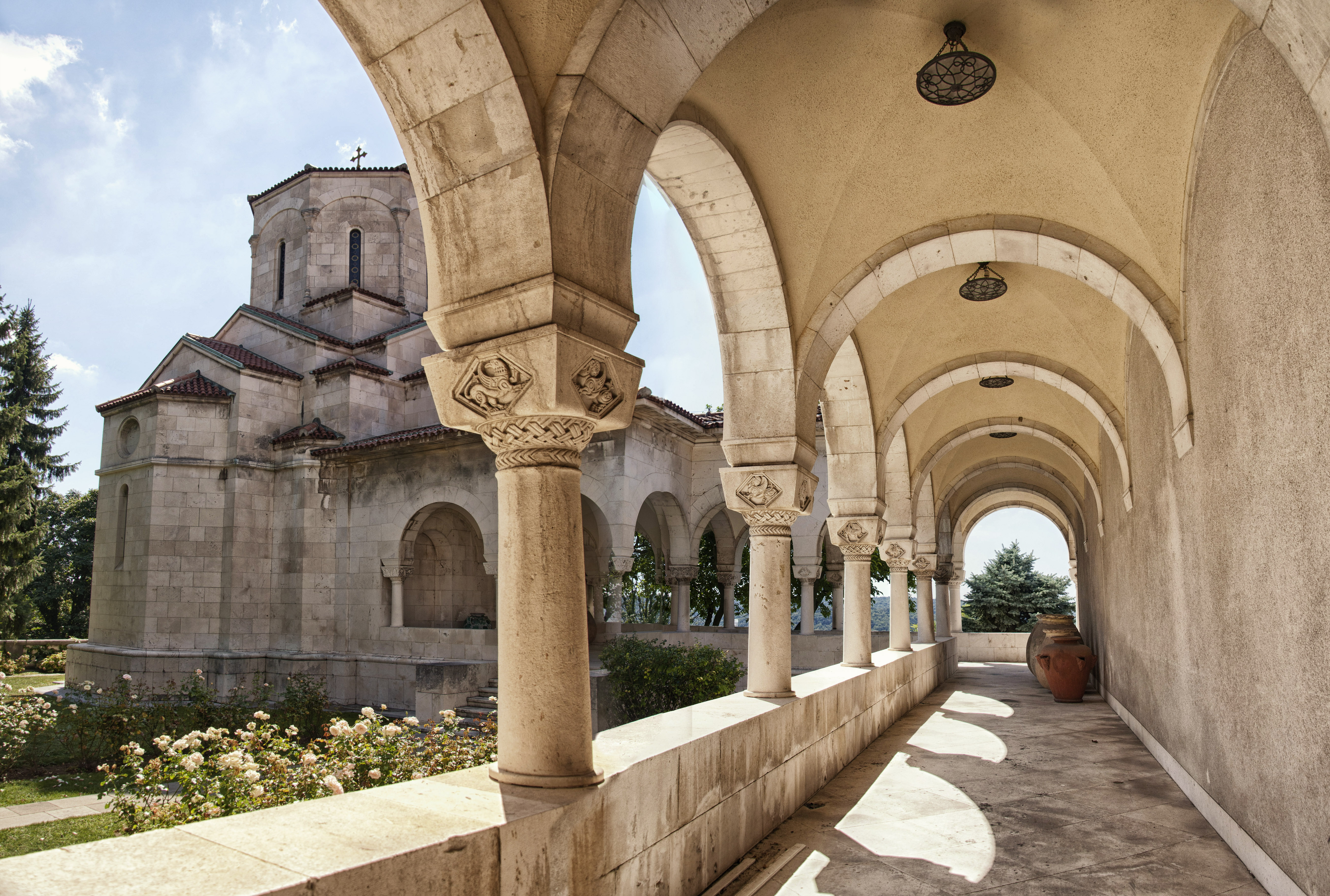
Royal Chapel

== See also ==
- List of Serbian royal residences
- List of official residences of Serbia
