= List of official residences of Serbia =

The official residences and representation houses of the Republic of Serbia are the properties owned by a Serbian state and are used for housing and reception of both domestic and foreign dignitaries.

== Official residences ==
The official residences are the residences owned by a Serbian state and their function is to house the President of the Republic and the Prime Minister during his or her term of office as they are the only state officials entitled by decree to have an official residence.

The official residences have domestic and maintenance staff, as well as the accommodation and premises necessary for daily life. The guarding and protection of the residences are provided by either the Guard of the Serbian Armed Forces (residence of the President of the Republic) or the Unit for the Protection of the Important Persons and Residences of the Police of Serbia (residence of the Prime Minister).

There are no strictly-designated "presidential" and "prime-ministerial" residences, which are a priori reserved for those office-holders. After assuming the office of the President of the Republic/Prime Minister, the authorities responsible (Secretariat-General of the President of the Republic and Secretariat-General of the Government) designate residences that office-holders will move into.

All official residences are located in Dedinje neighborhood of Belgrade.

=== Villa Mir ===
The Villa Mir is a residential building located at 2 Konavljanska Street and has area of 4,000 square metres (43,000 sq ft). It is currently used by the President of the Republic, primarily for informal receptions of visiting foreign dignitaries.

The Villa Mir was built in 1978–1979 for the lifelong Yugoslav president, Josip Broz Tito, but he never moved into it since at the time of building completion at the end of 1979 his health deteriorated rapidly and was transferred to the hospital, where he died four months afterwards. It was opened in 1984 as the Josip Broz Tito Memorial Museum. On the ground floor Tito's personal items and decorations from as many as 68 countries were displayed, on the first floor valuable objects of applied art made of silver and ivory were exhibited, while on second floor there was an archaeological collection. In the mid-1990s, the building was emptied of the collection which was transferred to the nearby Museum of Yugoslavia and refurbished for residential purposes in 1998. After the 1999 NATO bombing, the president of FR Yugoslavia, Slobodan Milošević, moved here, living there until 2001 when he was arrested in this house and taken to custody. In the late 2010s, building was thoroughly renovated.

=== Villa Bokeljka ===
The Villa Bokeljka (Serbian Cyrillic: Вила Бокељка, lit. 'Bay of Kotor Woman Villa') is a residential building located at 2a Tolstojeva Street and has area of 1,700 square metres (18,000 sq ft) while the entire villa complex, together with the gardens, covers an area of 1 hectare (2.5 acres). It is currently designated as the residence of the President of the Republic.

The villa was built in 1936 belonging to the royal House of Karađorđević and was bequeathed by the King Alexander I to the minor prince Tomislav. However, the circumstances after the World War II prevented the young prince from regaining his property. After the World War II, building was used as the residence of a high-ranking officials of the Communist Party of Yugoslavia. Since the 1980s up until the end of the century, building was used as the guest house for high-ranking foreign dignitaries. In 2001, Prime Minister Zoran Đinđić moved there and lived until his death in 2003 assassination. The villa underwent renovation in 2005.

=== Villa Bor ===
The Villa Bor (Serbian Cyrillic: Вила Бор, lit. 'Pine Villa') is a residential building located at 75 Kneza Aleksandra Boulevard and has area of 750 square metres (8,100 sq ft). It is currently used as the residence of the Prime Minister.

The Villa Bor was built in 1932 by the wealthy merchant Čedomir Petrović and designed by Stanislav Sobotka. Čedomir Petrović’s fate was similar to the fate of many wealthy Serbs who, after the World War II, were declared "enemies of the people" and members of "the old Serbian bourgeoisie" undesirable in the new communist system. After Tito's death in 1980, Jovanka Broz, the First Lady of Yugoslavia, was forcibly moved there from presidential residence at 15 Užička Street (Tito's lifelong residence, destroyed in 1999 NATO bombing), where she lived in seclusion until her death in 2013. By the time of her death the house was in a very bad condition with roof leaking and with broken heating system. In 2019–2020 residence has undergone complete renovation and, in 2021, the Prime Minister Ana Brnabić moved in there.

=== Villa at 23 Užička Street ===
The Villa at 23 Užička Street is a residential building with the area of 800 square metres (8,600 sq ft).

It was built in 1931 by a prominent royal physician, Dr Moačanin, who left the house with his family in 1941 after the bombing of Belgrade in the World War II. After the war, leading communist Edvard Kardelj, one of Josip Broz's closest associates, moved in and lived there up until the beginning of the 1960s. In the late 1960s it was briefly used by Mijalko Todorović, the president of the Federal Assembly. The federal authorities used it afterwards, among other things, to organize farewells to retirement of prominent officials and similar ceremonies. The Prime Minister of FR Yugoslavia, Milan Panić, lived there from 1992 to 1993. From 1998 to 2003 building was used as the residence of President of Serbia Milan Milutinović during his presidential tenure. Nataša Mićić, as acting president, briefly lived there in 2003. The president Tomislav Nikolić moved into the villa in 2012.

=== Villa at 21 Užička Street ===
The Villa at 21 Užička Street is a residential building with the area of 310 square metres (3,300 sq ft).

It is currently designated state guest house used as an official residence for visiting foreign dignitaries during state visits or for other important events.

== Representation houses ==
Representation houses are located throughout the country.

=== The King's Villa and The Queen's Villa ===
The King's Villa and The Queen's Villa are state representation houses located on wooded slopes of Oplenac Hill overlooking the town of Topola. They are part of Oplenac compound of the royal House of Karađorđević, which also includes the Saint George Church (the mausoleum of the royal house where 26 members and six generations of the Karađorđević dynasty have been buried) as well as royal vineyards and winery.

The King's Villa's (Serbian: Краљева вила, romanized: Kraljeva vila) construction started in 1914 by King Peter I but because of the outbreak of the World War I the works were stopped and was completed only in 1923. The villa is harmoniously composed, has a basement and a mansard, and served as a working and residential space, well integrated with the private space used by the royal family. The interior was decorated with artistic paintings (according to the 1930 census, there were 114 of them), as well as three busts. The paintings were arranged in the hall, the king's cabinet, the queen's room and in the mansard. Prince Tomislav lived in the villa from his return from exile in 1990 until his death in 2000.

The Queen's Villa (Serbian: Краљичина вила, romanized: Kraljičina vila) was built in 1926 and was primarily used by the Queen Maria.

=== Villa Zlatni Breg ===
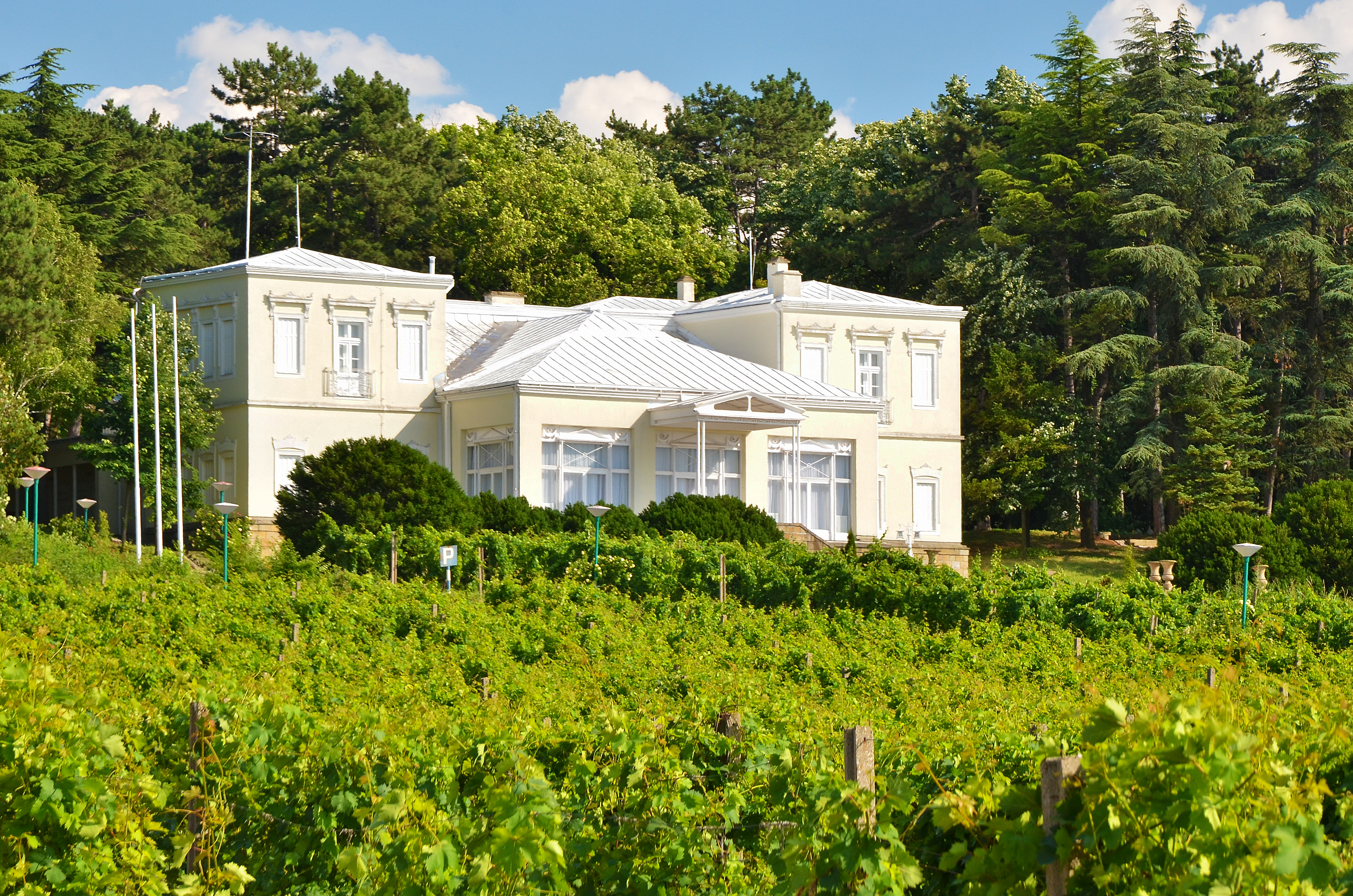
Villa Zlatni Breg

The Villa Zlatni Breg (Serbian Cyrillic: Вила Златни брег, lit. 'Golden Hill Villa') also known as the Obrenović Summerhouse (Serbian: Летњиковац Обреновића, romanized: Letnjikovac Obrenovića) is a state representation house located on the western outskirts of the town of Smederevo. It is located on the northern slopes of the Plavinac hill, overseeing the Danube from its right bank, and the Banat lowlands across the river. Besides villa compound includes surrounding parkas well as vineyard.

The villa was built in 1865 and expanded several times since then and used as summerhouse for members of the royal House of Obrenović. In 1827, Prince Miloš Obrenović purchased the 37 hectares (91 acres) lot from a local Ottoman sipahi. The lot already had a planted vineyard, orchard, meadows, a house and steam bath. In 1831 the prince planted his own vineyards on the estate. The original house was built in 1865 by Prince Mihailo. During the reign of King Milan I, the villa served as a venue for the royal parties and gatherings of the cultural and artistic elite. Next to the villa, Milan built the very first courts for tennis and cricket in the country. The declaration of Serbia into the kingdom in 1882 was announced here. King Alexander often used villa for his official businesses – holding ministerial sessions, signing appointments and royal decrees, and receiving foreign envoys. After the overthrow of Obrenović dynasty in 1903, the Queen Natalie bequeathed the villa to Colonel Antonije Orešković. During World War I the house was heavily damaged in the 1914 Battle of Smederevo between the invading Austro-Hungarian army and the Serbian forces. It was later further damaged in the frequent German bombardments. During World War II, Germans set their local command in the building. They took with them some of the furniture and valuable artifacts. After the World War II, it became the state property as it was confiscated from the Orešković family and was used by the Ministry of Internal Affairs. President Josip Broz Tito often spent time in the villa with his foreign guests, starting with Ahmed Sukarno in 1956. Though constantly used in official capacity, it was in 2011 that President Boris Tadić publicly showed the villa as an official state venue, when he organized a meeting there with the prime ministers of Croatia and Slovenia, Jadranka Kosor and Borut Pahor, respectively. His successors, Tomislav Nikolić and Aleksandar Vučić, continued occasionally to use the venue for official purposes. Both Chinese president Xi Jinping and Slovenian prime minister Miro Cerar had official bunket in the villa in 2016.

=== Villa Kopaonik ===
Villa Kopaonik (Serbian Cyrillic: Вила Копаоник), built in 1937, is state representation house located on a slight elevation above the Banjski Park in Vrnjačka Banja, spa town in central Serbia.

=== Hunting lodge Vorovo ===
Hunting lodge Vorovo (Serbian: Ловачка кућа Ворово, romanized: Lovačka kuća Vorovo) is a part of the hunting ground Vorovo near the village of Erdevik, on the western slopes of Fruška Gora. The hunting ground covers an area of about 700 hectares (1,700 acres) with 2 types of deer (red deer and fallow deer) as well as wild boar and mouflon.

== See also ==
- List of Serbian royal residences
