= Terazije =

Town square in Belgrade

- City square
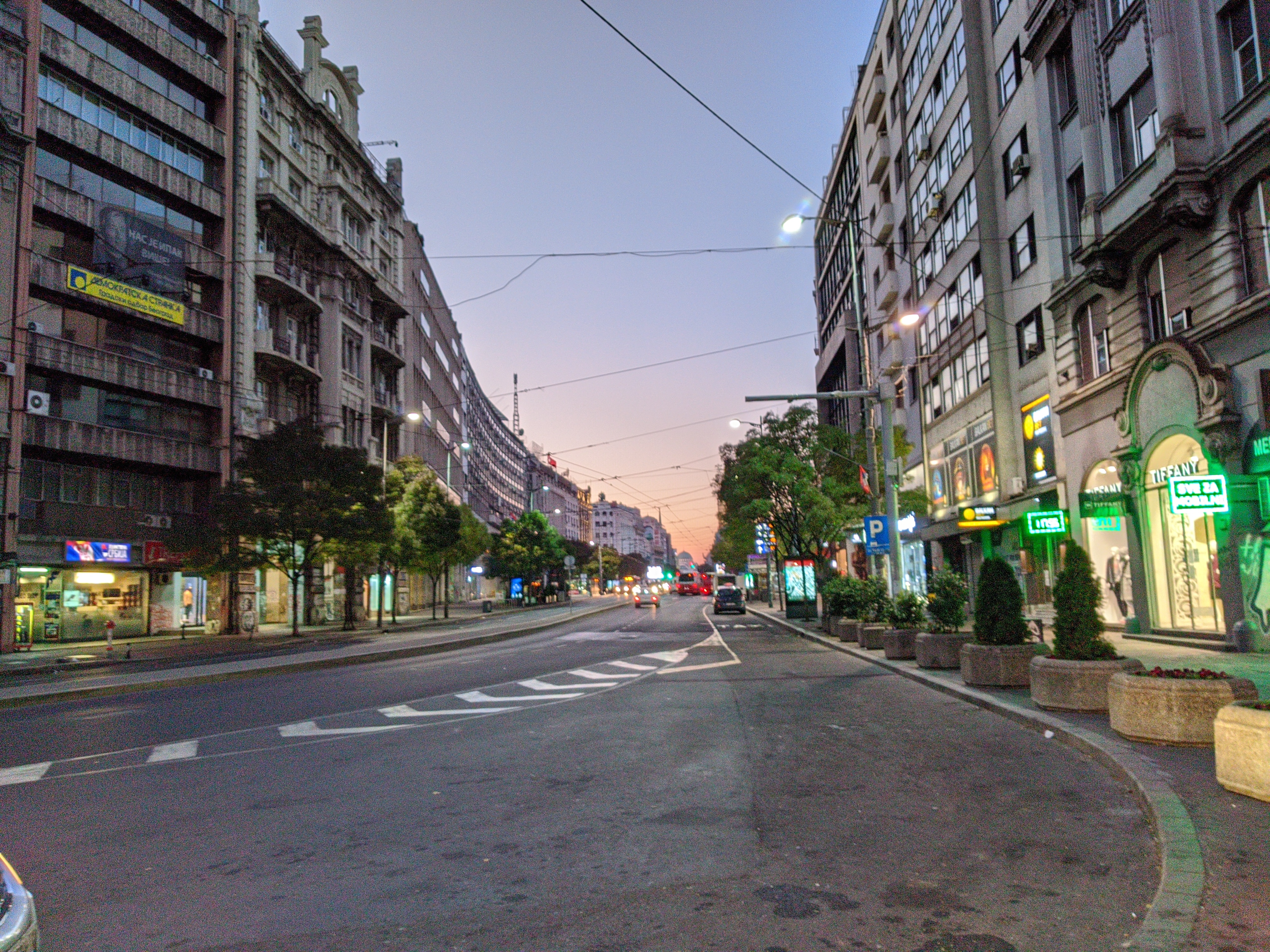
- Opened: 1840s
- Owner: City of Belgrade
- Location: Belgrade, Serbia
- Location within Belgrade
- Coordinates: 44°48′49″N 20°27′40″E

Terazije (Serbian Cyrillic: Теразије) is the central town square and the surrounding neighborhood of Belgrade, Serbia. It is located in the municipality of Stari Grad.

Today, Terazije has primarily function of the main transit square, surrounded by the important public buildings, cultural institutions, hotels, public monuments and parks. Though not classically shaped square, Terazije was historically important as the gathering spot and the former business and commercial center of Belgrade. With the Knez Mihailova Street, which extends to the northeast connecting directly Terazije and Belgrade Fortress, the square is one of the oldest and most recognizable ambience units of Belgrade. Due to its historical and cultural importance, Terazije was declared a protected spatial cultural-historical unit in January 2020.

== Location ==
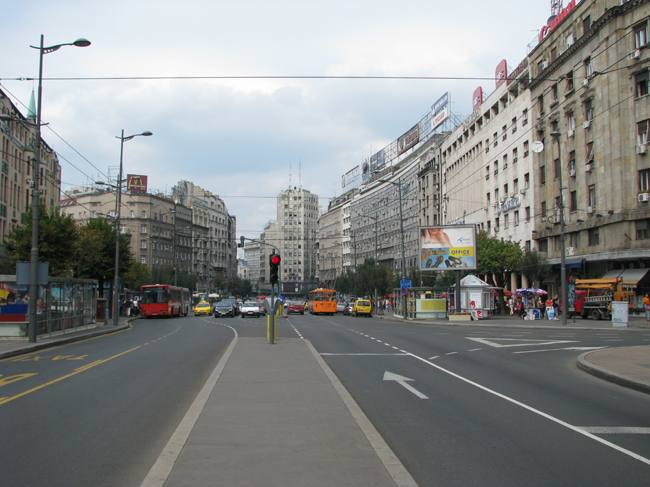
Terazije square

Despite the fact that many Belgraders consider the Republic Square or Kalemegdan to be the city's centerpiece areas, Terazije is Belgrade's designated center. When street numbers are assigned to the streets of Belgrade, numeration begins from the part of the street closest to Terazije.

Terazije itself is also a short street, connected by the King Milan Street, the main street in Belgrade, to the Slavija square, by the Nikola Pašić Square to the King Alexander Boulevard, the longest street in Belgrade, by Prizrenska street to the neighborhood of Zeleni Venac and further to New Belgrade, and by the Kolarčeva street to the Square of the Republic. The neighborhood also borders Andrićev Venac and Pioneers Park on the southeast, Park Aleksandrov on the south and neighborhood of Varoš Kapija on the west. A small, covered square of Bezistan connects it to the Nikola Pašić Square.

== Etymology ==
With regard to the origin of the name Terazije, the historian and writer Milan Đ. Milićević wrote: "In order to supply Belgrade with water, the Turks built towers at intervals along the đeriza or an aqueduct, a water supply system which brought water in from the springs at Veliki Mokri Lug. The water was piped up into the towers for the purpose of increasing the pressure, in order to carry it further. Those towers were: one, where the Terazije Fountain is today (roughly at the small square between the [hotels] Balkan and Moskva; second was where the Ruski car Tavern is; and the third was where kafana Grčka Kraljica is now. The tallest of the three was the one at Terazije. That tower, beside its height, also stood on the spacious clearance, away from the surrounding houses and was taller than any of the neighboring buildings. All those towers were called "water terazije" by the Turks. Because of that, the entire neighborhood of the new section of Belgrade, especially the one between the Stari Dvor and close to the Stambol Gate, is today called Terazije".

For the word itself, it literally means "[water] scales", more commonly known as "water balances" or su terazisi. But the tower-like structures were more than just scales - they were maintaining water pressure when conveying water to neighbourhoods at a high-level. The towers were 3 to 10 m (9.8 to 32.8 ft) tall and had a cistern at the summit from which the water flowed into distribution pipes. The Ottoman đeriza followed the route of the ancient aqueduct from the period of Singidunum, the Roman predecessor of Belgrade.

== History ==
=== Before 1800 ===
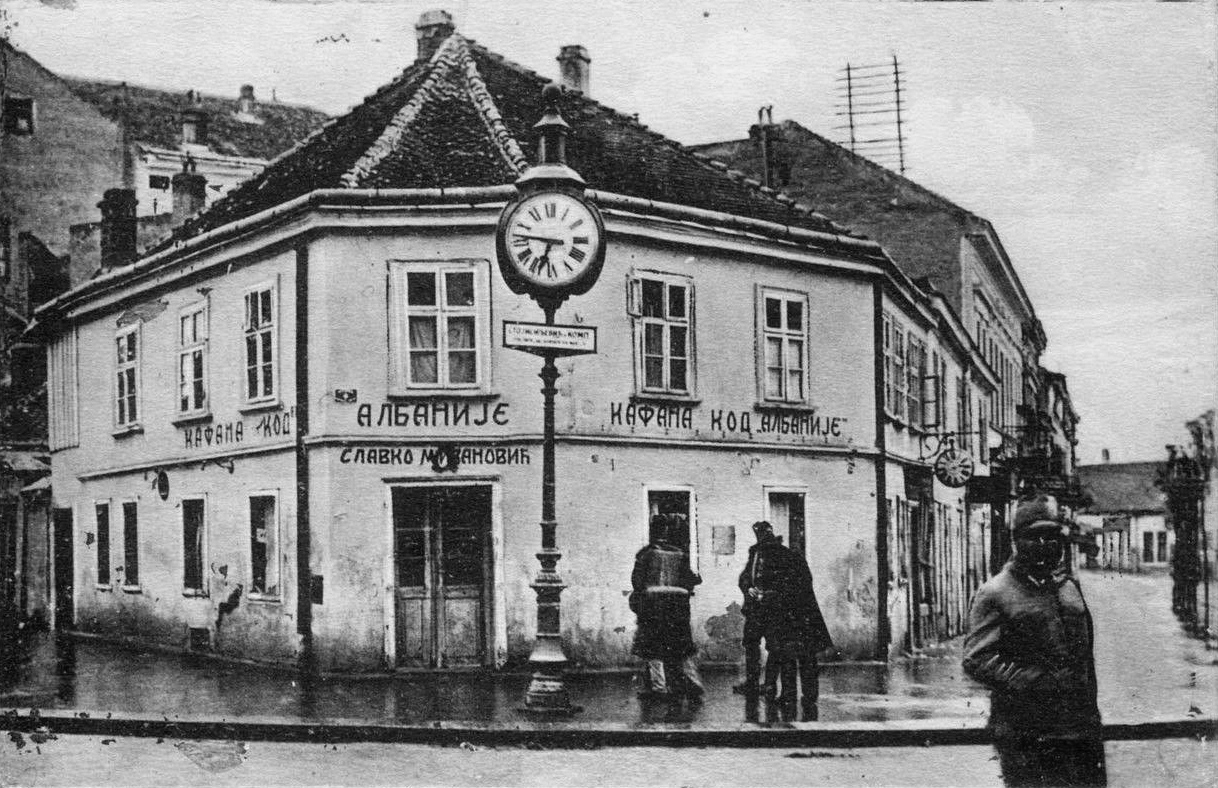
Old kafana "Kod Albanije" in the 1910s. Belgrade's first public clock is in the front

The top of the Terazije Ridge is rich in water springs. Water used to run down the slope, where the modern Prizrenska Street is, into the Zeleni Venac area. Zeleni Venac is built in the area that was previously part of the trench which surrounded the Belgrade Fortress in the 18th century. When the trench was covered, a pond was formed, partially filled by the stream from Terazije. Today's central city square turned into the bog filled in sludge and covered with overgrowth. Local population visited the pond hunting for ducks. It was recorded that during the cold winters, wolves would reach the pond. The draining of the pond began in the 1830s, but the underground water from Terazije still soaks the land between Terazije and the Sava river.

=== 1800–1850 ===
Being outside of the moat and the city walls at the time, it was considered "distant" by the citizens. As it was located in front of the Stambol Gate and close to the Tsarigrad Road, some artisan shops and khans developed in time. The road was leading through the gate into the city and across the moat. Also, the existence of the water tower, with drinking fountain, helped the area to become sort of the "parking lot" in front of the city entrance.

After the collapse of the First Serbian Uprising, the Ottomans regained Belgrade in October 1813, and their vanguards burned wooden hovels in Savamala neighborhood. When the main Ottoman army landed, a large number of people got stranded on the bank in Savamala, trying to flee across the Sava into Austria. Men were massacred, while women and children were enslaved. People were impaled on stakes along city's main roads so a rows of impaled people were placed from the Stambol Gate to Terazije, and nearby, along the Tsarigrad Road, from the Batal mosque to Tašmajdan.

Terazije started to take shape as an urban feature in the first half of the 19th century. In the 1840s, Serbian ruling prince Miloš Obrenović wanted to resettle Serbian population from the old moated town where they had been mixed with the Turkish inhabitants, and from the neighborhood of Savamala on the bank of the Sava river in order to modernize it. He ordered Serbian craftsmen, especially blacksmiths, cartwrights and coppersmiths, to build their houses and shops on the location of the present square, an empty, inhabited area spreading in front of the Stambol Gate. Also, the move was intended to prevent the fires being lit all over the town and tone down the noise made by these specific types of artisans.

However, the craftsmen and artisans refused to relocate, especially the residents of Savamala as prince Miloš planned to relocate them even further than Terazije, to the then distant village of Palilula, "behind God's back". The prince resorted to violence. He gathered his henchmen and thugs and sent them to Savamala in 1835. As the settlement was still just a shanty town, with houses made of rotten wood and mud, all the houses were demolished in one day, without any demolition equipment. Additionally, the ustabasha, chief of the cartwright and blacksmith guild, was publicly beaten, receiving 25 hits. The artisans then agreed to relocate.

Ilija Čarapić, the president of the Belgrade Municipality 1834–1835 and 1839–1840, had a special task of assigning the parcels in Terazije to these craftsmen and whoever accepted to fence the lot on his own, would have it for free. One of the lots was granted by prince Miloš to his favorite architect, Hadži Nikola Živković. Driving together in the coach one day, prince asked Živković to whom belongs one of the lots without the fence. Živković replied it was his, but the prince said: Well, now it's not yours anymore, when you failed to fence it all this time.

Politician and a businessman Stojan Simić, member of the influential Simić family, purchased the lot at the end of Terazije in the late 1830s. It was a piece of marshland which encompassed the modern features of Stari dvor, Pioneers Park and Park Aleksandrov. By the summer of 1840, he drained the marsh, filled and leveled the terrain and on the northern side of the modern Kralja Milana street built a luxurious mansion from 1840 to 1842. The edifice became known as the Old Konak. Development of the first Serbian royal compound began in 1843, when the state leased the mansion, with the surrounding garden, as the court for the ruling prince Alexander Karađorđević. As the royal family now moved into the neighborhood, first regulatory plan for Terazije, which envisioned it as the new commercial and business center of Belgrade, was drafted in 1843.

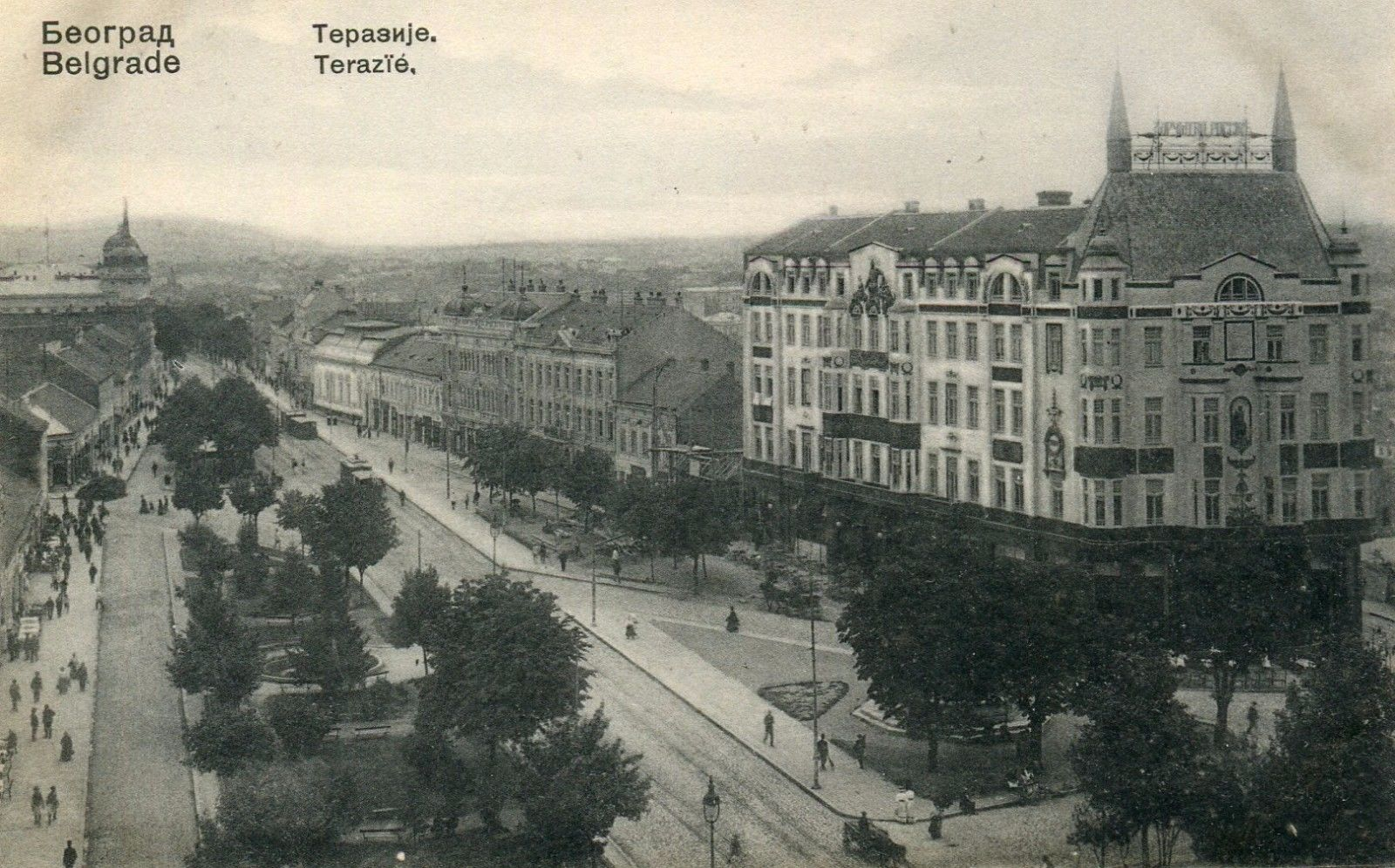
Terazije in early 1920s

=== 1850–1900 ===
The idea for the monument to Karađorđe, leader of the First Serbian Uprising from 1804 to 1813, appeared in 1853 and the proposed location was Terazije First official proposal came in 1857, from Toma Vučić-Perišić, one of the leaders of the Defenders of the Constitution. Though Ottoman administration over Serbia was limited at the time, it was still strong enough to prevent building of the monument. They couldn't allow a memorial to the bitter enemy of their empire. After the Saint Andrew's Day Assembly in 1858–1859, dethroned Miloš Obrenović was restored to power and the idea of erecting a monument to Karađorđe on Terazije was abandoned.

The "Kasina" kafana and later hotel was built in 1858. It was named as the gambling was organized for the VIP members (female variant of the word casino). Clientele originally included members of the Serbian Progressive Party. National Assembly of Serbia was seated in the venue's hall for a while in 1918, and until 1920 the National Theatre held performances here, too. In 1860 the kafana "Kod Albanije" ("Chez Albania"), was opened. A small, crummy house, built in the oriental, Turkish style, with yellow façade, it was very popular. The clock in front of it was the first public clock in Belgrade, so it became the most popular meeting point in the city. It was demolished to make way for the Palace Albanija, which was finished in 1939.

Starting in 1859, Atanasije Nikolić, educator and agriculturist, planted a number of chestnut trees on Terazije, in the process of making Belgrade greener, where Nikolić, as an engineer and an urbanist, was also charged with arranging the Košutnjak and Topčider parks, and avenues along Terazije and Topčider Road, and other streets. He grew seedlings in the nursery garden he personally established in Topčider during the 1830s, when he arranged the park. The chestnut avenue in Terazije was planted in double rows. Up to about 1865, the buildings at Terazije were mainly single and double-storied. The water tower was removed in 1860 and replaced by the drinking fountain, "Terazijska česma", which was erected in to celebrate the second rule of Prince Miloš Obrenović. During the first reconstruction of the square in 1911, the chestnut avenue was cut, while the česma was moved to Topčider in 1912.

In 1860, construction of the Palace with Towers, next to the Old Konak began. It was intended to be the palace of the heir apparent prince Mihailo Obrenović. The prince never used it, residing mostly in the Little Palace which he built next to the Old Konak, while his court hosted the ministries of interior and foreign affairs. The building was designed by Kosta Šrepalović. On 24 May 1860, privately owned predecessor of the public transport in Belgrade was organized. The omnibus line was operated by the diligences. Its starting point was in Terazije, at the kafana "Kod Zlatnog Venca", and connected it to Topčider. The enterprise wasn't much lucrative so the owner Luka Jakovljević sold it in 1861 to Milan Tešić, who expanded the line from Terazije to Varoš Kapija and lifted the price to 3 groschen.

Terazije Quarter was officially formed on 3 March 1860, so Terazije administratively became part of Belgrade, so as the other neighborhoods outside of the former trench. After the incident at the Čukur Fountain, Ottoman garrison withdrew from the Stambol Gate. The gate was demolished from 26 April to 31 May 1866, removing the last "scar" which divided city parts on the opposite sides of the trench, thus making Terazije one urban unit with the older part of the city. This prompted accelerated urbanization, not only of Terazije, but of the other neighborhoods outside of the old city limits. When the first horsecar was introduced in Belgrade, on 14 October 1892, the station was located in Terazije, next to the fountain.

The Little Palace was demolished in April and May 1881 to make way for the Stari Dvor. Designed by Aleksandar Bugarski, it was built on the orders by the prince, later king Milan Obrenović. The foundation stone was laid on 23 June 1881 and the building was finished by 1883.

=== 1900–1918 ===
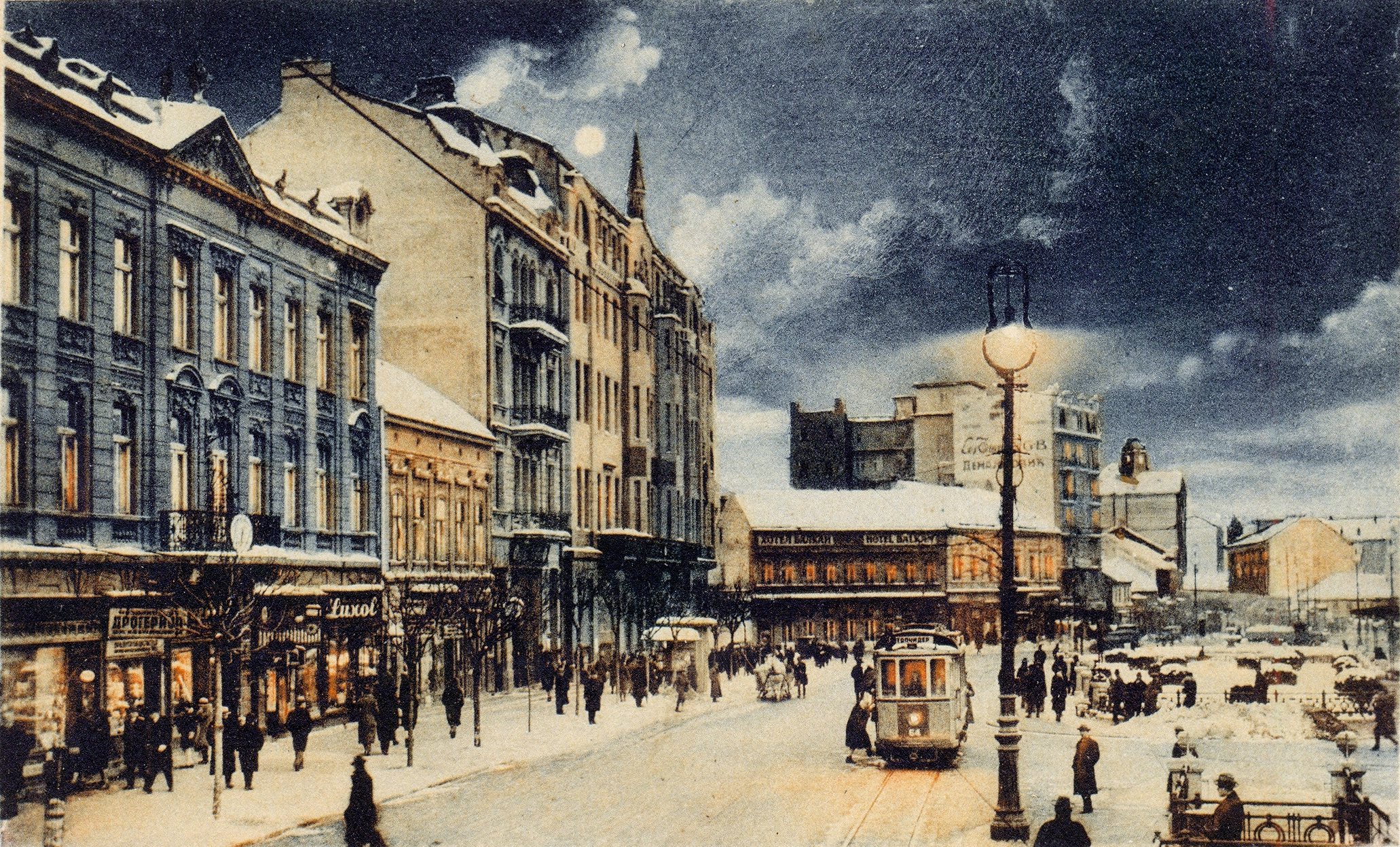
Terazije in the beginning of the 20th century

By the turn of the century, the square formed with an "egg-shaped" base, where the Palace Albanija is today. Near this base, a low, yellow house was built, with several toy and slipper stores covered with roller shutters (ćepenak) at the ground level. The upper floor was the seat of the "Zvezda" monthly magazine, edited by Janko Veselinović. The "Zlatni Krst" kafana was built next to it, today replaced with the highrise built in the 1960s. There was also an "Albanez" inn, sort of students' mess hall, as its clientele were mostly high and middle school students, and their professors. Next to it was "Zlatna Slavina" inn, frequently visited by the journalists and writers, adjoined by the bookstore and publishing house. The old hotel "Balkan" with one floor leaned on it. A bit protruding was the bakery ("bread shop") famous at the time for its products (egg burek, various kifli, pogačice, hot kaymak lepinjas).

In May 1904, the insurance company "Rusija" purchased the estate of Nikola Vuković across the "Balkan", which adjoined the fountain. It included house and the "Velika Srbija" inn. The "Velika Srbija" was known for good food and wine, and was demolished and replaced by the Hotel Moskva by 30 January 1908. Around it, there were several small shops and grocery stores. Further away was the "Viktorović" pharmacy, with distinction of being demolished in the bombings in both World Wars. Close to it were the house of Lazar Arsenijević Batalaka and kafana "Kod Dva Tigra". Disreputable at the time, it was later replaced with the Palace Atina building and the famous 1970s and 1980s "Atina" restaurant. A bit away was the Krsmanović House, or later known as the Protocol Building. Purchased by the Krsmanović brothers, it was the location of the 1918 unification proclamation of the Kingdom of the Serbs, Croats and Slovenes.

On the other side of the square was a Renaissance-style administrative building that hosted the offices of the Terazije Quarter. At the corner, there was the "Todorović" delicatessen, later replaced with the Igumanov's Palace. One of the oldest kafanas in Belgrade, "Šiškova Kafana", was also on this side of Terazije. Gathering place of the Liberas, the one-storey building had a garden, offered newspapers and was known for political debates. It was later demolished and replaced with cinema "Beograd". Close to it was a string of other kafanas: "Takovo", considered quite a distinguished venue, "Pariz" and "Uroševa Pivnica". The "Pariz" was a gathering place for the People's Radical Party members, while the "Uroševa Pivnica" was a typical inn for the travelers from the interior.

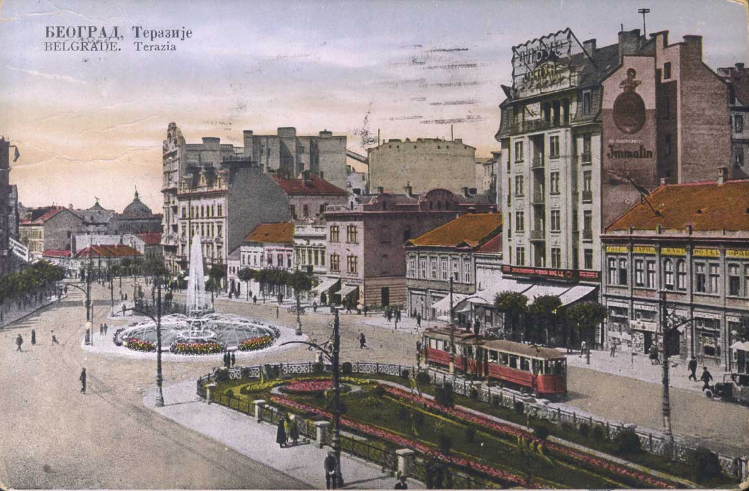
Terazije in 1934

At the corner of the Skopljanska (today Nušićeva) Street and Terazije, there was the "Zunane" glass shop. It was later purchased by Tomaš Rosulek who turned it into the delicatessen. One of the former Robne kuće Beograd department stores occupies the lot today. Down from the Rosulek store was a well known "Pantelić" pastry shop, famous for its confectionery. There was a narrow extension of the square in this area, in the direction of the goldsmith Mihailo P. Petković's store, where the row of fiakers was usually parked.

The Old Konak was demolished in 1904, while the Palace with Towers was torn down in 1911. Its demolition made space for the planned Novi Dvor. The foundation stone was laid in 1911. However, due to the ensuing strings of wars, it was completed only in 1922. Today, Stari Dvor serves as the Belgrade City Hall, while Novi Dvor hosts the Presidency of Serbia.

Under the mayor Ljubomir Davidović, the Technical Administration of Belgrade Municipality organized architectural design competition for complete rearrangement of Terazije in March 1911. Stipulations included removal of the fountain. In the summer of 1911, the plan was developed, headed by the special commission constituted specifically for this purpose and headed by architect Édouard Léger. Most of the provisions envisioned by the project were built: new wide paved sidewalks, formation of the square, a fountain, change in tram tracks for better and faster traffic and removal of the public pissoirs. A monument to Dositej Obradović, which was projected, was erected in a different neighborhood.

The changes in 1911–1913 were significant and the square was completely re-arranged. With Léger, major work was done by the architects Veselin Lučić, who designed the project, and Jelisaveta Načić. Along the central part of the square regular flower beds were placed, surrounded by a low iron fence. Refurbishment included artistic candelabra, public three-faced clock, a special kiosk in the Serbian-Byzantine style, circle bars for the protection of the trees in the avenue and granite curbs. On the side towards today's Nušićeva street a large Terazije fountain was built in 1927. At the end of the 19th and the beginning of the 20th century, Terazije was the centre of social life of Belgrade.

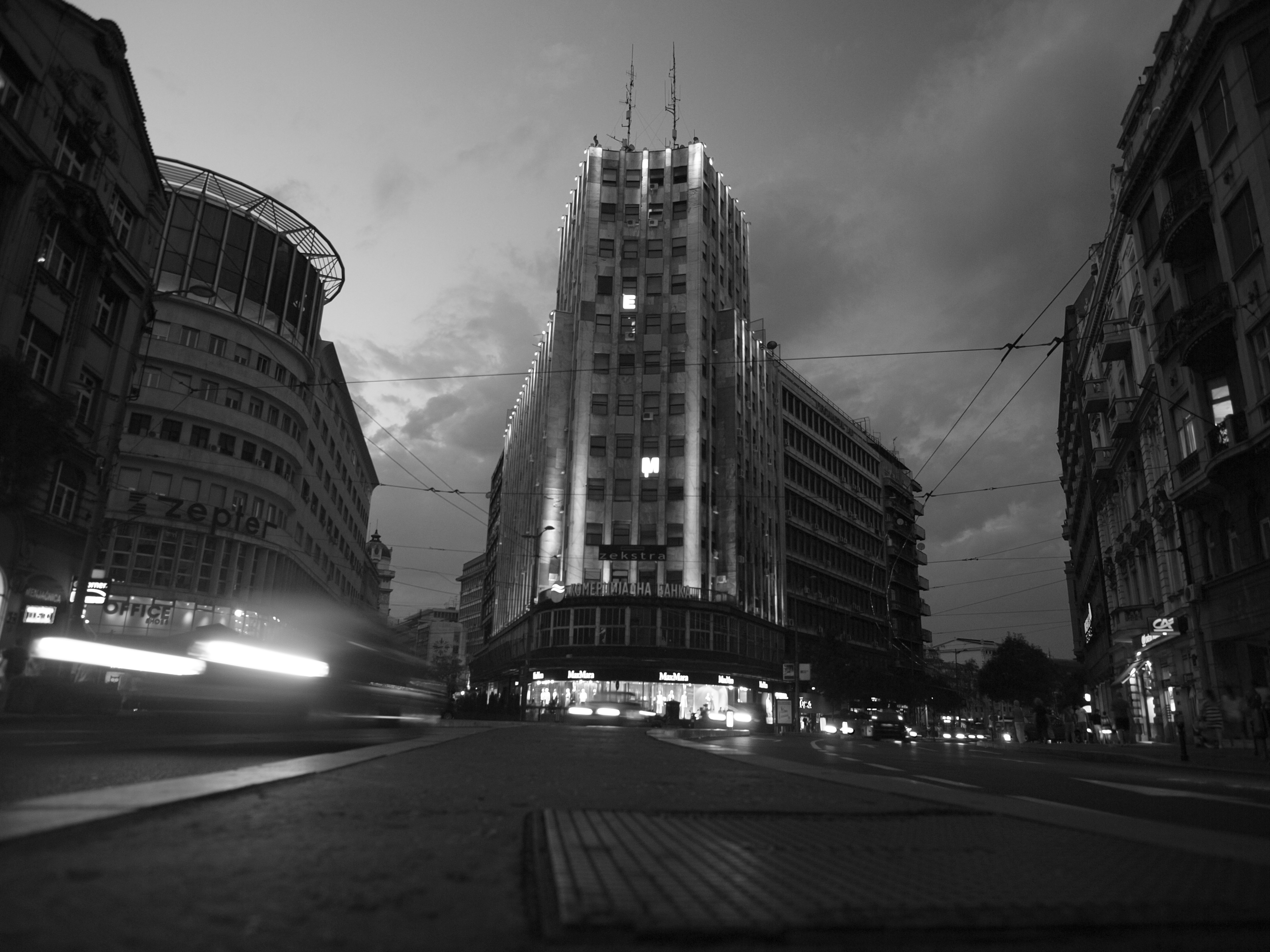
Palace Albania, finished in 1939

In 1913, Davidović's city administration decided to change the name of the square into the Prestolonaslednikov trg ("Heir's apparent square"), referring to prince Alexander, future king Alexander I of Yugoslavia. Another decision was to build the fountain on the square which would include the monument to victory. The ideas came after the Balkan Wars and were triggered by the ceremonial entry of the Serbian army in Belgrade after the war ended, and the construction of the Karađorđe monument in Kalemegdan. Due to World War I which ensued shortly after, the decisions weren't fully implemented: the name wasn't changed, the monument was relocated to the Belgrade Fortress, while the short-lived fountain was ultimately built. Načić designed the triumphal arch which was placed in Terazije in order to celebrate Serbian soldiers from the Balkan Wars 1912–1913. She placed an inscription "Not all Serbs are liberated" on the arch, pointing to the position of the Serbs in Austria-Hungary. During the occupation in World War I, Austro-Hungarian authorities arrested Načić and expelled her to the internment camp at Neusiedl am See.

The neighborhood was damaged during the World War I, especially during the heavy Austro-Hungarian bombardment in 1914–1915, prior to occupation. Terazije was described as desolate, empty and destroyed by the grenades. The ground cracked, underground canals collapsed, and the surrounding buildings were demolished. Serbian army had no proper ammunition to fight the Austrian gunboats, so they freely fired at the city from the Sava river. Resident Slavka Mihajlović wrote: "Terazije were completely dug up by the projectiles. Covered in mounds of cobblestone and concrete. Chestnut trees were laying on the ground, uprooted by the shelling. Not a living soul anywhere, like the town has died". Austro-Hungarian army temporarily entered Belgrade, from 3 to 14 December 1914. Already on 4 December they erected gallows on Terazije for hanging civilians.

=== Interbellum ===
Despite complete urbanization, local farmers, up to the 1920s, were illegally selling goods of the ox carts on and around Terazije. It was one of the reasons for city administration to build a large Zeleni Venac farmers market, on Zeleni Venac, below Terazije. Also despite being the sole center of the city, some areas evaded urbanization until the late 1930s, like the Kuzmanović Yard.

This was period of building various highrise buildings ("palaces"). At No. 10, a Modernist building was constructed in the mid-1930s. It was designed by Đorđe Đorđević in pure style, with the typical geometry of Modernism represented by the step-like risalit. Modern Hotel Balkan was built in 1935, Igumanov's Palace in 1938, while Palace Albania was finished in 1939.

=== World War II ===
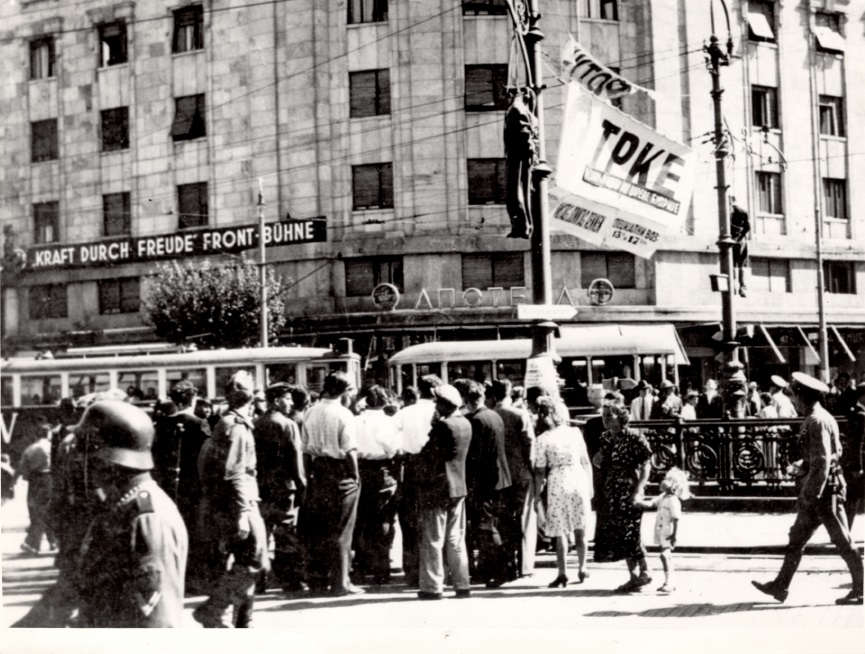
1941 hanging in Terazije

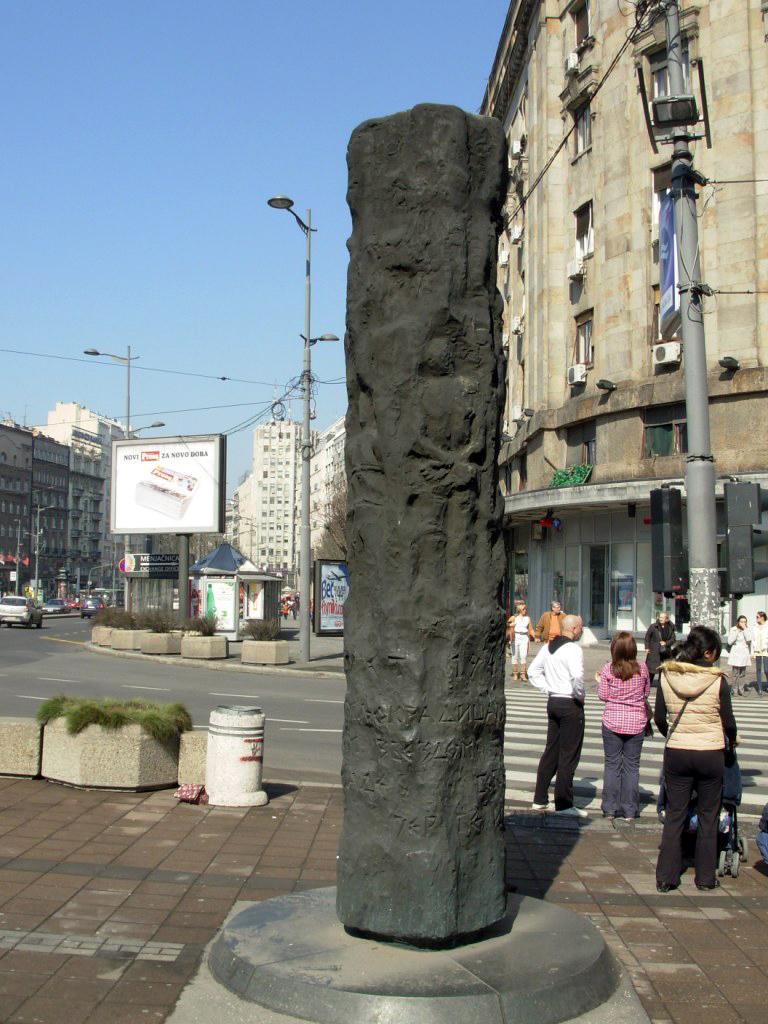
Monument to the 1941 victims

In order to "effectively intimidate the population" and discourage the people from fighting the occupiers, a military commander of Serbia Heinrich Danckelmann and the head of the Belgrade Gestapo Carl Krauss ordered a killing of five Serbs on Terazije. The executed victims were Velimir Jovanović (b.1893) and Ratko Jević (b. 1913), farmers, Svetislav Milin (b. 1915), a shoemaker, Jovan Janković (b.1920), a tailor, and Milorad Pokrajac (b. 1924), a high school student, only 17 years old. They were arrested, accused of alleged terrorist activities and brutally tortured before being shot in the yard of the Gestapo headquarters. The entire ordeal happened on 17 August 1941. Their corpses were then hanged on the light poles on Terazije.

For a long time, it was claimed that bodies were left for days, while the Belgraders were "sitting in restaurants and drinking cold beer". Historian Milan Koljanin wrote that this was a negative stereotype pushed for a decades. Police reports from the period say that some citizens calmly paid respect, but others gathered, with parents bringing children and professors their students, showing to them what the "new German culture" actually looks like. As the hanging was announced by the Germans in the press, and the news and photos were published, the bodies were removed on the evening of the same day. On the same day, a procession of the Volksdeutsche units marched next to the hanged victims, marking the 224th anniversary of Prince Eugene of Savoy taking Belgrade in 1717.

A monument to commemorate the crime was erected in 1981 by the city. Titled "Monument to the hanged patriots" and sculptured by Nikola Janković, the obelisk-shaped monument is 4 m (13 ft) tall with a diameter of 80 cm (31 in). It is posted on the marble pedestal and has carvings representing the scenes of the hanging and commemorative lyrics by the poet Vasko Popa. In 1983 a memorial bronze plaque, work of Slave Ajtoski, was added. It contains names of the victims and an epitaph: "To freedom fighters who were hanged by the Fascist occupiers in Terazije on 17 August 1941", signed by "citizens of Belgrade". The plaque got damaged in time and was removed in 2008, during the reconstruction of Terazije, for restoration. It was returned on 28 May 2011.

Terazije, as the central city square, was also used as the hanging location by the previous occupiers, too. During World War I, the Austrians hanged at Terazije citizens who didn't obey the curfew. However, this resulted in incidents, where drunk Austrian soldiers would pull or drag the bodies of the hanged ones, so the bodies and the gallows were removed. Also, the neutral countries protested because of these public hangings, so in the end the Austrians moved dead bodies to the Belgrade New Cemetery. Due to the history of this type of executions, the phrase "hanging at Terazije" entered the Serbian language. It can be variously used in different context: as a threat, offering self-sacrifice or protesting one's innocence.

The square and the Palace Albania were hit during the heavy "Easter bombing" of Belgrade by the Allies on 16 April 1944. The palace was fiercely defended by the Germans during the 1944 Belgrade Offensive against the Red Army and Yugoslav Partisan forces. In the evening of 19 October 1944, a Partisan soldier Mladen Petrović placed the Yugoslav flag with red star on the top of the building. Taking over the building opened the way for the Partisan army to the Belgrade Fortress, and allowed the charge which liberated the wider area surrounding the Belgrade Main railway station, so just one day later the entire Belgrade was liberated.

=== After 1945 ===
Modern appearance of Terazije is mostly set after 1947. City's main urbanist, Nikola Dobrović, in order to adapt the square for the May 1st military parade, demolished almost everything on the ground level, including all of the flower beds and the other urban ornaments, so as the fountain. The wooden cobbles were removed and two separate traffic lanes were molded into connected carriageways and the adjoining Nušićeva Street was closed for traffic from the Terazije direction. After 1948 the main square in Belgrade was narrowed, double tram tracks from both sides were removed and a number of modernist buildings were constructed, forming a Square of Marx and Engels (present Square of Nikola Pašić) in the 1950s to the north. Terazije became a "lifeless" ground for the parade and, in the future, for the automobile traffic.

An 8-storey building, later known as the Hempro Building, was constructed by Aleksej Brkić at No. 8 in 1951 and finished in 1956. The black and white façade covering is made of marble, glass and metal, with geometric shapes. It was one of the first public buildings in Belgrade after World War II projected outside of the Socialist realism style, rather being a Modernist edifice. The building also has an imitation of a penthouse with a series of "ribbed bachelor apartments". Brkić had to follow two rules: the building was not to be higher than 8 storeys, which was the height of the neighboring building, and he had to take into consideration that the Terazije Tunnel will be dug beneath it. Deemed "impressive" for its period and a "bald step towards the international architecture", it refreshed the grey urbanity of the socialist city and paved way for the future modernist buildings of the 1950s, like the Hotel Metropol.

In 1950, the sculptural group by Lojze Dolinar, which represented merchant Sima Igumanov, his prematurely died son and youth from South Serbia, popularly known as Sima Igumanov and orphans, was removed from the roof of Igumanov's bequest, the Igumanov's Palace. It wasn't just taken down, but was smashed with hammers by the members of the League of Communist Youth of Yugoslavia. This made a way for the first neon commercial signage in 1958. A mobile advertisement for the Zagreb's Chromos Corporation, it was the first neon commercial sign in Belgrade. In February 2020, deputy mayor Goran Vеsić said that the 3.5 m (11 ft) tall sculptural composition is being recreated by the sculptor Zoran Kuzmanović. Some 60% of the original Dolinar's sculpture survived and Kuzmanović used it for reconstruction. Originally placed on the roof in January 1939 and demolished in 1950, the restored sculpture was returned to its place on 22 April 2021.

Pedestrian underground passage, with commercial facilities, was dug under Terazije in 1967, connecting Iguman's Palace with Hotel Moskva. Another underground passage, connecting Hotel Balkan and Palace Albanija, envisioned as an underground shopping mall, was finished in 1968. Terazije Tunnel, for traffic, was opened on 4 December 1970. On 12 December 1975, old Terazije Fountain was relocated from Topčider back to the square, and placed at its present location. On 25 January 2020, the square and the surrounding area of 23 ha (57 acres) was placed under the state protection as the spatial cultural-historical unit.

== Administration ==
Terazije quarter had a population of 6,333 by the 1883 census of population. According to the further censuses, the population of Terazije was 5,273 in 1890, 6,074 in 1895, 6,494 in 1900, 6,260 in 1905, 9,049 in 1910 and 7,038 in 1921.

For a short period after the World War II, when Belgrade was administratively reorganized from districts (raions) into the municipalities in 1952, Terazije had its own municipality with a population of 17,858 in 1953. However, already on 1 January 1957 the municipality was dissolved and divided between the municipalities of Vračar and Stari Grad. Population of the modern local community (mesna zajednica) of Terazije was 5,033 in 1981, 4,373 in 1991 and 3,338 in 2002. Municipality of Stari Grad later abolished local communities.

Borders of the Terazije local community were streets: Dečanska, Nikola Pašić Square, Kneza Miloša, Kraljice Natalije, Sremska, Kolarčeva and Makedonska. That way it encompassed Andrićev Venac, Pioneers Park, Park Aleksandrov, London, Terazije Terrace and part of historical Savamala. Borders of the Terazije protected area are somewhat reduced: Čumićeva, Nušićeva, Dečanska, Nikola Pašić Square, Kneza Miloša, Andrićev Venac, Dobrinjska, Kraljice Natalije, Sremska. Both definitions excluded the most prominent Terazije feature, Palace Albanija.

== Notable buildings ==
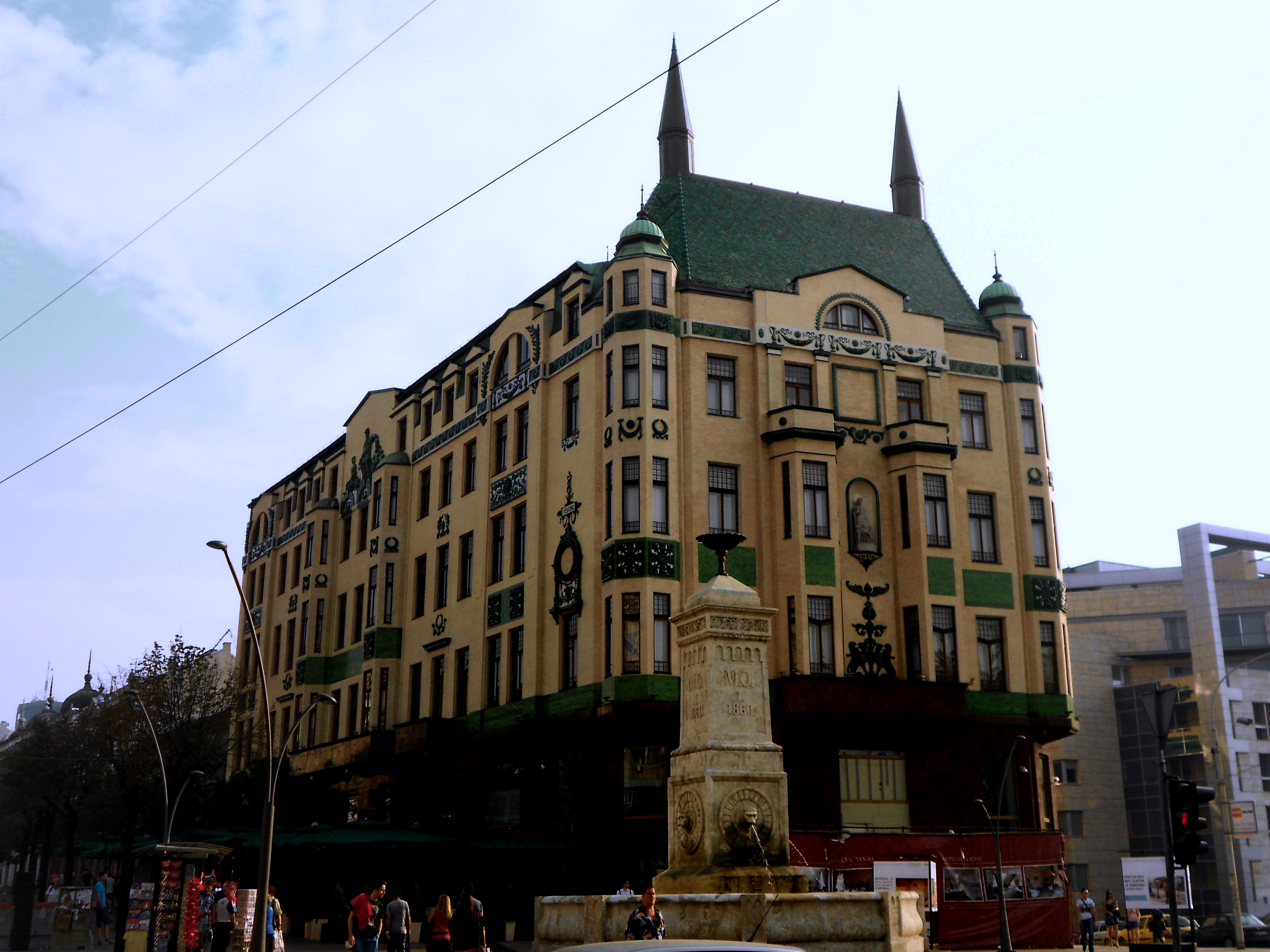
Hotel Moskva

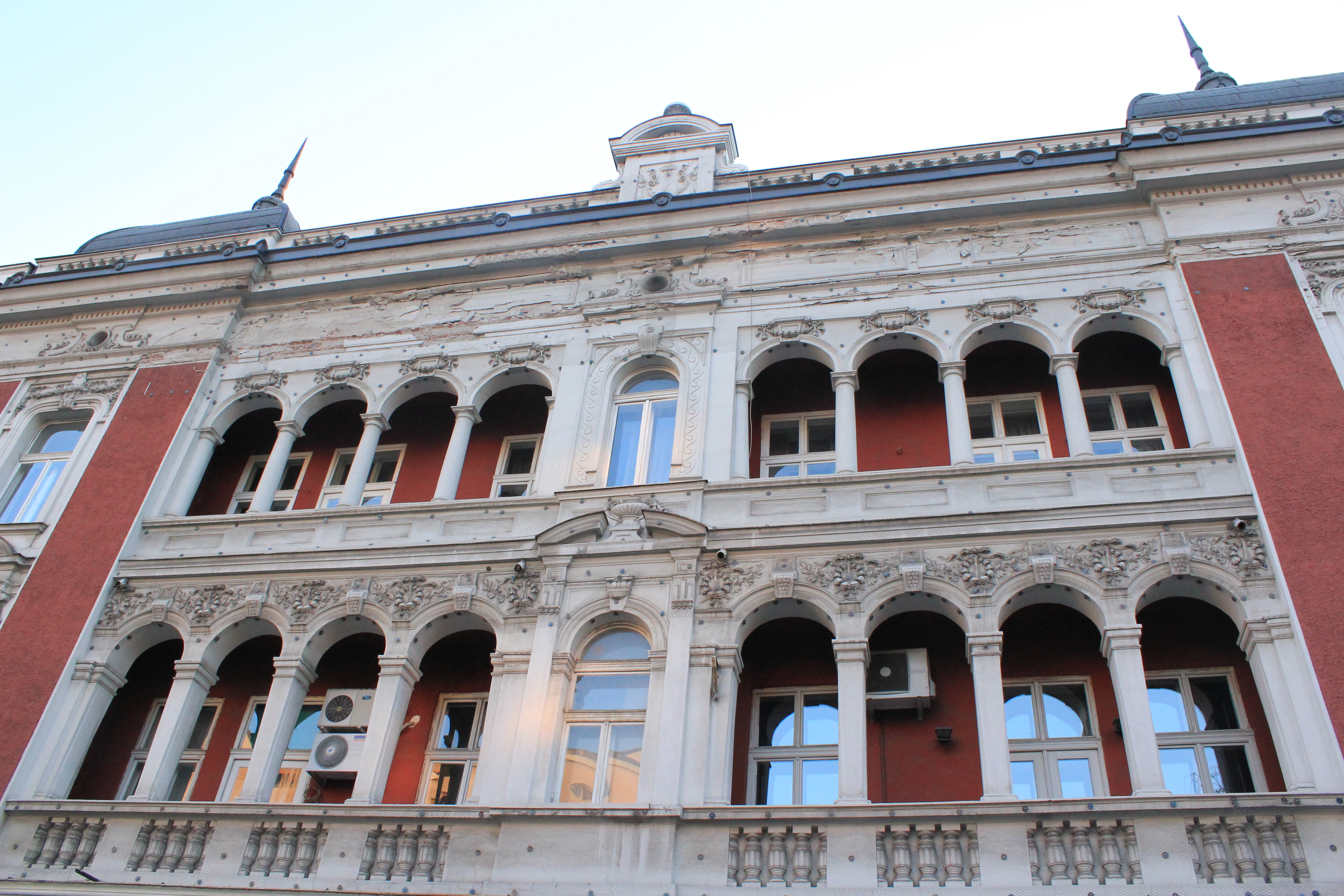
Palace Athens

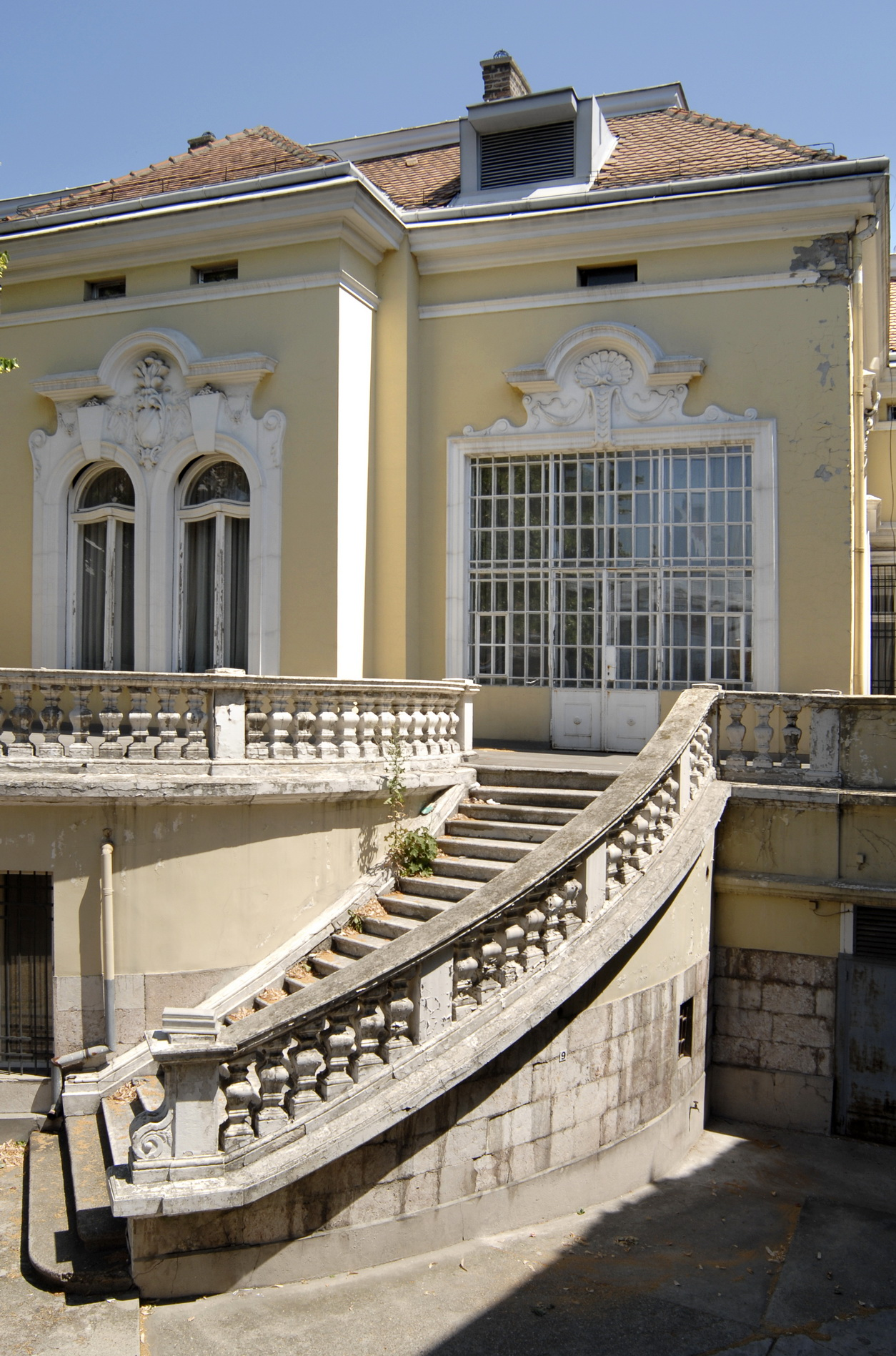
Krsmanović House

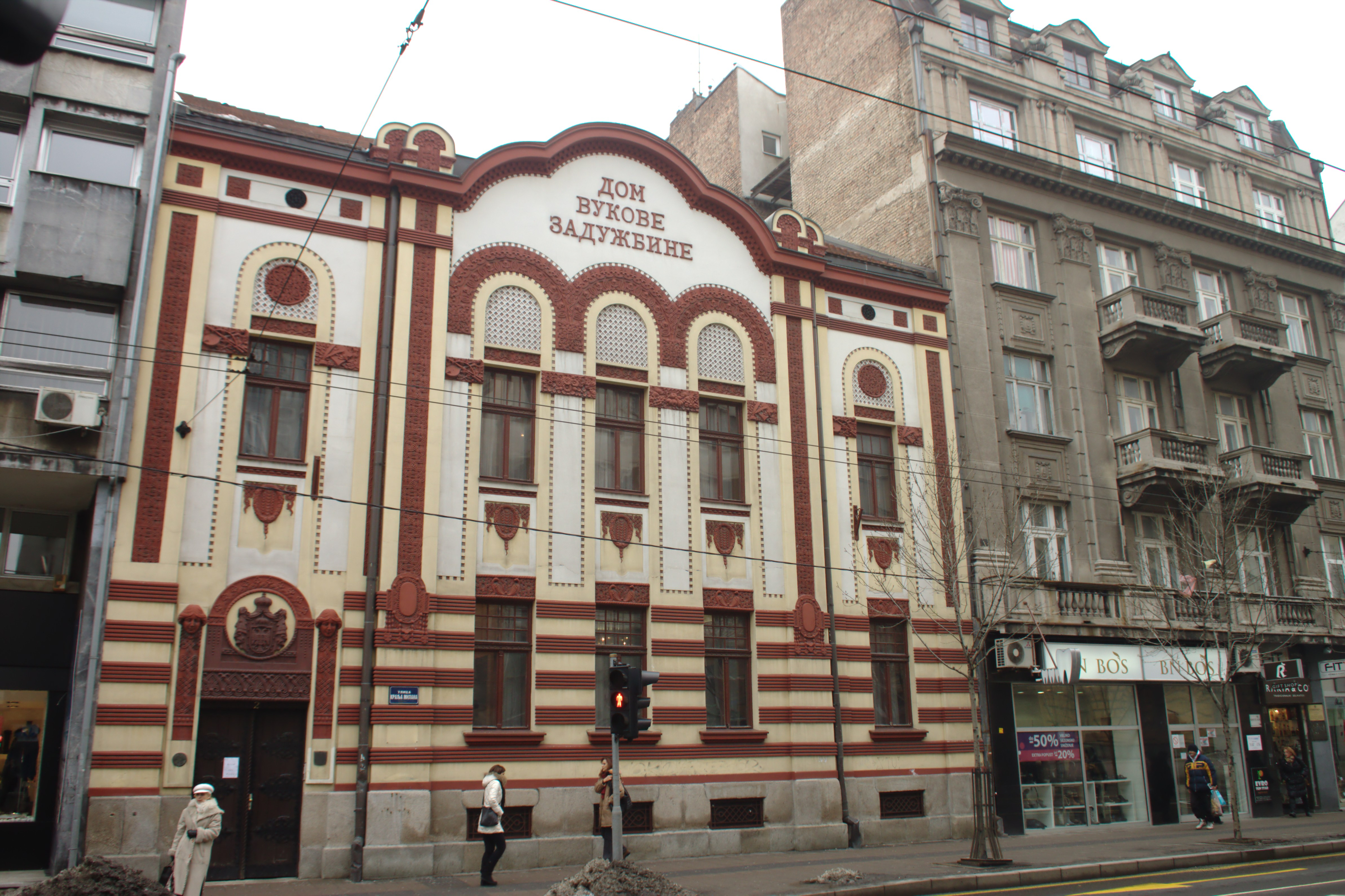
House of Vuk's Foundation

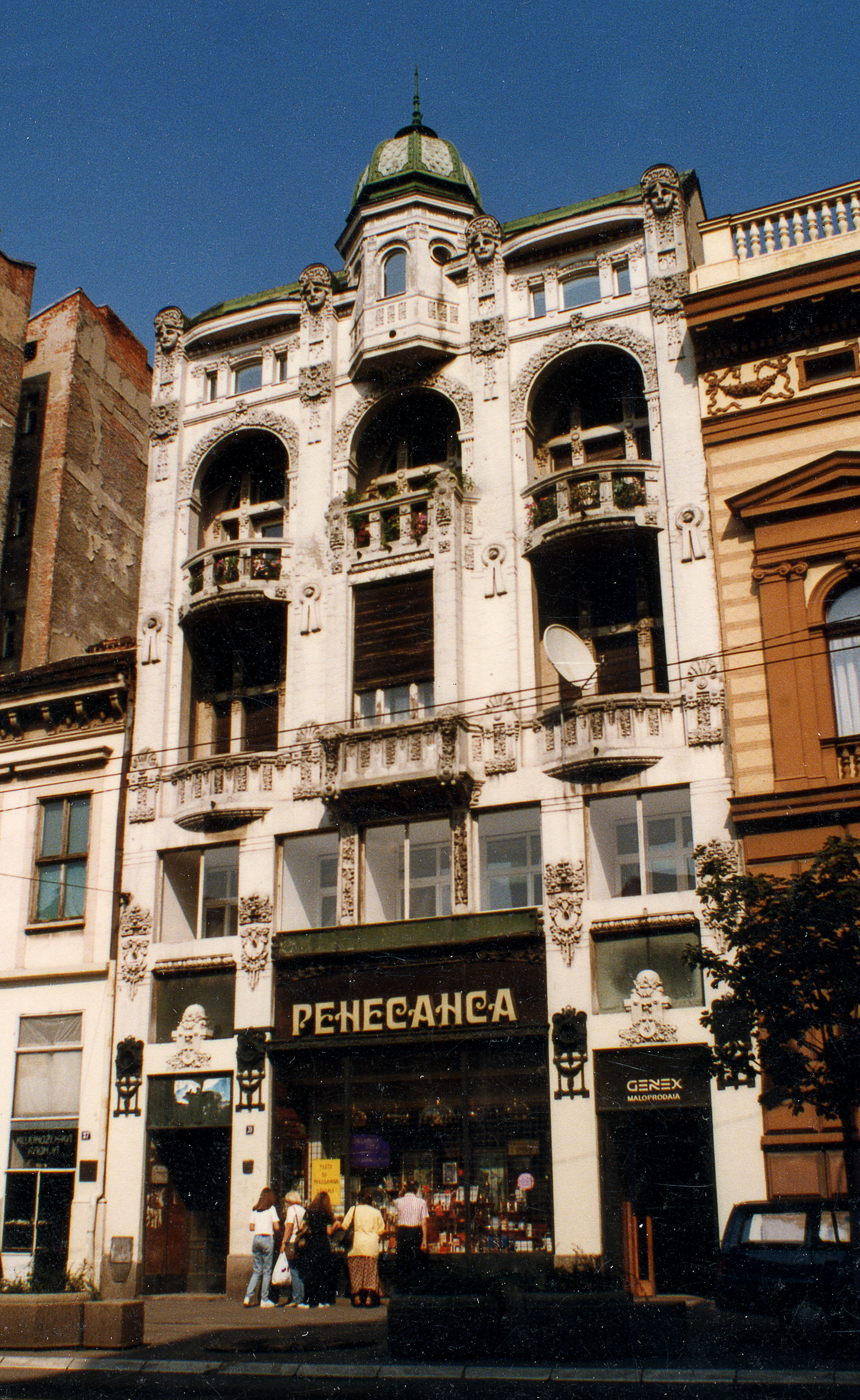
House of Smederevo Bank

As the central and one of the most famous squares in Belgrade, it is the location of many famous Belgrade buildings. The most important hotels, restaurants and shops are or were located here.

=== Former ===
- Hotel Pariz; it was built in 1870 at the spot where Bezistan passage and shopping area is located today. Hotel was demolished during the reconstruction of the square in 1948;
- Kod zlatnog krsta (Serbian for 'By the Golden Cross'); a kafana where the first public cinema show (after the first, private screening in a privately owned house) was held by the Lumière brothers on 6 June [O.S. 25 May] 1896; used to be at the spot where Dušanov grad is located today; it is not clear whether the brothers showed the movies themselves, or it was their representative, Alexandre Promio; Serbian king Aleksandar Obrenović was in the audience. The tickets were pricey and the films were screened for the next six months. After Promio left Belgrade, the next film was shown only 4 years later, in 1900, but those were mobile cinemas.
- Takovo restaurant and cinema; one of the first permanent cinemas in Belgrade, founded in 1909.

=== Present ===
- Palace Atina (1902); residential-commercial building built in 1902 for merchant Đorđe Vučo, after design by Dimitrije T. Leko. The edifice in Venetian Renaissance style has two floors and a loft. It hosted restaurant Atina, which was part of the Hospitality Educational Center in 1956–1958. The restaurant was predated by the kafana "Dva Tigra". Atina's popularity was especially boosted in the 1970s and the 1980s, when it was adapted into the "express restaurant" (hot food bar) and became the first pizzeria in Belgrade.
- Hotel Moskva (1906); still preserving the original shape with its famous façade made of ceramic tiles. Often voted as one of the most beautiful buildings in Belgrade;
- Putnik Building (1914); at the corner of Terazije and Dragosla Jovanovića Street, right across the former royal residence of Stari Dvor. It was built in 1914, after the design of Nikola Nestorović, for the banker Nikola Bošković. The highrise was considered extremely modern for its time. The façade was richly decorated in the Vienna Secession style ornaments, while the specificity includes the corner position, with, also very richly ornamented, narrow alcove. The building was purchased by the tourist company "Putnik" after 1929 and adapted in the 1939–1940 period, when the alcove and all of the façade ornaments were removed, per Đorđe Đorđević's project. Rajko Tatić designed an additional, indented floor, in 1959. In July 2019 a refurbishment of the building began. The reconstruction project, which includes returning of almost all of the original Secessionist façade ornaments, is a work of Zoran Ljubičić. After the reconstruction is finished, the building will become a hotel.
- Hotel Balkan (1935); right across the Hotel Moskva; originally a one-story building built in 1860 on the location of the Simina Kafana, opened by Sima Mehandžija in 1848. It was demolished in 1935 when the present building of the hotel was constructed, work of architect Aleksandar Janković; The old building was also known as the Simina mehana ("Sima's meyhane") and was the gathering point for the volunteers during the Serbian-Turkish wars; Singer Zdravko Čolić recorded a song about the hotel in 2000;
- Hotel Kasina (1935); the old hotel was built around 1860, next to Hotel Pariz. The owner of Kasina was Doka Bogdanović (1860–1914). He allowed for the travelling cinemas to show movies in Kasina in the 1900s and in 1910 Jovanović opened the permanent cinema. In 1913 he founded the "Factory for the making of the cinematography films" and purchased the technology for filming movies. He hired Russian photographer Samson Chernov who filmed photo journals from the Second Balkan War which Jovanović showed in Kasina under the title "First Serbian program". When the World War I broke out, Jovanović and Chernov were filming new movies for the cinema in September 1914 on the Syrmian front, when Jovanović fell off the horse, dying after a while from the aftermaths of the fall. The plays of the National Theatre in Belgrade have been performed here until 1920. The present Hotel Kasina was built at the same place in 1922. Due to the unrepresentative building of the Serbian assembly, and its bad conditions, the deputies occasionally held parliamentary sessions in the "Kasina" instead. This continued after the creation of the Kingdom of the Serbs, Croats and Slovenes in 1918, until the new assembly building was finished in 1936;
- Palace Albania (1940), built in 1937, the first high rise in Belgrade and the highest building in the Balkans before World War II;
- Theatre on Terazije, in the building of the Retirement Fund of the National Bank of the Kingdom of Yugoslavia (1941); It is a Serbian equivalent to Broadway staging numerous musical productions and adaptations from around the world. The theatre is one of the most modern in Belgrade being reconstructed in 2005;

== Other features ==
=== Bezistan ===
Bezistan is a shopping area in an indoor passage that connects Terazije and the Square of Nikola Pašić. Originally, it was a location of Hotel "Pariz", which was built in 1870 and demolished in 1948 during the reconstruction of Terazije. Passage has been protected by the state as a "cultural property", though still under the "preliminary protection", and was nicknamed by the architects as the "belly button of Belgrade". It is part of the wider protected Spatial Cultural-Historical Unit of Stari Grad.

Since the 1950s, the covered square was a quiet corner in sole downtown, with mini gardens and coffee shops and a popular destination of many Belgraders, but in the recent decades mainly lost that function. In 1959 a round plateau with the fountain and a bronze sculpture, called "Girl with the seashell", sculptured by Aleksandar Zarin, was built. A webbed roof, shaped like a semi-opened dome, made of concrete and projected by Vladeta Maksimović, was constructed to cover the plateau and the fountain. Because of that feature, and a small shops located in it, it was named "Bezistan", though it never functioned as the bezistan in its true, oriental sense of the term. Revitalization and reconstruction was projected for the second half of 2008, but the only work that has been done was the reconstruction of the plateau and the fountain in 2011.

A popular disco club "Bezistan" was opened in the 1980s. It was located in the basement of the venue which was later adapted into the McDonald restaurant. It was different from other discos of the era, and was the only "dancing club" in the city. When the popularity of the Italo disco reached Belgrade, the club organized dance competitions for participants from the entire Yugoslavia. Band Zana was promoted for the first time here, while band Aska practiced its choreography for their performance at the 1982 Eurovision song contest. The venue was closed in 1989.

Bezistan covers an area of 13,667 m^{2} (147,110 sq ft). The major feature within Bezistan was the "Kozara" cinema, one of the most popular in Belgrade for decades. It was closed in 2003, purchased by Croatian tycoon Ivica Todorić and allegedly planned as a supermarket for Todorić's Serbian brand "Idea" before it was destroyed by fire on 25 May 2012 It has been left in that condition ever since. Bezistan had candy and souvenir shops on one side, and modernistic section on other side, with McDonald's restaurant, modern coffee shop and "Reiffeisen bank", but as of 2018 it looks like nothing more than a neglected, empty passage. New possible reconstruction was announced in April 2017, followed by a series of postponing: for October 2017, January, March and May 2018. The project included new paving of the area and reintroduction of the greenery. Nothing has been done, though, and in May 2019 part of the concrete ceiling collapsed so the city again promised to renovate the passage, sometime in 2019. After the reports of further deterioration of the ceiling in January 2021, city announced that Bezistan will not be renovated in 2021 either, even though it became part of the Terazije protected area in January 2020.

=== Čumić Alley ===
In the early 20th century, a section behind the main square became a hub of commercial and craft shops. After the owner of the lot, quite big for the central urban zone of the city, Živko Kuzmanović, the area became known as the Kuzmanović Alley, or Kuzmanović Yard. Initially, quite a successful business area, by the 1930s the shops went bankrupt and were closed. The alley was transformed into an informal settlement. In the reprint of its article from 13 March 1937, daily Politika writes about the city's decision to tear down the Kuzmanović Yard: It seems that another disgrace will disappear from Belgrade, but much larger and more dangerous for the health and lives of the people than that eyesore that "Albania" was. A row of shacks and hovels in "Kuzmanović yard", which altogether cover an area of 4.000 m2 between the streets of Dečanska, Pašićeva nad Kolarčeva, will disappear. Belgrade municipality sent its commission yesterday to check the condition of the "Kuzmanović yard". The commission established that the shanties and burrows are prone to collapse any minute and that it will advocate for them to be demolished, in the interest of health and lives of the tenants. The shantytown was demolished by 1940. The alley was later renamed Čumićevo Sokače ("Čumić Alley") after a politician Aćim Čumić, former mayor of Belgrade and prime minister of Serbia.

In 1989, the first modern shopping mall (concurrently with the Staklenac on the Republic Square) in Belgrade was opened in Čumić Alley, colloquially shortened only to Čumić. It soon became one of the elite shopping locations in Belgrade, with numerous cafés, galleries and clubs in addition. It is also the shortest passage between the squares of the Republic and of Nikola Pašić. The entire alley complex, designed by architect Milutin Gec, was finished in 1991. By the late 1990s, when other shopping malls started to open around the city, the decline of Čumić began. By 2010, the district was almost completely abandoned, becoming a ghost town. Then a group of young designers moved into the empty shops and began selling their homemade crafts, forming a Belgrade Design District with over 100 shops. In 2018 city administration stepped in with plans of creating a full artistic quart in the future. The deadline is set for 2020.

The shopping mall was built without proper permits as the city urban plans envisioned public garage on that location, so there was always a possibility for the city to demolish it and go with its plan. In May 2020 city reiterated that it will not demolish it, but due to the ownership issues, lack of paperwork, plans and designs, and COVID-19 pandemic, the reconstruction was moved for 2021. Nothing has been done by August 2022, when the reconstruction of the upper section of the Nušićeva Street was announced, which should include the access section of the Čumić Alley.

=== Sremska ===
Sremska is a short, curved street which connects the section where the Knez Mihailova and Terazije meet and the Maršala Birjuzova street, making a pedestrian connection between Terazije and Zeleni Venac, and, further down the Maršala Birjuzova, with Varoš Kapija. Sremska is known for the shopping mall on its right side. On the left side, the tall building of Agrobanka was built from 1989 to 1994, and as a part of the project, a barren concrete plateau was built right above the Terazije tunnel. Since the 1990s it was used as a location for the small flea market. In 2005 the market was removed and from December 2010 to April 2011 the concrete slab was turned into a mini-square (piazzetta) with small, mobile park, in the form of the roof garden. The urban pocket has lawns, flowers and evergreen shrubs. It is also Belgrade's first public location in the past 100 years that had a mosaic done on the floor. Materials used include the porous concrete, movable metal construction on which the grass turfs are planted and the drip irrigation system was installed. With Terazije, it is part of the "Stari Beograd" ("Old Belgrade") cultural unit, which is under protection. In time, due to the poor maintenance, by 2019 the piazetta deteriorated again.

The inclined street is 165 metres (541 ft) long, and covers an area of 3,200 square metres (34,000 sq ft). In the first half of 2019 the reconstruction of the street was announced. Reconstruction began in June 2022. The street will be adapted into the extension of the Knez Mihailova's pedestrian zone. The asphalt concrete will be replaced with granite slabs, with added benches, candelabra, pergolas and jardinieres.

=== Terazije Fountain ===
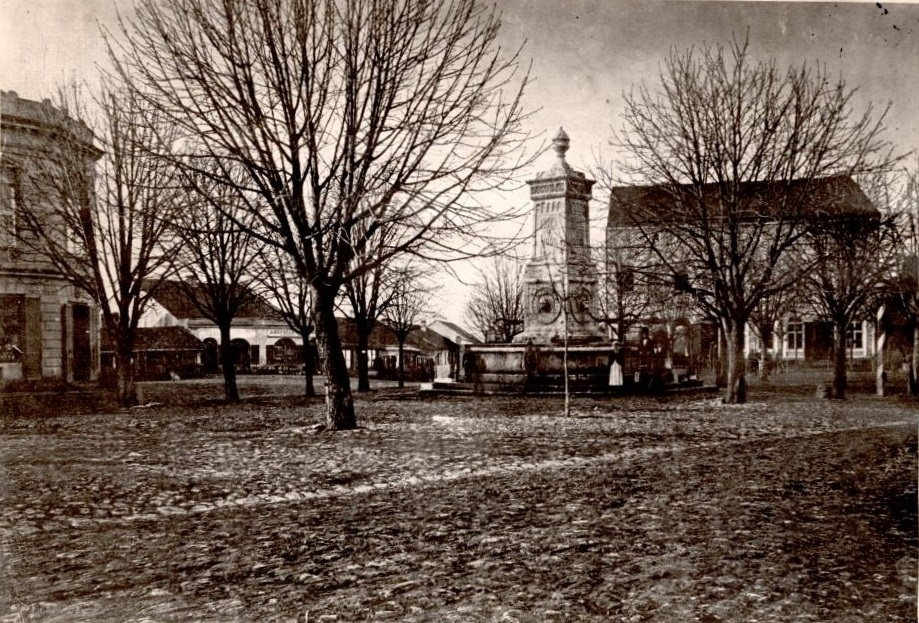
Drinking fountain in 1876

Colloquially, the term applies to any of the three historical fountains in Terazije: a drinking fountain (1860–1911 & 1976–), a waterworks fountain (1892–1912) and a decorative fountain (1927–1947).

Terazije drinking fountain (Serbian: Теразијска чесма, Terazijska česma);

The fountain replaced the old Turkish water tower, which had only one water pipe. It was envisioned by the first regulatory plan developed for Terazije in 1843. The plan for the fountain was presented to the State Council on 13 March 1846. General design included the monument-like, four-sided fountain with water pipes and troughs on two opposite side, with stone benches on two other sides. The monument would be 9.5 m (31 ft) tall and the entire complex would be made of dressed stone. From start, the fountain would be connected to the city waterworks. On 16 March, the Council accepted the proposal and allocated 2,570 silver forints. The project wasn't executed.

Italian sculptor from Novara, Giuseppe Cassano, drafted the new, detailed plan for the fountain. Still, the plan followed all general stipulations from the 1846 design. He presented it on 26 May 1855, but this plan also remained only on paper. By July 1859, the public and the press openly objected to the shape of the existing Turkish water tower, as being worn out by the time and having just one pipe which is not nearly enough for the needs of this part of the city. The fountain was disparaging the neighborhood, especially regarding its location in the burgeoning business area and new commercial hub of Belgrade as Terazije was described as one of the most beautiful Belgrade cities by this time. As the area around it also was not properly arranged, there were constant crowds and quarrels. This was regular for other fountains in Belgrade at the time, too, and some skirmishes ended up having major political impact, like the 1862 Čukur Fountain incident.

In the end, the fountain was built to celebrate the return of Prince Miloš Obrenović to Serbia and his second rule, though the historians can't agree whether he supplied the funds for its construction, as often reported. Foundation stone was laid and consecrated on 30 July [O.S. 18 July] 1860, though it is often erroneously reported as 1859. The old water tower was removed. The fountain provided 524 g/s (1,110 oz/min) of water on all four pipes. The fountain had appearance it preserved until today. It has carved "MO", the initials of Miloš Obrenović, and "1860", the year of its completion. Italian stone cutter Francesco Franco Lorano sculptured it.

The fountain is made of light Tašmajdan limestone. It consists of more than 8 m (26 ft) tall squared, four-sided column, shaped like a truncated obelisk with three sections. In the middle section, on all four sides, there are carved, round ornamental medallions, with embossed lion heads and water pipes. Above, there are initials of prince Miloš on each side (M.O. I) and year 1860. On the western side there is a monogram of sculptor Lorano. The obelisk stands in the octagon-shaped pool, with 10 m (33 ft) in diameter. It was in typical Romanticism style popular in Belgrade in the 1850s and the 1860s.

The water was at first conducted via clay pipes from Bulbuder. Originally, the water pool was elevated and not easily accessible, so the water was grabbed with buckets, but later longer pipes were built to conduct water to the edge of the pool. When the fountain was finished, chestnut trees were planted around it. After the 1862 incident at Čukur fountain, the Great Market was relocated to Terazije for a while, and the fountain's pool was used for keeping live fish.

When the new, modern Belgrade waterworks system was inaugurated, Metropolitan of Belgrade Mihailo Jovanović consecrated it on the fountain on 11 July [O.S. 29 June] 1892, the Feast of Saints Peter and Paul. During the reconstruction of Terazije, the fountain was planned for relocation in March 1911. City administration decided so, because they were sure it will damage the planned, future appearance of Terazije. It was originally to be moved, with "the full piety", either to the spring of Hajdučka Česma in Košutnjak, or somewhere within the city limits, at some respected location. It was to be relocated in its entirety and to be transformed into the "flower vase".

In the end, it was moved to Topčider in 1912. It was situated in the churchyard of the Topčider Church. Question remains whether the relocation was indeed influenced by the urbanism or rather by the political reasons as the ruling dynasties switched from the Obrenović to the Karađorđević in 1903. Relocation helped the preservation of the fountain. Terazije were heavily bombed and damaged in both World wars, including its major landmarks like Palace Albania and Hotel Moskva, but the fountain in the park, on the outskirts of the city, survived unharmed. The fountain was declared a cultural monument in 1965 as one of the first and most important monuments in Belgrade. While in Topčider, the fountain was only a monument, as it wasn't connected to the waterworks.

During the Communist period, it was decided to return the fountain to Terazije. With the participation of structural geologist Milorad Dimitrijević, the relocation was conducted on 12 December 1975. Nothing was changed on the object itself, so it preserved its original 1860 appearance. The location is not the same, though. It was moved a bit closer to the Hotel Moskva than it used to be, because of the underground passage dug under Terazije in 1967. Restoration works were conducted in 2002–2003.

Terazije (waterworks) fountain;

The fountain was opened in 1892, when the first Belgrade waterworks was ceremonially opened in Terazije. It was located on the opposing side of Terazije from the drinking fountain, and situated on the pedestrian pathway in front of the Kasina and Pariz hotels. The water jet was 4 m (13 ft) tall. It was demolished during the major Terazije reconstruction in 1911–1912. With few surviving photographs which depict it, the fountain disappeared from the collective memory and is completely forgotten today.

Terazije fountain (Serbian: Теразијска фонтана, Terazijska fontana);

The first proper, decorative fountain (fontana) in Belgrade, as previously only drinking fountains (česma) were built.

A plan for the rearrangement of Terazije in the summer of 1911, among numerous other changes, included the construction of a new fountain. Among many rundelas (round flower beds), on the side towards today's passage to the Nušićeva street one rundela was used as the base for the postament of the monument "Victory Herald", a work of Ivan Meštrović. Meštrović's statue was finished in 1913, immediately after and as a continuation, in concept and style, of the cycle of sculptures intended for his large-scale project for a shrine commemorating the Battle of Kosovo ("Temple of Vidovdan"), which includes representative sculptures such as Miloš Obilić and Marko Kraljević. Conceived as a colossal athletic male nude set up on a tall column, the monument symbolically represents the iconic figure of victory. In iconographic terms, the personification of the triumph of a victorious nation can be traced back to classical antiquity and its mythic hero Hercules. The outbreak of World War I and the reconstruction of a massively demolished Belgrade delayed the dedication but the idea was revived in the 1920s. However, some puritan and female organizations protested heavily against posting a 5 m (16 ft) tall figure of a fully naked man in downtown. It was then opted to erect the monument in the Kalemegdan Park in the Belgrade Fortress. Becoming known as Pobednik (The Victor), the statue is today a symbol and one of the most recognized landmarks of Belgrade.

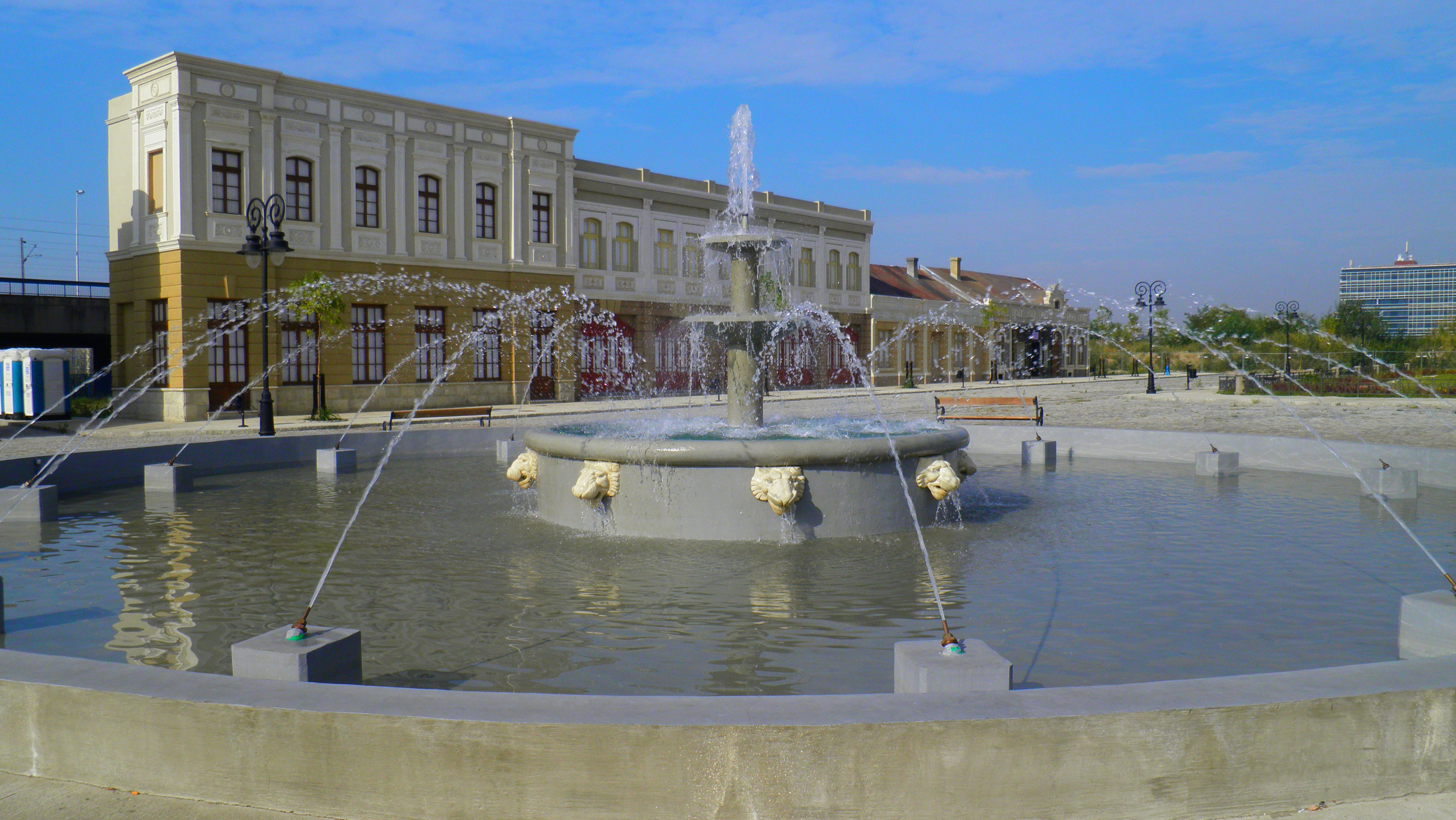
Replica of the former fountain (1927-47). The replica itself was demolished in 2015

The rundela designated as the base of the monument remained empty. Due to the impending marriage of the King Alexander I Karađorđević and Romanian princess Maria, city architect Momir Korunović was given a task of making something out of it, worthy of the royal wedding which was set for 8 June 1922. The rundela was turned into the several steps elevated podium, with a stone border which was ornamented with the lion heads from the outside and pigeons from the inside. Due to the lack of time and funds, the animal ornaments were made of papier-mâché, like a theatrical scenography. After the wedding, the cardboard ornaments survived until the fall of 1922 and were disintegrated by the rains. The rundela again remained empty for several years.

In 1927 city administration decided to adapt it into a fountain. It was ceremonially open on 2 April 1927. During winters, in order to prevent frost damage, the entire fountain was covered with hay, earth and grass on top. It was a constant source of making fun of the city government, which was being accused by the journalists for creating a midden in downtown instead of progressing to the future. The fountain itself though, was considered a beauty: it was made of greenish granite, had sprinklers of different intensity while the bed of the pond was made from Murano glass. In 1947, Dobrović demolished almost everything to the ground level, including the fountain His explanation for the destruction was that the fountain "choked" the traffic.

When the original plans were made, the municipality purchased the marble in 1911 which was to be used not only for the fountain, but for the entire reconstruction the square. When Belgrade was conquered by the German army during World War I, in October 1915, German commander, Generalfeldmarschall August von Mackensen, order for the dead soldiers to be buried on the hill above Banovo Brdo, where an extension of Košutnjak forest is today. He also ordered for three monuments to be built (two for German and one for Serbian soldiers), and the marble for Terazije was used. Same marble was used in 1916 when German emperor Wilhelm II arrived in Belgrade for the large stone bench, built for him by the German soldiers next to the cemetery. Though in various states of bad shape, all four object made from Terazije marble still survive in the 21st century.

=== Terazije Terrace ===
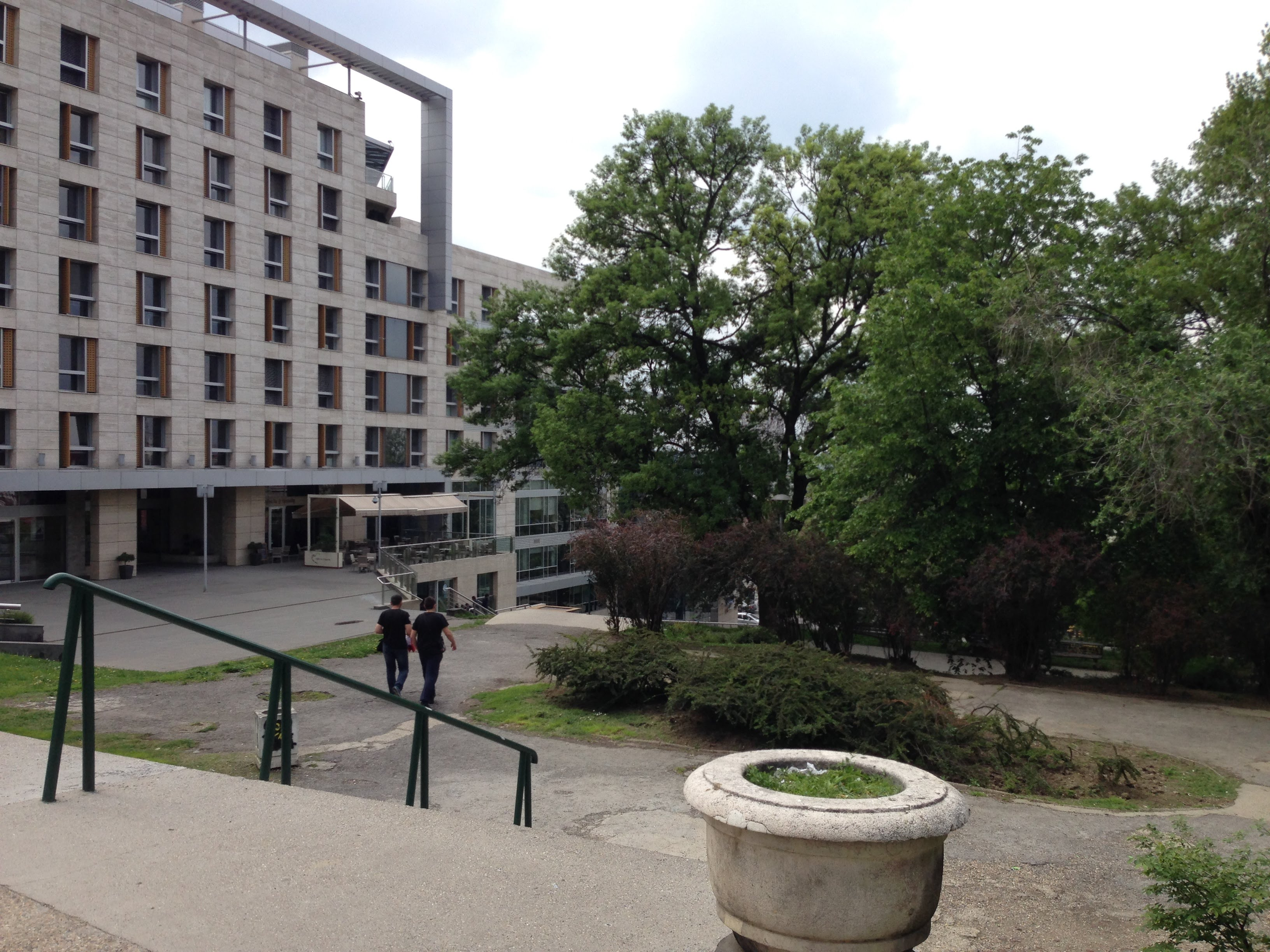
Upper section of the terrace, across the Hotel Moskva

Terazije Terrace (Serbian: Теразијска тераса, romanized: Terazijska Terasa) is a sloping park coming down from the 117 m (384 ft) high Terazije Ridge (on top of which Terazije is built) to the right bank of the Sava river, but more specifically coming down to the Zeleni Venac market. It covers area of 1.37 hectares (3.4 acres). Geographically, it is a part of the larger, 300 m (980 ft) long Sava Ridge.

The top of the area is an excellent natural lookout point to the Sava river valley, Novi Beograd and further into the Syrmia region. The future of the terrace is a subject of public and academic debate ever since the 19th century. The urban arrangement of the area "behind the Prince Miloš fountain" was tackled for the first time in 1867, by the city's first urbanist Emilijan Josimović. Architect Andra Stevanović in 1897 suggested the transformation of the area into the scenic viewpoint, which would "open view on the Sava river and the Podrinje mountains". His colleague, Dimitrije T. Leko suggested Terazije Terrace as the location of the new National Assembly of Serbia building. Engineer Jevta Stevanović proposed in 1910 for the Belgrade Municipal Hall to be built here. First general plan for it is from 1912 by the French architect Alban Chamond which envisioned it as the cascades of trapezoid piazzetas with flowers and fountains, leaving the panoramic view intact. Austrian architects Emil Hoppe and Otto Schönthal proposed their solution for the slope in 1919. They envisioned it as an esplanade, surrounded by the new buildings and the monument to Unification. The monumental, grandiose project was rejected for being too expensive.

International design competition for Belgrade's general plan (GP) was announced in 1921 and none of the subjected works, dealing with 58 proposed public buildings, dealt with the terrace, leaving an empty space in downtown. Head of the commission for GP Đorđe Kovaljevski noticed this and in 1922 ordered new plan just for this area. In 1923 a project for constructing a terrace-observation point was made, as the "central city lookout". City began to buy out the lots along the Balkanska and Prizrenska streets and to demolish objects. For the first time, this opened view from Terazije to the Sava. The 1924 GP also tackled the issue of the slope.

In 1929, Serbian architect Nikola Dobrović's plan was accepted. He projected two tall, tower-like business buildings on the both ends of the ridge and a plateau between with several small business and leisure objects, while the slope itself would be a succession of horizontal gardens, pools and fountains. Dobrović envisioned it as part of the closest connection of downtown and the Sava river: Terazije-Terazije Terrace-Kraljice Natalije Street-Karađođreva Street. Due to the Great Depression, in 1930 city decided that the temporary solution will be park on three step levels, until it becomes possible to construct the "future monumental terrace". At that time, only the upper section was adapted as a park, while the lower section was occupied by the houses in the Kraljice Natalije Street and their backyards. In order to hide that "eyesore" from the view of the people in downtown, a front-type wooden wall made of slats was constructed in the 1930s. It was made like a grid, and the ivy was planted in order to grow around it and to obstruct the view on the lower neighborhood. The houses were demolished after World War II, so the park today extends all the way to the Kraljice Natalije Street.

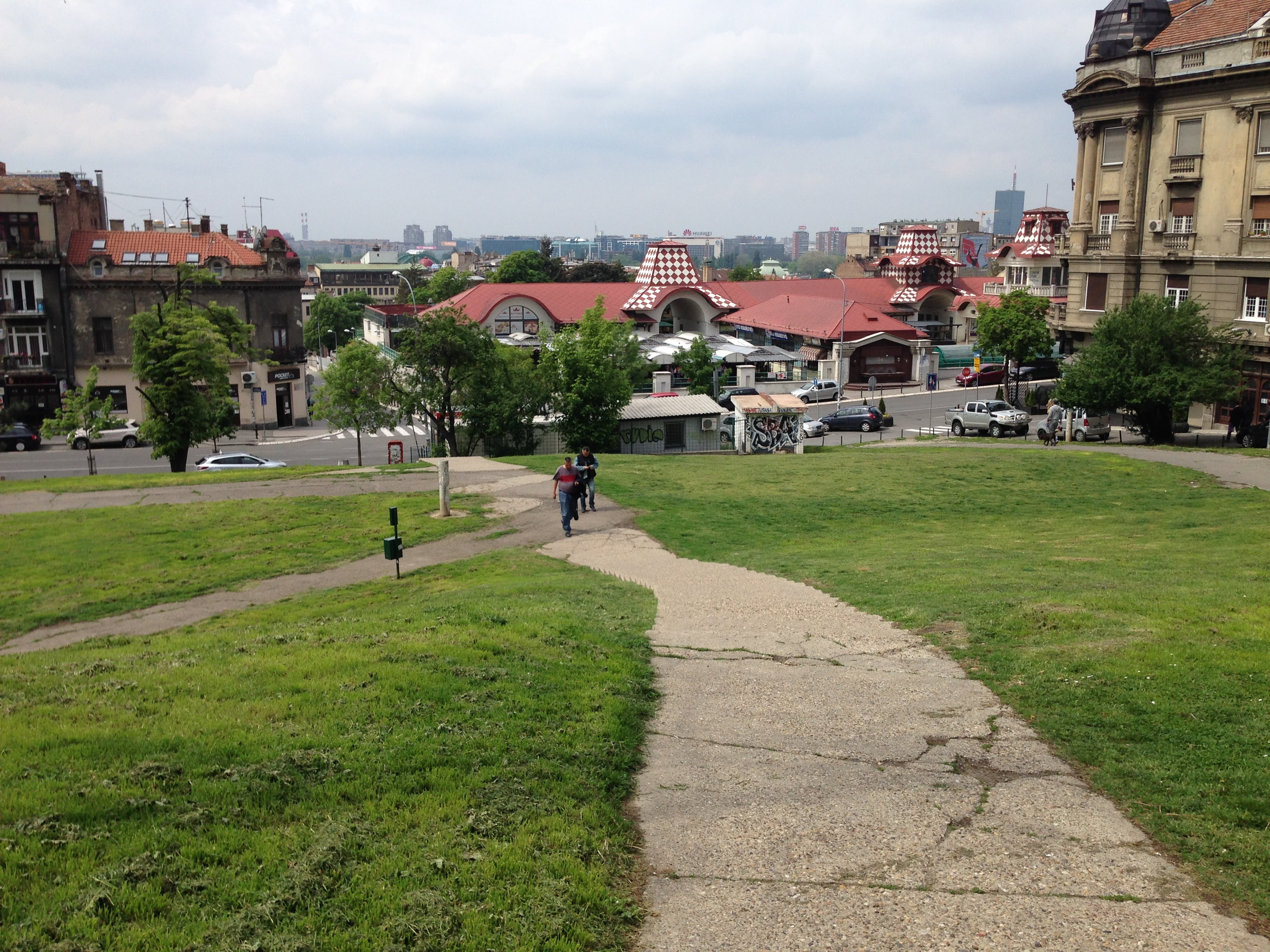
Downhill view, on Zeleni Venac and New Belgrade, across the Sava river

In 1937, Romanian architects won the competition on arrangement of the entire downtown from Theatre Square to Terazije. They envisioned demolition of both the Balkan and the Moskva hotels and formation of the monumental park. However, new city's GP from 1939 retained the project of Dobrović. There was another project, by Stanko Mandić, in 1951. In the 1990s Dobrović's plan was reactivated, but the temporary park remained and a competition from 1991 (won by Slobodan Rajević and Zoran Nikezić) resulted only in the large building at the beginning of the Balkanska street. Bulky residential-business complex, built by the "Mali Kolektiv" company, met with disapproval of the public. General consensus was that the building rather defaced Terazije instead to beautify it. Another competition followed in 1998.

In 2006 a new tender for architectural solution for Terazije Terrace was organized which resulted in 2007 project by Jovan Mitrović and Dejan Miljković, and 2008 project by Branislav Redžić (shared with a different project by Grozdana Šišović and Dejan Milanović), but they all remained only on paper. City architect at the time, Đorđe Bobić, favored the Šišović-Milanović project, which was met with criticism. In 2015, city urbanist Milutin Folić announced plans to reactivate and adapt Redžić's project and asked for the donations of €3 million. After that failed, city claimed it spared enough money in 2016 and announced reconstruction for 2017, but nothing happened. City again announced it will arrange the slope in 2019 but without specifying by which project. In January 2020 city official stated they will combine two designs, the 2008 one by Redžić and the second awarded work from 1998 by Branislav Mitrović and Miljković. A month later, city urbanist Marko Stojčić included the Šišović-Milanović in this group, as this project has now been deemed unjustly pushed aside. Stojčić said that at the new bidding will not be a proper bidding, instead the jury will cherry-pick from each project and adjust it to the modern guidelines (pedestrian zone, more green areas, etc.). He also said that the jury, unlike now, won't be made only of architects, but the clerks from the city administration will be members, too.

Public protested, considering a circus the constant change of projects and prolonged start of the reconstruction. All three invited teams refused to participate in the proposed bidding, so the city decided to return to the 2008 project by Redžić in May 2020, announcing the reconstruction is not ready anyway due to technical problems, moving it for 2021. By this time, urbanists and other architects began to criticize all the projects as wrong, starting with the Dobrović's design and all the other which all followed his basic idea which includes, in different variants, concreting of some 5,000 m^{2} (54,000 sq ft), construction of the pointless monumental stairways under which the "tunnel" will host just another shopping mall. Instead, some proposed ditching of all those projects and construction of a proper, modern park, which would descent down to the Sava bank and help conduct fresh river air directly into the overheated city downtown.

In June 2022, Stojčić stated that he awarded the entire project to Redžić, who will do it in three phases, bordered by the streets: Balkanska-Kraljice Natalije, Kraljice Natalije-Lomina, and Lomina-Gavrila Principa. The park should be on top of the Sava-Danube tunnel. Construction of this tunnel was tentatively scheduled for 2023, when the first phase of the terrace should also start. Phase two should be finished in 2025. The project should have much more greenery than any of the previous designs and the previously planned 8,000 square metres (86,000 sq ft) of constructed area and parking lots, will be cut in half. Idea of making the terrace into the scenic viewpoint again, with or without other phases of reconstruction, was discarded by architect and member of the Serbian Academy of Sciences and Arts Milan Lojanica, who stated that "(this idea) is completely disavowed in our time by the gigantic structures in Belgrade Waterfront, erected right between the terrace and the Sava.

=== Terazije Tunnel ===
Terazije Tunnel (Serbian: Теразијски тунел, romanized: Terazijski tunel) is a traffic tunnel which passes right beneath Terazije in the east–west direction. The eastern entry point is at the intersection of the Dečanska and Nušićeva streets, while the western is the extension of the Brankova street. It is a direct and the closest link between downtown Belgrade and the Branko's Bridge and further to the New Belgrade and Zemun. In one of his projects, architect Dimitrije T. Leko envisioned the tunnel in 1955. In 1957-60 a building was constructed by Zagorka Mešulam which is located at the future entry point from the Nušićeva street. An elevated empty space in the base of the building was built to keep and area for the future descent into the tunnel. The space was hidden behind the wall before the tunnel was built. The tunnel was projected by the Ljubomir Porfirović and Milosav Vidaković and was officially opened on 4 December 1970 by the President of Yugoslavia Josip Broz Tito and the first lady Jovanka Broz. It was part of the four major official openings on the same day, which also included the Mostar interchange, the highway through Belgrade and the Gazela bridge. Today Terazije tunnel is known as one of the busiest traffic routes in Belgrade and even a short stoppage in it causes widespread traffic jams all over the downtown. On the same day, the pedestrian underground passage in Nušićeva street, at the entrance into the tunnel, was also opened. First 24/7 supermarket in Belgrade, (in Serbian: dragstor), was opened in the passage. Since then, it deteriorated quite a bit, with only few shops working, despite a partial reconstruction in 2009.

During the planning, it was envisioned that two old buildings at the Zeleni Venac entrance will be demolished. One is located at the corner of the Prizrenska and Sremska, and another at the corner of the Sremska and Maršala Birjuzova. The latter had a distinction of surviving World War II, though damaged, even though the surrounding area was so badly ruined that it had to be leveled to the ground after the war. Post-war urbanists planned to demolish it, too, but it survived. In the end, one wing of the building in the Prizrenska had to be demolished, while the building in the Maršala Birjuzova survived again. Earning a moniker of "tunnel sentinel", its façade was fully renovated in 2019.

Already in the 1970s it was evident that the tunnel is not adequate for the amount of traffic. A "twin tunnel" for the traffic from the opposite direction was planned. It was to connect the Bulevar kralja Aleksandra and the Branko's Bridge. According to the proposed plans, the traffic would descend underground between the bridge and the Republic Square. In time, several other routes were proposed, like the Branko's Bridge-Bulevar Despota Stefana (Palilula neighborhood), from the Pop Lukina Street at the bridge to the First school of economics at the corner of the Cetinjska and Bulevar Despota Stefana streets. Ultimately, the tunnel wasn't built. In the 2010s the idea of a tunnel resurfaced, but though the exit point at Palilula remained in the new plans, the entry point was moved to the west, near the Old Sava Bridge area.

== See also ==
- Hotel Moskva (Belgrade)
- Palace Albania
