= London, Belgrade =

Neighbourhood of Stari Grad in Serbia

London Лондон
- Urban neighbourhood
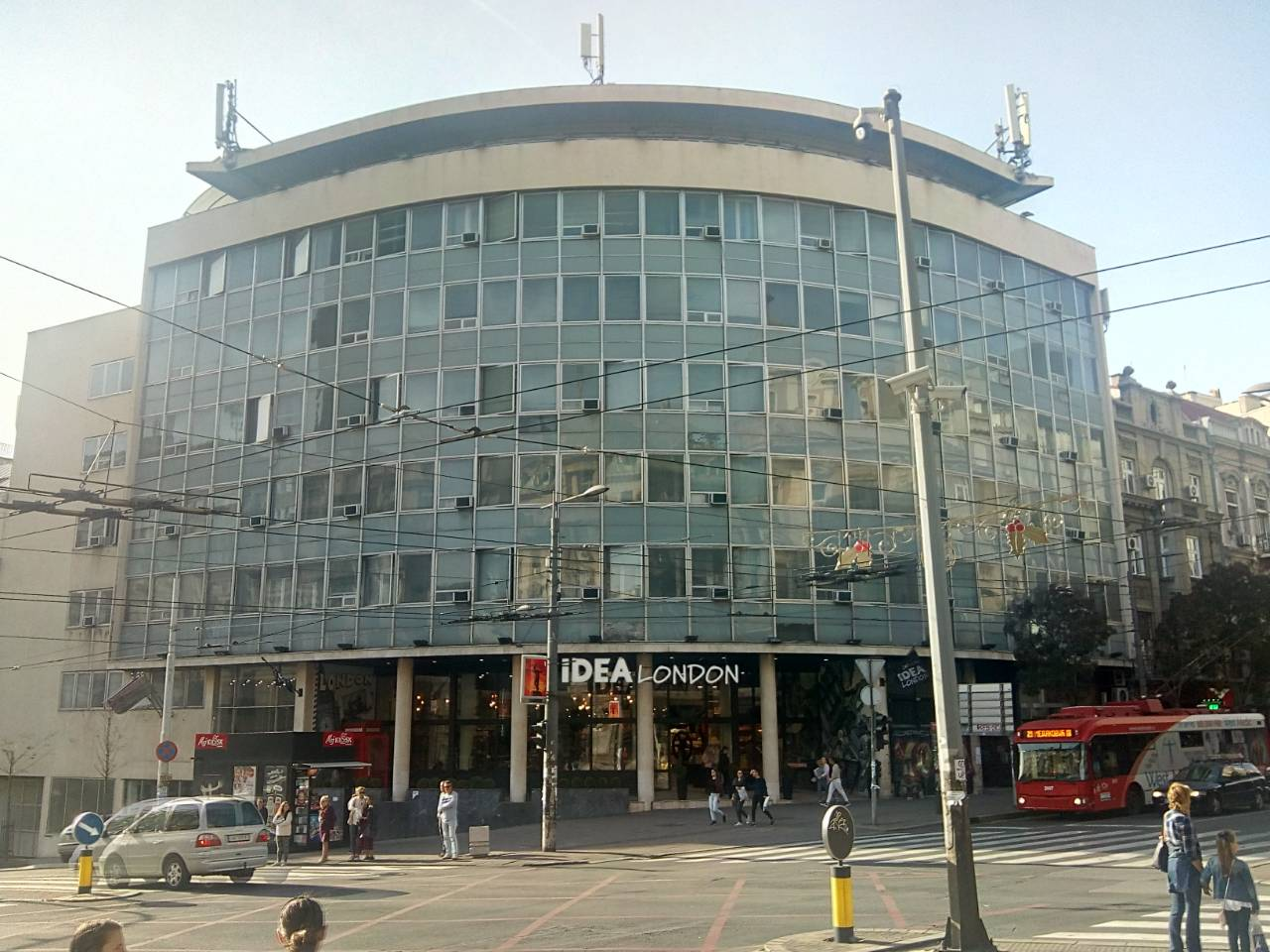
- The London building, October 2018

- Location within Belgrade
- Coordinates: 44.808495°N 20.463161°E
- Country: Serbia
- Region: Belgrade
- Municipality: Stari Grad
- Time zone: UTC+1 (CET)
  - Summer (DST): UTC+2 (CEST)
- Area code: +381(0)11
- Car plates: BG

London (Serbian Cyrillic: Лондон) is an urban neighborhood of Belgrade, the capital of Serbia. It is located in Belgrade's municipality of Stari Grad, in the city's downtown.

== Location ==
London is located around the crossroads of two central streets of Belgrade, Kralja Milana and Kneza Miloša street, just 500 m (1,600 ft) south of Terazije, central Belgrade, between Terazije and Cvetni Trg. North of it is Andrićev Venac, short, artistic promenade (with artificial stream) dedicated to the novelist and Nobel Prize laureate Ivo Andrić and the surrounding neighborhood which encompasses Novi Dvor, seat of the President of Serbia and one of the main pharmacies in Belgrade,1 Maj. Along the Kralja Milana Street is also a Park Aleksandrov on the north and Beograđanka, the tallest building in downtown Belgrade, on the south.

== History ==
=== 19th century ===
The building of the new hotel was constructed at the crossroad in 1873. As the hotel was named "London", after the capital of the United Kingdom, soon the entire surrounding area became known as London, too. As the National Assembly of Serbia at that time was located one block away, at the crossroad of the Kraljice Natalije and Kneza Miloša streets, the main guest were the deputies during the parliamentary recesses. It was a humble, low and unrepresentative edifice, so sometimes the deputies held sessions in the "Kasina" hotel on the Terazije square.

In this period, London was the eastern border of urban Belgrade. The commercial zone, with grocery stores (čaršija), spread from Terazije to London, while from this point on, the gardens and fields extended to the east until the marshy pond where the Slavija Square is today, where local population went for duck hunting.

Across the London building, in the Masarikova Street, is the headquarters of the Belgrade electric company. The dispatch center was built from 1962 to 1968. The building is located on the very spot where the first electric light in Belgrade was lit in 1882. At that time it was the "Proleće" kafana, later renamed to "Hamburg".

After her divorce from King Milan, and his abdication in 1889, Queen Natalie lived in the neighborhood, close to the present location of Beograđanka. Trying to remove Milan's pro-Austrian influence on his son, the young king Alexander, the government of Nikola Pašić decided to pay a hefty sum to Milan to leave Serbia, as he was constantly in serious debts due to his philandering and gambling. Milan agreed but asked for Natalie to be sent out of Serbia, too, to silence her pro-Russian influence on their son. Natalie refused, so the government decided to expel the queen mother by force on 18 May 1891.

Gendarmes closed the surrounding streets, but Natalie refused to leave. After two hours, during which a huge crowd of citizens gathered, the gendarmes forced her into the closed carriage to transport her to the Sava port and the steamer Deligrad. The public was overwhelmingly on queen's side, so the crowd immediately attacked the gendarmes, prevented them from moving, and tried to "liberate" the queen. Attempted attacks by the gendarmes who used daggers only angered people more, and the crowd continued to grow. At one point, under the rain of stones thrown by the people, the gendarmes fled. Natalie tried to find a shelter, but the crowd lifted her up, carried her in their arms, put her back in the carriage, unharnessed the horses and in a triumphant procession through cities main streets, dragged the carriage with bare arms and returned queen to her house.

Queen thanked the people from her window, but the government dispatched army now. Citizens began throwing stones at the army too, but the soldiers were already given the order to shoot the mass, so they opened fire. After killing one older citizen and two young apprentices, the crowd dispersed. Not wanting to be a reason for further bloodshed, Natalie quit resisting and in the early morning was conducted by the entire military garrison to the train station. The "London Clashes" were the first instance in Serbian history where police or military was ordered by the government to shoot its own people. Though later putting blame on others, it was confirmed that prime minister Pašić personally and illegally gave the order.

=== 20th century ===
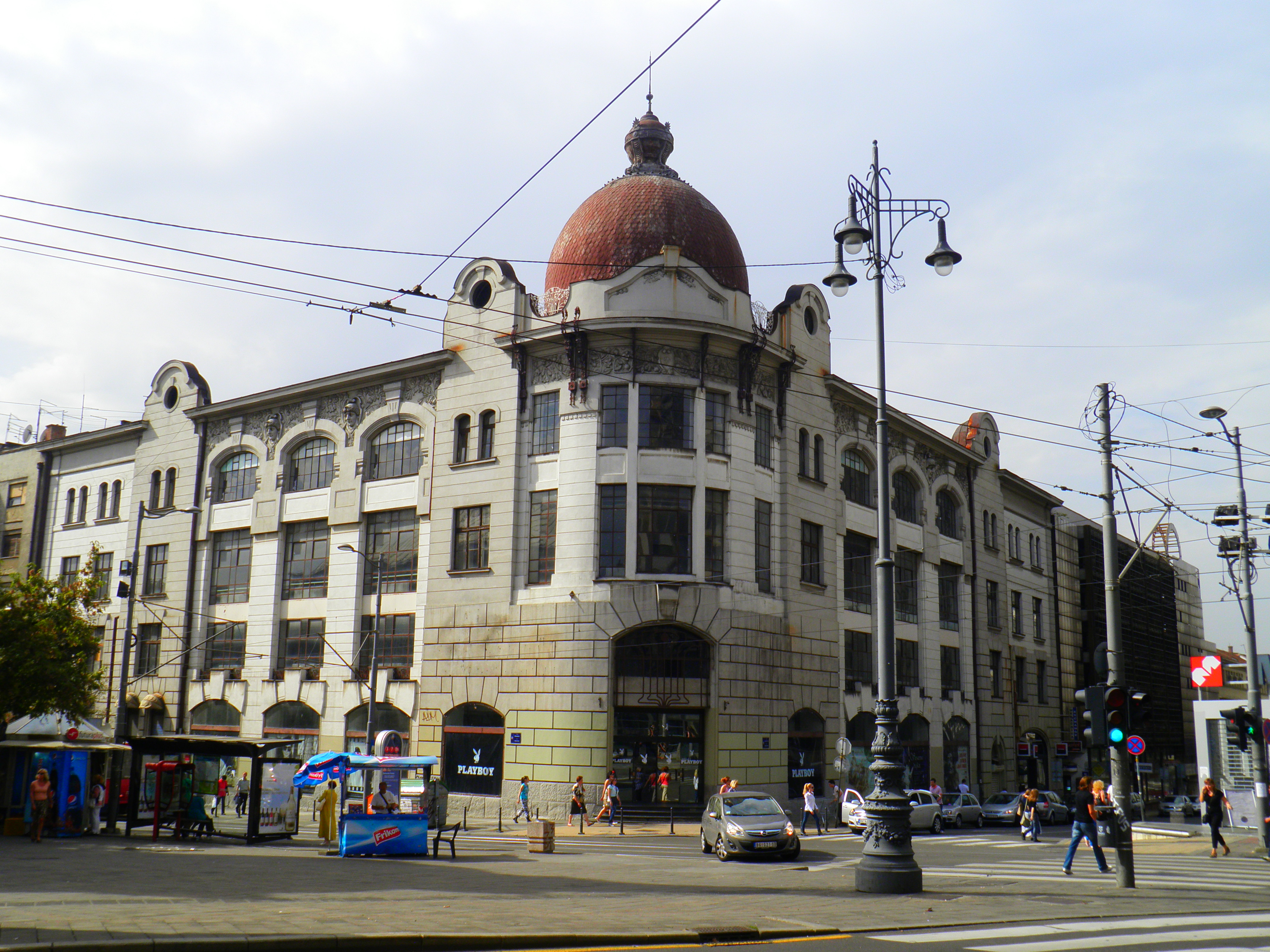
Officers Cooperative building, popularly known as Kluz

In 1908, a two-storey building of the Officers Cooperative was built at the corner of the modern Masarikova and Resavska streets. Designed by Svetozar Jovanović, Danilo Vladisavljević and Vladimir Popović, and built with stone, brick and limestone plaster, it is one of the most important representatives of the secession style in Belgrade. The central façade is modern, with large, multi-floor windows. Secession influence includes vertical ornaments, female heads, floral plastics, decorative consoles and cast-iron window bars. The dome, which is among the "largest and most beautiful" in Belgrade, is work of the tinsmith Milan Ilić. The building hosted a textile factory and department store "Kluz" for decades, so it is better known by that name. It was declared a cultural monument in 1979. After the bankruptcy of "Kluz", it was turned into the Chinese store in the 21st century and purchased by the Zepter company.

The first traffic light in the city was placed at the crossroad of the Bulevar kralja Aleksandra and Takovska Street in November 1939, just above London. The idea was to place them at every busy crossroad in the city, but the outbreak of World War II halted the plan. Instead, the second traffic light was placed at London only in 1953. In 1965, along the entire Kneza Miloša Street, the first green wave was introduced.

The hotel was later closed due to the ruining in 1962 and the kafana, later modern restaurant, was opened instead. In the 1980s, a popular disco club "London" was opened in the building.

In 1991 the restaurant was turned into one of the branches of the "Dafiment banka", one of two major pyramid schemes in Serbia (the second has been "Jugoskandic"). After the collapse of "Dafiment", London was turned into a casino, later into a wine club. As of 2019, it hosts one of the supermarkets of the Idea retail chain. Still, all venues always had name London in their names: Restoran London, Casino London, Idea London, etc.
