= Andrićev Venac =

Andrićev Venac Андрићев венац
- Urban neighbourhood
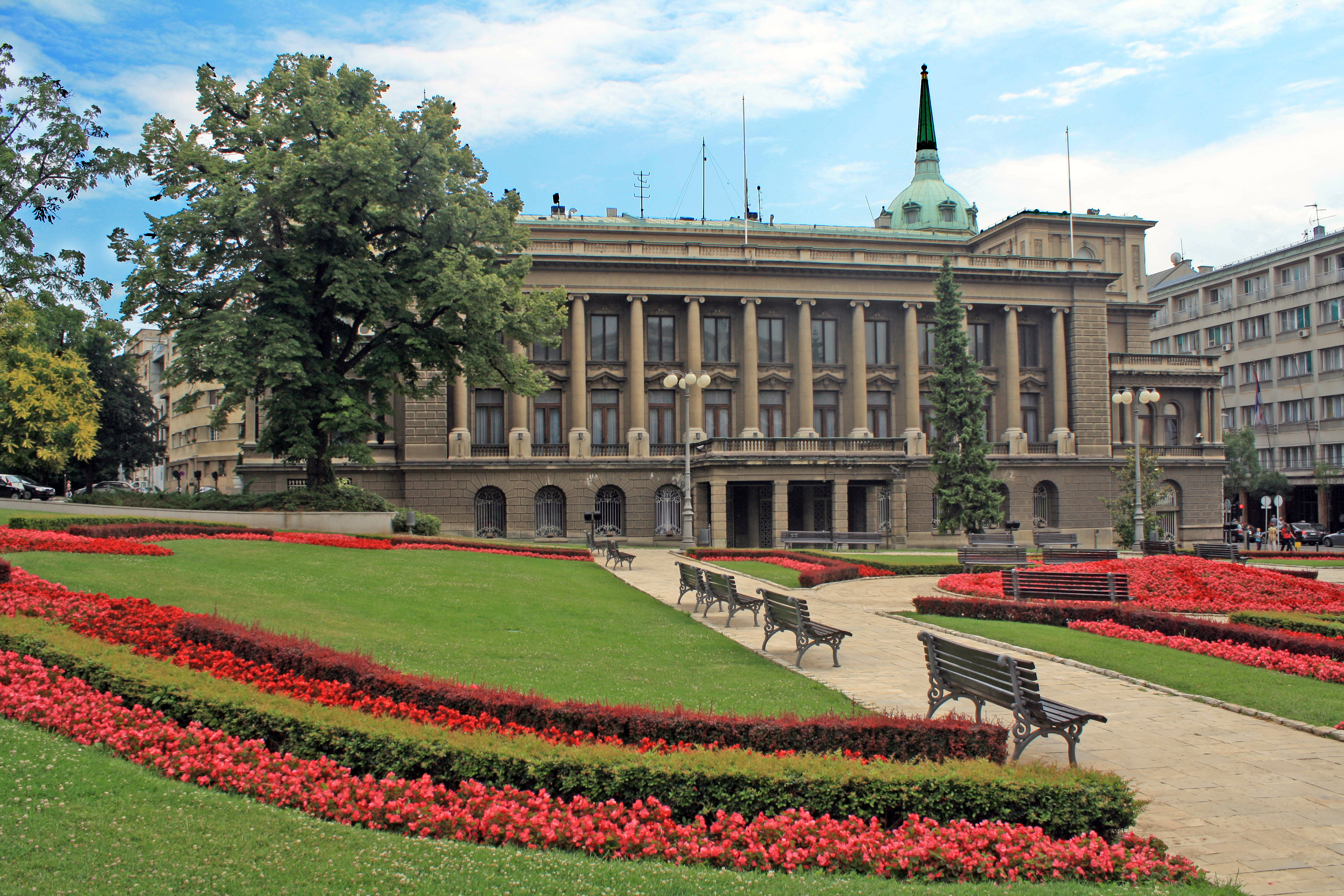
- Novi Dvor

- Location within Belgrade
- Coordinates: 44°48′35″N 20°27′50″E
- Country: Serbia
- Region: Belgrade
- Municipality: Stari Grad
- Time zone: UTC+1 (CET)
  - Summer (DST): UTC+2 (CEST)
- Area code: +381(0)11
- Car plates: BG

Andrićev Venac (Serbian Cyrillic: Андрићев венац; pronounced [ǎːndritɕeʋ ʋěːnats]) is a street and the surrounding urban neighborhood of Belgrade, the capital of Serbia. It is located in Belgrade's municipality of Stari Grad. As the official seat of the President of Serbia is located in it, it became synonymous for the politics of the president.

== Location ==
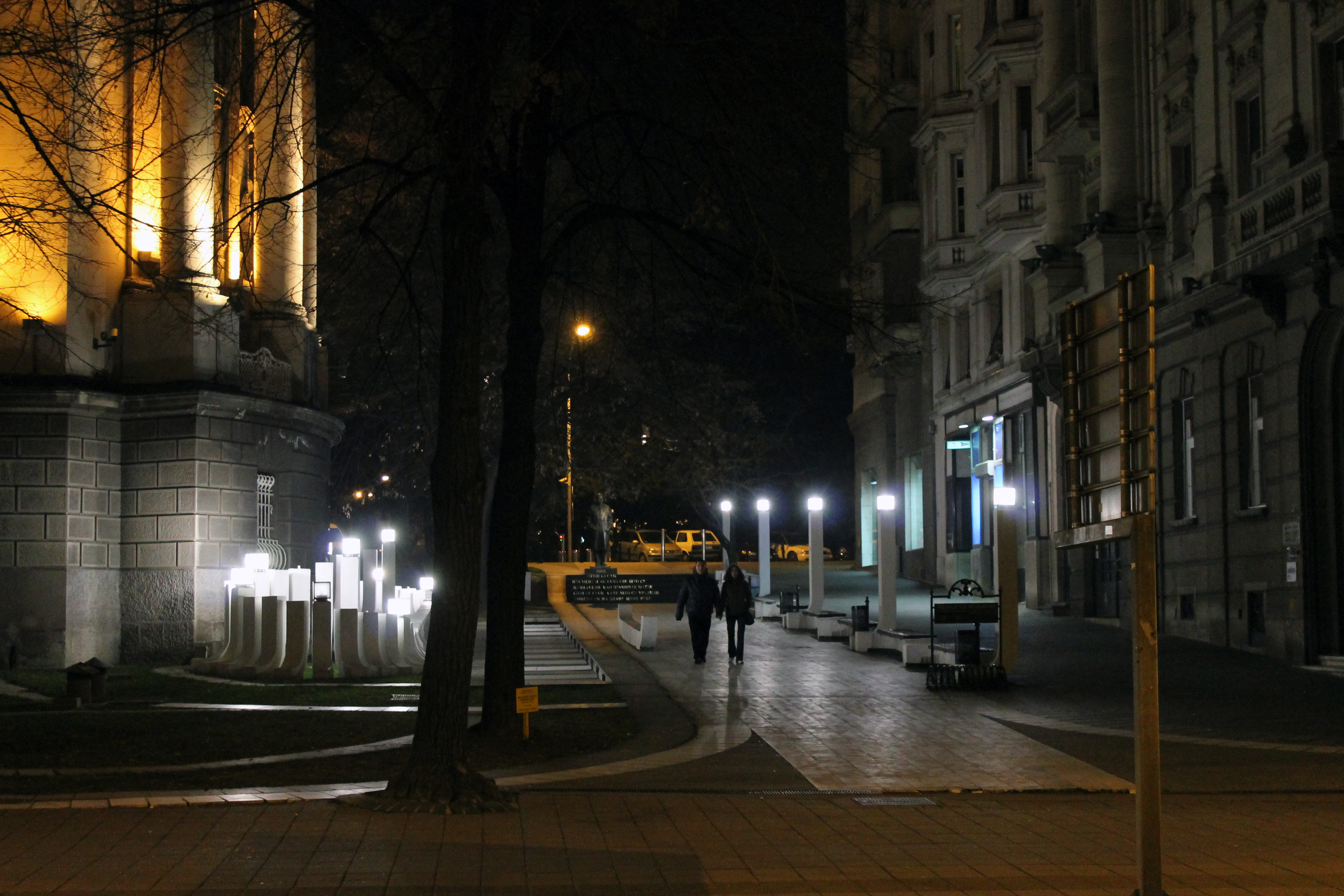
Andrićev Venac in winter at night

Andrićev Venac is encompassing a corner of the Kralja Milana Street and Kneza Miloša Street, two main streets in downtown Belgrade with the street-promenade of the same name traversing through the small neighborhood. It is some 400 m (1,300 ft) south-east from Terazije, Belgrade's downtown. It extends into the neighborhood of London in the south and south-west, into Terazije in the north-west, Krunski Venac in the east, Pioneers Park in the north-east and the Nikola Pašić Square in the north.

== Characteristics ==
=== Promenade ===
The central area is a pedestrian zone, a short paved promenade which connects Pioneers Park and "Kralja Milana" street. Andrićev Venac is named after Yugoslav Nobel laureate in literature, Ivo Andrić. The promenade has benches, artistic candelabra, lime trees (Green Crimean linden, "Tilia euchlora Koch.", which are under the state protection), and an artificial, marble step-like stream originating from a fountain and a monument to Andrić. However, the writers own bequest, the Ivo Andrić Foundation, is not located here but in Dorćol. The entire area has been given an artistic character as several galleries ("Galerija Ozone") and bookstores are located along the eastern side of the promenade.

=== Ivo Andrić Memorial Museum ===
The museum is located across the Pioneers Park. It is actually an adapted flat in which Ivo Andrić and his wife Milica Babić-Jovanović lived. The memorial museum is similar in concept to the Maison de Victor Hugo in Paris. The museum has two permanent exhibitions. A number of exhibits from the Ivo Andrić Bequest is placed in 17 display cases, arranged chronologically from Andrić's birth to his death. The Bequest was founded in 1975 after Andrić's death and it still manages the author's rights. It includes original pens and biros used by the author, medals, accolades and numerous paintings including Andrić's portraits done by his friends. There are also fragments of author's four manuscripts, as the bulk of his handwritten works is in the archive of the Serbian Academy of Sciences and Arts.

The other exhibit includes the chair, writing desk and a television set. The apartment kept the authentic look it had while Andrić lived in it. There is also a library which holds an old Spanish issue of Don Quixote. There are 4,502 books in the library, of which some 500 are presentation copies, signed by the authors who personally gifted the copies to Andrić, who himself was a bibliophile. Being a diplomat, he formed his library collecting books from Madrid, Paris, Marseille, Berlin, Geneva, etc.

Central section of the exhibit is a diplomatic suitcase used by Andrić, and his blue ceremonial uniform which he used for special occasions since 1938 when he was a Yugoslav ambassador in Berlin. Coincidentally, the uniform was designed by Babić-Jovanović, a costume designer in the National Theatre in Belgrade, which will marry Andrić 20 years later, in 1958. Writer's Nobel prize is on a special display.

=== Novi Dvor ===
The entire western side of the promenade is occupied by Novi Dvor (New Palace), the seat of the President of the Republic. Novi Dvor was built between 1913 and 1918 on a project by Stojan Titelbah, as a new palace for King Peter I Karađorđević and it is separated just by a lawn from Stari Dvor (Old Palace), used by the previous monarchs of Serbia, from rival Obrenović dynasty. Peter I died in 1921 and it was his son, King Alexander I of Yugoslavia who was the first tenant, from 1922. Novi Dvor was official royal residence of Kingdom of Yugoslavia until Alexander's assassination in Marseille in 1934, after which the royal residence was moved to Kraljevski Dvor (Royal Palace) in Dedinje Royal Compound. From 1974 Novi Dvor had been used as an office for the Presidency of Serbia, a collective governing body, and since 1991 it has been the official seat of the President of Serbia.
