= Park Aleksandrov =

Park in Belgrade, Serbia

- Парк Александров
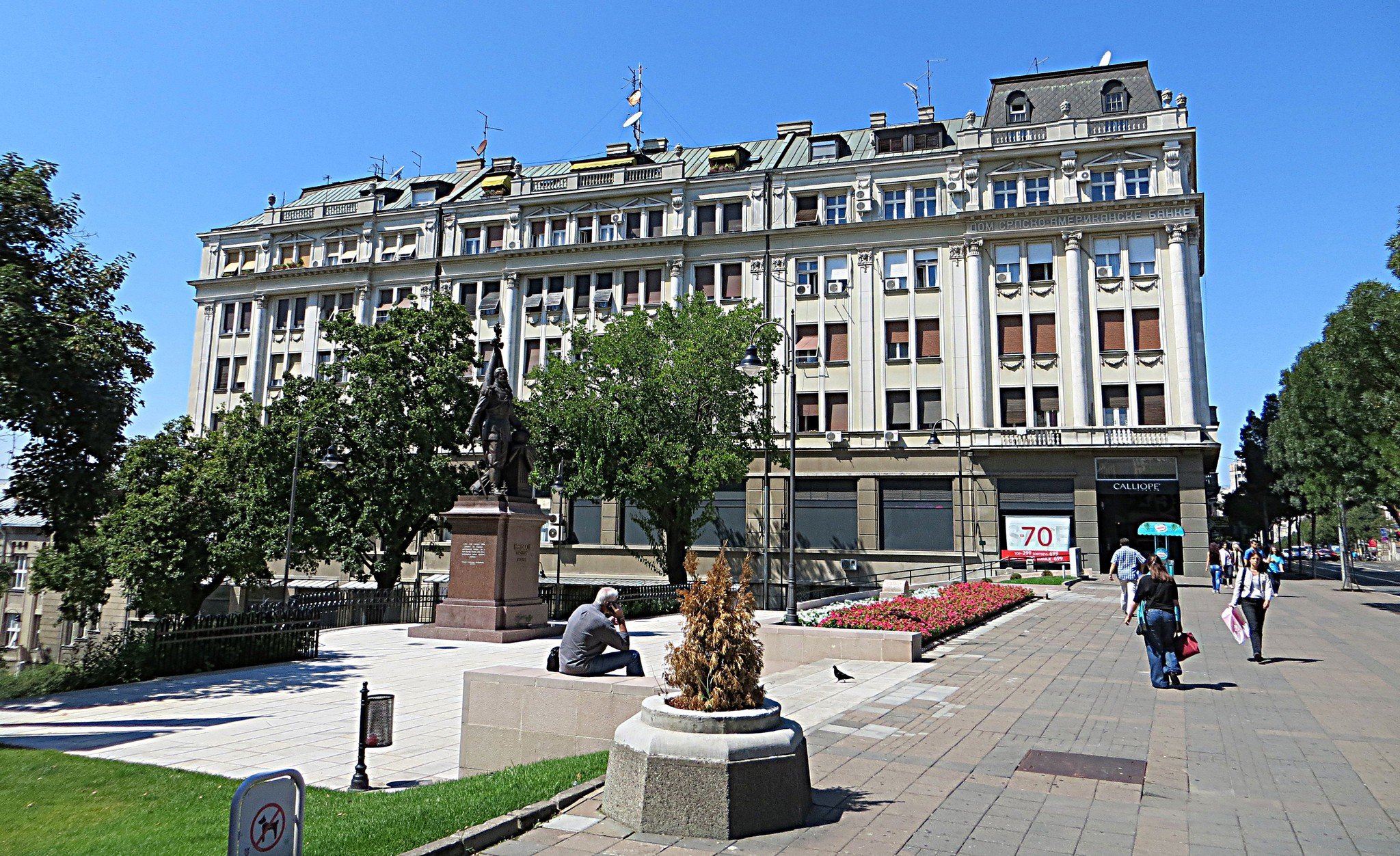
- Upper section of the park

- Location within Belgrade
- Location: Stari Grad, Belgrade
- Coordinates: 44.8099866°N 20.4619589°E
- Open: All year

Park Aleksandrov (Serbian: Парк Александров) is a park in Belgrade, a capital of Serbia. It is situated in the sole center of the city, along the main Kralja Milana street. Named Devojački Park until 2017, it is located in the municipality of Stari Grad.

== Location ==
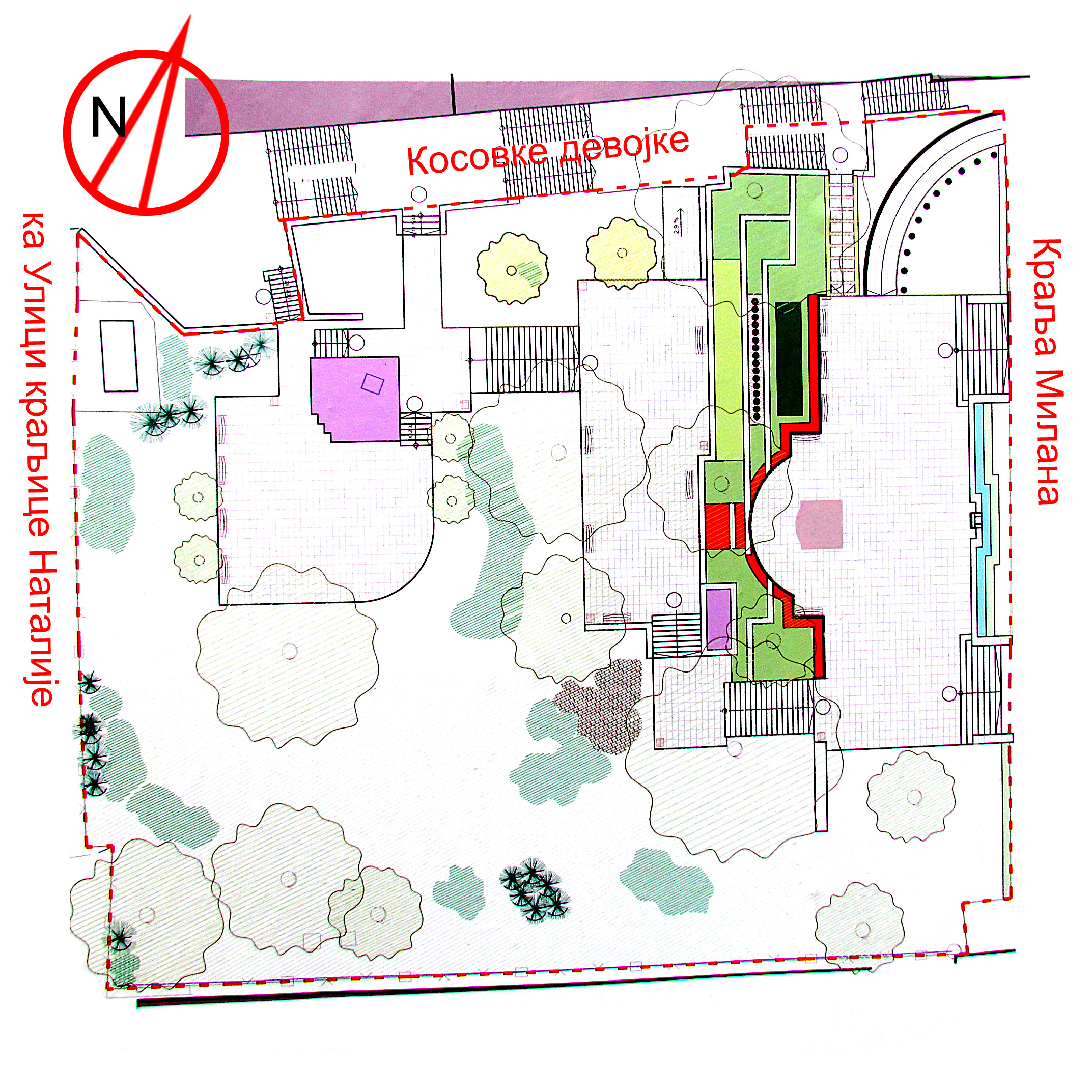
Map of the park

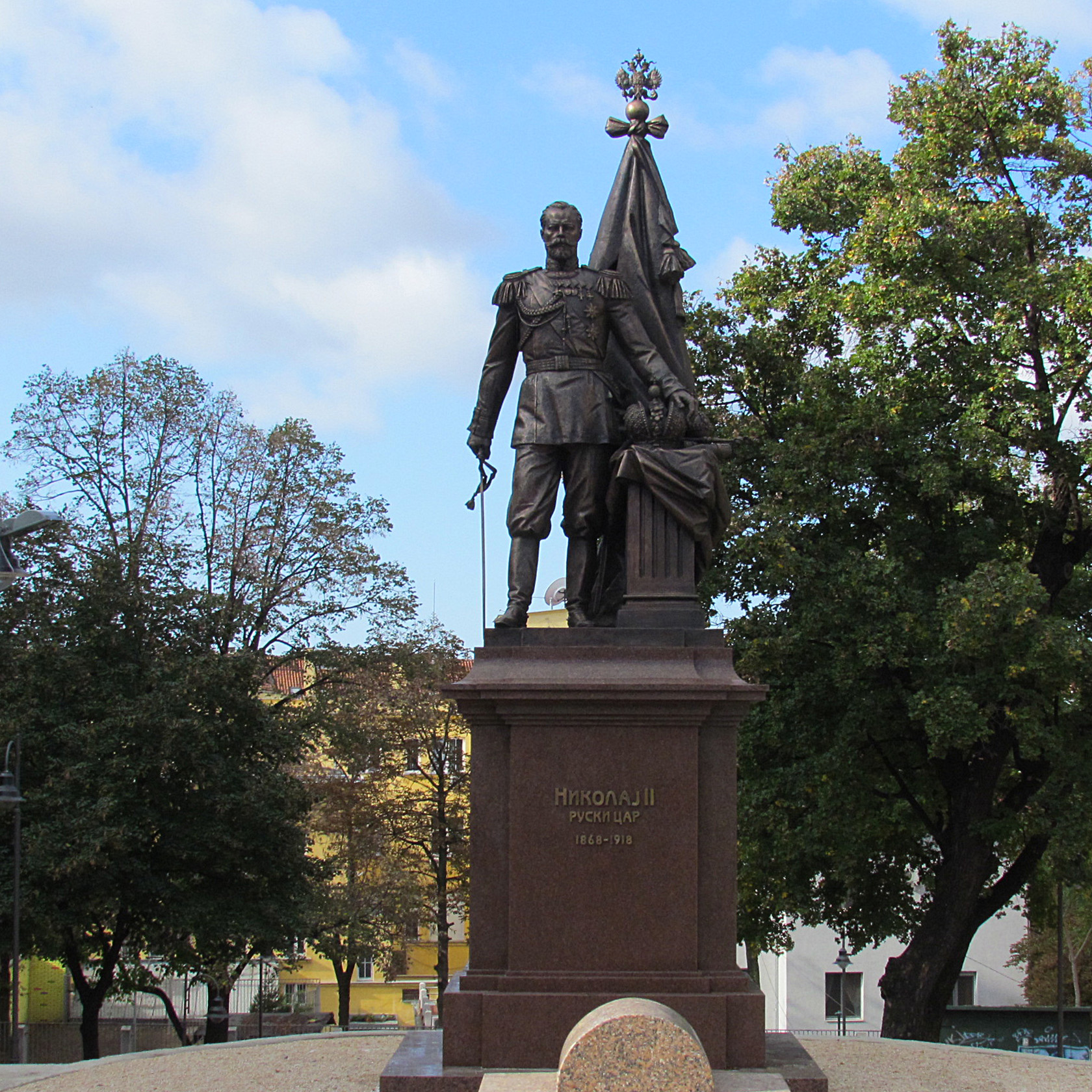
Monument to the emperor Nicholas II in Park Aleksandrov

The park is bounded by the streets of Kralja Milana on the east, Kosovke devojke on the north and Kraljice Natalije on the west. Southern edge is bordered by the old building of the National Assembly of Serbia.

== Name and history ==
Park Aleksandrov is one of the newer parks in the city. It was formed in the 1950s and 1960s when the "Simić’s House", seat of the former Russian mission to Belgrade (and after World War II a trade representation of the Soviet Union), was demolished. The lot was purchased by Stojan Simić in the late 1830s. Simić was a politician and a businessman, member of the influential Simić family, notable in the 19th century Serbia, both in politics and culture.

In 1863, in the Kraljice Natalije street, the first Serbian high school level institution for the education of the girls was established, Higher School for Girls. Nearby street was subsequently named Devojačka (Serbian for the "girl street") and today is called Kosovke Devojke, so when park was formed much later, it was colloquially named Devojački Park (Girl's Park). On 18 April 2017, Belgrade City Assembly officially changed its name to Park Aleksandrov, after the Alexandrov Ensemble, army choir of the Red Army. They held frequent performances in Belgrade, and on 25 December 2016 many of the ensemble members perished in an airplane crash over the Black Sea.

== Characteristics ==
Park is small, built like a cascade on the slope. It covers an area of 3,000 m^{2} (32,000 sq ft), of which 2,000 m^{2} (22,000 sq ft) are green areas.

Across the Kralja Milana street are located two former Royal courts: Stari Dvor, former residence of the Obrenović dynasty which is today seat of the Belgrade City Hall and Novi Dvor, former residence of the Karađorđević dynasty, present seat of the President of Serbia. Below the park are Belgrade’s Mathematical Gymnasium, The Russian House - Russian Centre of Science and Culture and Nikola Tesla School for Electrical Engineering (former Higher School for Girls). Before the girls' school was built as a donation by the Queen Maria, there was a chapel on the location, dedicated to the Saint Natalia of Nicomedia.

Based on the project of an architect Janko Krstić, the park was reconstructed in 2014. On 16 November 2014 the park was reopened for the public and the occasion was marked with the unveiling of the monument to the last Russian emperor, Nicholas II of Russia. The monument, donated by the Russian Historical Society, is sculpted by Andrey Kovalchuk and Gennady Pravotorov. It is 7.5 m (25 ft) high, out of which 3.5 m (11 ft) the monument itself. The pedestal is made of granite and the monument of bronze. The monument weights a 40 tons and has an inscription on the pedestal which marks the words of Emperor Nicholas: "All my efforts will be directed to preserving the dignity of Serbia and in any case, Russia will not be indifferent to the fate of Serbia".

On the plateau next to the monument there is a stone with a relief of the demolished "Simić’s House" which occupied the area. On 10 November 2017 a commemorative plaque in tribute to perished choir members was placed in the park and the birch seedlings were planted.
