= Battle of Kaymakchalan =

1916 battle

Coordinates: 40°56′32″N 21°48′17″E

Battle of Kajmakčalan
- Part of the Serbian Campaign of the Balkans Theatre of World War I
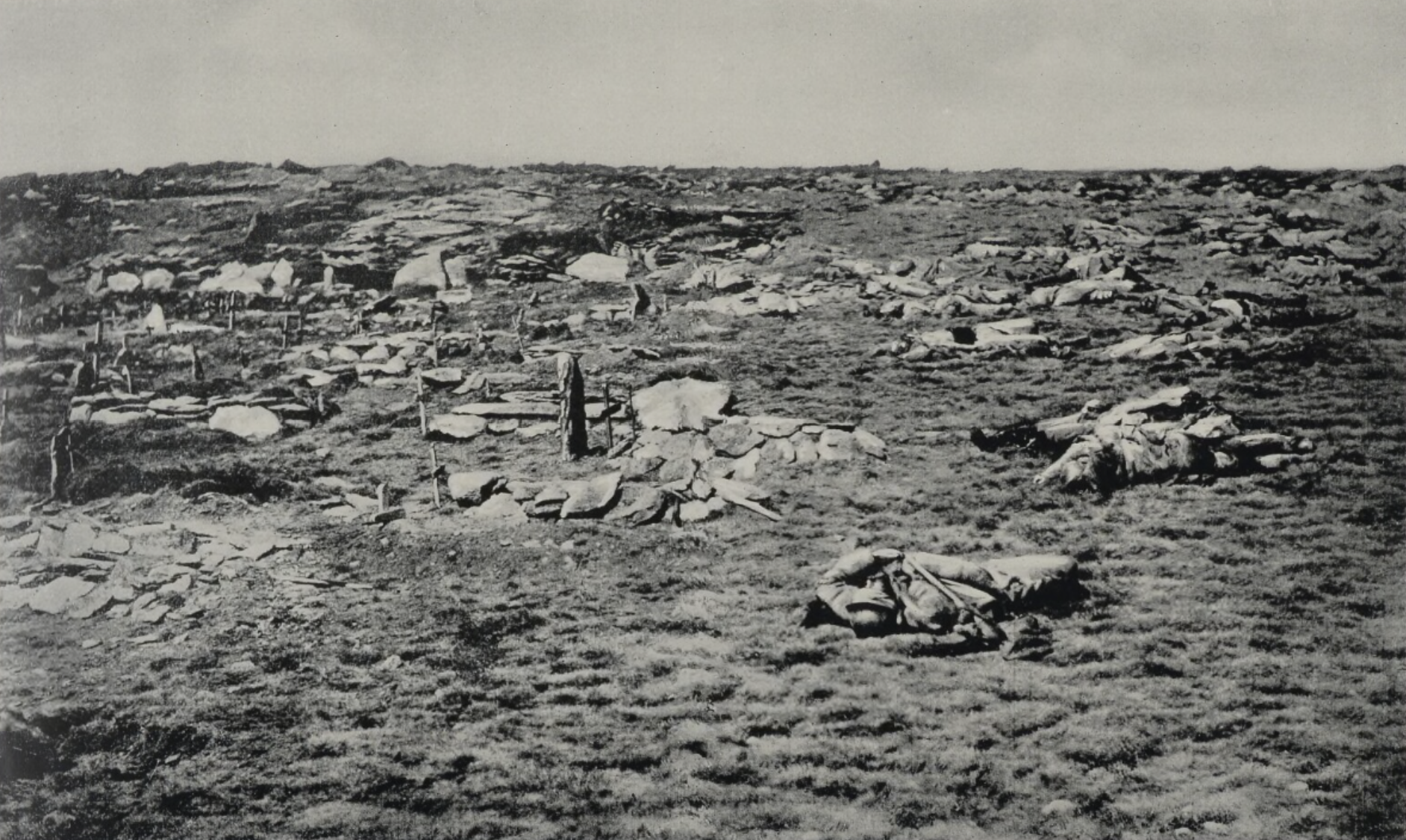
- Battlefield of Kaymachatlan after the battle
Date	12–30 September 1916
Location	Kajmakčalan, Bulgarian-occupied Kingdom of Serbia and Kingdom of Greece (present-day North Macedonia and Greece)
Result	Serbian victory

Belligerents
Serbia	Bulgaria; German Empire

Commanders and leaders
(Kingdom of Serbia) Živojin Mišić	(Tsardom of Bulgaria (1908–1946)) Kliment Boyadzhiev

Strength
1st Army with main effort by Drina Division	1st brigade of 3rd "Balkan" Infantry Division with the main effort by 11th "Sliven" Regiment

Casualties and losses
4,643 casualties of which 3/4 belonging to the Drina Division	Soldiers: 1,876 dead; 5,941 wounded; Officers: 51 dead; 126 wounded

The Battle of Kaymakchalan was fought between Serbian, Bulgarian and German troops on the Macedonian front during World War I.

The battle was fought between 12 and 30 September 1916, when the Serbian army managed to capture the peak of Prophet Elijah while pushing the Bulgarians towards the town of Mariovo, where the latter formed new defensive lines. Between 26 and 30 September, the peak changed hands several times until the Serbian army decisively captured it on the 30th.

The battle proved to be very costly for both sides. Serbian losses had reached around 10,000 killed and wounded by 23 September. The Bulgarian companies had been reduced to 90 men each, and one regiment, the 11th Sliven Regiment, had 73 officers and 3,000 men hors de combat.

From a strategic standpoint, the battle was not a significant success for the Allies due to the upcoming winter that rendered further military engagements almost impossible.

Today, there is a small St. Peter's Church on the peak of Prophet Elijah where the skulls of dead Serbian soldiers are stored, and it is regarded as a cultural site and is a tourist attraction. There is confusion about the name of the church, but it is called Saint Peter's (Sveti Petar in Serbian), which stands on the peak called Prophet Elijah.

== Gallery ==
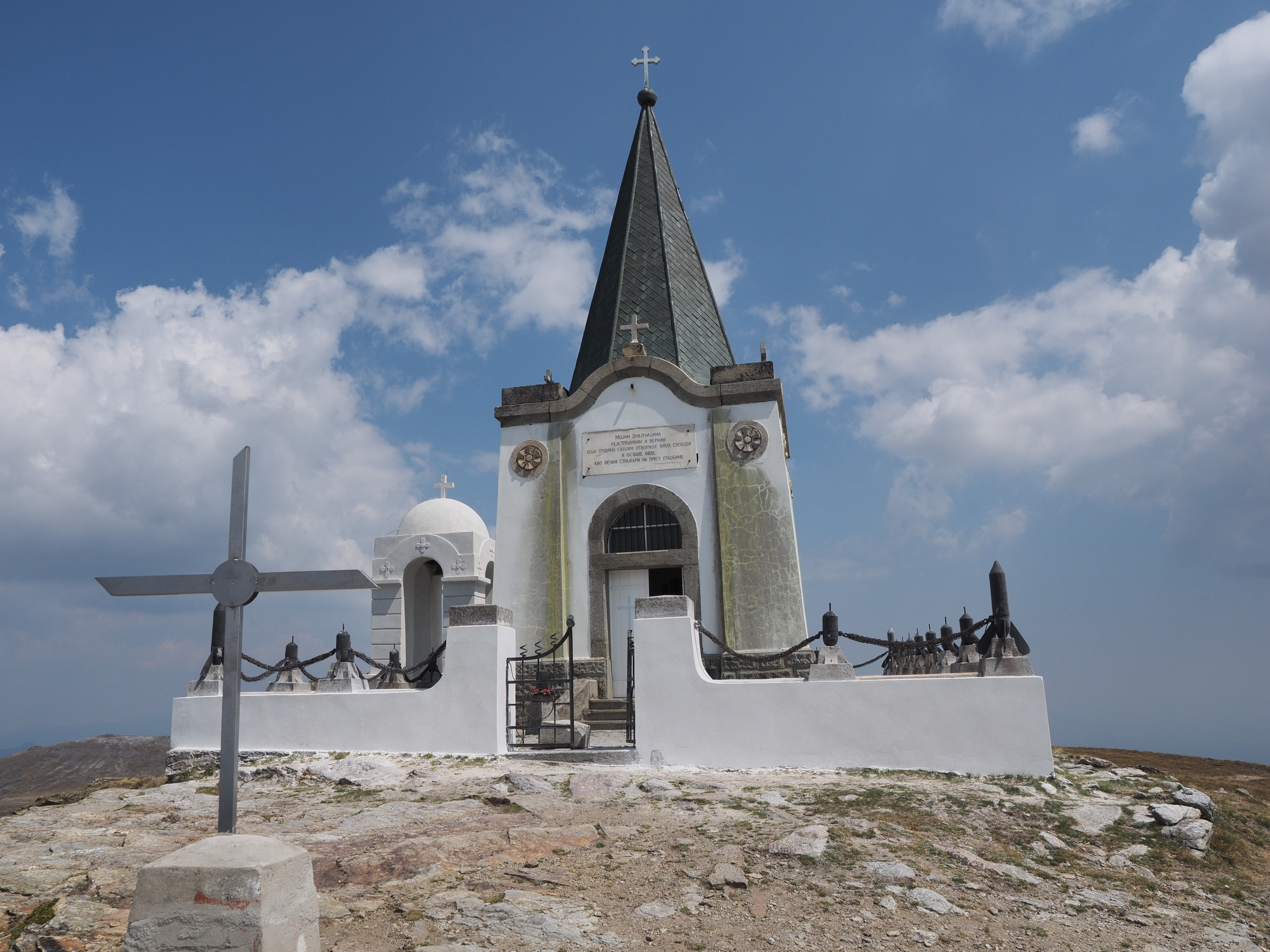
The St. Peter's Church at Kajmakčalan

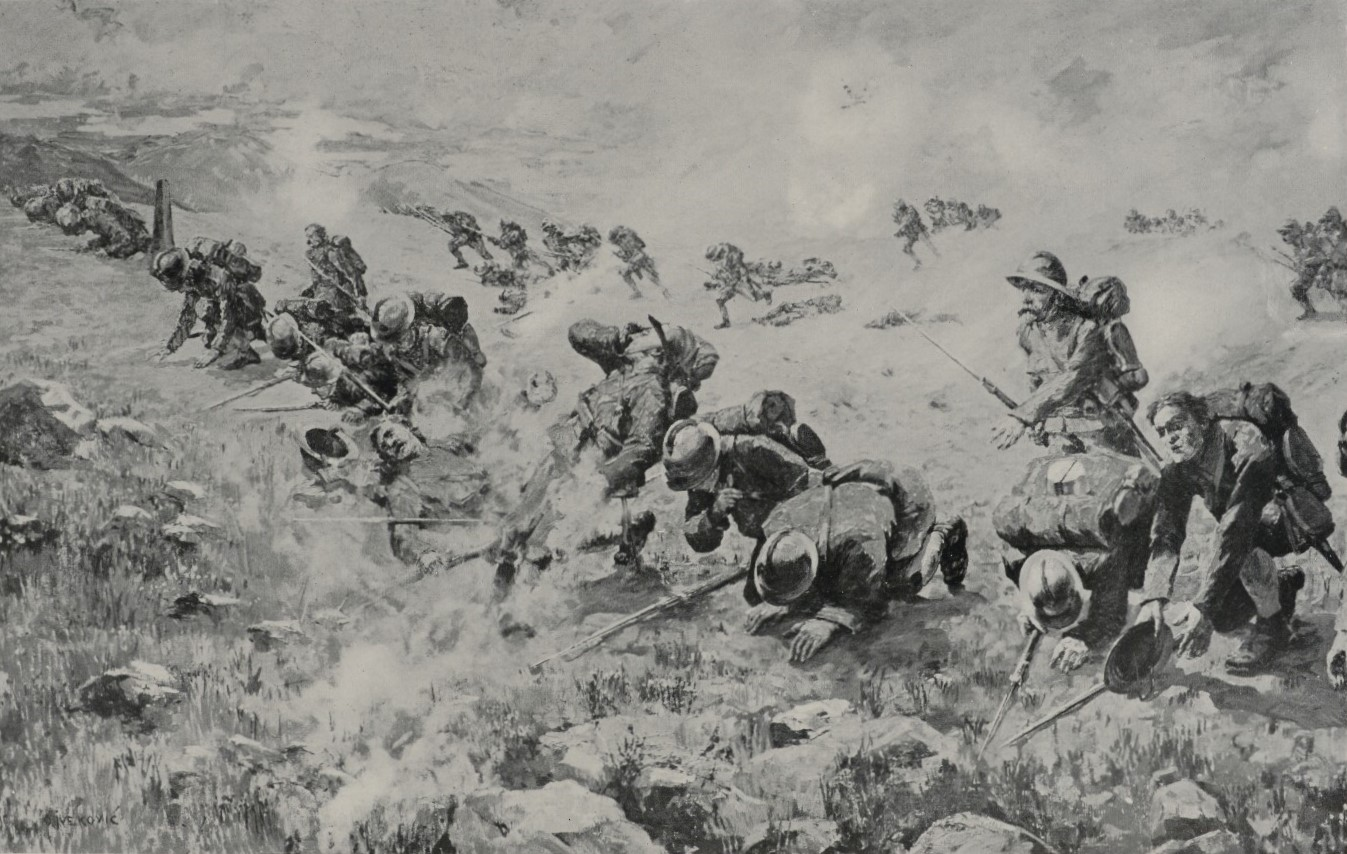
Oton Iveković: Battle of Kaymakchalan

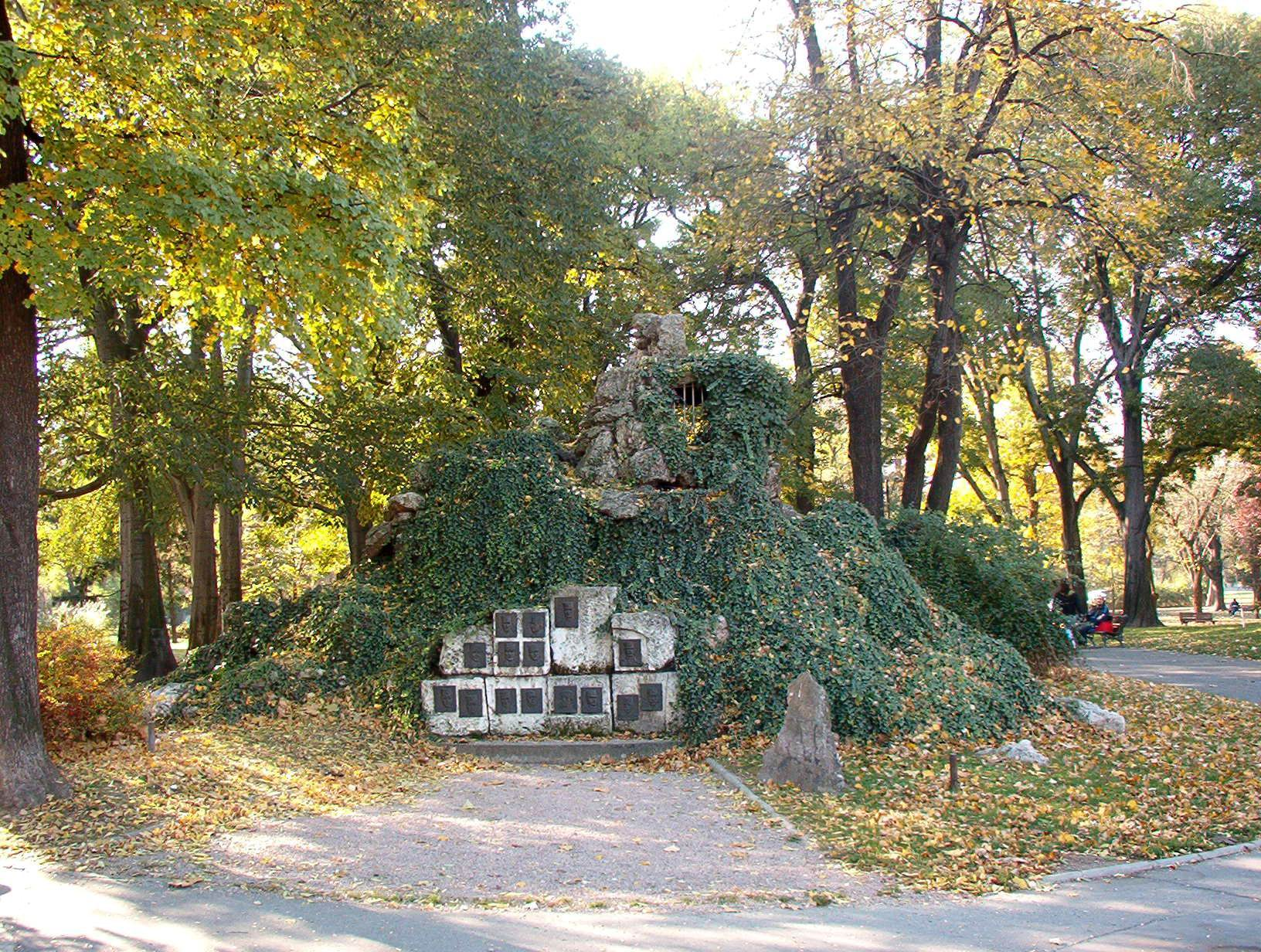
Observation Post of the Serbian Army High Command on Kajmakčalan, moved to Pioneers Park, Belgrade

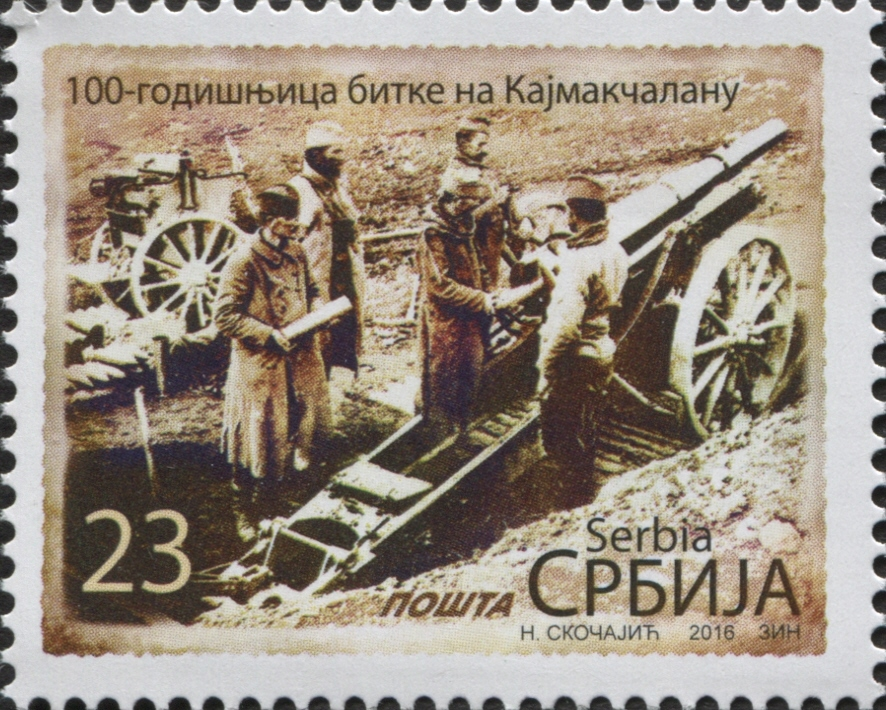
Commemoration post stamp of Serbia for 100th anniversary (2016)

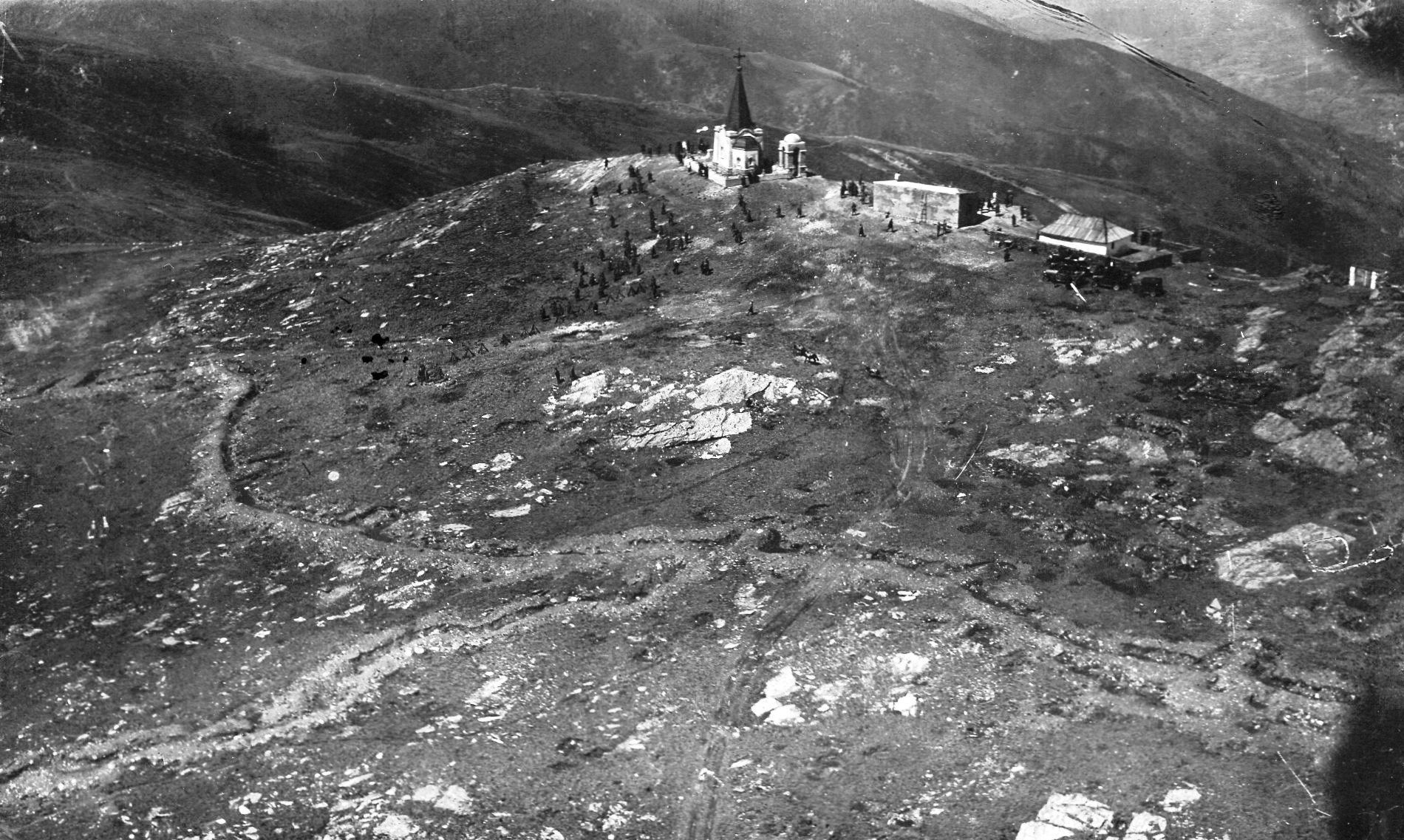
Kajmakčalan in 1930 (trenches can be easily seen even today)

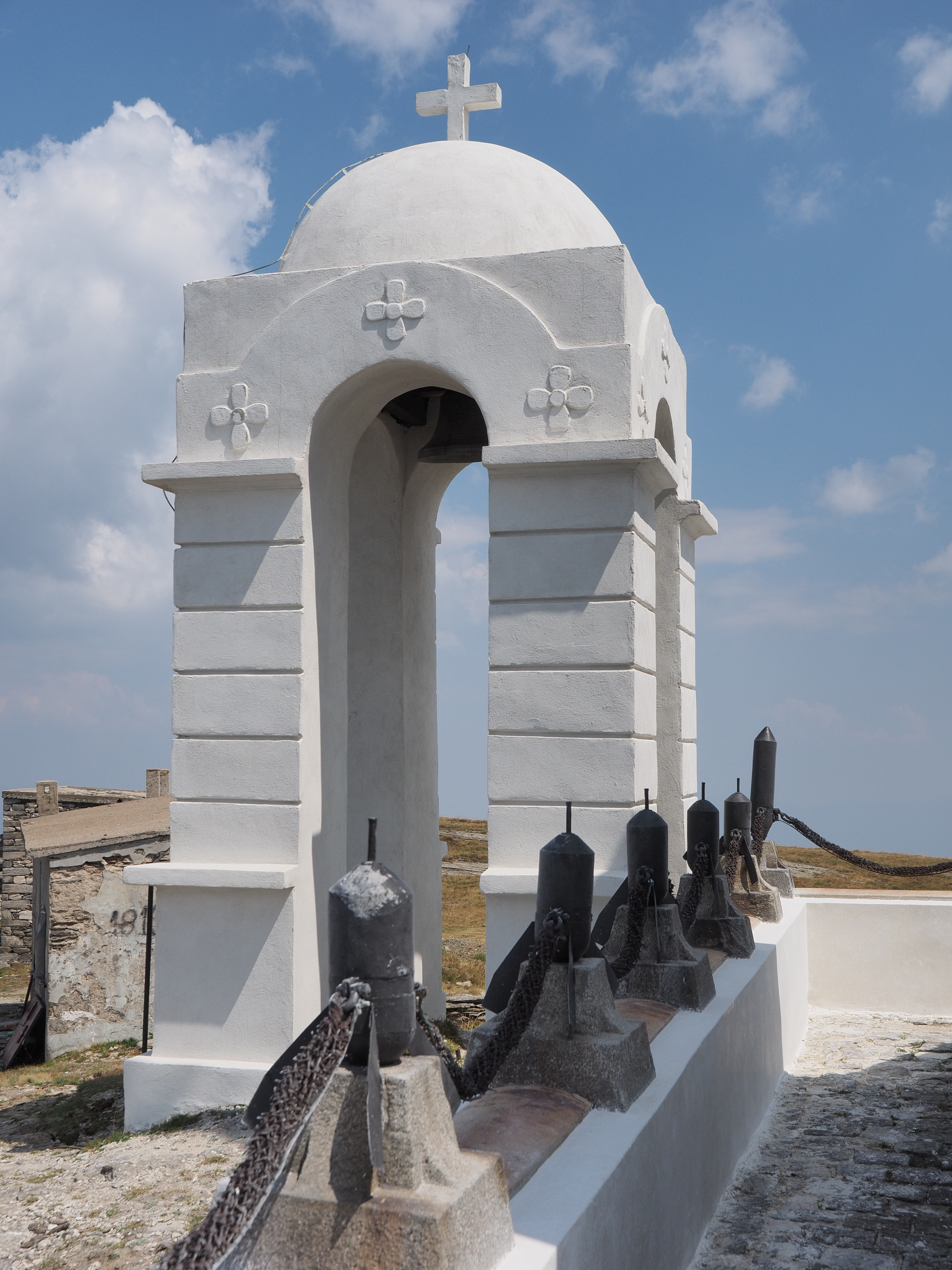
Bell at the St. Peter's Church on the top

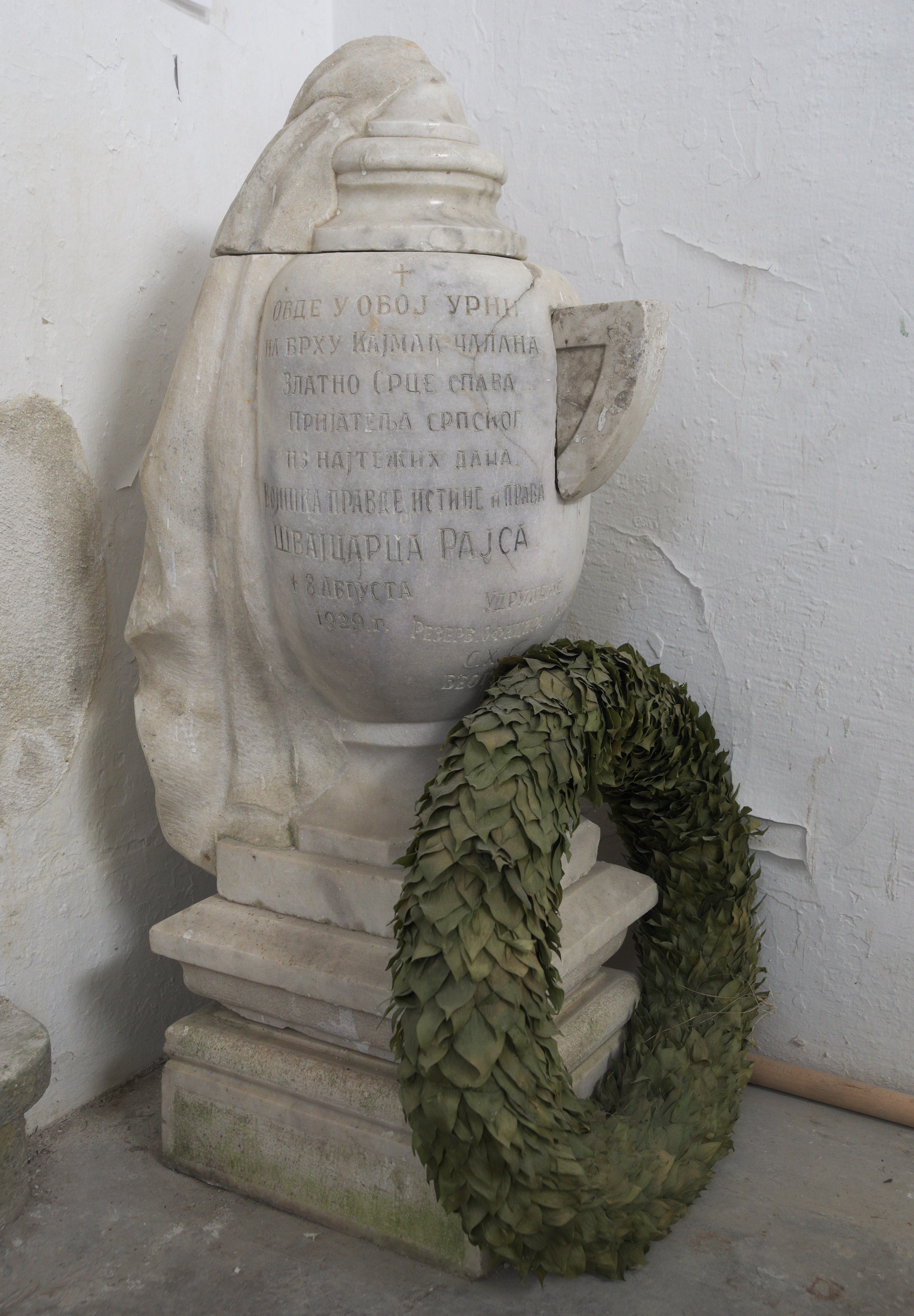
Urn with heart of Archibald Reiss, original was destroyed by Bulgarians in World War II

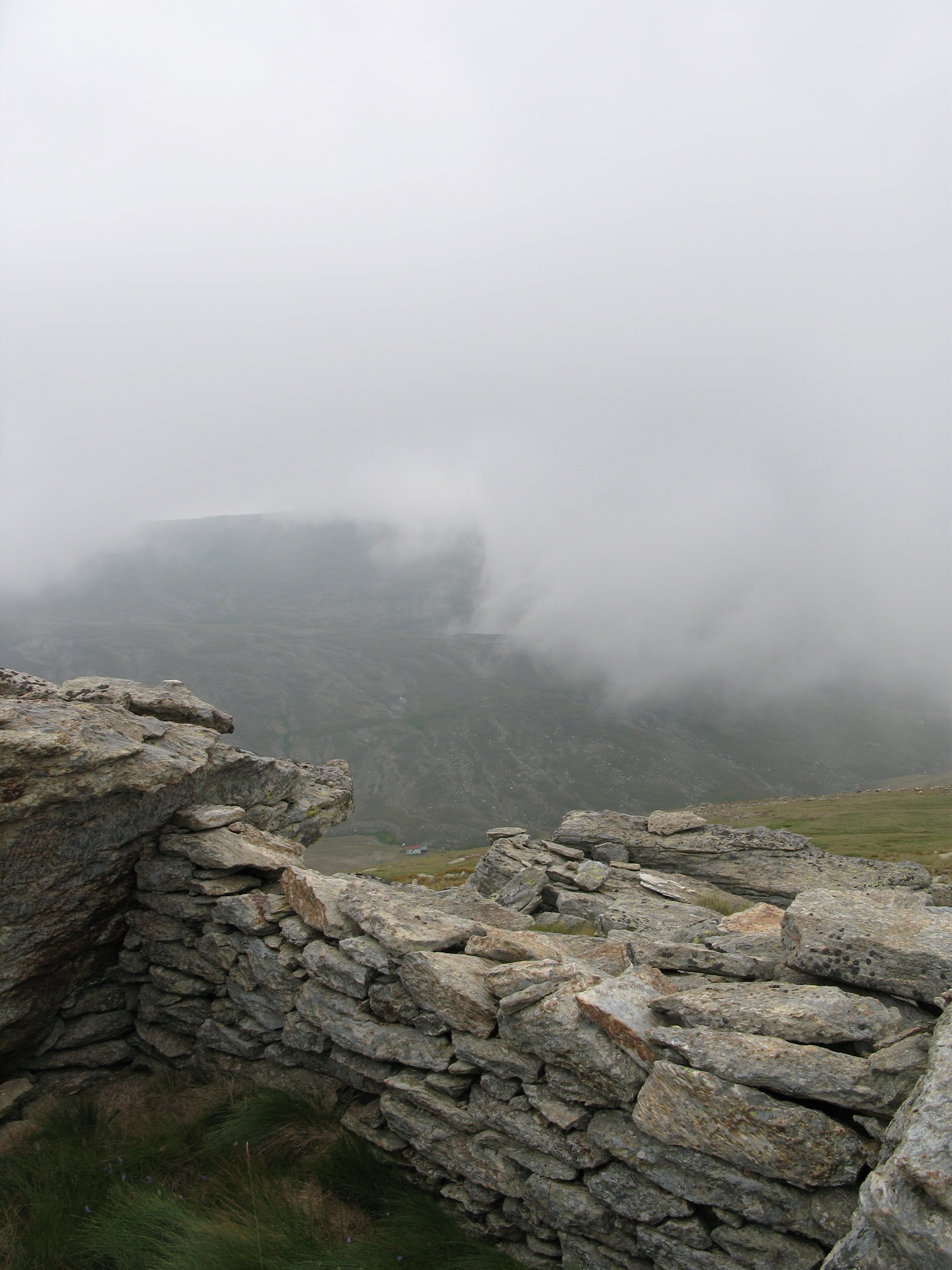
Remains of Bulgarian bunker

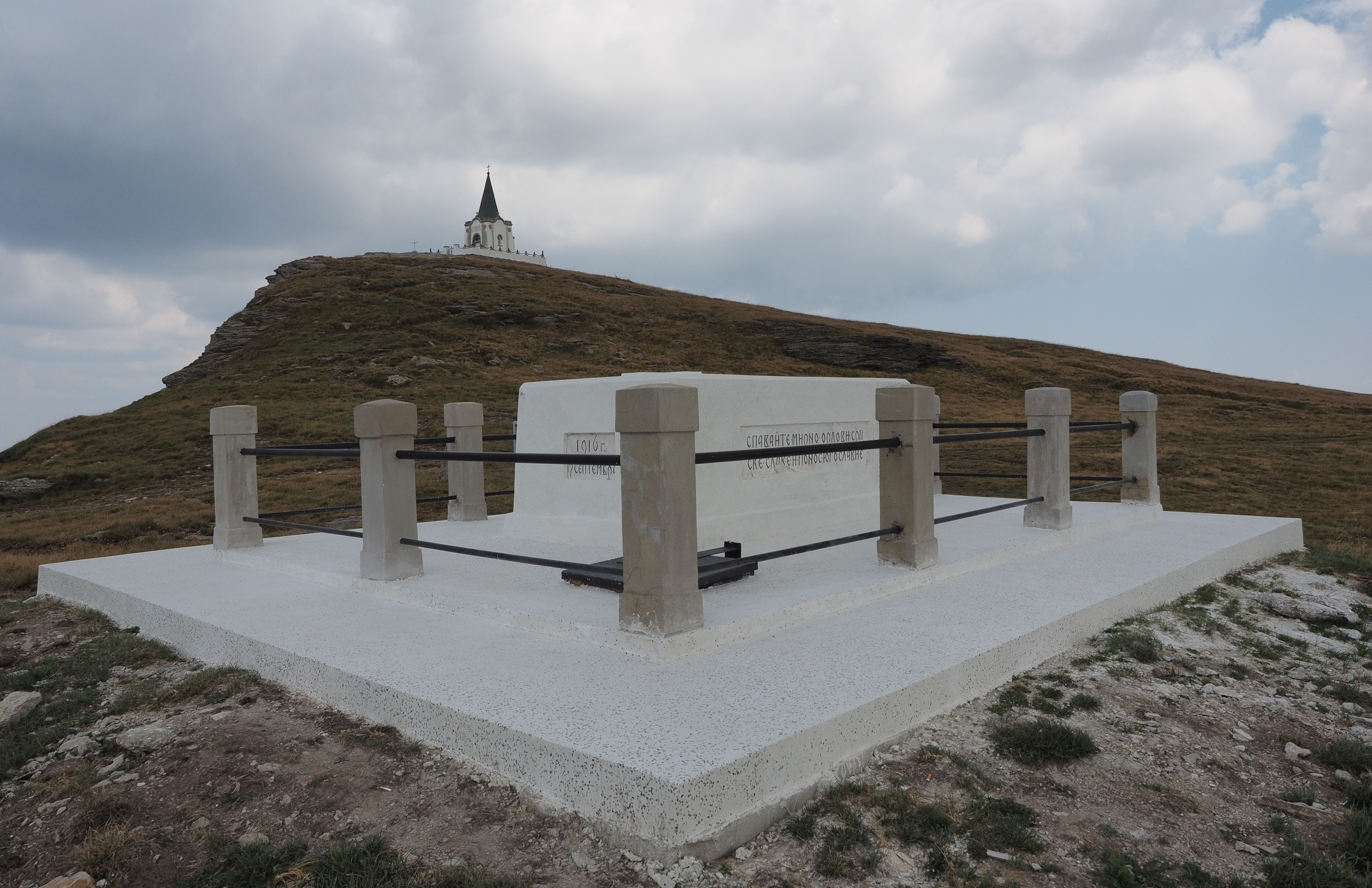
Ossuary of Serbian soldiers (many bones were found later around the mountain)

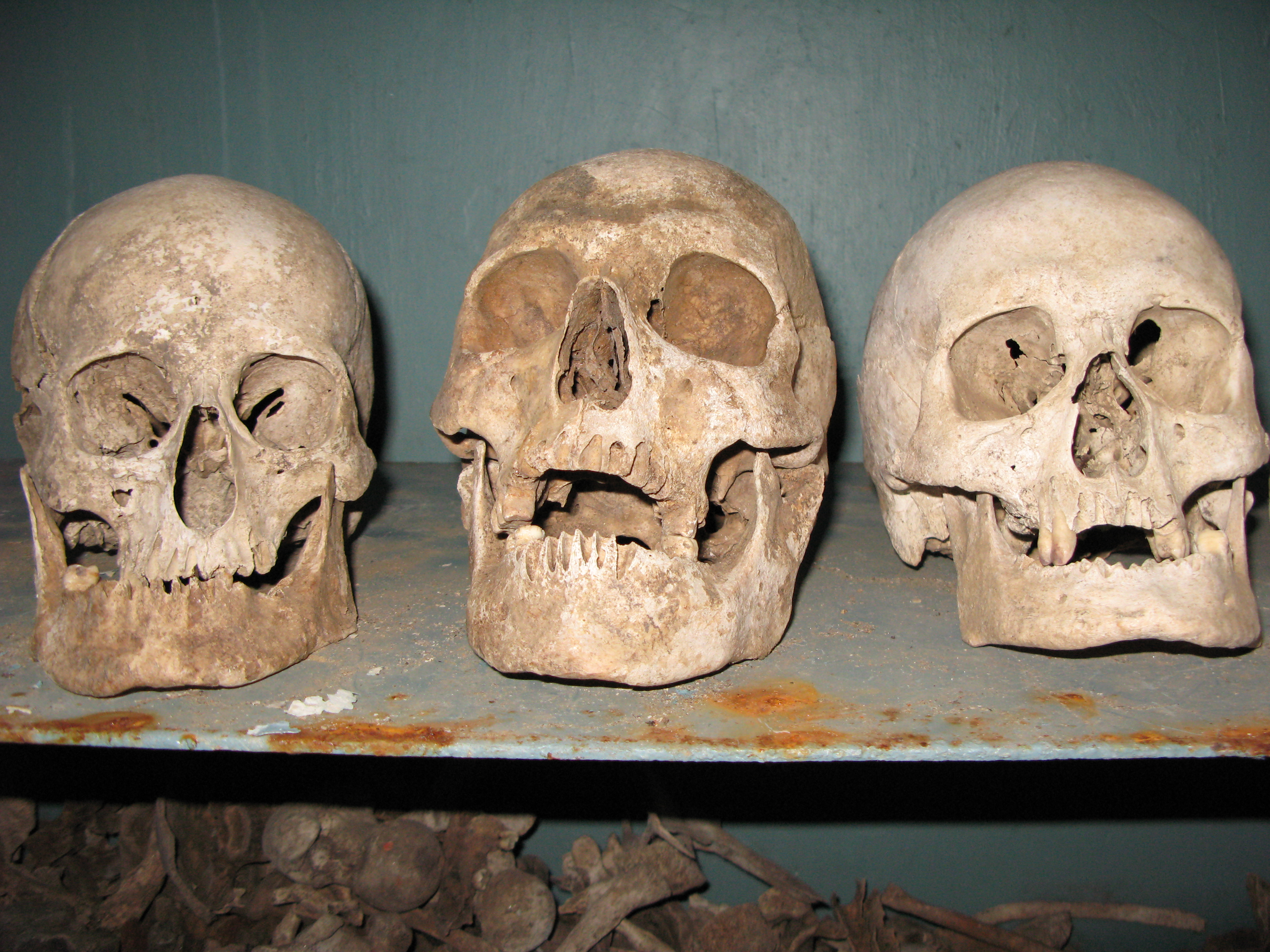
Ossuary of Serbian soldiers

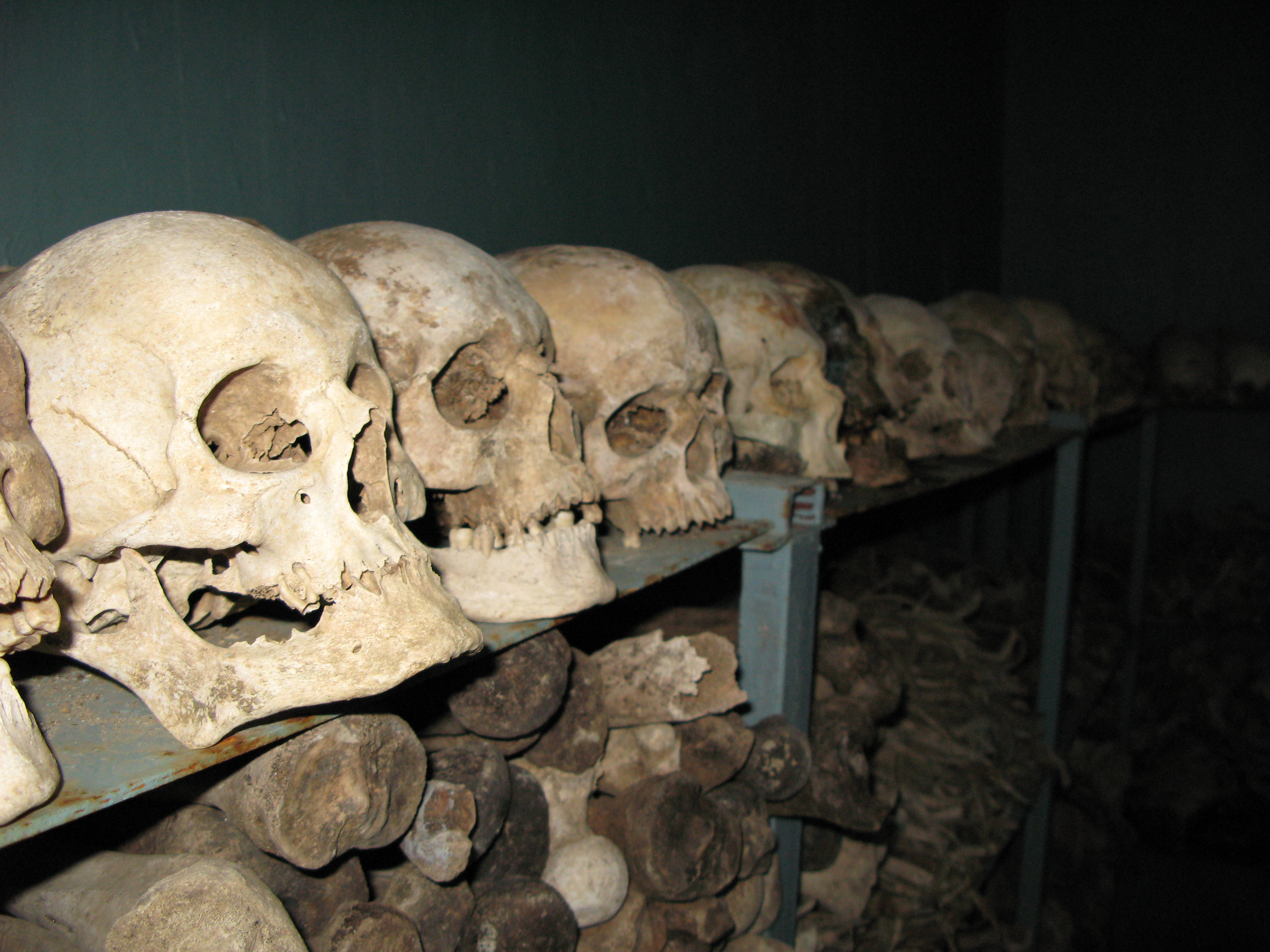
Ossuary of Serbian soldiers

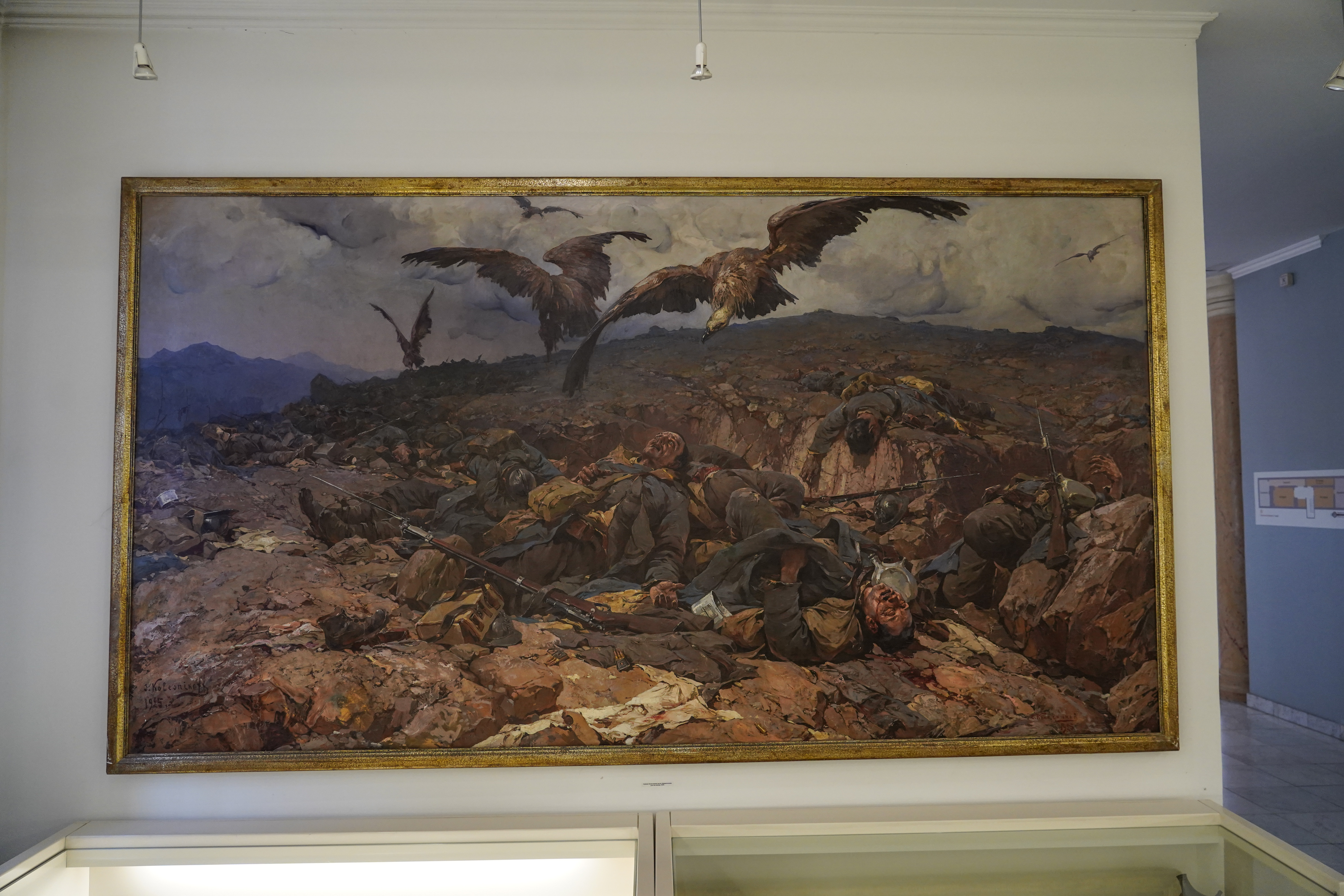
Stjepan Kolesnikov - After Kaymakchalan, 1925

== Sources ==
- Bataković, Dušan T (2005). Histoire du peuple serbe. Translated by Mihailović, Ljubomir. L'age D'homme. ISBN 9782825119587.
- Palmer, Alan (1965). The Gardeners of Salonika. Deutsch.
- Gordon-Smith, Gordon (1920). From Serbia To Yugoslavia: Serbia's Victories, Reverses And Final Triumph, 1914-1918. New York: G.P. Putnam's Sons. ISBN 9785519466608.
- Hall, Richard C (2010). Balkan breakthrough: the battle of Dobro Pole 1918. Bloomington, Ind: Indiana Univ. Press. ISBN 9780253004116.
