= Archibald Reiss =

Pioneer of criminology (1875–1929)

Rodolphe Archibald Reiss
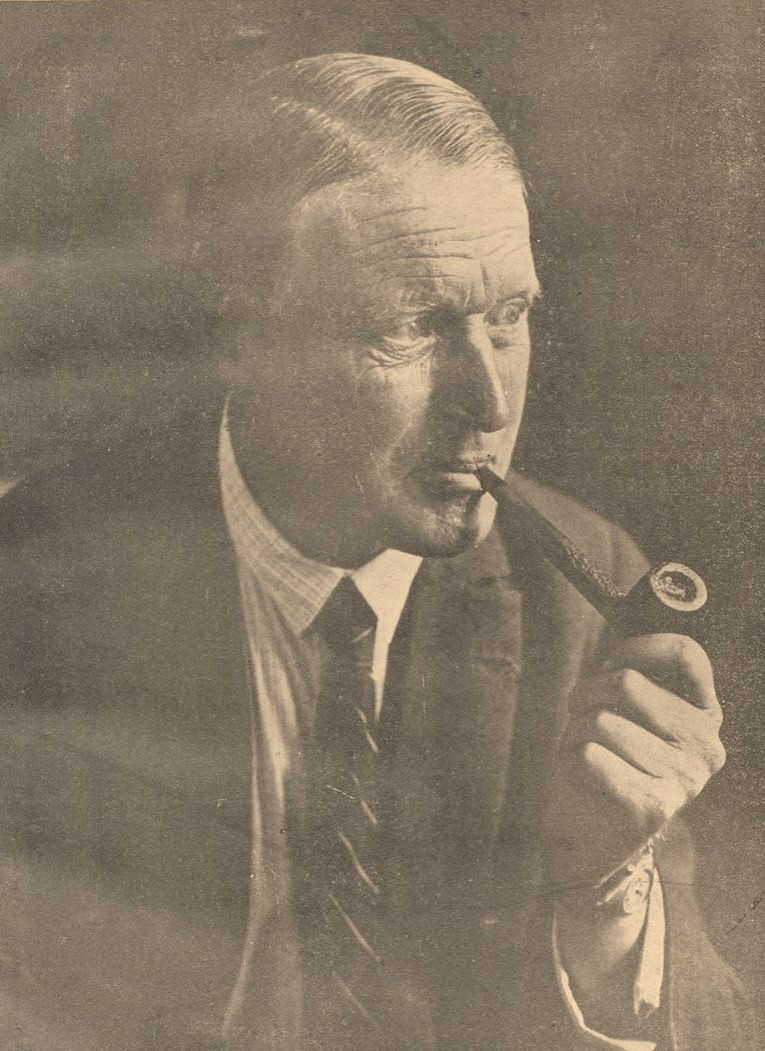
- Born: Archibald Rudolph Reiss; 8 July 1875; Hausach, Grand Duchy of Baden, German Empire
- Died: 7 August 1929 (aged 54); Belgrade, Kingdom of Serbs, Croats and Slovenes
- Resting place: Topčider Cemetery, Topčider (body); Saint Peter Church, Kajmakčalan (heart)
- Citizenship: German–Swiss
- Education: University of Lausanne
- Known for: Founding of the first academic forensic science programme and of the Institute of Forensic Science
- Scientific career
- Fields: Chemistry; Photography; Forensics
- Workplaces: University of Lausanne

Rodolphe Archibald Reiss (8 July 1875 – 7 August 1929) was a German–Swiss criminology-pioneer, forensic scientist, professor and writer who lived in Serbia after World War I.

== Early life and studies ==
The Reiss family was in agriculture and winemaking. Archibald was the eighth of ten children, son of Ferdinand Reiss, landowner and Pauline Sabine Anna Gabriele Seutter von Loetzen. After finishing highschool in Germany, he went to Switzerland for his studies. He had received a Ph.D. in chemistry at the age of 22 and was an expert in photography and forensic science. In 1906 he was appointed a professor of forensic science at the University of Lausanne. In 1909, he was the founder of the first academic forensic science programme and of the "Institut de police scientifique" (Institute of forensic science) at the University of Lausanne. He published two major books on forensic science "Photographie judiciaire" (Forensic photography), Mendel, Paris, in 1903 and the first part of his major contribution "Manuel de police scientifique. I Vols et homicides" (Handbook of forensic science I: Thefts and homicides), Payot, Lausanne and Acan, Paris, in 1911. The Institute he created celebrated its 100th anniversary in 2009 and has grown to become a major school, "Ecole des sciences criminelles", that includes forensic science, criminology and criminal law within the Faculty of Law and Criminal Justice of the University of Lausanne.

== Serbia ==
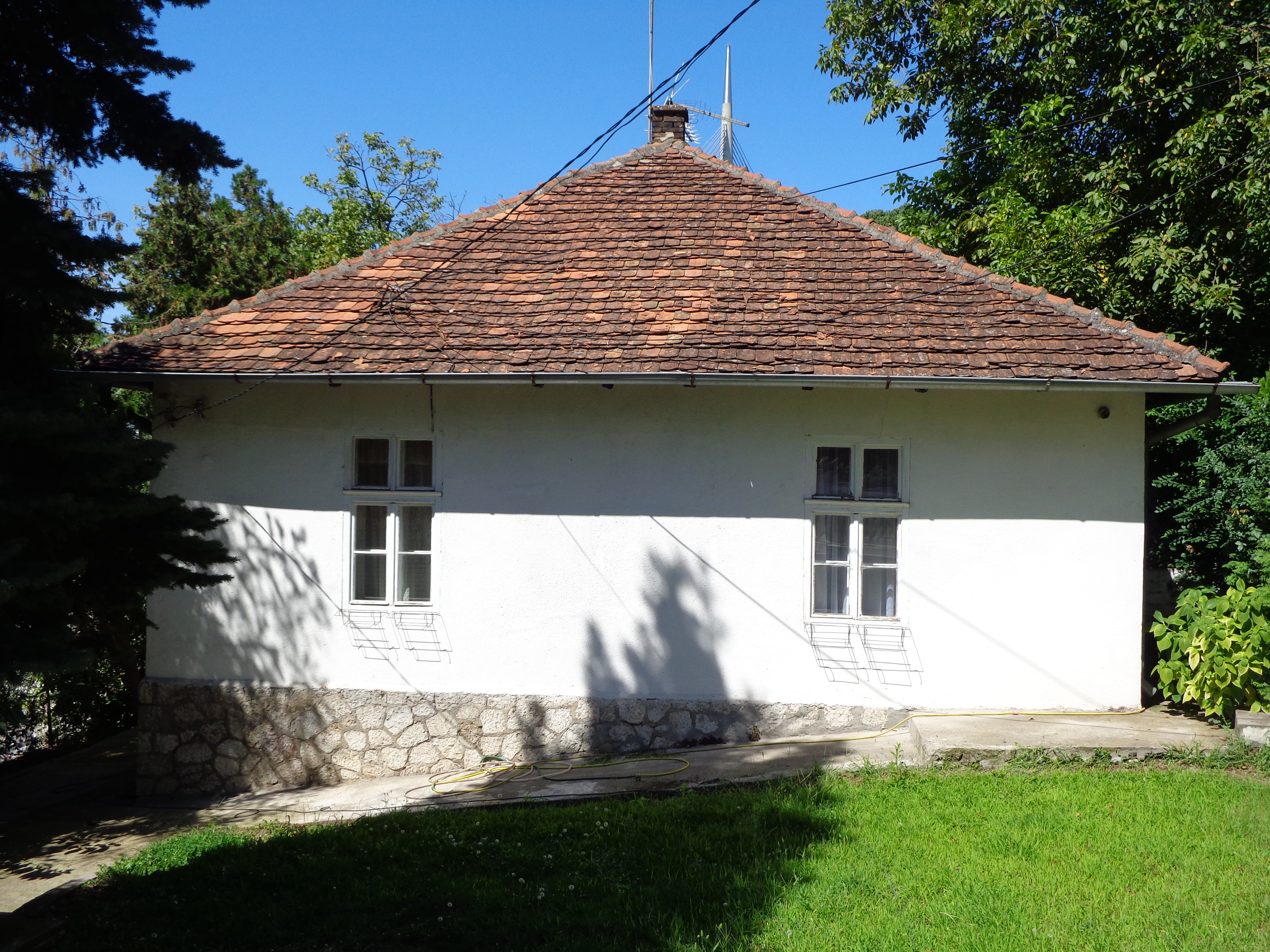
House of Archibald Reiss in Belgrade, 27 August 2020

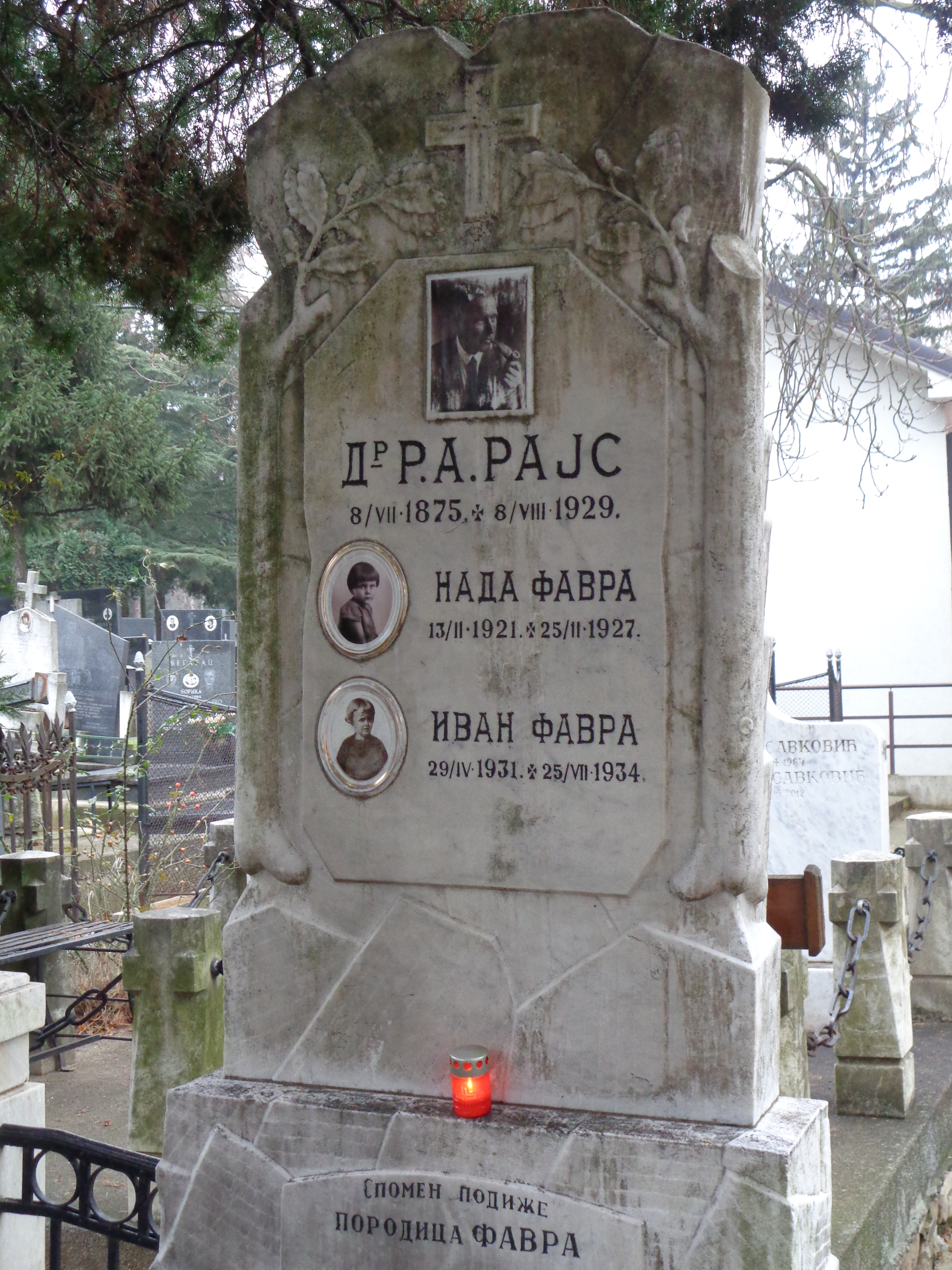
Topčider cemetery, Belgrade, 19 December 2020

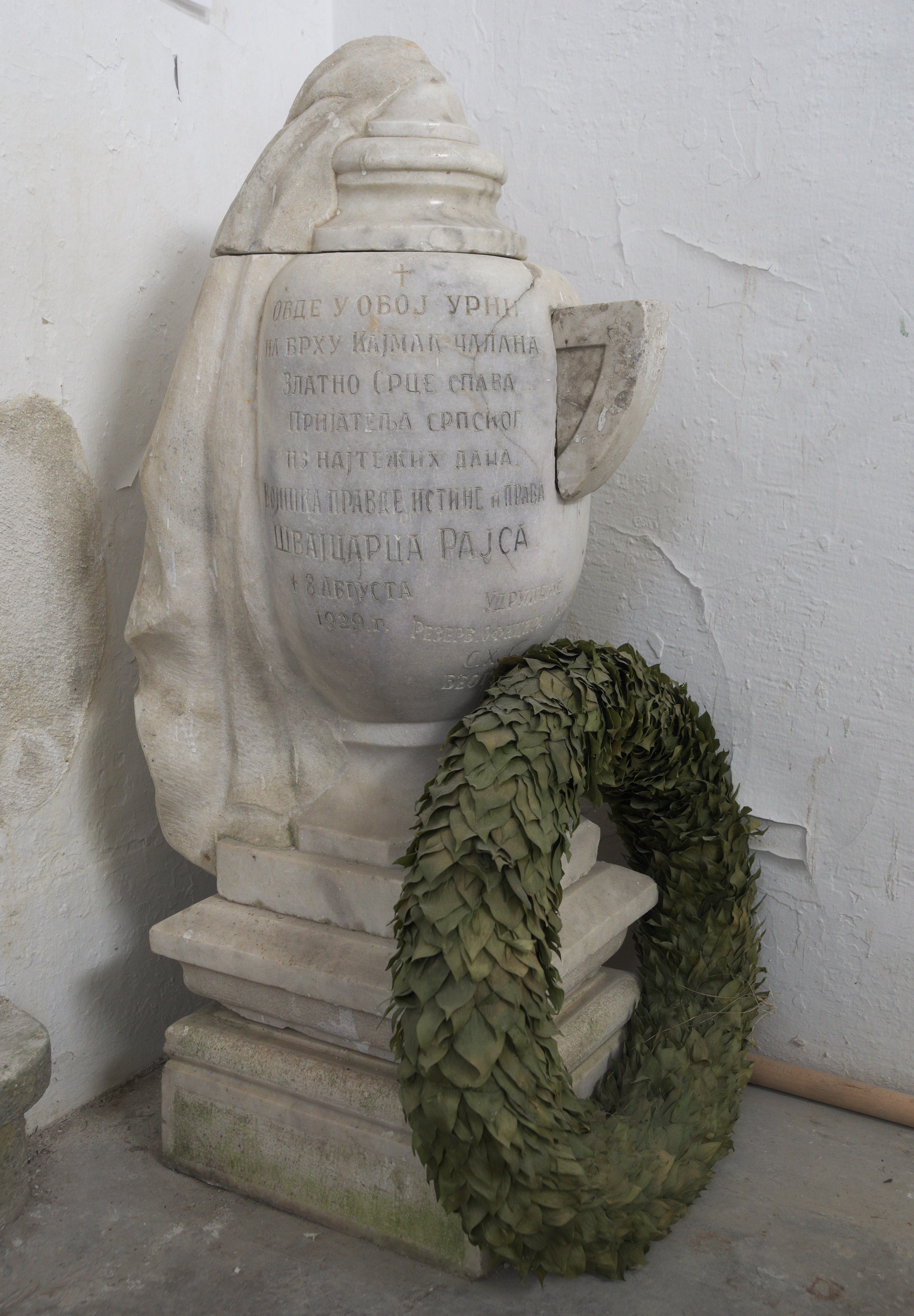
The urn containing the heart of Archibald Reiss, which was located in the Saint Peter Church on Kajmakčalan (2521m), where the Serbs defeated the Bulgarian army and re-entered their own land in World War I. The Bulgarians destroyed the urn in World War II

With the advent of World War I, Reiss was commissioned by the Serbian government to investigate atrocities committed by the invading Central Powers against Serbs. Dr. Reiss would end up extensively documenting his findings in two reports. The first, "Report upon the atrocities committed by the Austro-Hungarian Army during the first invasion of Serbia" was completed in 1915 and published in 1916, focusing on the crimes committed by the Austro-Hungarians against the Serbs during their invasion and occupation of Serbia in the first few months of World War I in 1914. The second Reiss report focused on the second round of the invasion and occupation of Serbia and crimes committed against the Serbs which began in 1915, this time by the combined forces of Austria-Hungary, Bulgaria, and Germany, but in Bulgaria the results of Reiss' investigations are rejected on the arguments that he did not take any photographs of victims of "Bulgarian atrocities", while making them for the Austro-Hungarian and German ones - moreover that he was one of the pioneers of forensic photography and the fact that he fought in the ranks of the Serbian army during the war compromised his impartiality as an expert. This second report, "Infringement of the Rules and Laws of War committed by the Austro-Bulgaro-Germans: Letters of a Criminologist on the Serbian Macedonian Front", was published in 1919. Reiss also attributes the burning of the Albanian villages in the Preševo Valley, carried out by the Serbian army during the First Balkan War and described by the then war correspondent of the "Kiev Thought" Lev Trotsky, to the Bulgarian army and presents the villages as "Serbian".

When Serbia was overrun in 1915 he joined the Serbian Army in its retreat across Albania to return with the victorious Serbian Army when it liberated Belgrade in the final days of the war. He was known as a great friend of Serbia and the Serbian people and after the war decided to stay and live in the Kingdom of Yugoslavia. Upon the invitation of the Serbian Government, he carried out an inquiry on Hungarian, German and Bulgarian atrocities in Serbia during World War I and published the reports in European papers. He was part of the Serbian Government's envoy at the Paris Peace Conference, 1919. He found propaganda postcards of the Austrian-Hungarian Army showing atrocities against Serbian people.

After the war, Reiss helped establish the first police academy in Serbia and teach forensic sciences. He was one of the founders of the Red Cross of Serbia. He became an honorary citizen of Krupanj in 1926. In 1929, Reis was in a street quarrel next to his house in Belgrade with a corrupt ex-politician neighbour, which led to his sudden death. He died before reaching the hospital.

After his death, his body was buried in the Topčider cemetery and, at his own request, his heart was buried in the Saint Peter Church on Kajmakčalan hill. The urn containing his heart was later demolished as revenge by the Bulgarians in World War II.

== Legacy ==
As a legacy to the Serbian people, he left an unpublished manuscript Ecoutez les Serbes! ("Listen Serbs!", sr. Čujte Srbi!). It was finished on 1 June 1928, and in 2004 was printed in Serbia in a large number of copies and distributed for free.

Several streets across Serbia, particularly in Vojvodina carry his name. There is a primary school in Karaburma, Belgrade named after him. In November 2013, he was nominated for the French Forensic Science Hall of Fame by the Association Québécoise de Criminalistique.

== Works ==
- La photographie judiciaire Beudel, Paris 1903.
- Manuel de police scientifique (technique). Préface de Louis Lépine. Payot, Lausanne 1911.
- Report upon the atrocities committed by the Austro-Hungarian army during the first invasion of Serbia. Simpkin, Marshall, Hamilton, Kent & Co. Ltd., London 1916.
- Les infractions aux règles et lois de la guerre. Payot, Lausanne 1918.
- "The kingdom of Serbia. Infringements of the rules and laws of war committed by the Austro-Bulgaro-Germans; letters of a criminologist on the Serbian Macedonian front". 1919.
- The Comitadji Question in Southern Serbia, London, 1924.
- Poslednje pismo Srbima: Čujte Srbi! Zlaja, Belgrad 2005, ISBN 86-84737-35-0. (posthumous)

== Bibliography ==
- Quinche, Nicolas, "Experts du crime sur les bords du Léman: naissance de la police scientifique en Suisse romande et en France". Hauterive: Editions Attinger, 2014, 352p., collection "Nouvelles Editions". ISBN 978-2-940418-82-4
- The genealogy of Rodolph Archibald Reiss can be found on "Jewish families of Frankfurt am Main".
- Quinche, Nicolas, Crime, Science et Identité. Anthologie des textes fondateurs de la criminalistique européenne (1860-1930). Genève: Slatkine, 2006, 368p.
- Quinche, Nicolas, "Les victimes, les mobiles et le modus operandi du criminaliste suisse R.-A. Reiss. Enquête sur les stratégies discursives d’un expert du crime (1906-1922)", in Revue Suisse d’Histoire, 58, no 4, décembre 2008, pp. 426–444.
- Quinche, Nicolas, "L’ascension du criminaliste Rodolphe Archibald Reiss", in Le théâtre du crime : Rodolphe A. Reiss (1875-1929). Lausanne : Presses polytechniques et universitaires romandes, 2009, pp. 231–250.
- Quinche, Nicolas, "Reiss et la Serbie : des scènes de crime aux champs de bataille, l’enquête continue", in Le théâtre du crime : Rodolphe A. Reiss (1875-1929). Lausanne : Presses polytechniques et universitaires romandes, 2009, pp. 289–306.
- Quinche, Nicolas, "Le tatouage dans l’œil du criminaliste", in Le théâtre du crime : Rodolphe A. Reiss (1875-1929). Lausanne : Presses polytechniques et universitaires romandes, 2009, pp. 307–310.
- Quinche, Nicolas, "Bombes et engins explosifs sous l’œil du criminaliste : le travail de l’expert à l’Institut de police scientifique de l’Université de Lausanne (1904-1919)", Revue historique vaudoise, 2010, pp. 175–191.
- Quinche, Nicolas, "Sur les traces du crime: de la naissance du regard indicial à l'institutionnalisation de la police scientifique et technique en Suisse et en France. L'essor de l'Institut de police scientifique de l'Université de Lausanne". Genève: Slatkine, 2011, 686p.,(Thèse de doctorat).
- Scianna, Bastian Matteo (2012). "Reporting Atrocities: Archibald Reiss in Serbia, 1914–1918". The Journal of Slavic Military Studies. 25 (4): 596–617. doi:10.1080/13518046.2012.730395.
- Rodolphe A. Reiss, pionnier de la criminalistique, publié par Jacques Mathyer, ancien directeur de l’IPSC - Lausanne.
- Report upon the atrocities committed by the Austro-Hungarian army during the first invasion of Serbia Rodolphe Archibald Reiss - Simpkin, Marshall, Hamilton, Kent & Co., Ltd., London en 1916.
- Les infractions aux règles et lois de la guerre / R.-A.Reiss. - Ed.Payot - 1918.
- Manuel de police scientifique (technique) : I. vols et homicides / R.-A. Reiss; préf. de Louis Lépine. - Ed.Payot - 1911.
- Reiss sort en 1903 La photographie judiciaire qui lui vaut sa renommée internationale.
- Rodolphe Archibald Reiss - Zdenko Levental - Editions L'Âge d'Homme -1992- www.lagedhomme.com
- Dernière lettre aux serbes - Alexandre Milinkovic - éditions Zlaja - Belgrade 2005.
- From the Austrian-Hungarian Wehrmacht to the German Wehrmacht - Herbert Gantschacher - edition ARBOS - Arnoldstein-Klagenfurt-Salzburg-Vienna 2009
