= St. Peter's Church (Kajmakčalan) =

Eastern Orthodox church in North Macedonia

- Свети Петар
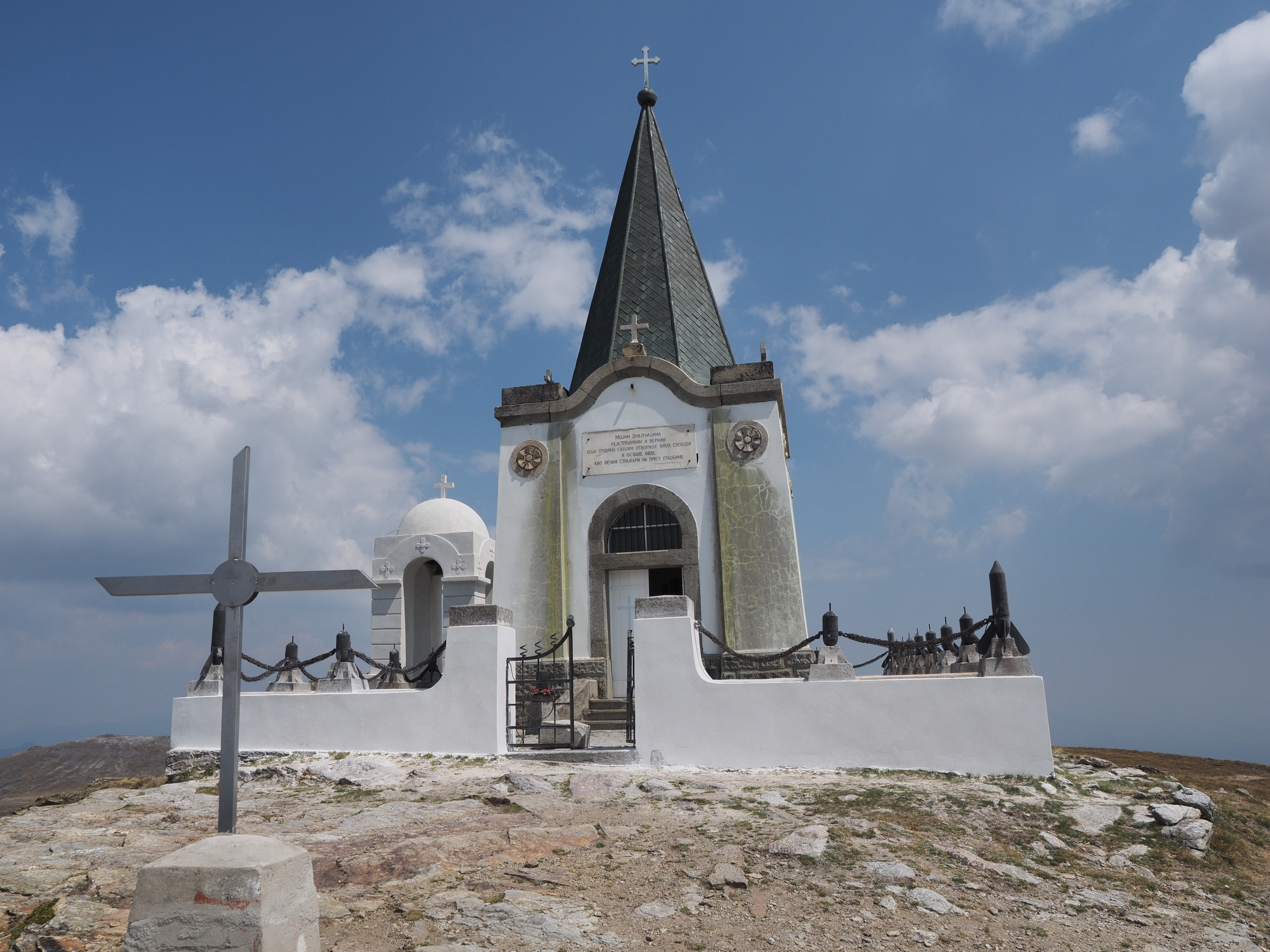
- The St. Peter's Church in 2017

- Location within North Macedonia
- 40°55′50″N 21°47′10″E
- Location: Kajmakčalan (near Skočivir), Novaci Municipality, Pelagonia
- Country: North Macedonia
- Denomination: Eastern Orthodox Church

History
- Status: Church
- Dedication: Saint Peter

Architecture
- Completed: 1928

Administration
- Metropolis: Macedonian Orthodox Church
- Diocese: Prespa and Pelagonia
- Archdeaconry: Bitola
- Parish: Kravari–Bačka

St. Peter and Paul (Macedonian: Свети Петар и Павле), known simply as St. Peter or by the name of the peak St. Elijah (Macedonian: Свети Петар, Свети Илија), is an Eastern Orthodox church on Kajmakčalan peak of the Voras Mountains, near Skočivir in North Macedonia, on the border with Greece. It is part of the Diocese of Prespa and Pelagonia of the Macedonian Orthodox Church.

== Background ==
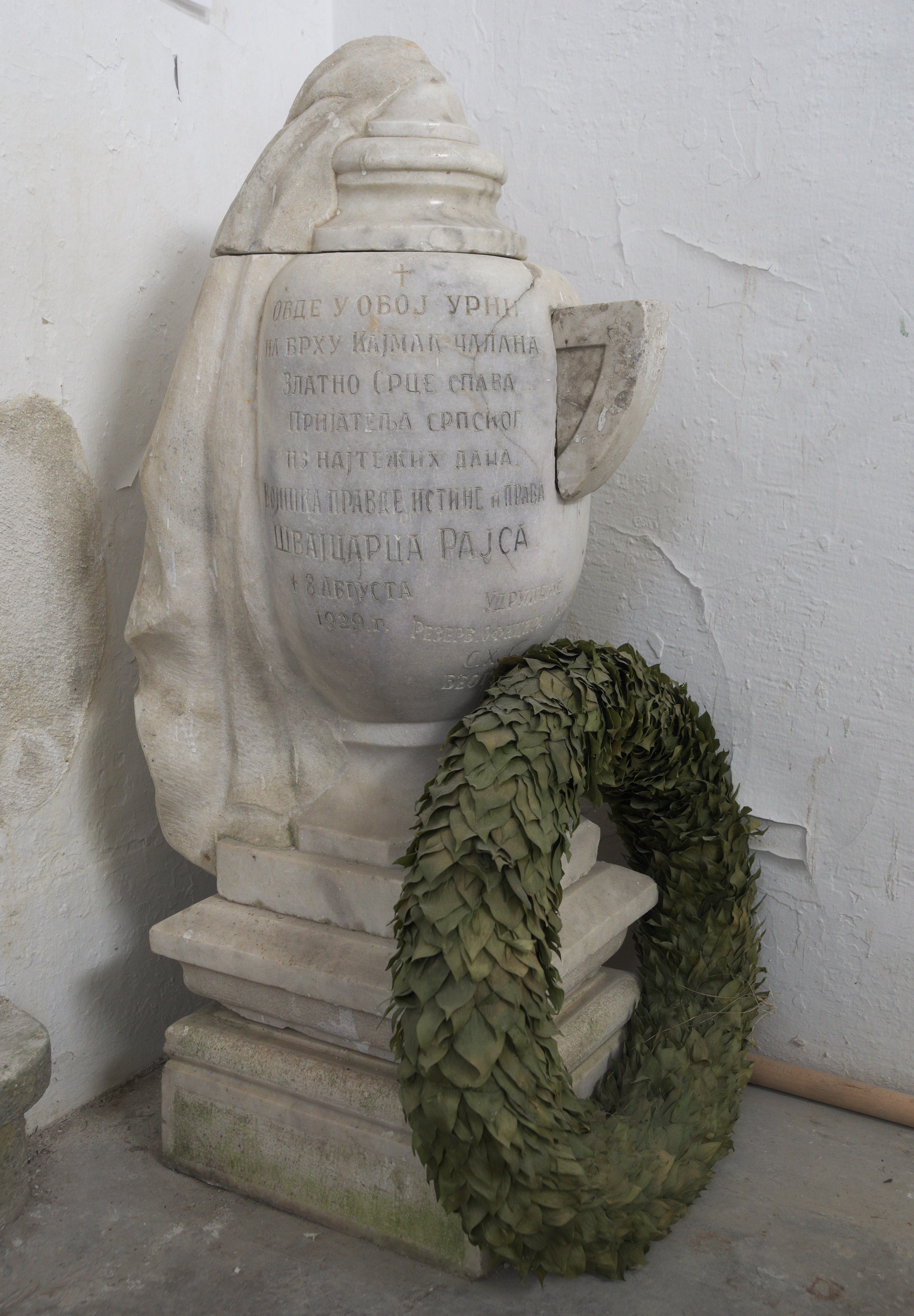
The damaged urn that contained the heart of Archibald Reiss

In the autumn of 1916, after the fierce Battle of Kaymakchalan during the Monastir offensive of World War I, the Serbian troops who had captured the peak from the Bulgarians began to build a monument to the numerous dead Serbian Army soldiers. In 1928, the monument was converted into a church-ossuary dedicated to Saint Peter. The next year, the heart of Archibald Reiss was placed in an urn at the church, at his own request; Reiss was a Swiss journalist in Serbian service who covered the battles on the Macedonian front (Salonika front), which spread across the mountain Kajmakčalan in Маcedonia. After the annexation of Vardar Macedonia to Bulgaria during World War II, Reiss' heart disappeared, but the urn was preserved.

The church has been declared a cultural monument of North Macedonia.

== See also ==
- Observation Post of the Serbian Army High Command on Kajmakčalan
