= Observation Post of the Serbian Army High Command on Kajmakčalan =

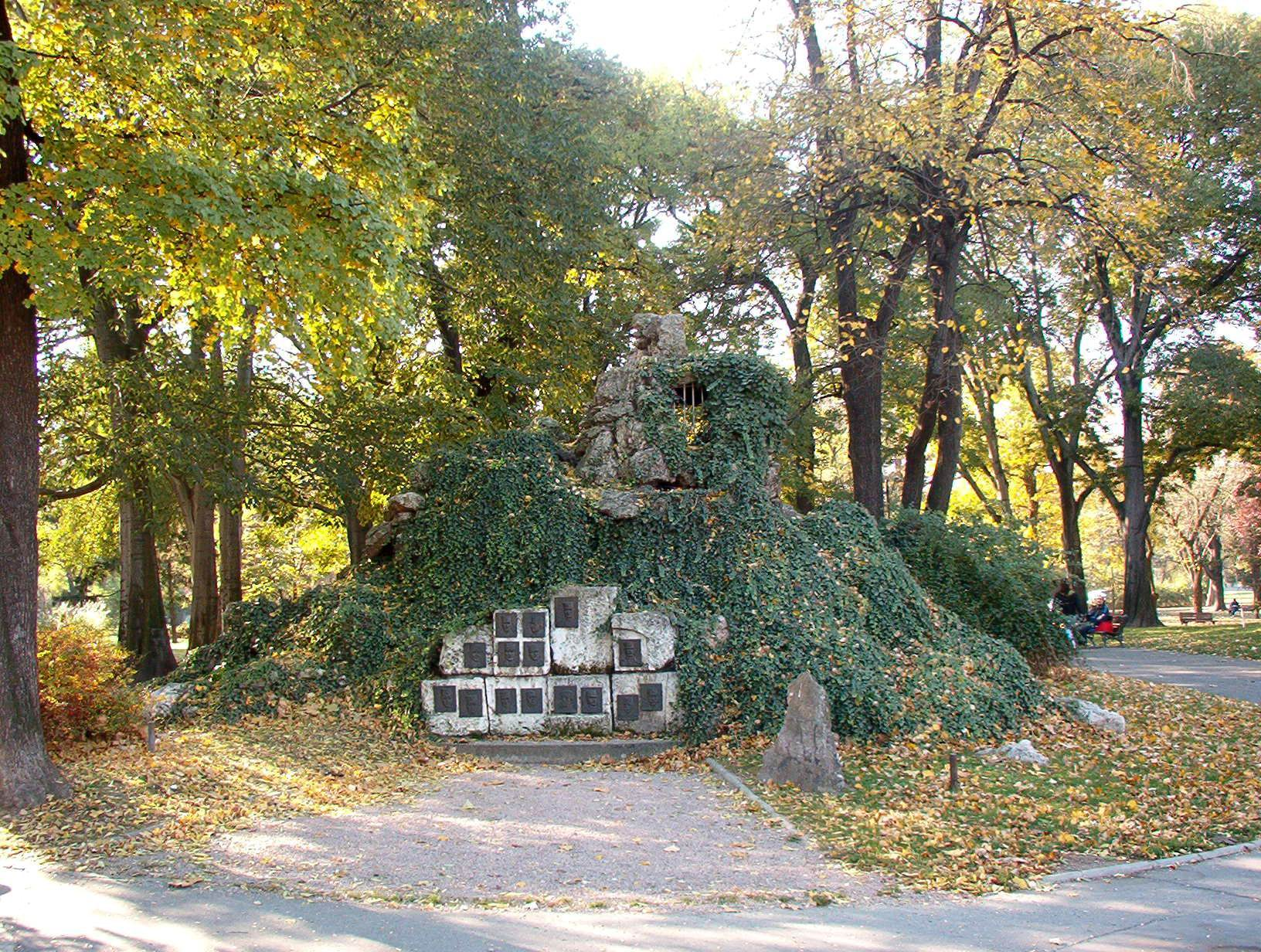
Observation Post of the Serbian Army High Command on Kajmakčalan

In World War I, after crossing over Albania, where it was annihilated, the Serbian Army recovered after a while and occupied its position at the Macedonian front (Salonika front), which spread across the mountain Kajmakčalan in Маcedonia. On the top of this mountain there was the observation post of the Serbian Army High Command. It is located in the Pioneers Park.

== Introduction ==
After the breakthrough of the Salonika front and a quick break of Serbian Army into Serbia, with the help of French cavalry and the brilliant return of the occupied territories, Serbian Army High Command decided to transport the watchtower from Kajmakčalan to Serbia. The observation post was, by the ox cart, down the traditionally poor roads, taken and reconstructed in the park near the court, that is, in the present Pioneers` Park. It is located in the very centre of Belgrade, opposite the National Assembly, diagonally from the „stone building“, that is, the building in which The Post of Serbia, Теlecom and the National Bank of Serbia are situated. In this monument there are the names of all important generals of Serbian Army, who commanded the Army in the First World War.

== History of the Pioneers Park ==
The area on which the court complex on Terazije was formed, until 1840s, was one empty and swampy land overgrown in reed. The entire area of today's Pioneers` park, along with Park Aleksandrov, between Kralja Milana Street and Kraljice Natalije Street, was purchased in the late 1830s, by Stojan Simić, one of the most influential people in Serbia, the leader of the Constitutionalist regime and the president of the State council. Simić drained the swamps, filled up and levelled the terrain, and on the odd-numbered side of the present Kralja Milana Street, he erected the house in the period from 1840–1842, which was later on named Stari konak. The repurchase of this edifice with the surrounding garden for the purpose of accommodation of the Prince Aleksandar Karađorđević's court in 1842/43 marked the forming of the first court complex in Belgrade. The integral part of the court complex is the court garden, whose forming is related to the mid-19th century and the erection of the Stari konak, which, at the time of construction, had already been surrounded by some forest trees from the earlier periods.

Princess Persida, the wife of Prince Aleksandar Karađorđević, paid attention to the cultivating of the court garden and turning it into the more representatively decorated "vernacular garden". Within the transformation of the court complex in the last decades of the 19th century, thanks to King Milan Obrenović's commitment, the decoration of the garden was continued by planting the exotic trees, some of which are preserved until today. The function of the court gardener had great influence in the garden decoration. In 1890s, that function was done by Jofan Sneider, a horticultural expert from Austria. There are not much data about the garden itself. A part of the garden spreading from the Stari dvor (Old Palace) down Dragoslava Jugovića Street, Kralja Aleksandra Boulevard and Kneza Miloša Street, up to the Former Ministry of Army, was enclosed with an over 3 metres high fence. The entrances were towards Kralja Aleksandra Boulevard and Dragoslava Jovanovića Street. One guard post was placed at the very corner of Kralja Aleksandra Boulevard and Kneza Miloša Street, and the rest of them were placed next to each gate. The fence was made of metal rods, which, until the construction of the Old Palace and setting up the new metal fence with more richly decorated gates, were gilded. The gates obtained the triumphal appearance with the prominent plastic decoration and heraldic emblems probably after the construction of the Novi dvor (New Palace) and the decoration of the court garden with the fountain between the courts. During the garden decoration, the English landscape – free style was applied in Serbia for the first time, conditioned with the existing vegetation in that area. Later on, the French-geometrical style was used particularly in the space between two courts. The court garden was divided into the "garden" faced towards Kralja Milana Street, which was a representative part of the court whole, and the „park“ in the back area, enclosed with the brick fence. In the central part of the park there was a pool with the sculpture of a naked girl holding a jug in her hand, the sculpture which was imported from Vienna, and which still stands there. Behind the Old Konak in the garden, apart from the trees from Serbia (oak, linden, maple...) some exotic types of trees were planted (black walnut, gledichia, koelreuteria, paulownia, catalpa, shcepa...), and some of them are still there. It is assumed that most of the saved trees originates from Pančić's botanical garden.

At the beginning of the 19th century, conifers of column-like shape were planted, probably thujas and blue spruces, around the entrance to the konak, as well as the thick planted conifers towards the court, and after the demolition of the Old konak in 1904, the area of the garden increased a lot. The planted trees in the garden advanced over the time, so this part of the park is nowadays rich in the most significant and the oldest vegetation. Until the Second World War the area of the court complex on Terazije was enclosed. After the reconstruction done when the Second World War ended, the former court complex was conceived as the administrative federal and republic centre. Thereto, the fence around the complex was removed, as well as the court guard building and many utility buildings. One of the most important projects of this reconstruction was orienting the former court complex towards the National Assembly building, thus realizing the idea about the forming of the representative administrative centre. The redecoration of the court garden started after the design of the architect Aleksandar Đorđević, and finished after the design of the forestry engineer Vladeta Đorđević. The former court garden was named Pioneers` park. Today's area around the Pioneers` park, which by origin belongs to the type of the residential parks, consists of three parts, different in concept: the part towards Kralja Aleksandra Boulevard, decorated in free style, the area between the courts with the fountain, and the green area in front of the Old Palace.

== The Observation Post ==
Pyramidal form made of rustically processed stone in the Pioneers` park in Belgrade, based on its widely spread belief, represents the replica of the observation post of the Serbian Army from Kajmakčalan, from the Salonika front that is, the observation post of the High Command of the Serbian Army from the Salonika front, which was located on Jelak, on the Moglen mountain, from where the regent Aleksandar Karađorđević and the commander in chief Živojin Mišić and the members of his headquarters watched the battle on the day of the breakthrough of the Salonika front, on 15 September 1918. Allegedly, the observation post was moved to Belgrade in 1928. There are other records too, which identify this structure as the imitation of the Grotto cave, built during the reign of King Milan Obrenović, which served in a decorative purpose. The third sources state that the construction was built as a belvedere, after the First World War, during the reign of King Aleksandar. The data about the existence of the observation post from the Salonika front [3] in the Pioneers` park in Belgrade appears in the daily paper Politika, from 5 November 1983. In the above-mentioned text, the author dr Milorad Tešić mentions the states which are mostly used even nowadays. In his letter to the Republic Cultural Heritage Protection Institute, professor Tešić mentioned as the source that during 1935 he was listening to the lectures „The History of Wars“, where colonel Jeremija Stanojević said that „the observation post of the High Command of Serbian Army on Jelak was soon after the First World war moved to Belgrade and that later on, during his military service, as an officer in the Guard from 1936 to 1941 he heard that information from the senior officers. Before the mentioned text by dr Milorad Tešić, there was an oral story that the mentioned structure was the park structure from Romanticism, and in 1980 it was described as the park decoration. (text written by the architect V. Đorđević in the magazine Architecture-Urbanism, no. 59, from 1980). Trying to clarify the origin of this object, and in order to find the documented material related to the observation post, The Cultural Heritage Protection Institute of the City of Belgrade conducted extensive researches during 1988/1989.

== See also ==
- St. Peter's Church (Kajmakčalan)
