= Pioneers Park, Belgrade =

Park in Belgrade, Serbia

Pioneers’ Park
- Пионирски парк
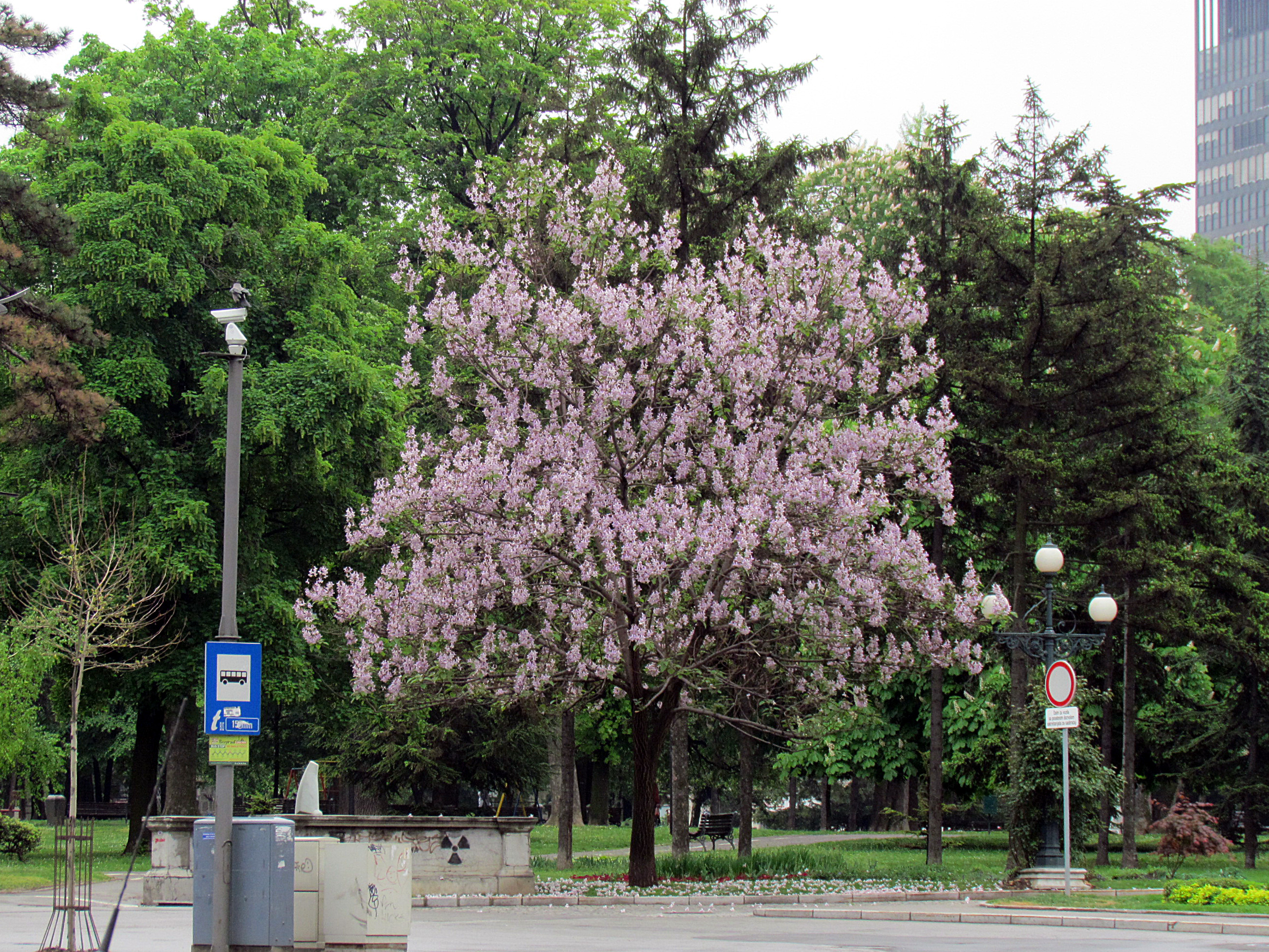
- Paulownia tree on Pioneers' Park

- Location within Belgrade
- Location: Stari Grad, Belgrade
- Coordinates: 44.8105°N 20.4644°E
- Opened: 1944
- Status: Open

Pioneers’ Park (Serbian: Пионирски парк) is a park in Belgrade, the capital of Serbia. Developed from the royal garden, which itself was a successor of a much older garden, it is today one of the central city parks. It is open to the public since 1944. The park has been declared a botanical natural monument.

From 6 March 2025 to 25 October 2026, the park was fenced off and closed to the public by the police. It has been used as camp of the pro-government protesters who oppose Serbian anti-corruption protests and students' blockades. During that period, the park was heavily damaged and devastated.

== Location ==
The park is located in the municipality of Stari Grad. It is bounded by the streets of Bulevar Kralja Aleksandra on the northeast, Kneza Miloša on the southeast, Kralja Milana on the west and Dragoslava Jovanovića on the north, occupying majority of the area in the block formed by these streets. Being located in central Belgrade, it is surrounded by important city buildings and localities: House of the National Assembly, Nikola Pašić Square, Dom Sindikata on the north, former royal courts of Stari Dvor and Novi Dvor, Andrićev Venac, Terazije on the west, London on the southwest, Krunski Venac on the south, Tašmajdan on the east.

Though they are intersected with the streets, Pioneers’ Park forms a larger green sector with the surrounding parks and green areas: Tašmajdan Park (east), Park at the National Assembly (north), Andrićev Venac (west) and Park Aleksandrov (further west, across the Kralja Milana). Easternmost point of the park, at the crossroad of the Bulevar Kralja Aleksandra, Kneza Miloša and Takovska streets, it the tripoint of the municipalities Vračar, Stari Grad and Palilula.

== History ==
=== Origin ===
The garden already existed at least in the early 18th century. During the Austrian occupation of northern Serbia 1717-39, several hospitals were established in Belgrade, including the Great Military Hospital. Based on the Austrian plans, the hospital was set outside of the Belgrade Fortress ("Danubian" or "German Belgrade"), in the Serbian part of the city. As shown on the map of Belgrade by Nicolas François de Spar, the Tsarigrad Road began at the Württemberg Gate (Stambol Gate), at the modern Republic Square, and headed towards "Marko's Cemetery" in Tašmajdan. The hospital was situated on the road's right side, where the modern Stari Dvor is located. Behind the hospital there was a large garden, predecessor of the modern park, and further behind it, across the road was the military cemetery. Later "Marko's Market" developed on the spot and today it is the area surrounding the House of the National Assembly. After Austria lost the Austro-Turkish War of 1737–1739, the northern Serbia, including Belgrade, was returned to the Turks. One of the provisions of the 1739 Treaty of Belgrade stated that Austria had to demolish all the fortifications and military and civilian buildings it has constructed during the occupation. Many Baroque buildings were demolished. However, Austria did not demolish the buildings outside of the fortress walls, including the Great Military Hospital, which, albeit as a ruin, survived until the next Austrian occupation in 1788.

=== Royal Garden ===
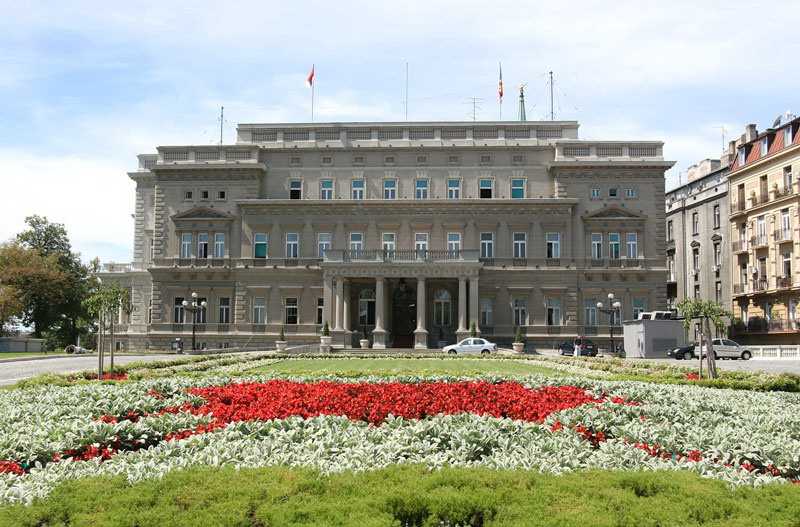
Stari Dvor

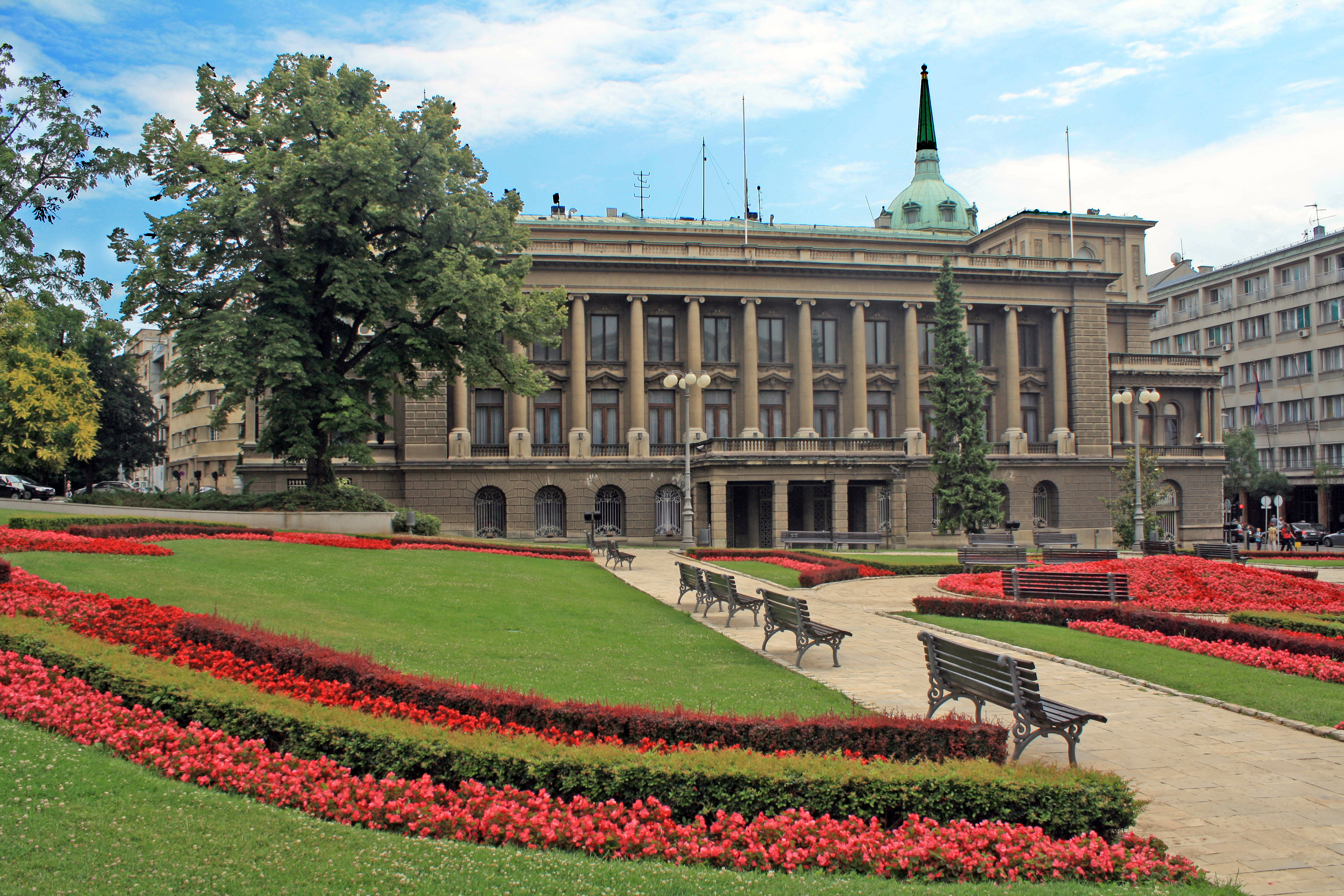
Novi Dvor

Stojan Simić, a politician and a businessman, member of the influential Simić family, notable in the 19th century Serbia both in politics and culture, purchased the lot in the late 1830s. It was a piece of marshland which encompassed the modern features of Stari Dvor, Pioneers’ Park and Park Aleksandrov. Simić drained the marsh, filled and leveled the terrain and on the northern side of the modern Kralja Milana street constructed a house 1840–42. The edifice became known as the Old Konak. Development of the first Serbian royal compound began in 1843–43, when the ruling prince Alexander Karađorđević purchased the konak with the surrounding garden. Princess Persida, the wife of Prince Aleksandar, paid attention to the cultivating of the court garden and turning it into the more representatively decorated "vernacular garden". Instigated by King Milan, the palace itself was built between 1882 and 1884, according to the design of Aleksandar Bugarski, in the style of academism of the 19th century. Today, the building serves as a Belgrade City Hall.

King Milan (reigned 1868–89) invested much time and funding into the garden, more than any other ruler. Even today some of the plants from that period survive. British traveler Herbert Vivian (1865–1940) visited the court and the garden in 1896 and described it as having the "Dutch garden, beautiful like those on the estate of Henry VIII, outside of London". The garden had decorative and ornamental plants, cricket field, tennis court, bowling alley and musical pavilion. Not many historical records on the garden survived, though. Due to the construction of two palaces next to it, and constant change of the ruling dynasties, the Karađorđević and the Obrenović, chronicles were mostly concentrated on the rulers and the buildings, not the garden.

King Milan decorated the garden by planting the exotic trees. The function of the court gardener had great influence in the garden decoration. In 1890s, that function was done by Johan Sneider, a horticultural expert from Austria. A part of the garden spreading from the Stari Dvor down Dragoslava Jovanovića, Bulevar Kralja Aleksandra and Kneza Miloša, up to the former Ministry of Army, was enclosed with an over 3 m (9.8 ft) high fence. The entrances were towards Kralja Aleksandra Boulevard and Dragoslava Jovanovića. One guard post was placed at the very corner of Kralja Aleksandra and Kneza Miloša, and the rest of them were placed next to each gate. The fence was made of metal rods, which, until the construction of the Stari Dvor and setting up the new metal fence with more richly decorated gates, were gilded. The gates obtained the triumphal appearance with the prominent plastic decoration and heraldic emblems probably after the construction of the Novi Dvor and the decoration of the court garden with the fountain between the courts. During the garden decoration, the English landscape – free style was applied in Serbia for the first time, conditioned with the existing vegetation in that area. Later on, the French-geometrical style was used particularly in the space between two courts. The court garden was divided into the "garden" faced towards Kralja Milana, which was a representative part of the court whole, and the "park" in the back area, enclosed with the brick fence. In the central part of the park there was a pool with the sculpture of a naked girl holding a jug in her hand, the sculpture which was imported from Vienna, and which still stands there. Behind the Old Konak in the garden, apart from the trees from Serbia (oak, linden, maple) some exotic types of trees were planted (black walnut, honey locust, koelreuteria, paulownia, catalpa). It is assumed that most of the saved trees originates from Josif Pančić's botanical garden.

At the beginning of the 19th century, conifers of column-like shape were planted, probably thujas and blue spruces, around the entrance to the konak, as well as the thick planted conifers towards the court, and after the demolition of the Old Konak in 1904, the area of the garden increased a lot. The planted trees in the garden advanced over the time, so this part of the park is nowadays rich in the most significant and the oldest vegetation. Until the World War II the area of the court complex on Terazije was enclosed.

The construction of the new royal palace, Novi Dvor, for Crown Prince Alexander, designed by Stojan Titelbah (1877–1916), began in 1911 on the outskirts of the garden. The construction was completed in 1914, on the eve of World War I. The building suffered substantial damage during the war and was thoroughly rebuilt in 1919–22 under the supervision of a special commission which also oversaw the renovation of the Stari Dvor. The Novi Dvor became the official royal residence in June 1922, when King Alexander I of Yugoslavia and Queen Maria moved in. Their sons, princes Peter, Andrew and Tomislav often played war in the garden on the object believed to be an Observation Post of the Serbian Army High Command on Kajmakčalan. The authenticity of the Observation Post cannot be confirmed, just like the popular tale of it being made from the real stones brought from the Kajmakčalan mountain in 1928. The Royal Family later moved to Beli Dvor on Dedinje and the building was adapted into the Museum of Prince Paul, later the National Museum in Belgrade, until 1948. Today, the building is the seat of the President of Serbia.

Soviet intelligence agent Mustafa Golubić was arrested by the German occupational forces in 1941. He was apparently the preferred leader of the Communist Party of Yugoslavia by Stalin, as opposed to the present leader Josip Broz Tito. It is believed that the party tipped off Golubić to the Germans, who received an "anonymous" tip on his whereabouts. He was ruthlessly tortured ("his all bones were broken") and carried by the German soldiers on the canvas into the Royal Garden. He was in such a bad shape, that the firing squad had to execute him while he was seated in the chair. Golubić was buried in the garden. After Red Army participated in the liberation of Belgrade in October 1944, Soviet soldiers discovered his grave, exhumed his remains which were reinterred in Moscow, with heroic honors.

=== After World War II ===
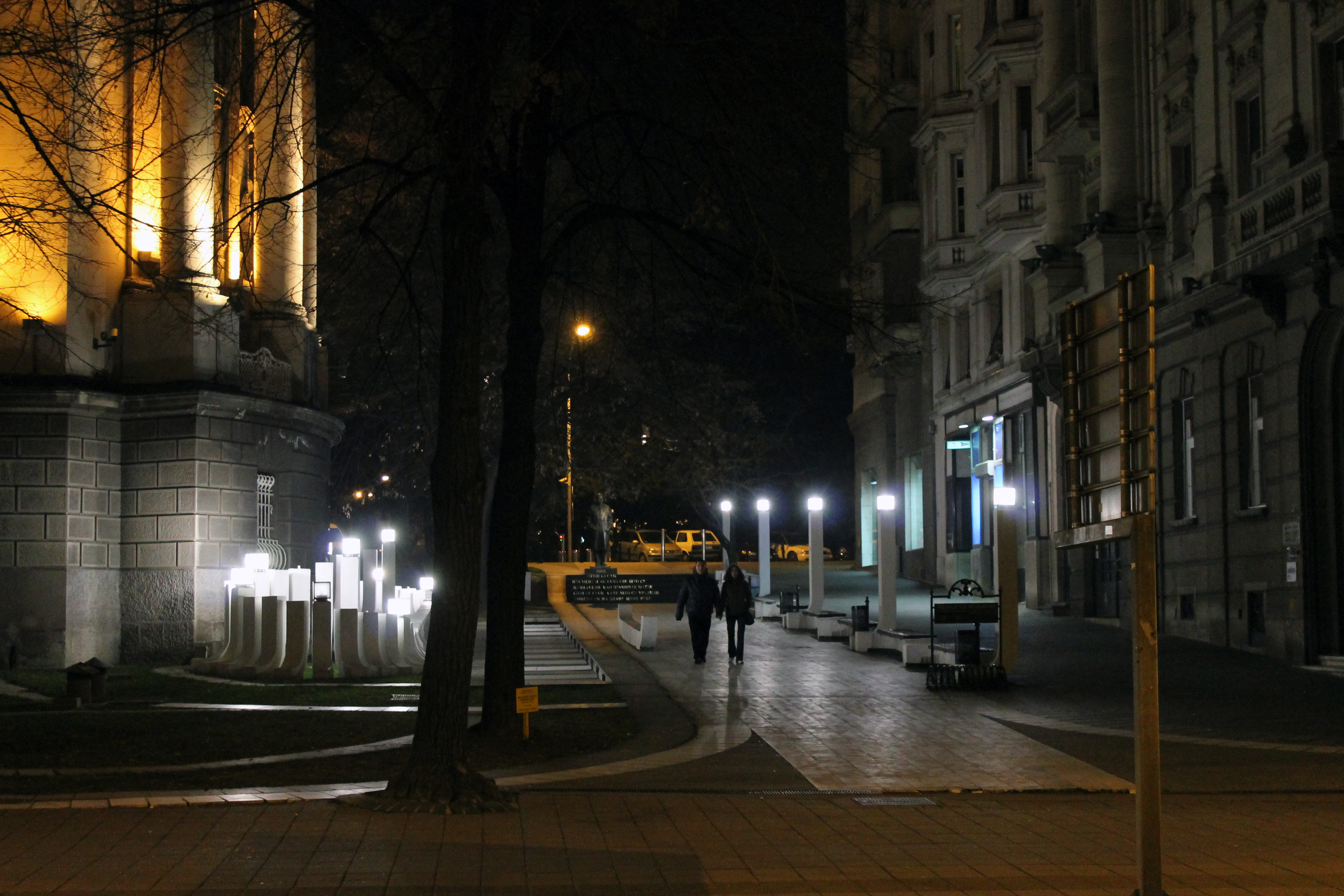
Andrićev Venac, with the park in the back

The new Communist authorities removed the fence in 1944, making the garden public and naming it the Pioneers Park. After the reconstruction done when the Second World War ended, the former court complex was conceived as the administrative federal and republic center, so the court guard building and many utility buildings were demolished. One of the most important projects of this reconstruction was orienting the former court complex towards the National Assembly building, thus realizing the idea about the forming of the representative administrative centre. The redecoration of the court garden started after the design of the architect Aleksandar Đorđević, and finished after the design of the forestry engineer Vladeta Đorđević.

An area between the park and the Kralja Milana street, east of the Novi Dvor, was arranged as an modernist, artistic promenade with an artificial stream and named after the writer Ivo Andrić, Nobel laureate, Andrićev Venac. The apartment facing the park, where the writer lived with his wife, is now Ivo Andrić Museum. The monument to Ivo Andrić was erected on the promenade.

Today, the park covers an area of 3.6 ha (8.9 acres), of which 2 ha (4.9 acres) is forested. The area of the park, which by origin belongs to the type of the residential parks, consists of three parts, different in concept: the part towards Bulevar Kralja Aleksandra decorated in free style, the area between the courts with the fountain, and the green, flower area in front of the Stari Dvor. Under the flower area and the driveway to the city hall an underground garage was built. It has 455 parking spots on three levels and was open on 1 April 2005. It was fully renovated and expanded to 461 parking spots in February 2019.

In 2009 the park was declared a botanical natural monument. The park was in a fairly bad shape in the 2000s. In 2008 first plans for its reconstructions were made, but nothing has been done until 2017, when on 20 September the reconstruction began.

In the 2020s, there were suggestions that monument to King Alexander I Obrenović, placed in the late 2004 along the boulevard bearing his name at the square between the Zvezdara municipal building and the King Alexander I Students’ Residence, should be relocated to the location of the Old Konak, which was demolished in 1904, where the king was assassinated.

==== 2025–2026 protests ====
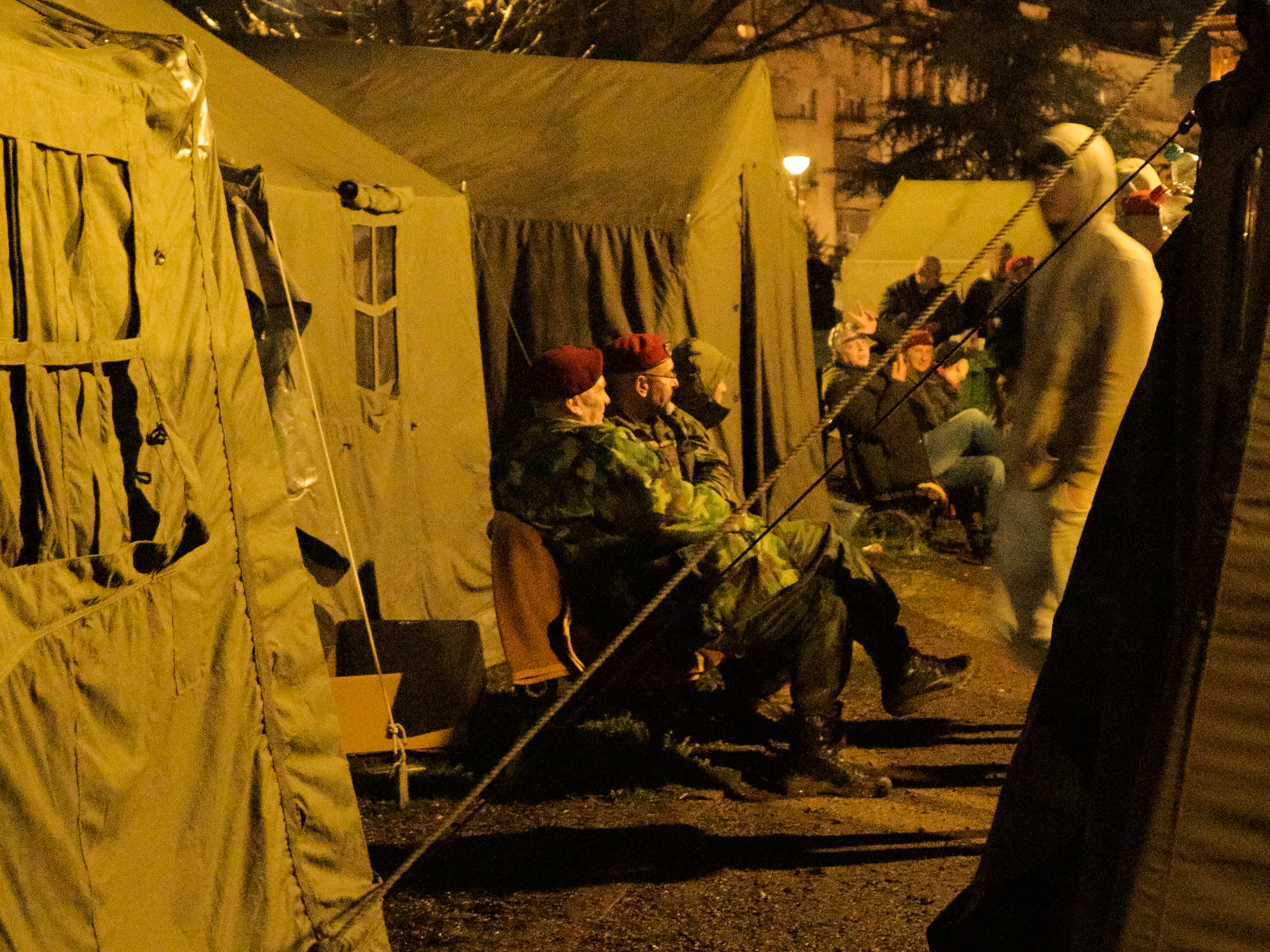
Veterans of the Special Operations Unit camping in the park (11 March 2025)

During the 2024–2026 Serbian anti-corruption protests, anti-government protesters announced a large protest meeting in Belgrade for 15 March 2025. In response, on 6 March, a group of pro-government activists calling themselves "Students 2.0" established a tent camp in the Pioneers Park, calling for an end to the blockades. Although presenting themselves as "students", media reports described most participants as adult men, employees of public companies, and veterans of the disbanded Special Operations Unit. According to investigative reporting, some of the campers were financially compensated and allegedly recruited through channels linked to the ruling Serbian Progressive Party (SNS).

Initially, the park remained open to the public, and journalists were able to record the camp. On the eve of the 15 March protest, however, the park was fenced off and surrounded by a number of tractors, and police began restricting entry, including for journalists. During this period, the camp was visited by several government officials who publicly expressed support, including President Aleksandar Vučić, Prime Minister Đuro Macut, and SNS president Miloš Vučević. After 15 March, most of the campers reportedly left, though a smaller group remained, and police continued to restrict access to the park. On 15 April, the camp expanded when tents were placed on the street between Pioneers Park and the Parliament building.

Both the original and expanded camps have been described by media outlets using the pejorative term "Ćaciland". Environmental damage to the park has been reported during the existence of the camp. Outlets noted that much of the grass and flowers had been destroyed and that some trees were damaged. The Institute for Nature Protection stated it had not intervened, citing lack of access and absence of inspection reports.

Despite calls by civic groups to reopen it, the park remained fenced off with police denying entrance to the public. The camp was abandoned by its occupants and the police on 25 October 2026, just minutes after Vučić conceded the 2026 parliamentary election, and ordinary citizens were free to enter the park for the first time since March 2025.

== Characteristics ==
There are rare and protected plant species in the park, like European nettle tree and Ginkgo biloba. The park is home to 2 species of bats.

Apart from the fountain "Girl with the jug" and the Kajmakčalan observation post, the park also contains several artistic sculptures, a drinking fountain, and a monument to Nadežda Petrović.

At some point, "Zelenilo" city-owned company, which administers the green areas, began marking its anniversaries by planting rare and uncommon species from all over the world in the park. Thus the park became an oasis of exotic plants, always planted by some celebrity. In October 2021, a seedling of Persian ironwood was planted by Nenad Bjeković.

== Gallery ==
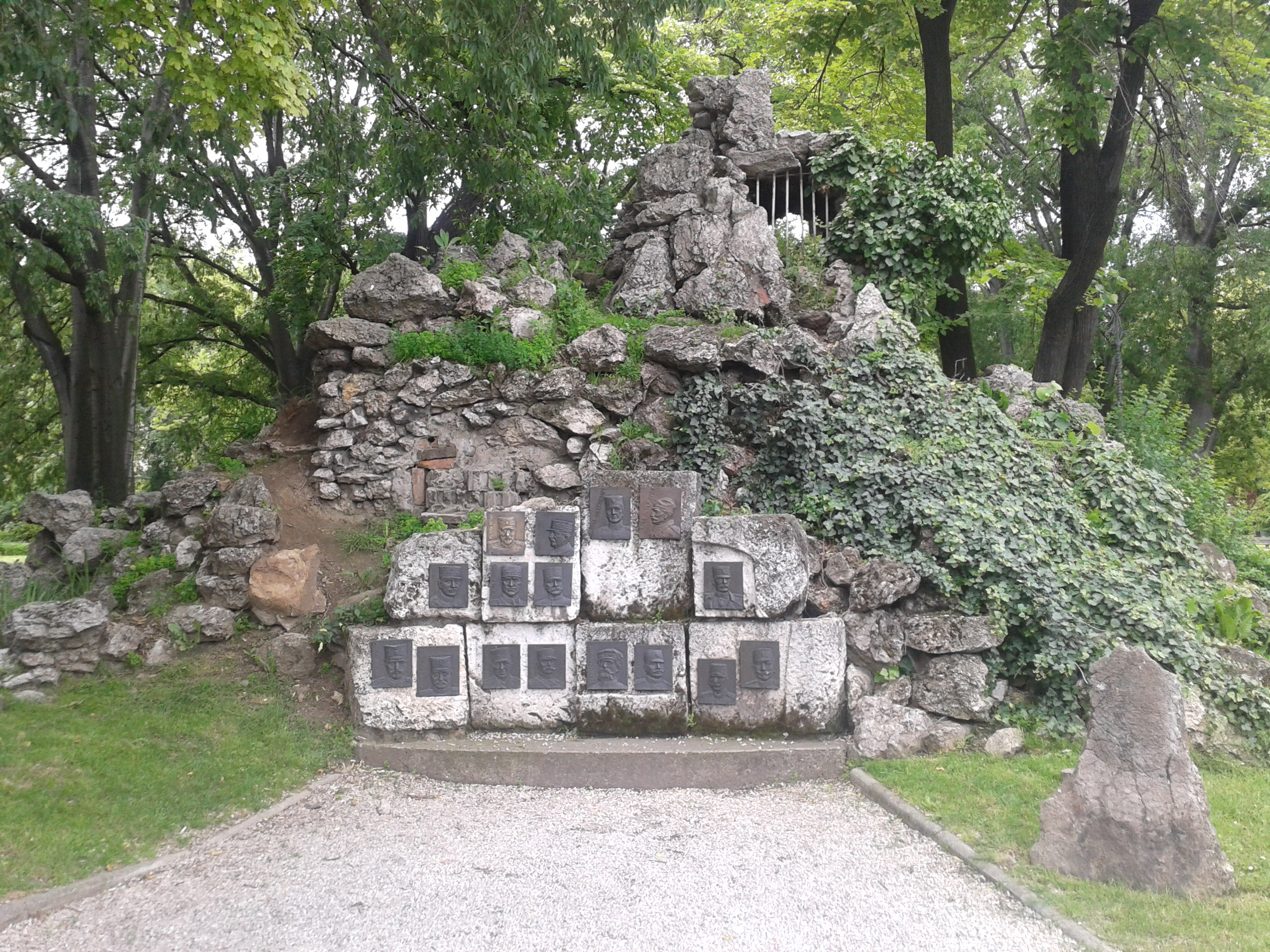
Observation Post of the Serbian Army High Command on Kajmakčalan

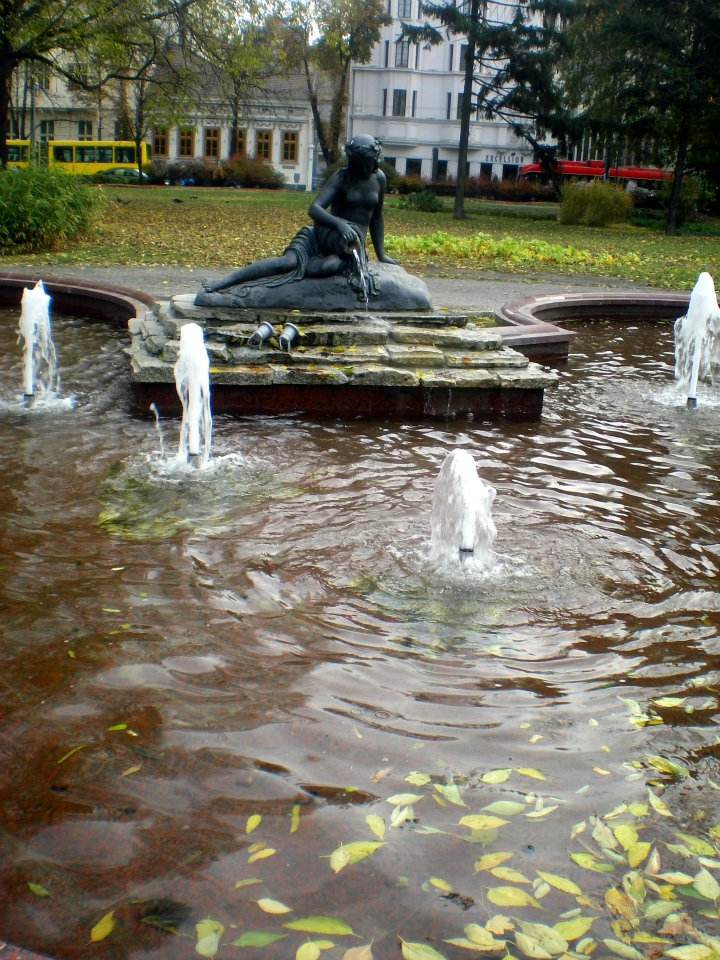
The fountain "Girl with the jug"

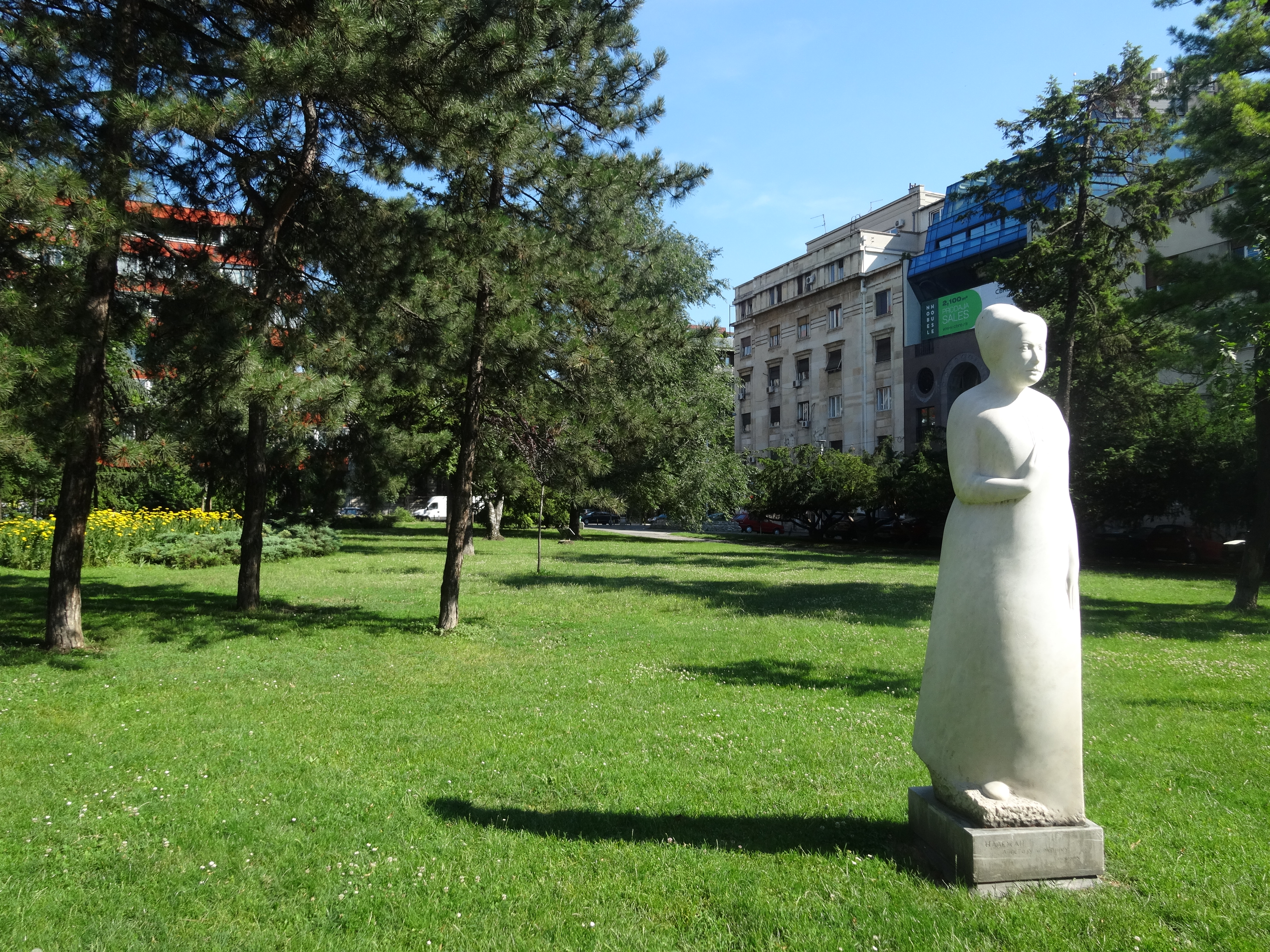
Monument to Nadežda Petrović

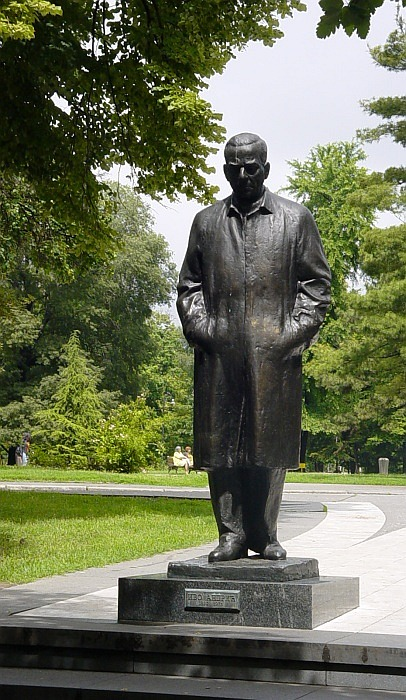
Monument to Ivo Andrić
