= Kajmakčalan =

Mountain in Greece and North Macedonia

- Voras
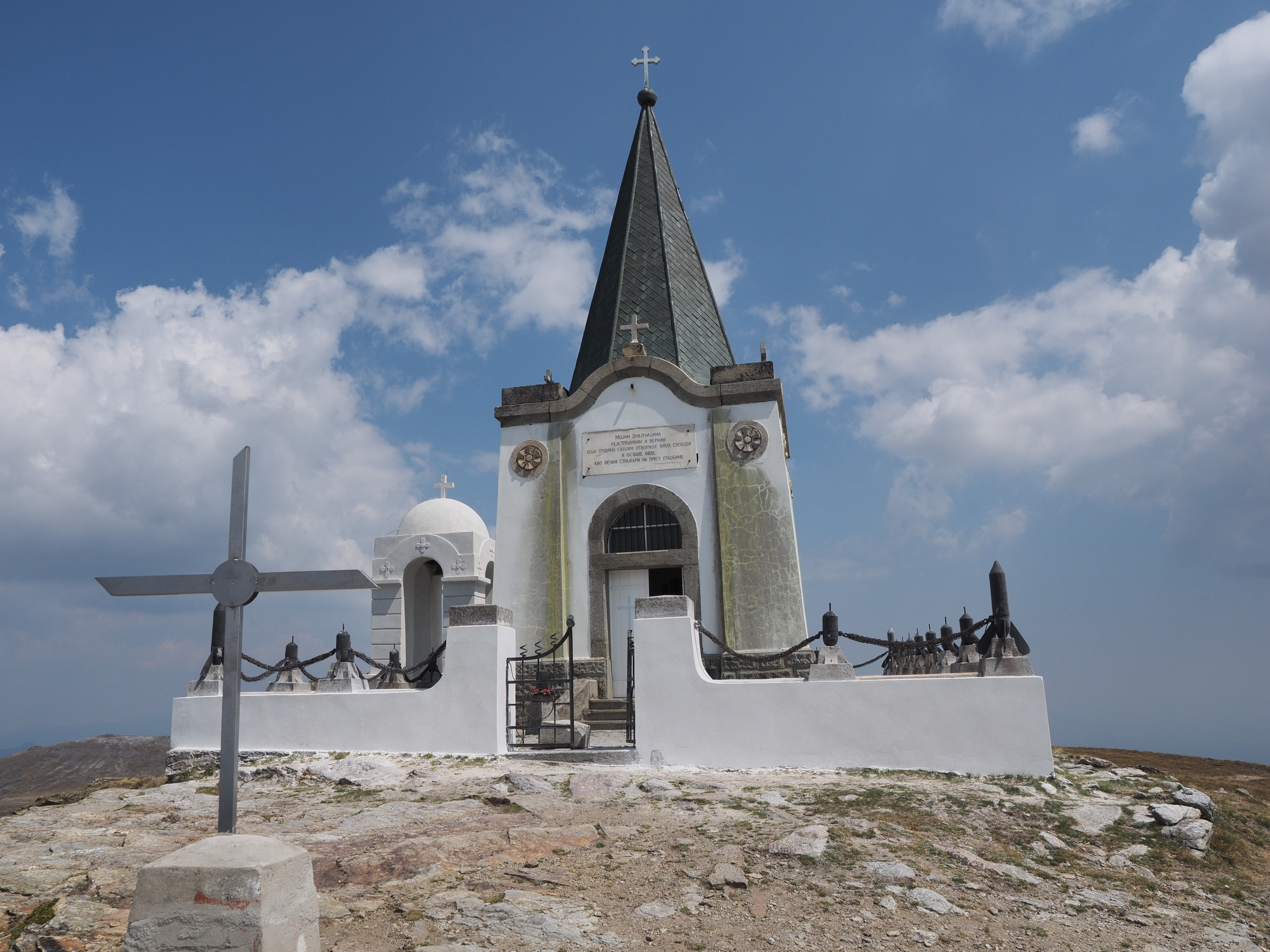
- The Serbian-built St. Peter's Orthodox church on the peak of Kajmakčalan

Highest point
- Elevation: 2,521 m (8,271 ft)
- Prominence: 1,758 m (5,768 ft)
- Listing: Ultra
- Coordinates: 40°55′52″N 21°47′21″E

Geography
- Location within Greece
- Location: Greece–North Macedonia border
- Parent range: Voras Mountains

Kajmakčalan (Kaimakchalan), Kaimaki, Kaimaktsalan or Voras (Greek: Καϊμακτσαλάν or Καϊμάκι or Βόρας, Macedonian: Каjмакчалан, romanized: Kajmakčalan), is a mountain on the border between Greece and North Macedonia. It is the southernmost and highest peak, 2,521 metres (8,271 ft), of a range known in Greek as the Voras Mountains and in Macedonian as Nidže. In terms of prominence, the Kaimaktsalan summit rises 1,758 metres above its surroundings. The frontier between the two countries runs across the summit. It is the third-highest peak in Greece after Mytikas and Smolikas and the fifth-highest in North Macedonia.

== Etymology ==
The word "Kajmakčalan" is of Ottoman Turkish origin and inspired by its white, snowy peak: kaymakçalan means 'kaymak-like'. "Kaymak" in Turkish refers to a dairy product similar to clotted cream.

== Geology ==
The peak consists of granite, gneiss and mica.

== Climate ==
Kajmakčalan has a subarctic climate (Dsc) with short, cool summers and long, cold winters.

Climate data for Kaimaktsalan Ski Center, Greece 2090 m a.s.l (2008-2023)
Month	Jan	Feb	Mar	Apr	May	Jun	Jul	Aug	Sep	Oct	Nov	Dec	Year
Record high °C (°F)	9.4 (48.9)	11.0 (51.8)	10.3 (50.5)	18.0 (64.4)	21.3 (70.3)	23.1 (73.6)	25.5 (77.9)	24.6 (76.3)	21.3 (70.3)	17.4 (63.3)	14.1 (57.4)	11.3 (52.3)	25.5 (77.9)
Mean daily maximum °C (°F)	−1.8 (28.8)	−1.0 (30.2)	0.8 (33.4)	4.4 (39.9)	9.5 (49.1)	13.6 (56.5)	16.7 (62.1)	16.6 (61.9)	12.4 (54.3)	7.9 (46.2)	4.6 (40.3)	0.1 (32.2)	7.0 (44.6)
Daily mean °C (°F)	−4.2 (24.4)	−3.6 (25.5)	−1.9 (28.6)	1.8 (35.2)	6.5 (43.7)	10.5 (50.9)	13.2 (55.8)	13.1 (55.6)	9.3 (48.7)	5.1 (41.2)	2.1 (35.8)	−2.3 (27.9)	4.1 (39.4)
Mean daily minimum °C (°F)	−6.6 (20.1)	−6.2 (20.8)	−4.5 (23.9)	−0.9 (30.4)	3.5 (38.3)	7.3 (45.1)	9.6 (49.3)	9.6 (49.3)	6.2 (43.2)	2.3 (36.1)	−0.5 (31.1)	−4.7 (23.5)	1.3 (34.3)
Record low °C (°F)	−20.8 (−5.4)	−20.0 (−4.0)	−19.1 (−2.4)	−11.3 (11.7)	−4.6 (23.7)	−0.6 (30.9)	2.6 (36.7)	1.7 (35.1)	−4.5 (23.9)	−10.0 (14.0)	−12.1 (10.2)	−16.9 (1.6)	−20.8 (−5.4)
Average precipitation mm (inches)	89.7 (3.53)	57.6 (2.27)	58.8 (2.31)	63.5 (2.50)	99.2 (3.91)	90.6 (3.57)	32.6 (1.28)	59.6 (2.35)	74.6 (2.94)	89.0 (3.50)	113.1 (4.45)	88.4 (3.48)	916.7 (36.09)
Average precipitation days (≥ 1.0 mm)	9.1	8.4	8.9	9.4	10.5	9.4	5.4	5.9	8.1	6.7	7.1	8.6	97.4
Source 1: National Observatory of Athens Monthly Bulletins (Feb 2008 - Sep 2023)
Source 2: Kaimaktsalan N.O.A station and World Meteorological Organization

== History ==
During World War I, in September 1916, the Battle of Kaymakchalan between Serbian and Bulgarian troops took place at Kajmakčalan and around the adjacent peaks, resulting in a Serbian victory. There is a small church and crypt for the Serbian Army soldiers who died in the battle. Near the top of the mountain, on the Greek side, there is a small church named St. Peter's (Sveti Petar in Serbian), the peak itself is called, besides Kajmakčalan, Profitis Ilias (Greek: Εκκλησία Προφήτης Ηλίας).

== See also ==
- List of European ultra prominent peaks
