= Kneza Miloša Street =

Street in Belgrade, Serbia

Kneza Miloša street
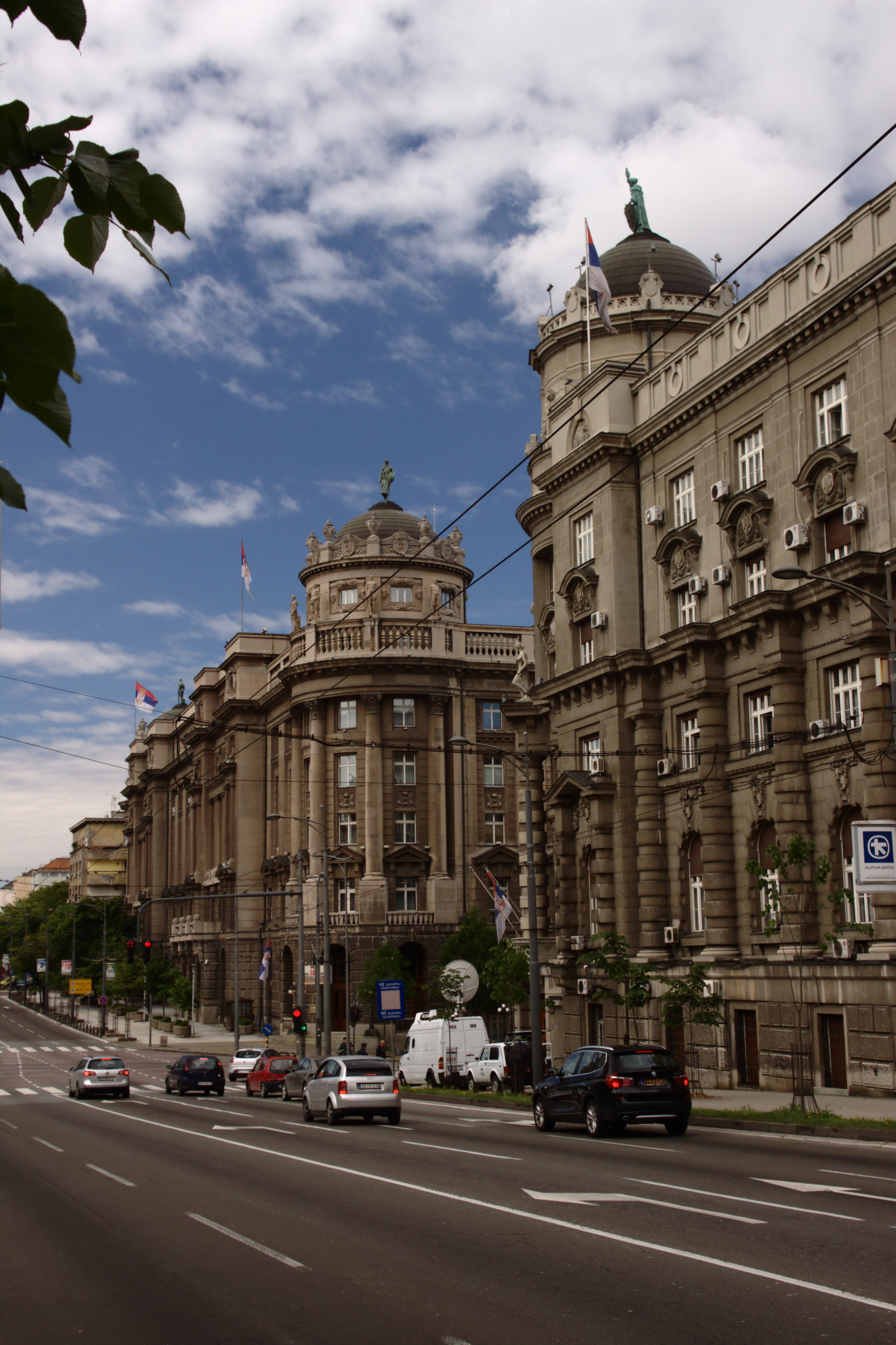
- The Government Building (right) and the Ministry of Foreign Affairs Building (left)

- Location within Belgrade
- Native name: Улица кнеза Милоша (Serbian)
- Namesake: Miloš Obrenović
- Location: Belgrade

Kneza Miloša Street (Serbian Cyrillic: Улица кнеза Милоша, romanized: Ulica kneza Miloša, lit. "Prince Miloš Street") is a street in downtown Belgrade, Serbia. It was the main city's korzo (promenade) and today is one of the major traffic arteries of the city, location of some of the most important national institutions and a street with the largest number of embassies in Belgrade. It stretches through the territory of three municipalities: Stari Grad, Vračar and Savski Venac. Previously known as Topčider Road, it was later named after prince Miloš Obrenović, the first ruler of modern Serbia (1815–1839 and 1858–1860).

In 2020, the street, with its surroundings, was protected by the law and declared a protected spatial cultural-historical unit. A total of twelve buildings situated along the street have been already previously declared a separate cultural monuments.

== Location and course ==
Kneza Miloša begins at the intersection with Bulevar kralja Aleksandra. It receives the dead end Lazarevića street from the left and crosses the intersections with Andrićev venac street on the right and Krunska on the left, and with the city's main street, Kralja Milana. The next intersection is with the streets Kraljice Natalije on the right and Masarikova on the left, and then it receives Admirala Geprata street from the right. From then on, it crosses the streets Nemanjina, Birčaninova, Vojvode Milenka, Miloša Pocerca, Višegradska and Durmitorska. After 1.87 km (1.16 mi) of a straight line course in a south-westerly direction, the street ends at the Mostar interchange.

== History ==
=== Development ===
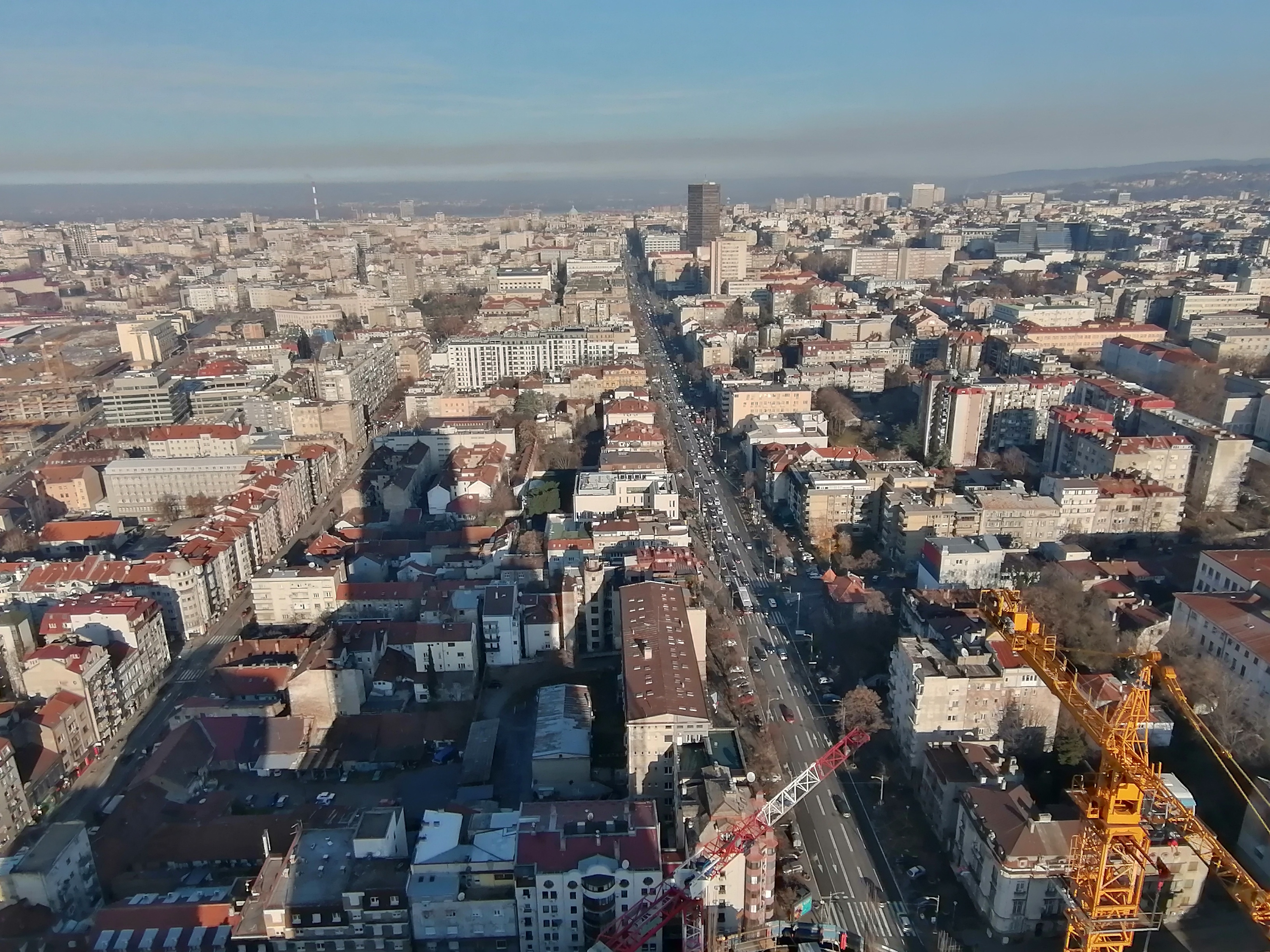

The street originated during the rule of prince Miloš, and was originally called Topčiderski drum (Topčider road), as it connected the downtown with the Miloš' court in the Topčider wood (Residence of Prince Miloš). It was named after prince Miloš in 1872. At that time, National Assembly of Serbia was located at the intersection with the Kraljice Natalije street, like some of the ministries. The assembly building was a humble, low and unrepresentative edifice, so sometimes the deputies held sessions in the "Kasina" hotel on the Terazije square. In its upper, urban part, the road was fully formed in the 1840s, as part of the development plan for this section of Belgrade. The plan was drafted by Franz Janke.

Atanasije Nikolić, engineer and urbanist, was charged with making the city greener. In the process of planting trees across Belgrade, he arranged the Košutnjak and Topčider parks (including park's nursery garden) and planted avenues along Terazije and Topčider Road. While he embellished Terazije with chestnut trees, he formed an avenue of Lombardy poplars in the upper, more urbanized part of Topčidеr Road, while on the lower Nikolić planted poplars.

In this period, the street marked an eastern border of urban Belgrade. The commercial zone, with grocery stores (čaršija), spread from Terazije to the street, while from this point on, the gardens and fields extended to the east until the marshy pond where the Slavija Square is today, where local population went for duck hunting. Where the major crossroad of Kneza Miloša and steep Nemanjina streets is today, Topčider road was actually crossing over the stream of Vračarski Potok, which was draining the Slavija Pond into the pond of Bara Venecija in the Savamala neighborhood. Only after the Belgrade Main railway station was built in Bara Venecija in 1884, the stream was conducted underground and the Nemanjina was transformed into the proper street.

At the end of the 19th and the beginning of the 20th century, Kneza Miloša (or Miloša Velikog (Miloš the Great street) as it was known, was turned into the city's main promenade or korzo. Queen Natalija often walked down the korzo, mingling with the people. The lower section of the street passed between affluent households with gardens and the Military Academy was also located there, whose cadets often paraded down the street as there was a bridle path, parallel to the street. As the tram was introduced to the street, among the first in Belgrade, korzo lost its function. The tram line, Belgrade-Topčider, was a sort of an excursion line, which Queen Natalija also often used, travelling with her son and future king, Alexander I of Serbia. She preferred the tram over the fiacre. Also colloquially styled the Korzo of Queen Natalija, the street lots this function completely by 1910 when the central Knez Mihailova Street became the main Belgrade promenade.

Up to the 1890s, most of the street was populated with small, crumbly houses with orchards, fields and wooden fences. Only then construction of proper, nice houses began and after 1900 numerous villas were built along the street. At the end of the street, where the modern Mostar road interchange is, was kafana Kafana pocepanih gaća ("Torn nickers"). Queen Draga ordered for the name to be changed to Tri ključa ("Three keys"). Much later, this became the name of the park which was planted on this location, today also known as the Park Gazela, after the nearby bridge over the Sava river.

The first traffic light in the Belgrade was placed at the crossroad of the Bulevar kralja Aleksandra, Takovska Street and the beginning of the Kneza Miloša in November 1939. The plan was to place them at every busy crossroad in the city, but the outbreak of World War II squashed the plans. Instead, the second traffic light was placed only in 1953, in the neighborhood of London, at the crossroad of the Kneza Miloša and Maršala Tita (today Kralja Milana). In 1965, along the entire route of the Kneza Miloša-Takovska streets, the first green wave was introduced.

=== Events ===
The street gained somewhat of an assassination notoriety, due to the events connected with it, though they are results of the fact that most important government buildings are located in it. When Prince Mihailo Obrenović was fatally wounded in Topčider, it was this road through which the carriage with the wounded prince rushed downtown to try to save the prince's life. Still, the prince died during the ride, somewhere where the modern London building is.

On the corner with Masarikova street, a Communist Spasoje Stević attempted to assassinate the king Alexander I of Yugoslavia in 1921. As the king was in the carriage with the prime minister Nikola Pašić, Stević threw the grenade at the carriage but hit the telegraph line instead. King and prime minister were unharmed, but several pedestrians were wounded. The assassination attempt was organized by Mustafa Golubić, and the dynamite grenade was thrown by Stević from the Trade Ministry building (today Finance Ministry).

When prime minister Zoran Đinđić was assassinated on 12 March 2003 in front of the building of the government, he was rushed to the ER via the Kneza Miloša, but the wounds were fatal.

=== 1999 bombing ===
Kneza Miloša was heavily bombed by NATO in 1999. On 2/3 April 1999, both Ministry of the Interior buildings (MUP), federal and the republic's one, were bombed. On 29/30 April Ministry of Defense and Serbian General Staff were demolished, Federal Ministry of Internal Affairs was hit again and the Government Building was damaged. On 7/8 May General Staff and Federal Ministry of Internal Affairs were bombed again and on 24/25 May the Ministry of Internal Affairs of Serbia.

== Characteristics ==
Kneza Miloša is one of 34 streets in downtown Belgrade which have never changed their names since the names were awarded to the streets for the first time in the 19th century.

From the beginning to the end, the street goes downhill, and since it is completely straight, it gives a nice panoramic view down the entire course. The street is 32 m (105 ft) wide, out of which 18.75 m (61.5 ft) is the driveway and 13.25 m (43.5 ft) sidewalks.

In its first section, Kneza Miloša marks the border between Stari Grad and Vračar, until the intersection with Kraljice Natalije/Masarikova, where it enters Savski Venac. It goes through and directly connects several old neighborhoods of Belgrade: Tašmajdan, Krunski Venac, Andrićev Venac, London, West Vračar and Mostar. Through its natural extensions on the north (Takovska street) and south (Bulevar Vojvode Putnika), it makes a direct traffic transversal which goes through the entire "Old" Belgrade, in the northeast to southwest direction.

Named after the founder of the Obrenović, prince Miloš, it crosses three other streets named after members of the same dynasty: queen Natalija, king Alexander and king Milan.

As it has many representative buildings, some of them were used by the Germans when they occupied Belgrade in 1941. During the 1998 façade cleaning of the building of the Ministry of the foreign affairs, Wehrmacht insignia were discovered below the surface layer.

== Notable features ==
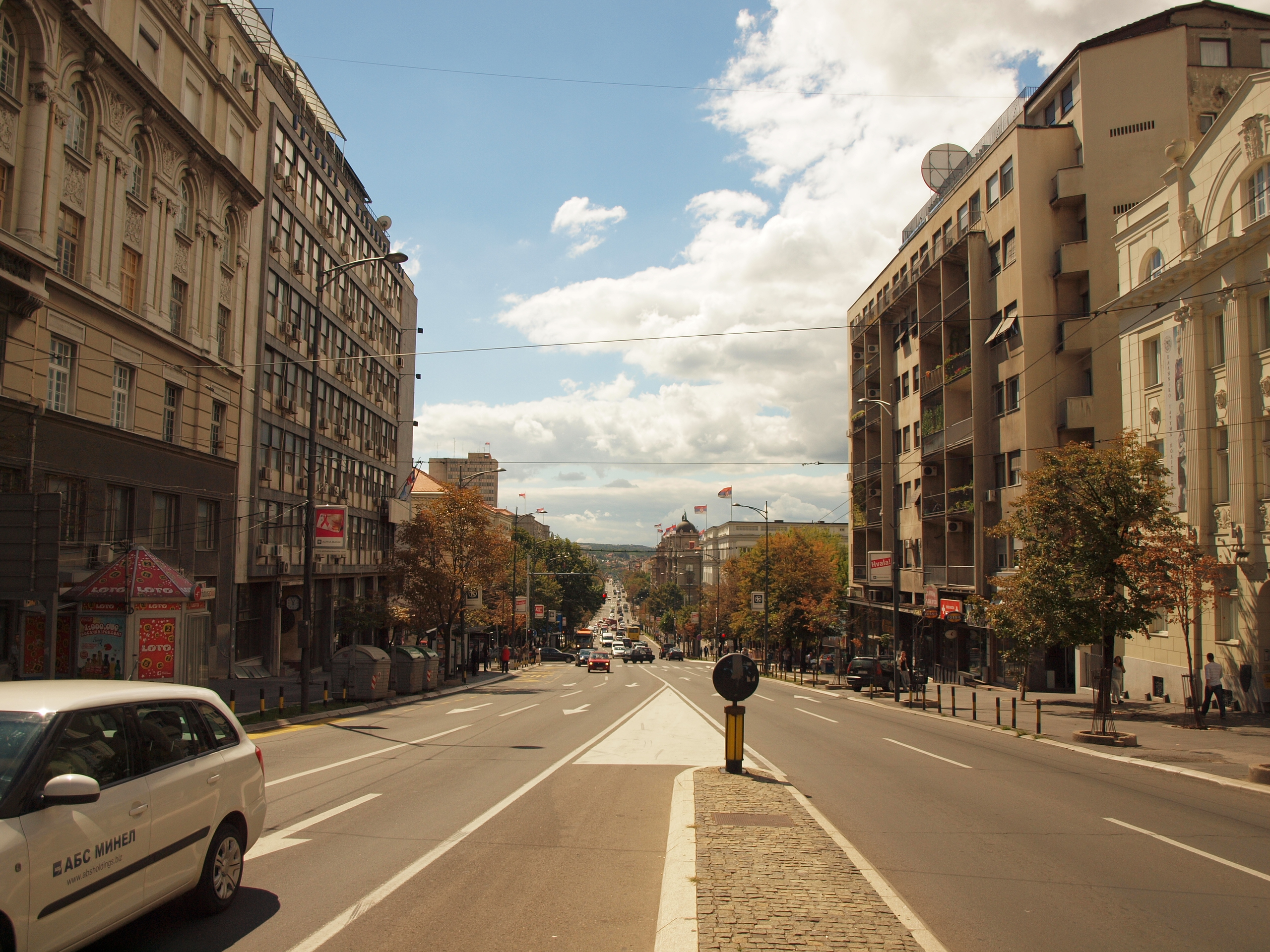
London section

The street preserved many buildings from the Interbellum. A number of them are protected by the state as cultural and historical monuments.

=== Vicinity of the beginning of the street ===
- Tašmajdan Park
- Saint Mark's Church
- Main Post Office Palace
- House of the National Assembly

=== Upper section ===
==== Right side ====
- Pioneers Park and Archaeological Site Pionirski Park; a park and location of one of the most important archaeologic sites of the ancient Singidunum.
- Andrićev Venac; dedicated to the Nobel prize laureate in literature, Ivo Andrić and the seat of the President of Serbia.

==== Left side ====
- No. 1; kafana Tri lista duvana (Three tobacco leaves); popular in its own name, it was famous for the first ever telephone call in Serbia, in 1881. Demolished in 1991 for the Hotel Hilton to be built, but because of the Yugoslav Wars, a temporary parking lot was constructed instead. In 2007 building of an 8-storey-tall commercial edifice began which was completed from the outside, but as of 2017 it is still not in use.
- No. 1-a; Music school Stanković; founded in 1911.
- No. 5; Hotel Excelsior; originally built as a clinic in 1921, but instead opened as a hotel in 1924; projected by the Viennese architects, it was used by the Germans as their General Staff in Belgrade during the World War II, then as the Ministry of Agriculture and Forestry 1945-48 and since then hotel again; Renamed to the Mercure Belgrade Excelsior in the 2010s.
- No. 7; House of the Yugoslav Engineers and Architects Society; built from 1933 to 1935 upon design by Milan Manojlović and Isak Azriel and aimed to "visually represent Yugoslav ideology and dominant political doctrine of both the society and the state itself". Since 1999, location of the Tuckwood Cineplex; in January 2019 declared a cultural monument.
- corner with the Krunska; Embassy of Turkey.
- No. 19; Petronijević House; built in 1922 for the banker Miloš Petronijević and designed by Nikola Nestorović. Constructed in the style of academism, and known for its richly ornamented façade in the mixed rustic and secessionist style, the building was declared a cultural monument in December 2019.
- intersection with the Kralja Milana; Jugobanka Building, built from 1921 to 1924 for the Adriatic-Danubian Bank, continuing to host banks until 2023. Designed by August Rheinfels in the academic classicist style, supervised by Ivan Belić, ornamented by Lojze Dolinar, Toma Rosandić and Petar Palaviccini, it has a richly ornamented stone façade, and a large atrium with the sculptured Aphrodite fountain. Massive reconstruction began in 2023 by the owner, Serbian "sugar king" Miodrag Kostić, with intent to transform it into the "science palace".

=== Central section ===
==== Right side ====
- intersection with the Kralja Milana; once famed kafana "London", which gave name to the entire neighborhood. In the transition mayhem since the 1990s, restaurant was turned into the seat of the Ponzi scheme called the "Dafiment Banka", casino, coffee shop, and as of 2017 it is one of the Idea supermarkets.
- Ascencion Church; built in 1863, damaged in the bombing during the World War II, both by the Germans (in 1941), and by the Allies (in 1944).
- No. 20; Building of the Finance Ministry; built in 1889, additional floors added in 1924 and 1959. The 1924 expansion was projected by Nikolay Krasnov.
- Finansijski Park, (Financial Park); one of the oldest in Belgrade, renamed to the Park Gavrilo Princip in April 2017.
- A monument to prince Miloš in the park;
- Intersection with Nemanjina; Building of the Government Building; projected by Nikolay Krasnov, built 1926–28, upgraded in 1938. Originally, the Finance Ministry.
- No. 24-26; Ministry of Foreign Affairs Building; originally The Ministry of Forestry and mining and later Ministry of Agriculture and Waters. Projected by Nikolay Krasnov, built 1923–28.

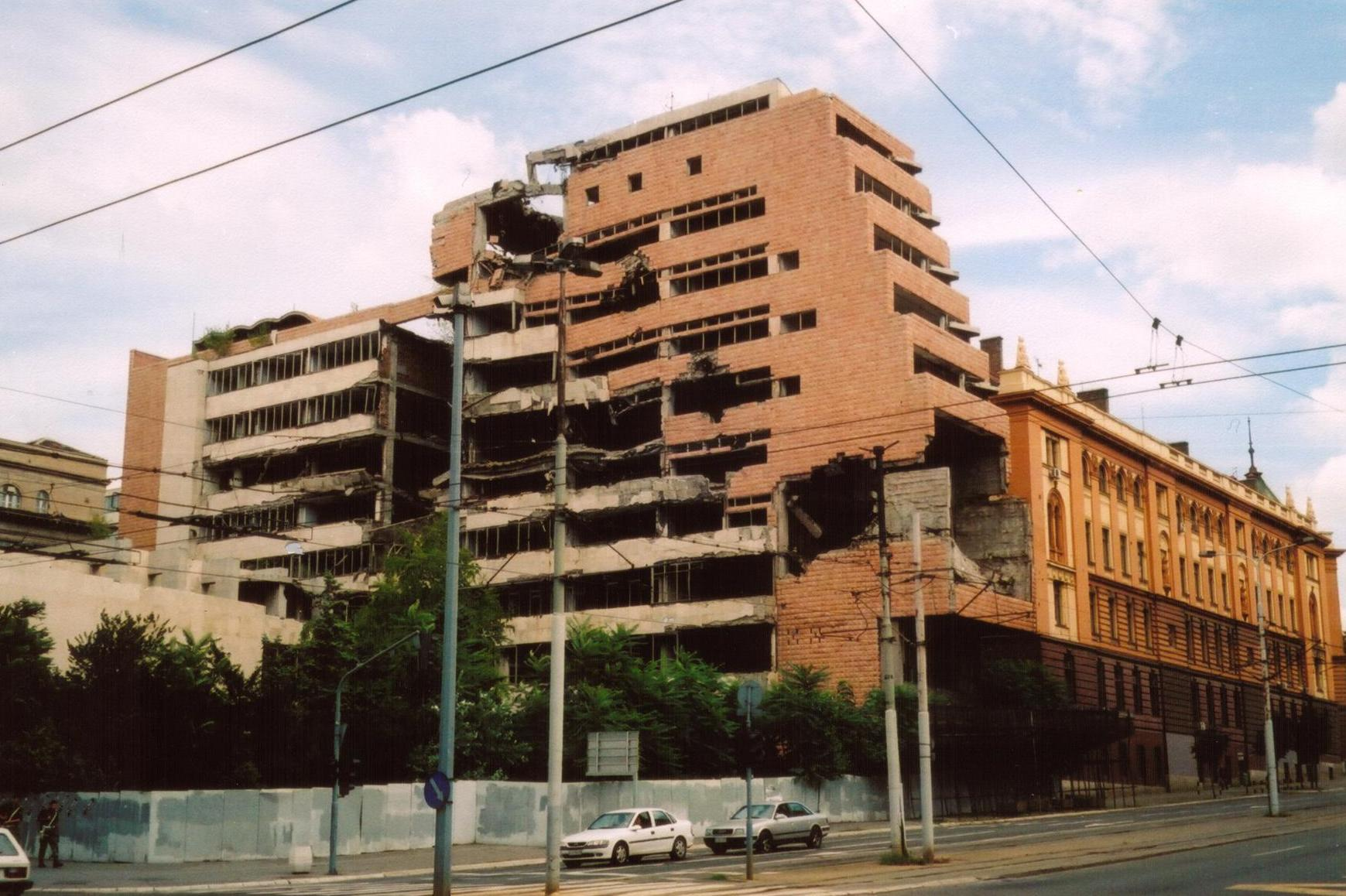
Building of the General Staff, destroyed in the 1999 NATO bombing of Yugoslavia. It was completely demolished in the 2010s

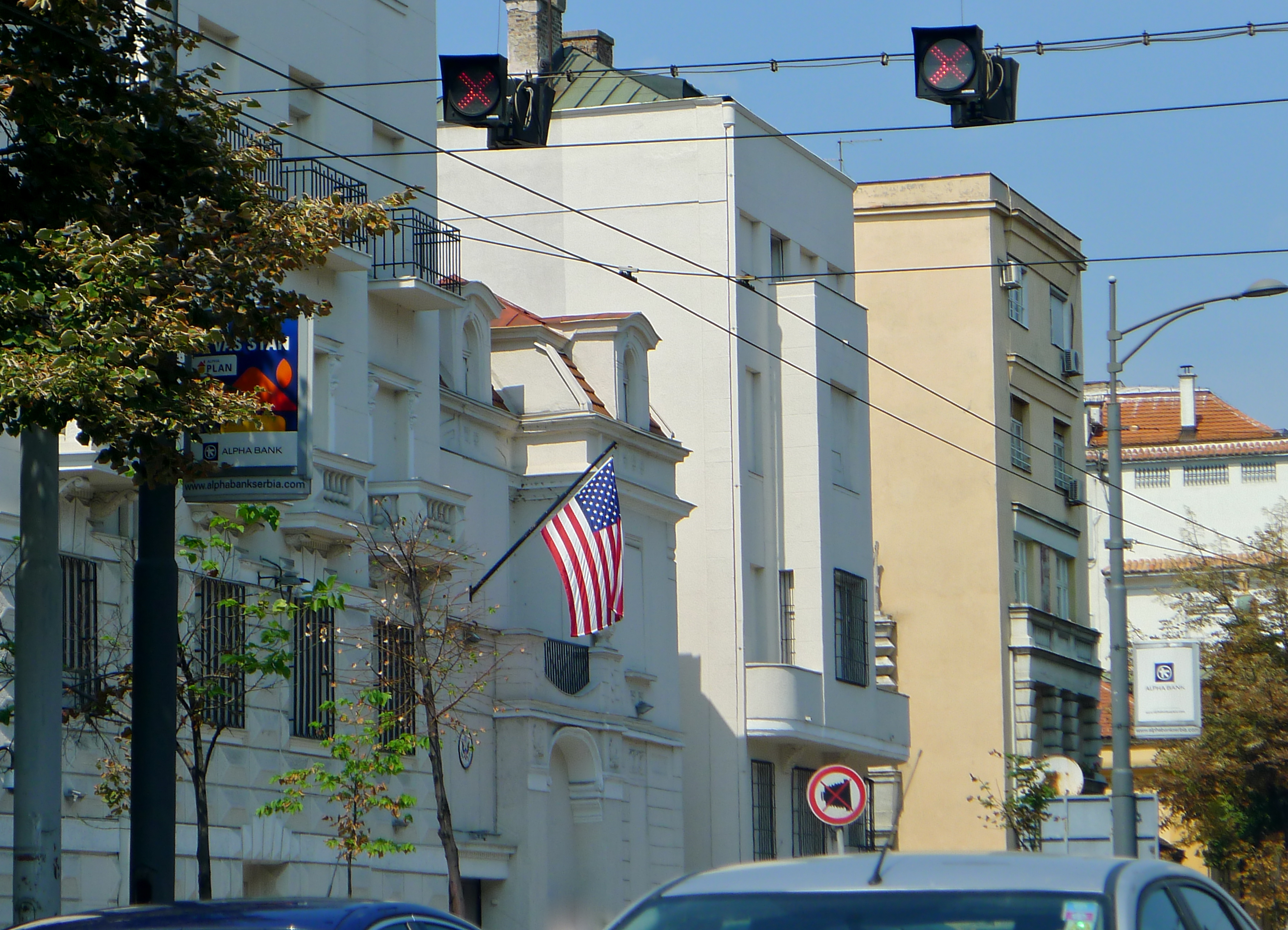
Former embassy of USA in Kneza Miloša Street

==== Left side ====
- corner with the Masarikova; The Beograđanka, 101 meters-high skyscraper built 1969–74.
- No. 33-41; Building of the General Staff; projected by Nikola Dobrović and built 1957–65, one of the most representative works of architecture in Belgrade, destroyed in the several attack waves by NATO in 1999 and partially demolished. The future of the complex is not known at the moment. Mohammed bin Zayed Al Nahyan (UAE) and Donald Trump showed an interest into building a hotel at the location, but the architects and urbanists are against it, asking for the building to be reconstructed as it was. As of 2017, the northern half of the building is being gradually demolished.

=== Lower section ===
==== Right side ====
- No. 38: Embassy of Poland;
- No. 50; Embassy of the United States of America; vacated since 2013 when the embassy moved to another location. In 2016 US sold the building to the Israeli investors who announced the plans to completely demolish the building by the end of 2016 and build a hotel but as of 2017 the building is still standing and it's empty. In the end, it was adapted into the luxurious residential complex, named Kneza Miloša Residence. On 13 June 2022, a memorial plaque dedicated to the U.S. diplomat and former ambassador to Belgrade, George F. Kennan, was placed on the building's façade.
- No. 62; Embassy of Croatia;
- No. 66; Embassy of Guinea, defunct since the mid-1990s.
- No. 70; Embassy of Romania;
- No. 72; Embassy of Myanmar;
- No. 74-76; Embassy of Germany; new building is due to open in 2018.
- No. 82; Building of the Yugoslav River Shipping; a massive building, built by the German prisoners of war specifically as the seat of UDBA, Yugoslav secret service, in 1946. In 1952 Supreme Court of Yugoslavia moved into the building and Yugoslav River Shipping bought it in 1968.
- No. 92; Building of the Federal Ministry of the Interior; built for UDBA, which moved into the building in 1952, when the older building in No. 82 became too small for its operations. Completely destroyed by NATO in 1999. Several Israeli investors changed the ownership of the lot. In 2016 the clearing up of the lot began and the investors announced they will build a 30-storey-tall tower. It caused a furor in both the public and among the architects. City authorities said that even they don't know what will be built and that only after the land is cleared, city and the investors will see what the project will look like.

==== Left side ====
- No. 69; Savski Venac Municipal Building;
- No. 75; Embassy of Canada;
- Mostar Interchange; Building of the Interior Ministry of Serbia; destroyed by NATO in 1999; as of 2017 it is gradually being demolished;

== Future ==
In 2016 city government announced a detailed reconstruction of the Kneza Miloša, based on the look of one of the main Barcelona's avenues, Passeig de Gràcia. Reconstruction was to include adding one more traffic lane, green island in the middle of street, thick avenues, widened sidewalks, bicycle paths, underground garage with 427 parking spots and glass, decorative entrances into the garage. According to the chief city urbanist Milutin Folić, the works were to begin by the mid-2017 and to finish by the summer of 2018. The garage was planned to cover an area of 12,100 m^{2} (130,000 sq ft) with the projected cost of €7 million and in August 2017 the building permits were obtained but the works were moved to the spring of 2018, In November 2017, construction of the garages was pushed to 2019.

In September 2019, when reconstruction of the sidewalks was to begin, the works were moved for spring 2020, with a major change in the plan - the underground, elongated garages stretching for a kilometer, were dropped from the project. Though the blueprints for the underground garages were made, it was decided then to build the one leveled, above the ground. As many military objects are in the street, the city contacted military authorities asking where the large garage should be located, but the Ministry of Defense didn't answer. The project would have to be changed again after the military picks the location. In April 2020, during the outbreak of the coronavirus, new chief city urbanist Marko Stojčić sad that the project is moved to 2021–2022, not because of the pandemic, but because the construction is not ready anyway. Some reporters referred to the project as the "dream of Spanish boulevard".

In May 2021, Stojčić admitted that they don't know where to place garages, that even the conceptual design is not drafted, and that works certainly will not start before 2023. However, deputy mayor Goran Vesić in September 2021 announced "serious reconstruction", with double avenues and a garage at the empty lot next to the Foreign Ministry building. However, when the budget for 2023 was adopted, with projections until 2025, there were no funds allocated for this project.

== Protection ==
On 29 December 2020, the government of Serbia declared the street and its surroundings a protected spatial cultural-historical unit, and placed it under the legal protection. The protected area is bordered by the streets: Kneza Miloša, Krunska, Resavska, Višegradska, Durmitorska, Sarajevska, Hajduk Veljkov Venac, Balkanska, Admirala Geprata, Dobrinjska, Kralja Milana and Andrićev Venac.

On the same day the protection was adopted, a building which is covered with the protected area, at 14 Admirala Geprata Street, was exempt from the protection, and the investor was granted the right to demolish it. The building was Zvezdan Jovanović's vantage point in the assassination of prime minister Zoran Đinđić. Investors from Cyprus envisioned a square edifice with "transparent" ground floor, which would allow a view from the street on the Hammam of Prince Miloš, which is on the other side of the building, in the Gavrilo Princip Park. They will also have to commemorate in some way the role of the building in the assassination. The decision provoked another negative public reaction, as it was part of the years long demolition of old buildings in Belgrade in order to accommodate investors.
