= Diplomatic Archives of Serbia =

Archives of the Ministry of Foreign Affairs of Serbia

- Дипломатски архив Србије

Agency overview
- Formed: 1919; 107 years ago
- Jurisdiction: Government of Serbia
- Headquarters: Ministry of Foreign Affairs Building, 24-26 Kneza Miloša, Belgrade, Serbia
- Parent agency: Ministry of Foreign Affairs
- Website: Official website

The Diplomatic Archives of Serbia (Serbian: Дипломатски архив Србије, romanized: Diplomatski arhiv Srbije), formally the Diplomatic Archives of the Ministry of Foreign Affairs of the Republic of Serbia (Serbian: Дипломатски архив Министарства спољних послова Републике Србије, romanized: Diplomatski arhiv Ministarstva spoljnih poslova Republike Srbije), are the central archival institution of the Ministry of Foreign Affairs of Serbia in charge of archiving Serbia's diplomatic documents. Headquartered in Belgrade, records at the Diplomatic Archives are nominally available to the public 30 years after their creation. The vast majority of documents in the Diplomatic Archives are in Serbian and other varieties of Serbo-Croatian, necessitating certain proficiency in the language for effective research. The archival material kept at the institution are particularly relevant for understanding of the Cold War era history due to Yugoslavia's prominent role in Non-Aligned Movement.

== History ==
=== Kingdom of Yugoslavia ===
The archives were established on May 5, 1919, by a decree of the Ministry of Foreign Affairs of the newly established Kingdom of Serbs, Croats, and Slovenes. The new archival unit inherited earlier documentation and libraries of the foreign affairs ministries of the Kingdom of Serbia and the Kingdom of Montenegro. The oldest document in the new archives was the formal alliance agreement between Principality of Serbia and Principality of Romania from 1868. An expert commission was established at the archive in 1924 tasked with inspection of documents related to the creation of the new unified Yugoslav kingdom helping in further professionalization of the archival work. From April 5, 1930, the new law on the diplomatic archives specified institutional holdings and procedures. On August 10, 1939, the archives were transferred into History Department but further development was abruptly interrupted by the invasion of Yugoslavia on 6 April 1941, devastating World War II in Yugoslavia and by the transfer of diplomatic documents to Nazi Germany and later on Soviet Union. Already in 1940, extensive plans were developed to evacuate the Ministry's archives and categorize them by importance to protect the most valuable materials. Following Yugoslavia's capitulation on April 17, 1941, the History Department ceased operations for four years. Portions of the archives were destroyed, while other materials were seized and transferred to Austria, including to the State Military Archives in Vienna, and the provincial archives in Klagenfurt and Graz. Some Yugoslav archives were also sent to the Central Archives of the Reich in Potsdam.

=== Socialist Yugoslavia ===
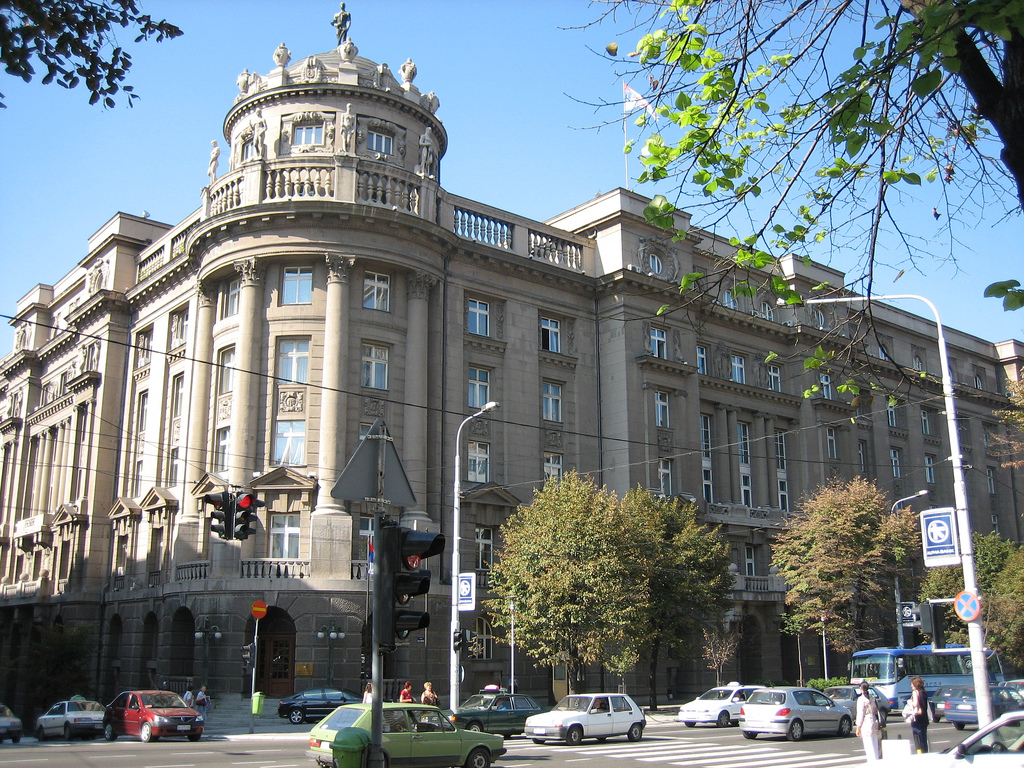
Ministry of Foreign Affairs Building, housing the Diplomatic Archives

After the liberation of Belgrade and the establishment of the Democratic Federal Yugoslavia the History Department reinitiated its work in March 1945. From March 1945 to mid-1949, its primary focus was on recovering documents taken out of the country during World War II. In 1949, following the Tito–Stalin split and during the Informbiro period the archives were closed, and their documents were moved to more isolated parts of the country. They resumed operations at the end of 1957 in Dubrovnik, housed in the old Benedictine monastery of St. Jacob. In 1960, they relocated to Belgrade, where they have been open for scientific research since 1961.

=== Serbia and Montenegro ===
Following the breakup of Yugoslavia, Yugoslav Wars and subsequent signing of the Agreement on Succession Issues of the Former Socialist Federal Republic of Yugoslavia the first group of researchers from the Archives of the Republic of Slovenia in Ljubljana collectively revisited the archive in 2003.

=== Republic of Serbia ===
Serbia restored its independence following the dissolution of the state union Serbia had with Montenegro as a result of the 2006 Montenegrin independence referendum. Access to the diplomatic archives today requires permission directly from the Minister of Foreign Affairs for foreign nationals, while Serbian nationals must obtain permission from the Secretary-general of the Ministry.

== See also ==
- List of archives in Serbia
- State Archives of Serbia
- Military Archives of Serbia
- Archives of Yugoslavia
