= Nikola Dobrović =

Serbian architect, teacher and urban planner (1897–1967)

- Никола Добровић
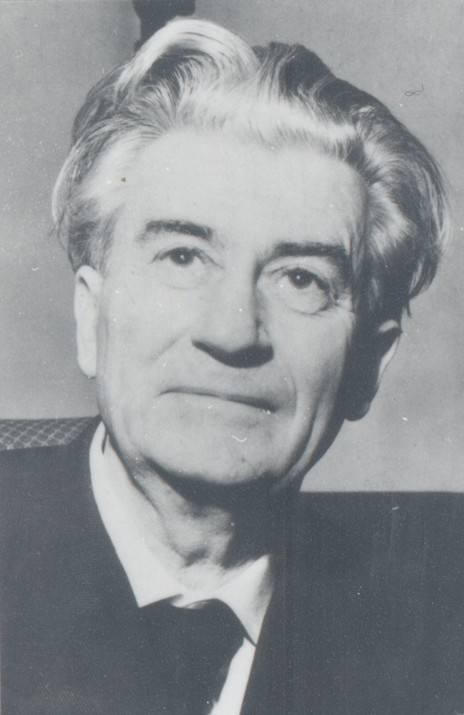
- Born: 12 February 1897; Pécs, Austria-Hungary
- Died: 11 January 1967 (aged 69); Belgrade, Yugoslavia
- Occupation: Architect
- Relatives: Petar Dobrović (brother)

Nikola Dobrović (Serbian Cyrillic: Никола Добровић, pronounced [nǐkola dǒːbroʋitɕ]; 12 February 1897 – 11 January 1967) was a Serbian architect, teacher, and urban planner. Dobrović designed a number of buildings including the Yugoslav Ministry of Defence building, later destroyed during the Kosovar War by NATO bombings, the New Belgrade planned city or various buildings in Prague and around Dubrovnik.

== Biography ==
Dobrović was born in the Hungarian city of Pécs, 1897. He started studying in Budapest but the First World War interrupted his studies and he finished them in 1923 at the Czech Technical University in Prague, where he obtained a degree in architecture.

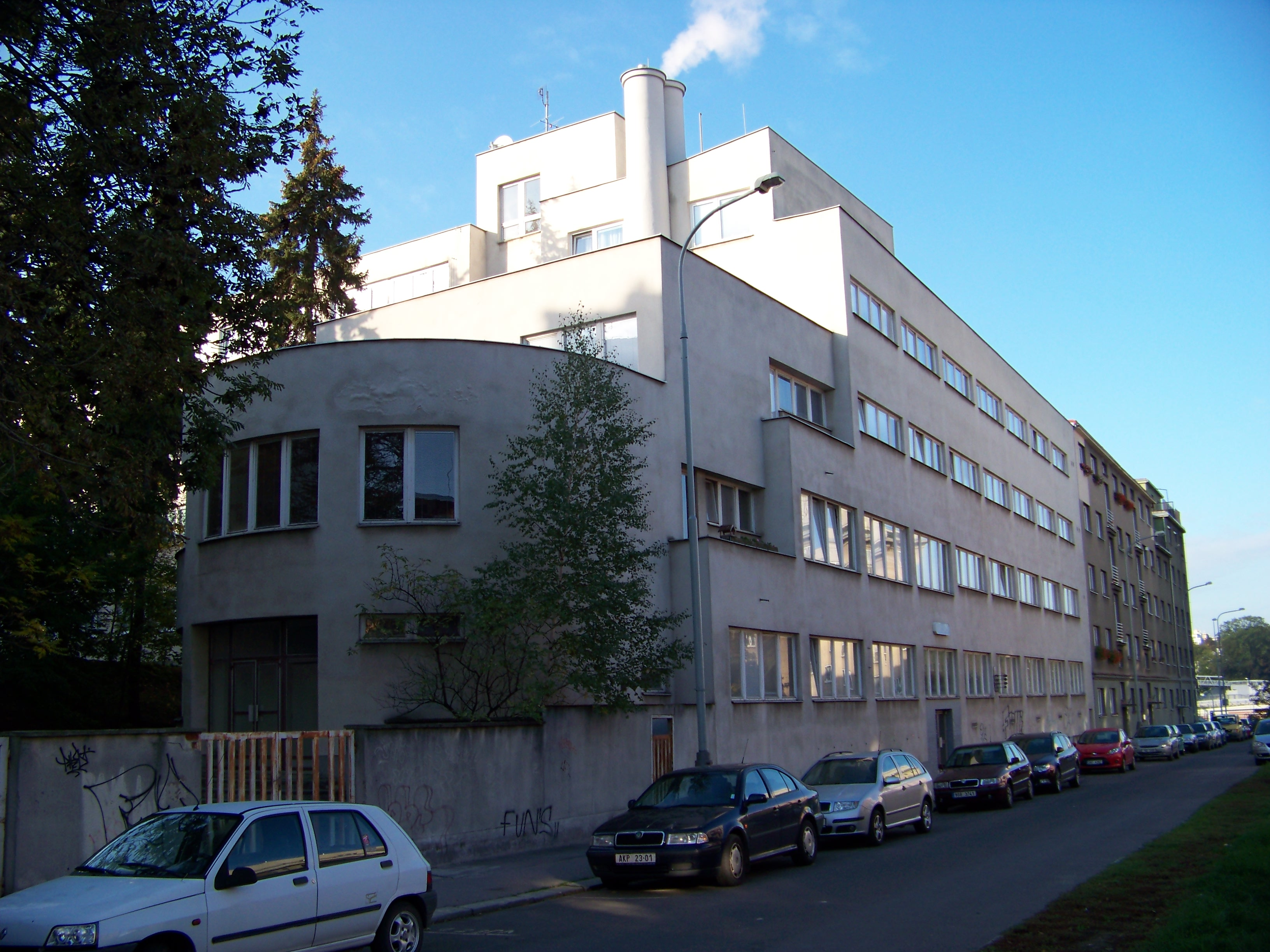
Dormitory of King Alexander I in Prague-Střešovice build between 1931-33

He gained experience in prominent Prague architectural offices (Bohumil Hübschmann, Antonín Engel, Dušek, Kozák & Maca) and in his own practice. Among his works in Prague belong co-authorship of the Palace Avion on the prominent Wenceslas Square with Bohumír Kozák (1926) or modernist student dormitories of King Alexander I (now called Komensky dormitories) in Střešovice (1933).

Dobrović moved to Dubrovnik in the early nineteen-thirties with the radical, programmatic mission of bringing modern architecture to this small but historically very important city on the Dalmatian coast. He was invited in 1930 by Dubrovnik municipal conservator Kosta Strajnić, well known as the author of the first monographs on Jože Plečnik and the sculptor Ivan Meštrović, to explain to the authorities what modern architecture actually was. To depict in the local press the exemplary architecture that would be suited to the so-called new, modern Dubrovnik, Strajnić put forward Dobrović's radical project for hotel-Kursalon on Pile, in close proximity to the most monumental part of the medieval city walls, as an alternative to the eclectic project by the Viennese architect Alfred Keller.

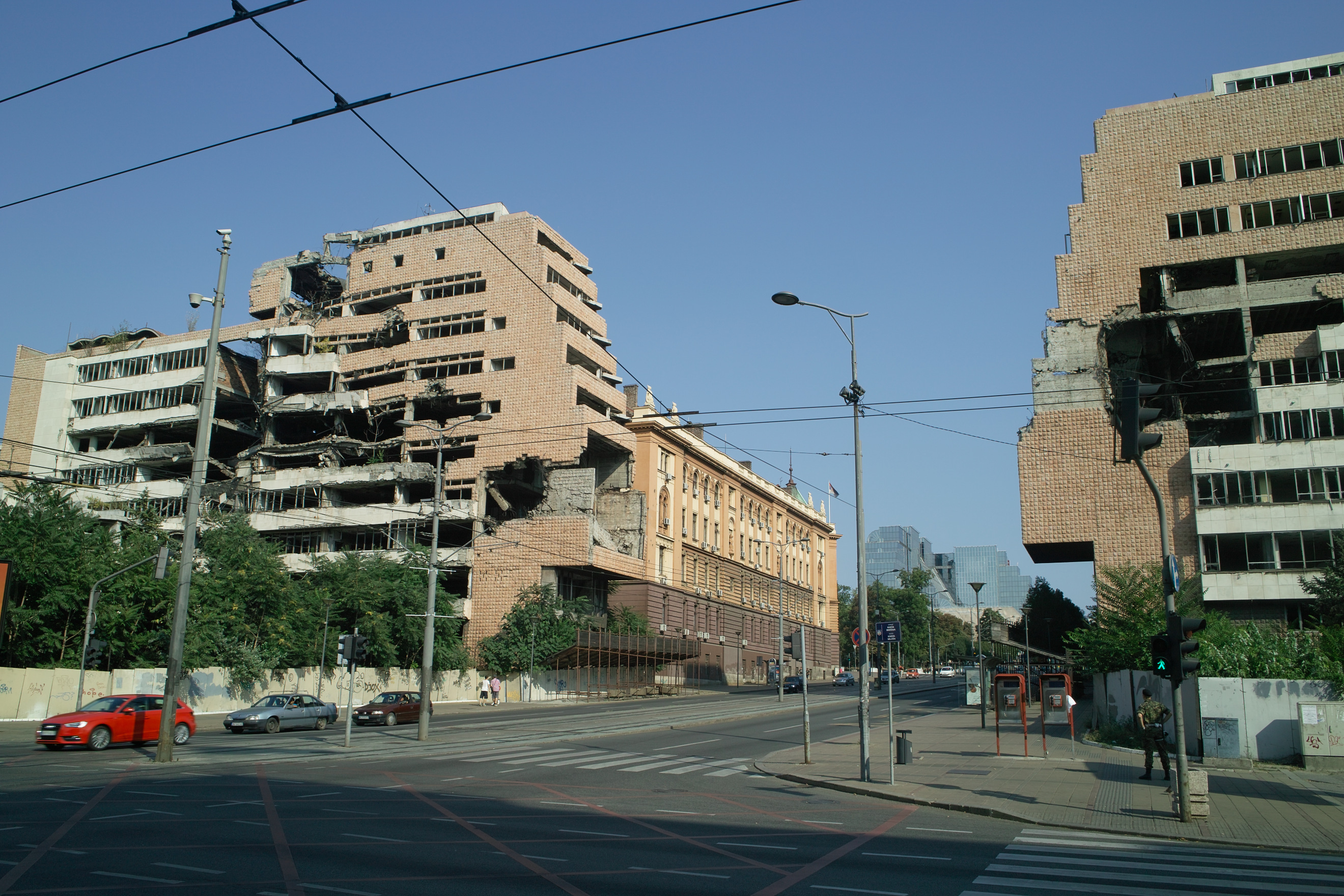
General Staff Building as of 2013

His most famous buildings are located in the Serbian capital, Belgrade. Dobrović created the first sketches for the planned city of New Belgrade as early as 1946 and now is the municipality of the same name home to around 200 thousand inhabitans. Among his notable works is the General Staff Building, constructed between 1955 and 1965 and heavily damaged during the NATO bombing of Yugoslavia in 1999. The structure later became a symbol of the bombing of Serbia and has often been used as a backdrop for ultranationalist protests.

== Gallery ==
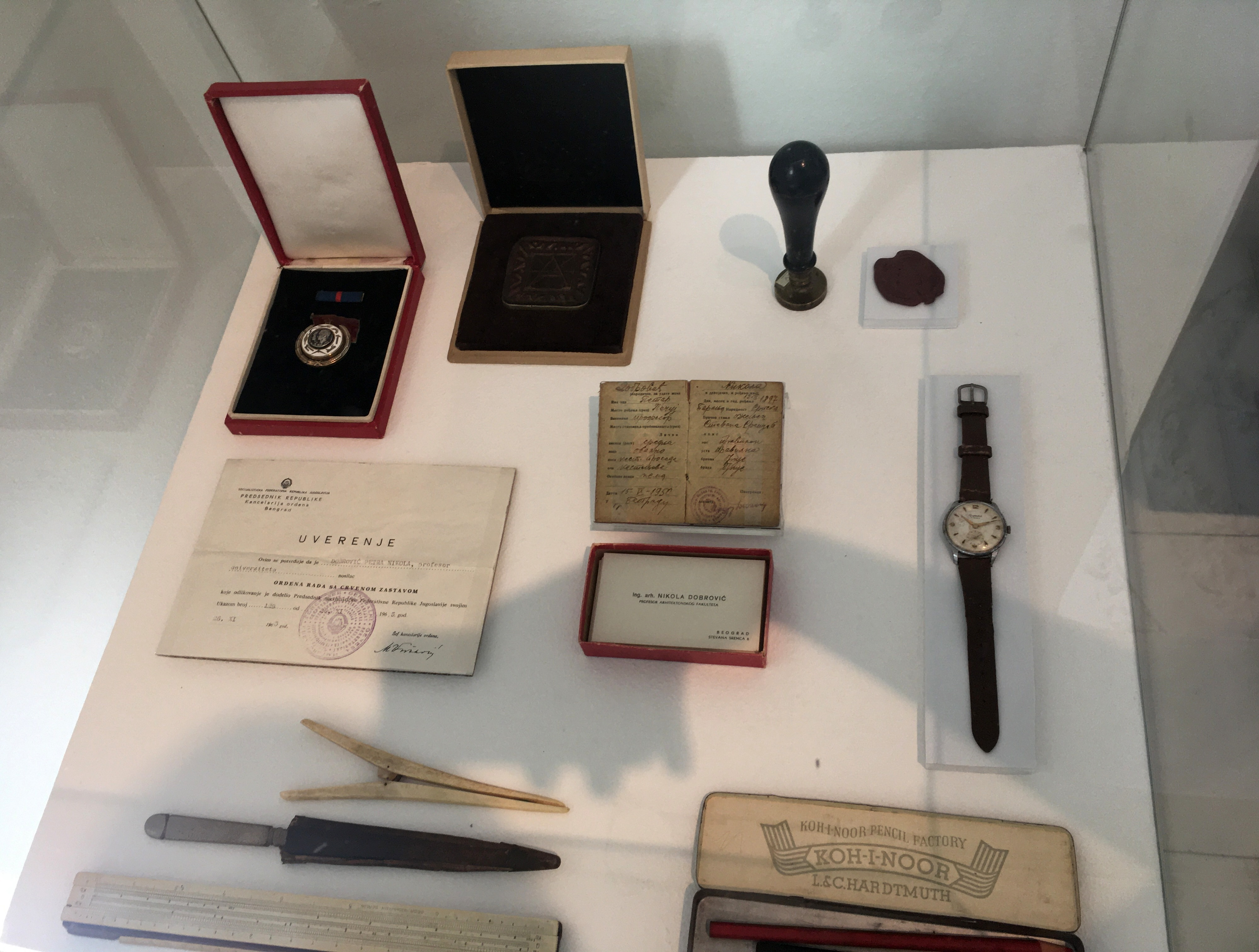
Personal belongings, from the exhibition at the SANU Gallery, 2022.

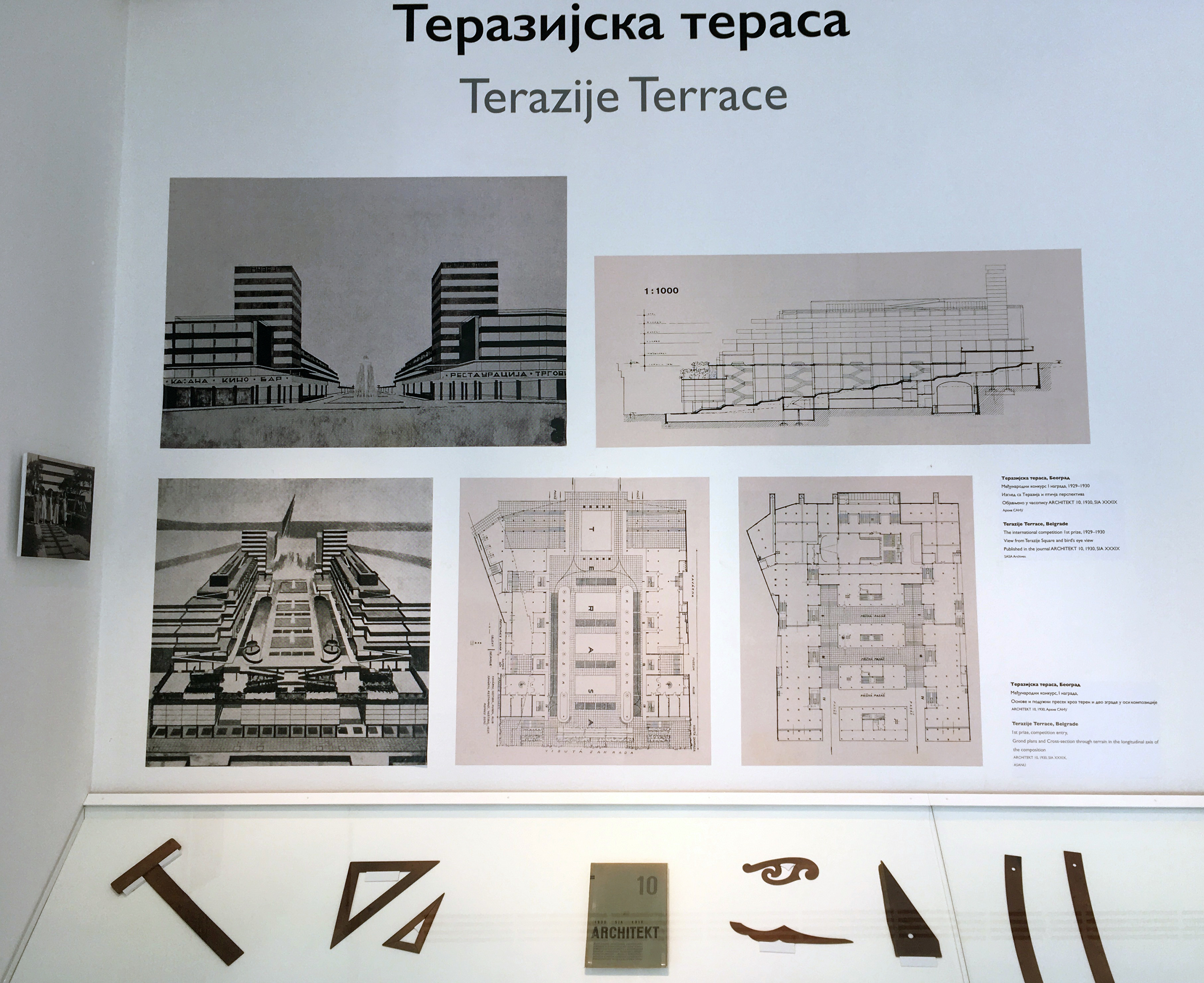
Terazije Terrace

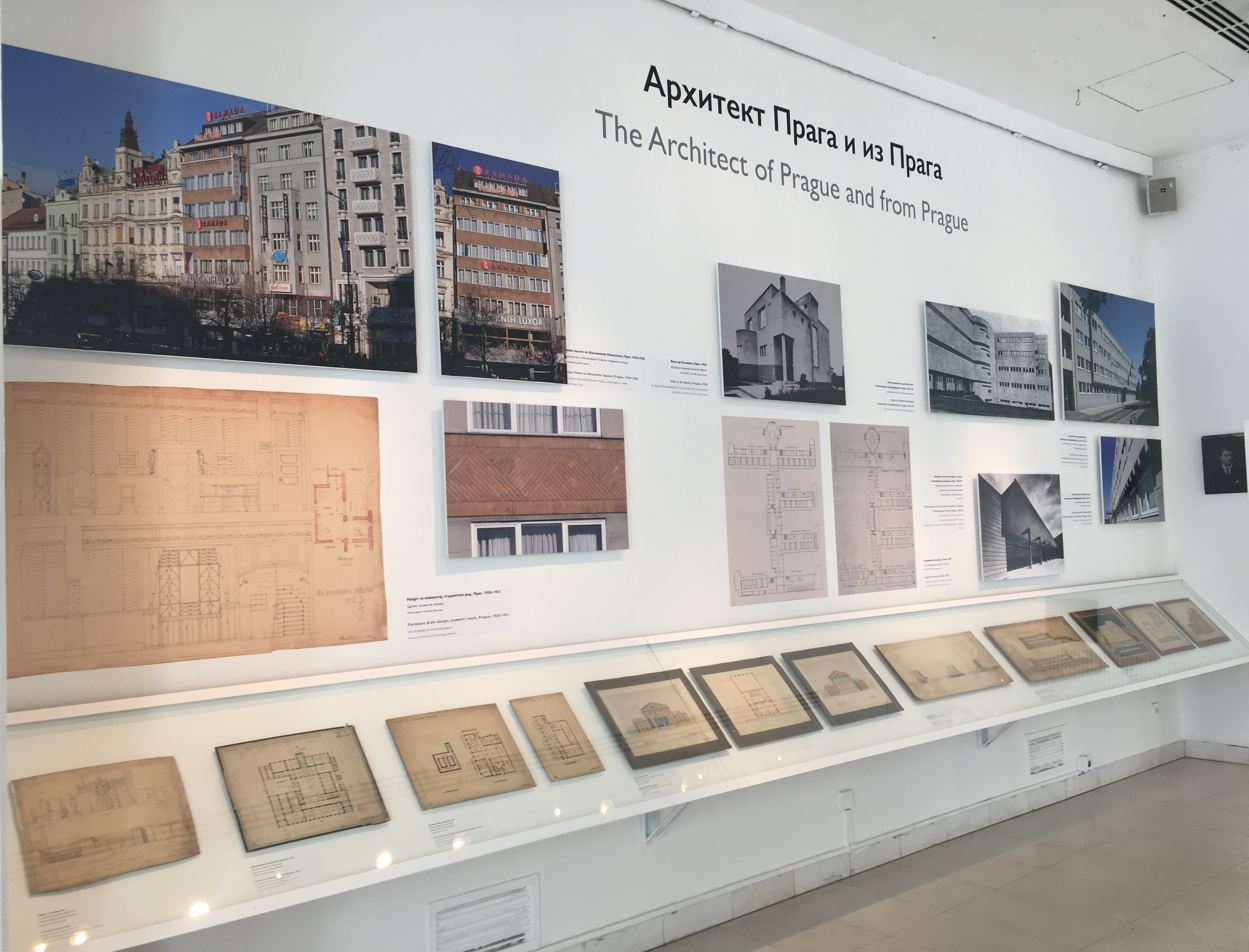
Architectural works in Prague

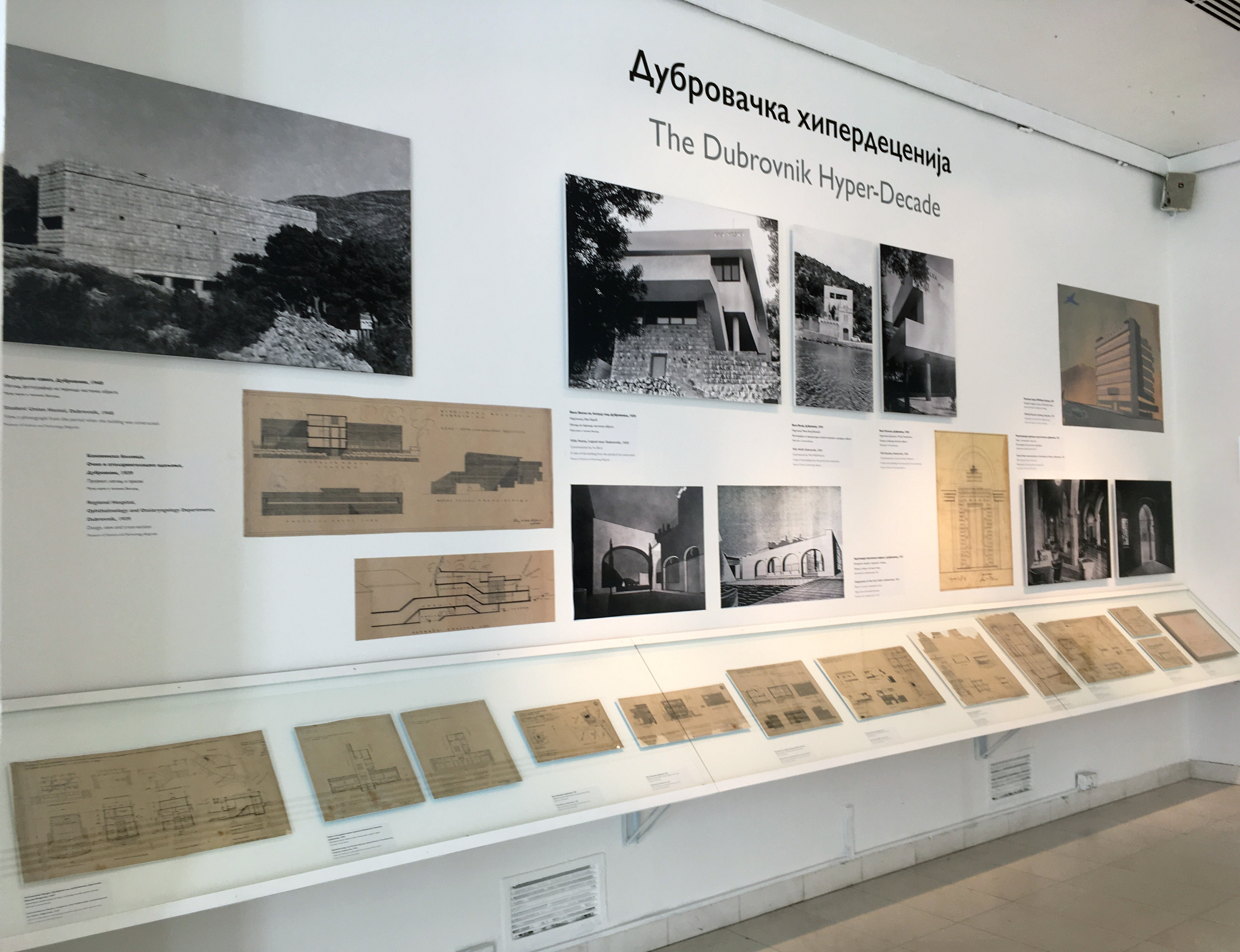
Dubrovnik Hyperdecade

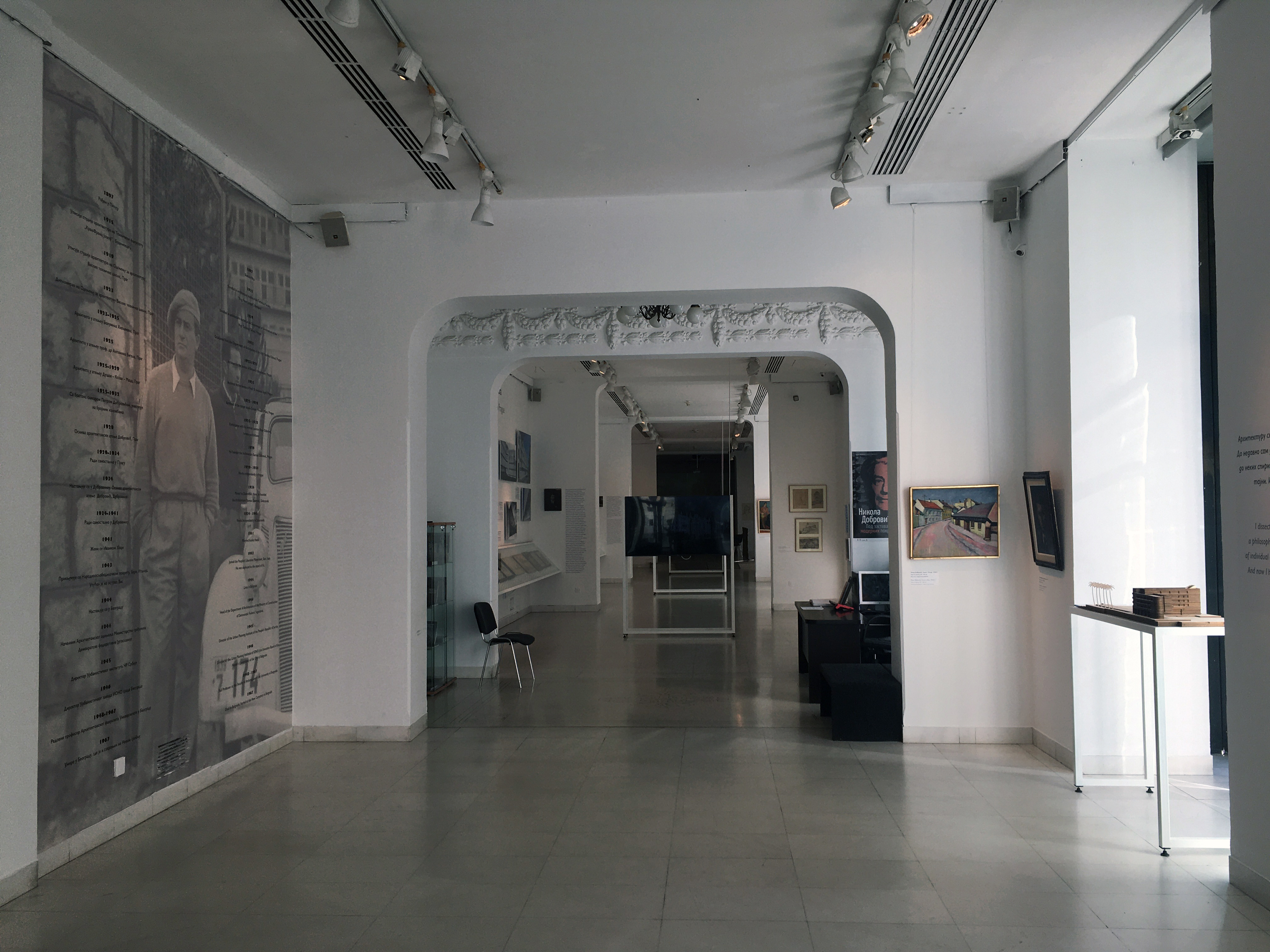
Photograph of Dobrović, from the exhibition at the SANU Gallery, 2022.

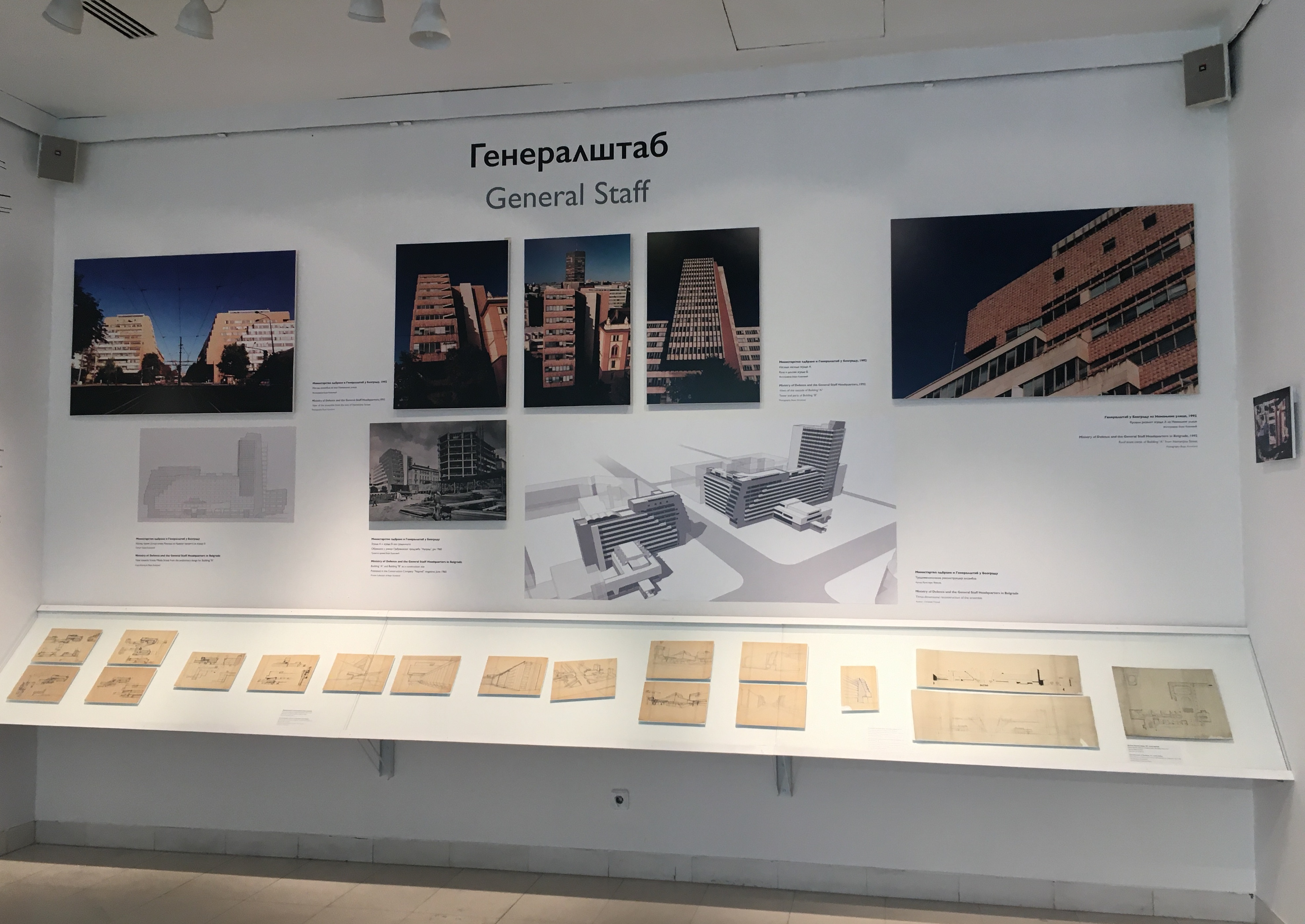
General Staff Building
