= Ministry of Foreign Affairs Building, Belgrade =

Government building in Belgrade, Serbia

Ministry of Foreign Affairs Building
- Зграда Министарства спољних послова
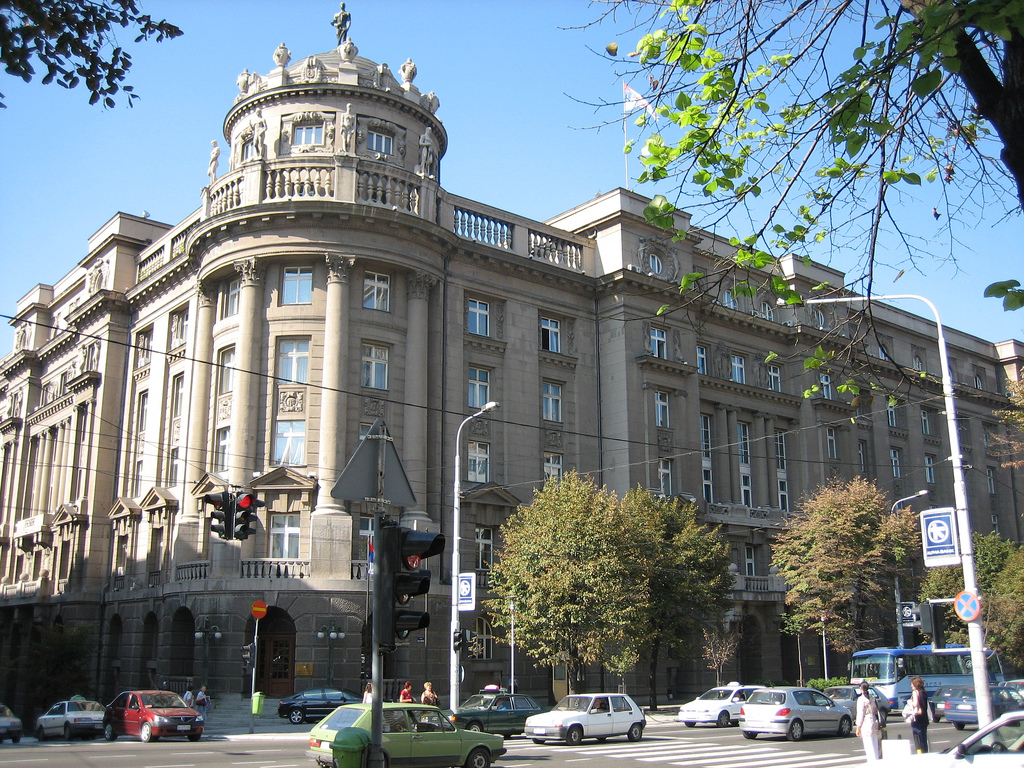
- Interactive map of the Ministry of Foreign Affairs Building area

General information
- Location: Kneza Miloša Street 24-26, Belgrade, Serbia
- Coordinates: 44.8032°N 20.4566°E
- Construction started: 1923
- Completed: 1928

Design and construction
- Architecture firm: "The Architect"

The Ministry of Foreign Affairs Building (Serbian: Зграда Министарства спољних послова, romanized: Zgrada Ministarstva spoljnih poslova) is the headquarters of the Ministry of Foreign Affairs of Serbia. It is located in Kneza Miloša Street, Belgrade, with the Government Building across Nemanjina Street.

== Name ==
The official name of the building is Palace of the Ministry of Forestry and Mining and the Ministry of Agriculture and Waterworks (Serbian: Палата Министарства шума и руда и Министарства пољопривреде и вода, romanized: Palata Ministarstva šuma i ruda i Ministarstva poljoprivrede i voda) as it was originally used by the Ministry of Forestry and Mining as well as the Ministry of Agriculture and Waterworks of the Kingdom of Yugoslavia and is registered by that name in the Registry of Cultural Heritage Properties.

After World War II, building housed the Ministry of Foreign Affairs of Yugoslavia (from 1945 to 1992) and the Ministry of Foreign Affairs of Serbia and Montenegro (from 1992 to 2006), while since 2006 it houses the Ministry of Foreign Affairs of Serbia. Therefore building is known to the general public as the Ministry of Foreign Affairs Building, and named as such in public space.

== Architecture ==
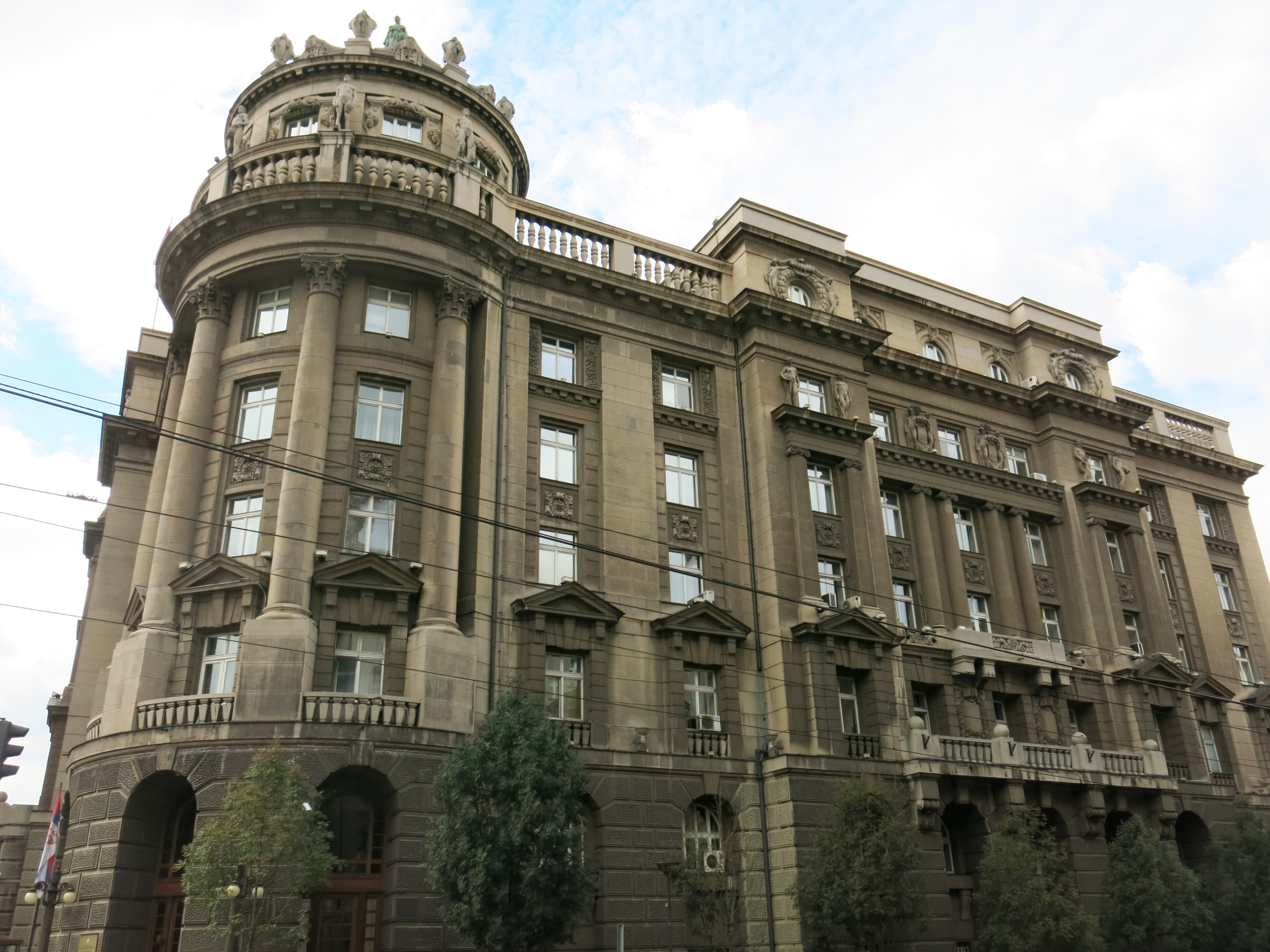
Sideview from Nemanjina Street

In 1923, the construction of the building began after the designs of the architectural bureau "The Architect", under the supervision of the eminent authors, the architects, Dragiša Brašovan and Nikola Nestorović. Since the future appearance of the object was inspired by the traditional Serbo-Byzantine style, at the initiative of the Ministry of Construction, the further construction was stopped in order not to spoil already established stylistic unity of the ambient. The further designing was assigned to one of the most important representatives of the academic style in the country, an architect of the Russian origin, Nikolay Krasnov. Without changing the basis, he made the new sketches of the facades and the plans for the luxurious interior and entire equipment. Until the end of the construction, architect Krasnov appears in the saved plans as the only author of this, spatially most comprehensive architectural creation, in the entire architectural opus. The monumental building is situated at the crossroad of the busy roads of Kneza Miloša Street and Nemanjina Street. It is marked by the exquisite dynamics of the facades, with the abundance of architectural plastic. The special contribution to the artistry of the facade was given by the works of the prominent sculptors Petar Palavičini. Dragomir Arambašić and Živojin Lukić. The relief and the free standing sculptures (male and female), symbolize the activities related to the offices of the ministries located in this building. The personification of the Forestry and the Reaper stand on the tops of the domes, while the Mining, Animal Husbandry, Vine Cultivation and many others are compositionally integrated with the rest parts of the object.

The Ministry of Forestry and Mining and the Ministry of Agriculture and Waterworks has been designated as the cultural property.

== See also ==
- List of buildings in Belgrade
- Diplomatic Archives of the Ministry of Foreign Affairs of Serbia
