= General Staff Building, Belgrade =

Complex of government buildings in Belgrade, Serbia

General Staff Building
- Зграда Генералштаба
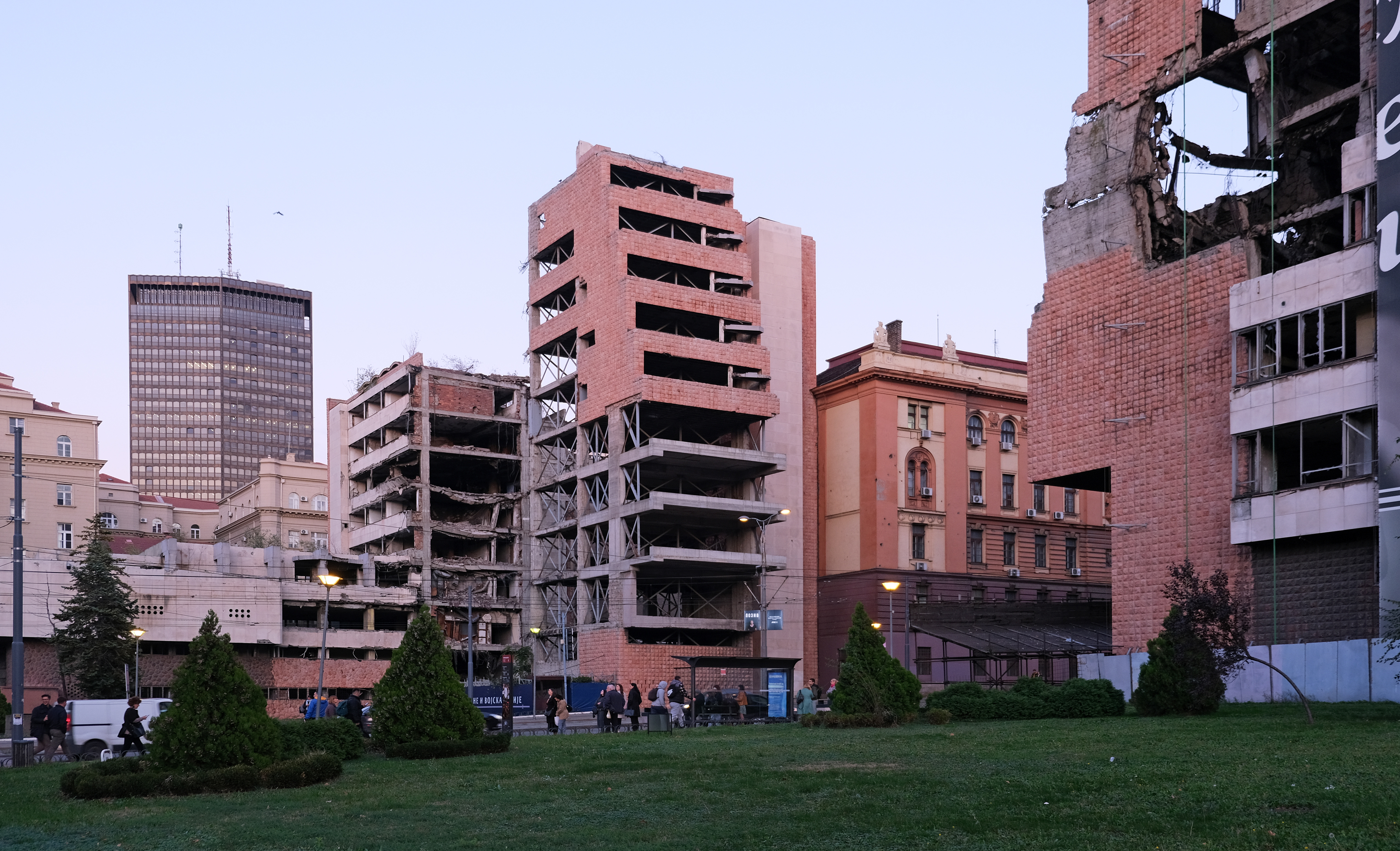
- Heavily damaged "Building A" of the building complex, semi-demolished with the street-side face restored, 2023

General information
- Status: Damaged / partially used
- Type: Complex of government buildings
- Architectural style: Modern
- Location: Belgrade, Serbia
- Coordinates: 44°48′20.2″N 20°27′40.5″E
- Construction started: 1955
- Completed: 1965
- Closed: 1999 (destroyed)
- Owner: Government of Serbia

Technical details
- Floor area: 49,235 m^{2} (529,960 sq ft) (pre-1999)

Design and construction
- Architect: Nikola Dobrović

The General Staff Building (Serbian: Зграда Генералштаба, Zgrada Generalštaba) is a complex of government buildings, that formerly housed the Federal Secretariat of People's Defence of Yugoslavia and the General Staff of the Yugoslav People's Army, now partially housing the Ministry of Defence of Serbia (in the non-damaged part, tower of "Building B"). It is located in Savski Venac, Belgrade.

The complex was heavily damaged during the NATO bombing of Yugoslavia in 1999 and was left largely derelict. In 2025, the Government of Serbia made an agreement with a company owned by Jared Kushner to lease them the land so that the buildings can be demolished and replaced by a hotel complex named "Trump Tower," but Kushner withdrew from this agreement following public pressure from protesters in December of the same year.

== Name ==
The official name of the building is Federal Secretariat of People's Defence Building (Serbian: Зграда Савезног секретариjaта за народну одбрану, Zgrada Saveznog sekretarijata za narodnu odbranu), as it was originally used by the Federal Secretariat of People's Defence of the Socialist Federal Republic of Yugoslavia, and is registered by that name in the Registry of Cultural Heritage Properties. From 1992 until 1999 it was used by the Federal Ministry of Defence of the Federal Republic of Yugoslavia.

== History ==
The complex of buildings, intended for the headquarters of the Federal Secretariat of People's Defence of Yugoslavia and the General Staff of the Yugoslav People's Army, was built from 1955 to 1965.

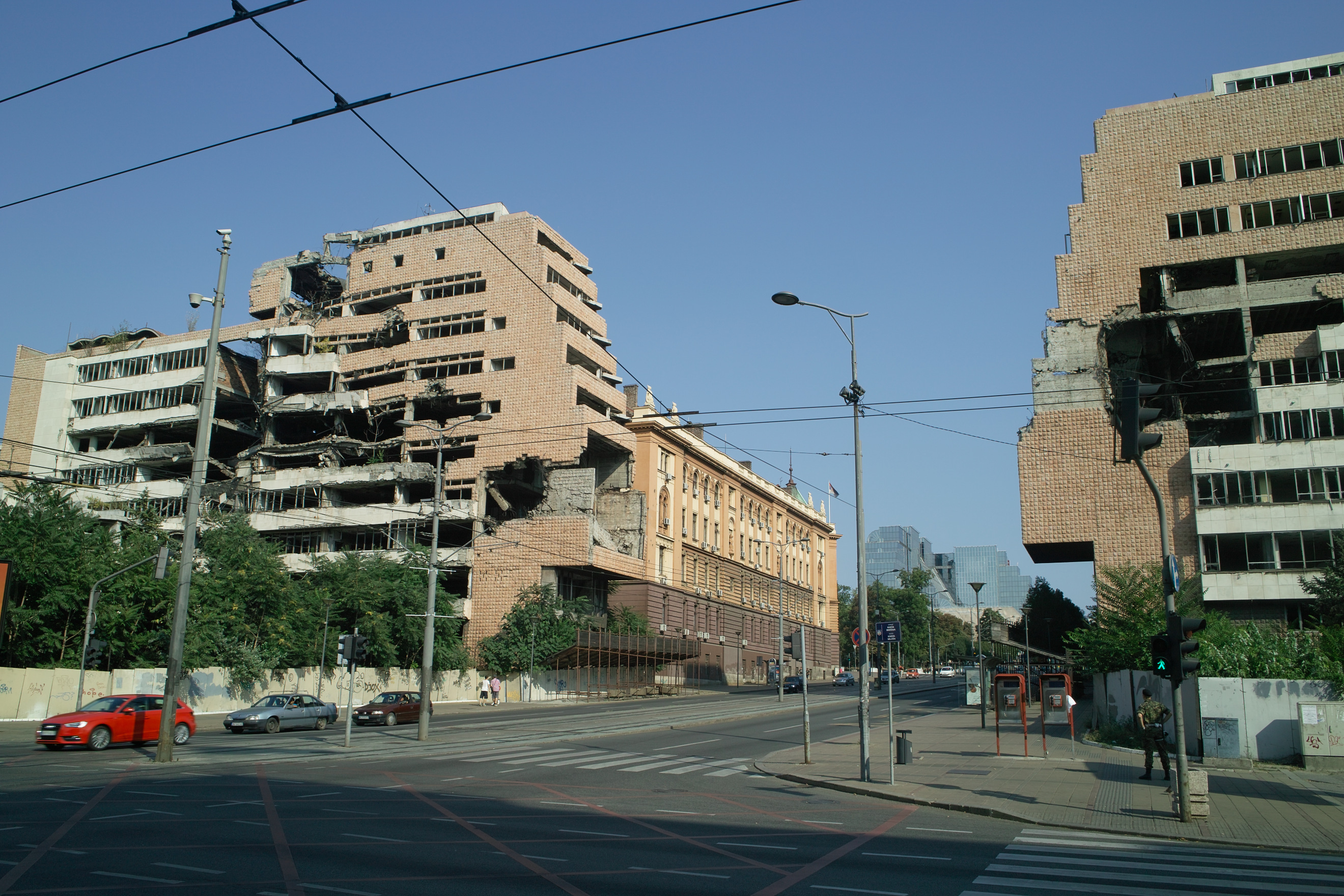
The complex in 2013

On 29 April 1999, during the NATO bombing of Yugoslavia, the complex was bombed twice in the space of fifteen minutes. Deserted at the time, the bombing was largely seen as symbolic due to the complex's representation of the state, rather than for immediate tangible purposes. It was bombed once again nine days later, around midnight on 7 May 1999.

Except for removal of the entrance annex of the "Building B" in 2014, the complex has not been repaired since and are Belgrade's most famous ruins.

In 2015, the clearing of rubble from "Building A" was conducted, aiming to stabilize the structure. Around 5,000 square meters of "Building A's" central structure was entirely demolished, and the concrete structural beams of the street-side face were repoured.

In 2017, the Government of Serbia circulated plans for demolishing the remaining parts of the "Building A" in order to eventually rebuild it to its original appearance. The Association of Serbian Architects launched an initiative to establish the structure as a UNESCO World Heritage Site, also stating that the government of Serbia wanted to remove it from the Registry of Cultural Properties, but due to the long legal procedure chose the other path. It condemned the government decision and marked the potential demolition of "Building A" as a "definitive loss of our culture", declaring it a "monument of suffering and brutality of NATO forces". In 2015, on the 16th anniversary of the beginning of the NATO bombing of Serbia, the Serbian government organized a ceremony in front of the complex, which some observers interpreted as the evidence that the ruins have indeed become a de facto war monument.

There have been several other proposals for the building since then, including turning the building into a hotel. The Prime Minister of Serbia at the time, Aleksandar Vučić, announced that there were plans for the construction of a monument of Stefan Nemanja and a museum of medieval Serbia at the site of the "Building A". This idea was later scrapped as the monument was instead placed at Sava Square.

In March 2024, Aleksandar Jovanović stated that the government was planning to release a memorandum that would effectively give away the buildings to American offshore companies Kushner Realty and Atlantic Incubation Partners LLC, registered to Jonathan Kushner, cousin of Jared Kushner, a son-in-law of President of the United States Donald Trump. The Minister for Construction and Infrastructure Goran Vesić confirmed that he received authorization from the Serbia's government at a public meeting to sign a memorandum that the complex will be leased for 99 years to American offshore companies. The Institute for the Protection of Cultural Monuments of the City of Belgrade announced that the building has the status of a cultural property, and it had not received any official document proposing the abolition of said status. Later on, Jared Kushner published renderings that showed a luxury complex on the site of the buildings. In response, the Ecological Uprising political party announced the launch of a petition to prevent its sale, and to build a memorial centre dedicated to the victims of the bombing on the site instead.

In May 2024, the government approved a contract with Kushner in partnership with Richard Grenell for plans to build a $500 million luxury hotel on the site. On 15 November 2024, the government made a decision to remove the building from the Central Register of Immovable Cultural Heritage, essentially allowing the plan to move forward. The decision became effective on 23 November 2024. On January 16, 2025, Kushner announced that a Trump hotel would be built in place of the Yugoslav Ministry of Defence Building. The following day, the Republic Institute for the Protection of Cultural Monuments stated it would not remove the Defence Building from the Central Register, citing the law on cultural heritage, which says that for a cultural heritage site to be removed, it must either cease to exist or be completely destroyed. In October 2024, Europa Nostra nominated the building for the 7 Most Endangered monuments and heritage sites in Europe due to attempts at demolishing the remaining structure.

On 7 November 2025, the National Assembly of Serbia voted 130–40 to pass a law allowing for the complex's redevelopment. On 11 November, students of Faculty of Applied Arts, Faculty of Architecture and Faculty of Philosophy held a protest titled "We Are the Living Wall" in front of the building to oppose the proposed demolition of the site. On 3 December the National Assembly passed "authentic interpretation" of the law which removed heritage protection to the entire surrounding urban zone. Transparency Serbia characterizes the "authentic interpretation" as "triple legal violence" alleging that it uses an unconstitutional, retroactive mechanism to annul heritage protections and bypass the separation of powers to facilitate private investment.

In May 2025, the Office of the Public Prosecutor for Organized Crime (TOK) launched an investigation into the procedural handling of the case and arrested Goran Vasić, the acting director of the Republic Institute for the Protection of Cultural Monuments. Prosecutors alleged that Vasić submitted the forged documents to the Ministry of Culture without the participation or consent of the Institute's professional conservationists. During his hearing Vasić confessed to all charges. In December 2025 TOK filed an indictment against the Minister of Culture, Nikola Selaković for alleged abuse of official position and falsification of an official document. Prosecutors demanded three-year prison sentence for Selaković. On 15 December 2025 Affinity Global Development in a statement to Wall Street Journal said "Because meaningful projects should unite rather than divide, and out of respect for the people of Serbia and the City of Belgrade, we are withdrawing our application and stepping aside at this time".

== Architecture ==
The building was designed by Serbian architect, Nikola Dobrović. It is located in the downtown Belgrade, split in two by Nemanjina Street. Its design was meant to resemble a canyon of the Sutjeska river, where one of the most significant battles of World War II in Yugoslavia was fought, with the street as a river dividing the two monumental, gradually completed tracts. As Nemanjina Street comes up the hill from the Belgrade Main Railway Station, the two parts of the building form a symbolic gate.

In addition to cascading forms, facades are characterized by the application of contrasting materials - robust, brown-red stone from Kosjerić and white marble slabs from the island of Brač. The most striking visual motif representing the window bars on the facades, designed in the spirit of late modernism.

The northern part of the complex, standing across the Government Building in Kneza Miloša Street, is named "Building A" with area of 12,654 square meters. The southern part of the complex, across the Nemanjina Street, is named "Building B" with area of 36,581 square meters.

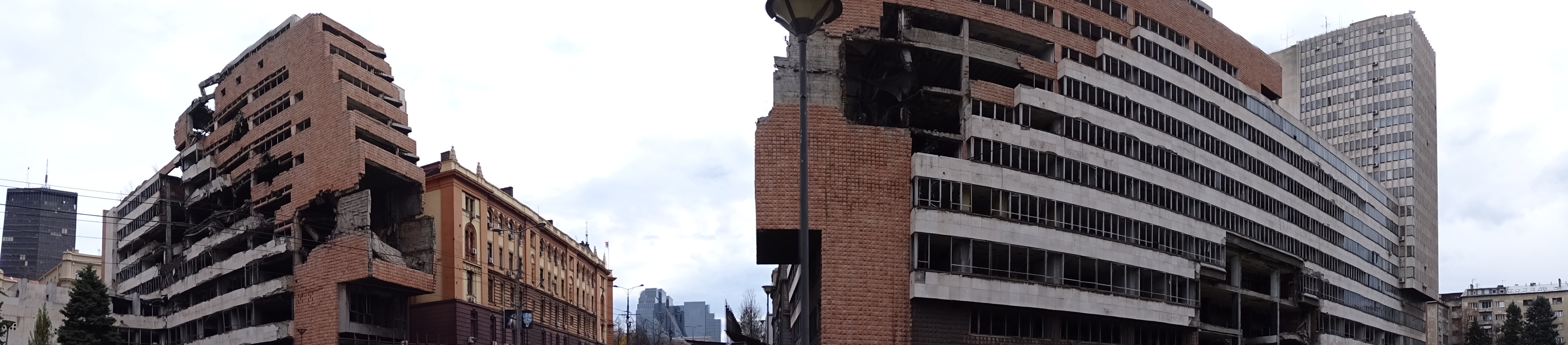
Derelict "Building A", on the left, and partly-damaged "Building B" (tower currently housing the headquarters of the Ministry of Defence), on the right

== See also ==
- List of buildings in Belgrade
