= Hammam of Prince Miloš =

Turkish bath in Belgrade, Serbia

Hamam of Prince Miloš
- Амам кнеза Милоша; Amam kneza Miloša
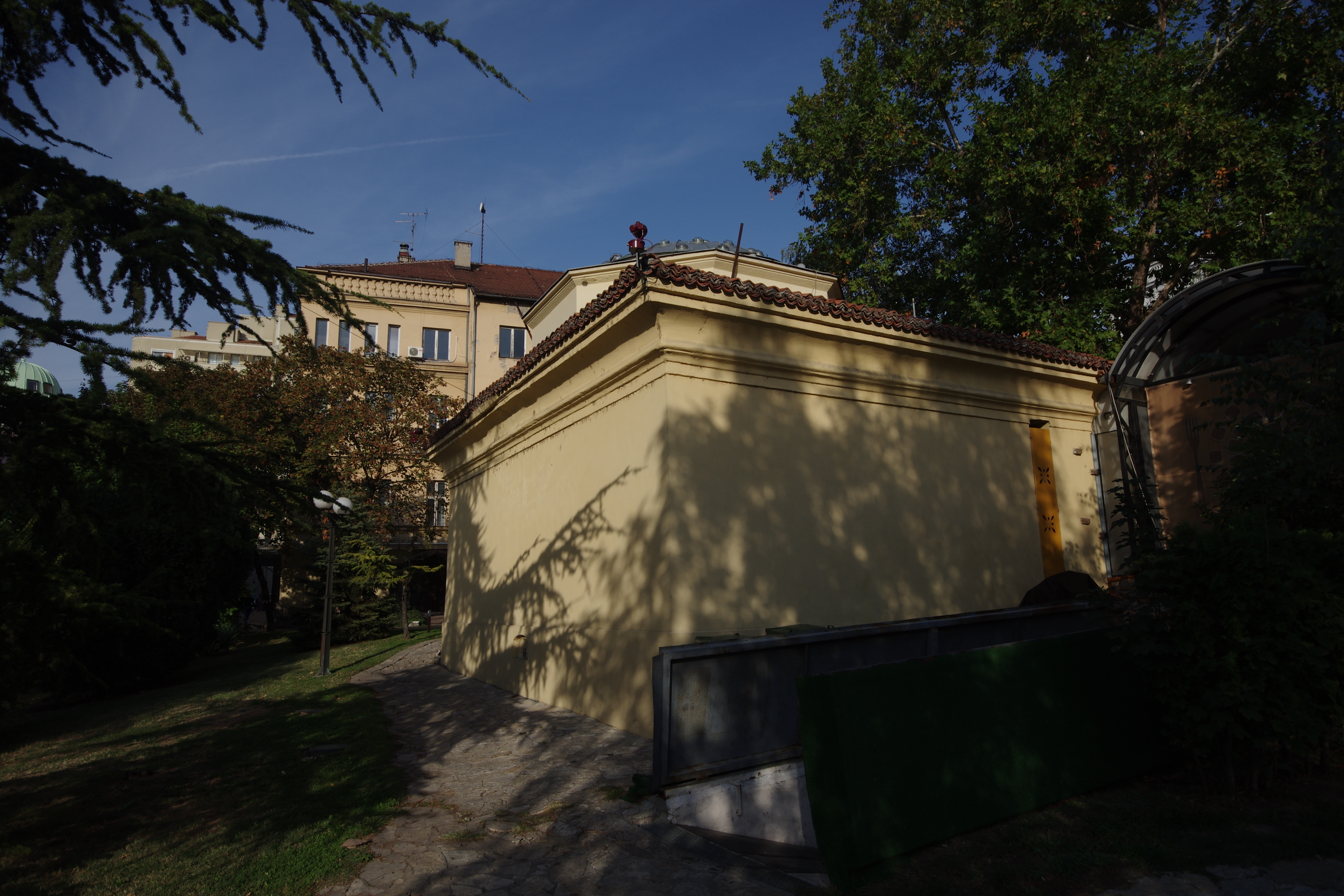
- Hamam of Prince Miloš
- Interactive map of Hamam of Prince Miloš
- Location: Belgrade, Serbia
- Coordinates: 44.807595°N 20.459888°E
- Designer: Hadži Nikola Živković
- Type: Cultural monument
- Beginning date: 1836
- Completion date: 1837
- Dedicated to: Miloš Obrenović
- Website: http://beogradskonasledje.rs/

Hammam of Prince Miloš is the former Hammam (Turkish bathhouse) in Belgrade, the capital of Serbia. Built in 1836-37, it was declared a cultural monument in 1948.

== Location ==
The building is located in the modern Park Gavrilo Princip, until 2017 known as the Financial Park. It is situated just north of the building of the Government of Serbia, west of the building of the Finance Ministry and south of the Ascencion Church.

== History ==
Hammam of Prince Miloš was built in 1836-37. It was projected as the bath of the princely Lower Court and was part of the court complex along the Topčider Road, designed for the prince's sons Milan and Mihailo Obrenović. The court's garden evolved into the modern park. The court buildings were later handed over to the Finance Ministry and the bath is today the only surviving part of the entire complex. It was declared a cultural monument on 20 April 1948.

In January 2021 it was announced that the object will be returned under the city authority. Reconstruction of the hammam and its adaptation into the cultural center was planned. Also announced was demolition of the building at 14 Admirala Geprata, which separated the bath from the street. New planned building will have "transparent" ground floor, which would allow view on the bath, which is not visible from any of the surrounding streets due to its location in the park and center of the block.

== Architecture ==
It is believed that the author of the bath was Hadži Nikola Živković, a royal architect during the first reign of Prince Miloš (1817-39), who constructed all royal buildings in the period, like Princess Ljubica's Residence (in Kosančićev Venac) and Residence of Prince Miloš (in Topčider). The concept is a typical Turkish bathhouse design of the period. It is a ground-level building with the hearth room and a protruding chimney. The building is conceived as an autonomous structure of a rectangular basis. Although the dimensions of the building are not large, it has all the component parts of a hammam - šadrvan (fountain), kapaluk (cloakroom), halvat (large private room), hazna (attendant's room) and ćulhan (boiler room). The main room, which was used for bathing and rest, is vaulted with a shallow dome, constructed by the concentric placing of bricks. A particular detail of the dome and the vaults are the lighting openings, covered by glass bubbles.

== See more ==
- List of cultural properties on Savski venac
- List of cultural monuments in Belgrade
