= Church of the Ascension, Belgrade =

Serbian Orthodox church in Belgrade

Coordinates: 44.807989°N 20.461605°E

The Church of the Ascension (Serbian: Вазнесењска црква, romanized: Vaznesenjska crkva) is a Serbian Orthodox church in downtown Belgrade, the capital of Serbia. It still uses the bell under which the Hatisheriff of 1830 was announced, by which the Ottoman Empire granted autonomy to Serbia. The church was declared a cultural monument in 1969.

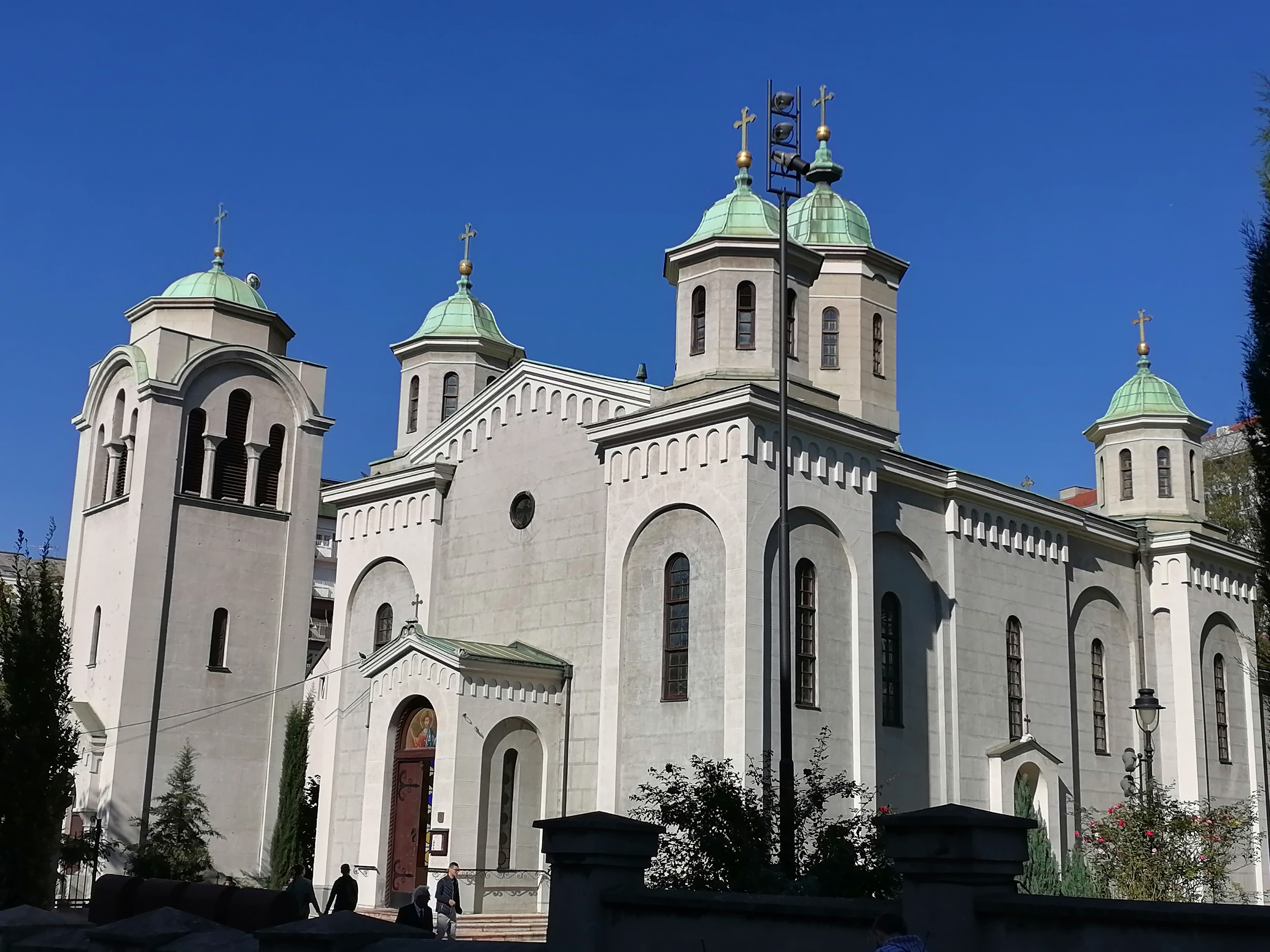

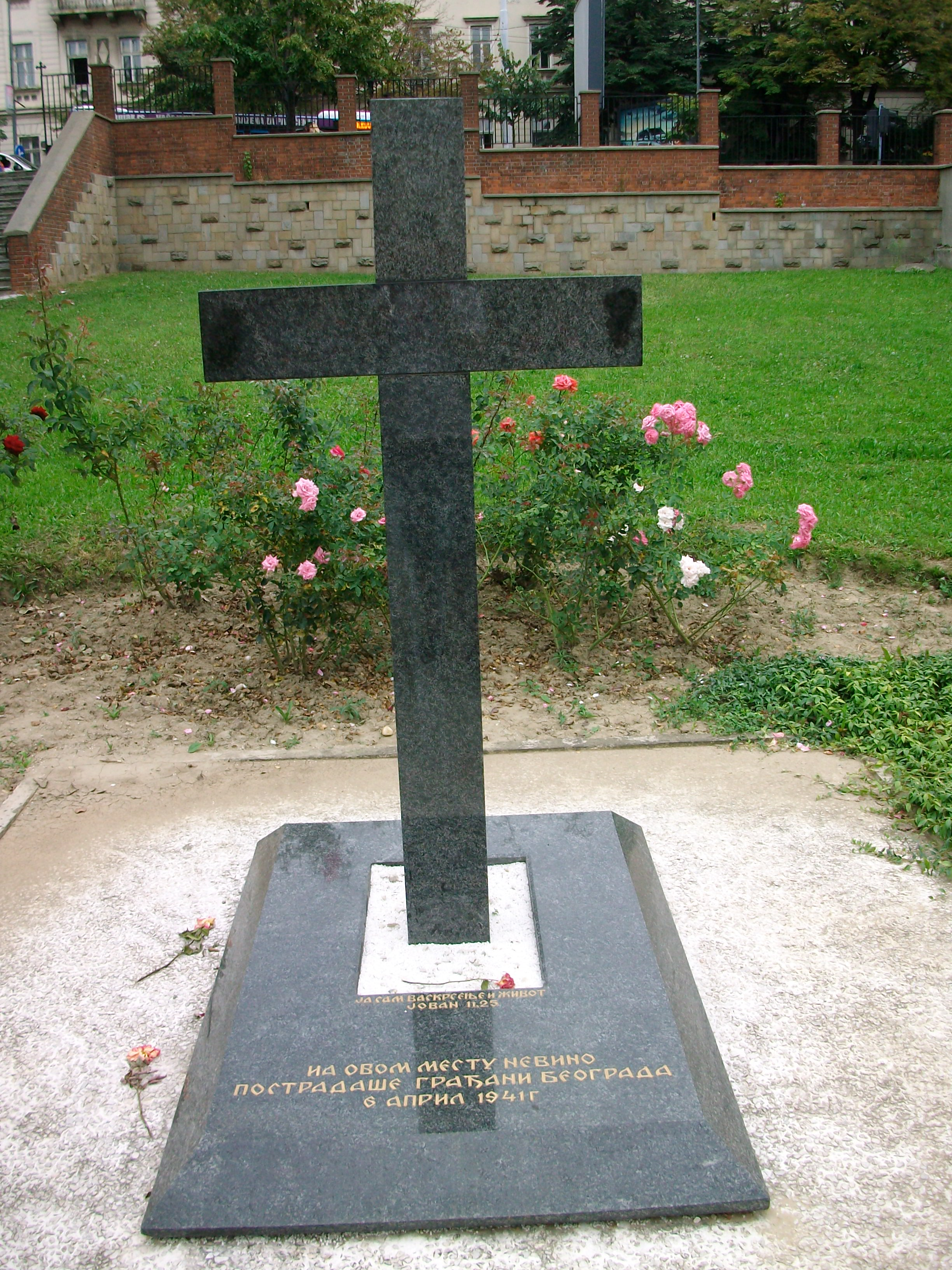
Memorial cross commemorating the killed in the 1941 air raid

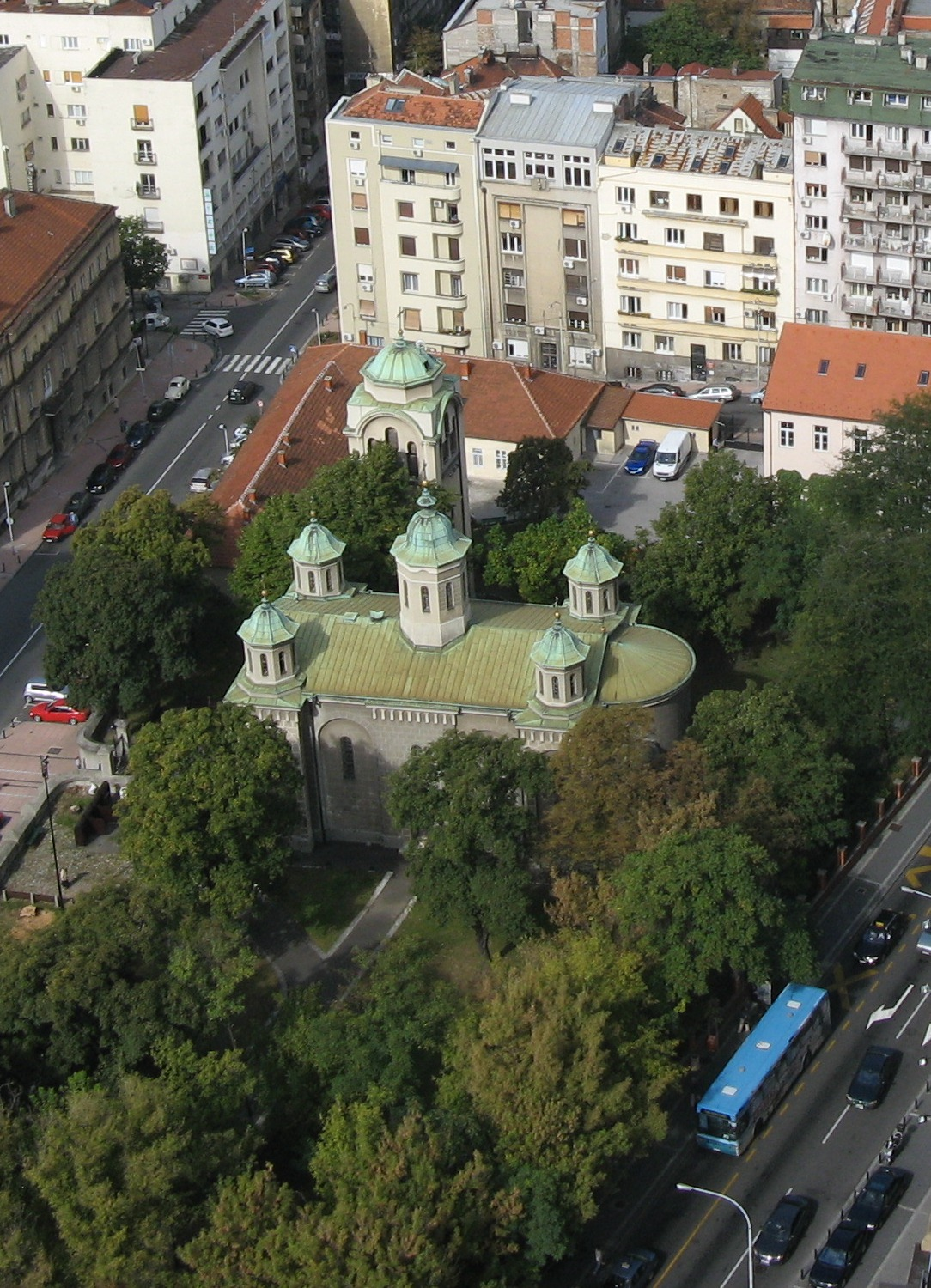
Aerial view, before the trees were cut in 2013

== Location ==
The church is located in the municipality of Savski Venac. The church complex occupies the entire block bounded by the streets of Kneza Miloša (east), Kraljice Natalije (north), Dobrinjska (west) and Admirala Geprata (south), where the church is officially situated, at No. 19. Notable buildings in the nearest vicinity include the Building of the Finance Ministry on the south, the Hammam of Prince Miloš on the southwest (both across the Admirala Geprata) and Beograđanka on the east, across the Kneza Miloša.

== History ==
As Belgrade developed in the first half of the 19th century, after the liberation from the Ottomans, St. Mark's Church, Belgrade in the neighborhood of Tašmajdan became too small to accommodate the growing number of adherents, especially those from the distant neighborhoods on the slopes above the Sava river. Additionally, a military complex was built in the area (academy, barracks) so the new church was needed for both the soldiers (who used the tent-church) and the population.

Order for construction of the church was given by Miloš Obrenović, Prince of Serbia, and Mihailo II Jovanović, Metropolitan of Belgrade, in 1860. Church was completed by 1863, mostly from the citizens' donations. As prince Miloš died in 1860, his son and heir, Mihailo Obrenović, continued the consultations with the metropolitan on the new church. It was consecrated by the Metropolitan Mihailo II in March 1863. The clergy house has been added in 1870 and was renovated in 2013.

During the withdrawal of the occupational German and Austro-Hungarian armies at the end of World War I, the soldiers looted Belgrade churches, also taking church bells from all of them, leaving only one bell at the Church of the Ascension.

Below the churchyard was one of Belgrade's air raid shelters. During the German bombing of Belgrade on 6 April 1941, bombs directly hit the churchyard, killing 200 people. A memorial marble cross commemorating the victims was built in the 1970s. It was also hit during the bombing of Belgrade by the Allies in 1944.

In April 2013, almost all trees in the churchyard were cut. Over 50 years old, tall chestnut, black locust and lime trees, were inspected as, for some time, the branches were falling off, even on the parking outside of the churchyard. The communal inspection decided that the trees were rotten and had to be cut down.

== Architecture ==
After the prince and the metropolitan agreed with the plan for the future church, developed by Pavle Stanišić and Jovan Ristić, city administration announced a bidding for the construction company. The job was awarded to Josif Štok, for the value of 5,000 Austrian ducats. Contractors were Fridrih Šlajsner and Ernest Glajzner, while the head of the construction site was Koča Z. Popović. The tin roof was laid by the Schuster company.

It was designed in the prevailing style of the period, the Romanticism. The church was patterned after the old Serbian monasteries, especially the Ravanica.

The church is known for its stairs, made from black Hungarian marble. The façade has been done in 1870 and was renovated in 2013.

== Characteristics ==
The iconostas and wall paintings were originally painted by Nikola Marković. They were later changed. Stevan Todorović has redone the icons in 1880-81 while the frescoes on the walls and under the dome are work of Andrej Bicenko, who finished the work in 1937. The frescoes were refreshed in the early 2000s which made them visible again cause they were black due to the candle smoke, while the icons and iconostas have been conserved in 2006. The original, wooden bell tower, collapsed on the bell-ringer boy and the new one was built in the 1940s.

One of the bells is the one under which the Hatisheriff of 1830 was announced, in Tašmajdan. By the Hatisheriff, the Ottoman Empire officially granted autonomy for Serbia, basically acknowledging the situation which existed since the Second Serbian Uprising in 1815. By the additional berat, the sultan also granted hereditary rights to prince Miloš. The bell was first kept in the Cathedral Church of St. Michael the Archangel. It is still used, though it has been adapted so is now operated by the electrical mechanism.

Built partially because of the military complex, Church of the Ascension served as a military church in both Serbia and, later, Yugoslavia. As the church is dedicated to the Feast of the Ascension, called in Serbian Spasovdan ("Salvation day"), which is also an official slava of the city of Belgrade, a traditional procession celebrating the day through the city's main streets starts and ends at the Church of the Ascension.

The church has a rich treasury, which includes the collections of icons, old books and goldworks and other objects from the 19th century.
