= Alfred Keller (architect) =

Austrian architect

- Born: 17 June 1875; Graz, Austria-Hungary
- Died: 8 March 1945 (aged 69); Krems an der Donau, Austria
- Occupation: Architect

Alfred Keller (17 June 1875 – 8 March 1945) was an Austrian architect. His work was part of the architecture event in the art competition at the 1932 Summer Olympics.
