= Potiorek Bridge =

Bridge in Novi Sad, Vojvodina, Serbia

Potiorek Bridge Поћореков мост Poćorekov most
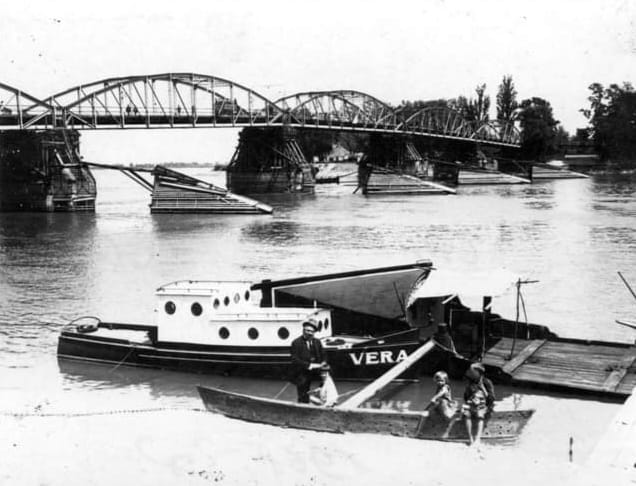
- Potiorek Bridge, 1920s
- Coordinates: 45.2570845°N 19.8569615°E
- Crossed: Danube
- Locale: Novi Sad, Vojvodina, Serbia
- Named for: Oskar Potiorek
- Preceded by: Hagen Bridge (1915–1918); Emperor Franz Joseph Bridge

Characteristics
- Design: Tied-arch bridge
- Material: Steel
- Trough construction: Steel
- Pier construction: Wood
- Total length: 384 m
- Width: 6.7 m
- Height: 13 m
- Traversable?: Yes
- Piers in water: 4
- No. of lanes: 2

History
- Construction start: December 1914; 110 years ago
- Construction end: March 1915; 110 years ago
- Opened: March 1915; 110 years ago
- Collapsed: 18 February 1924; 101 years ago (destroyed by river ice)

Potiorek Bridge (Serbian: Поћореков мост, Poćorekov most) was a bridge on the Danube river in Novi Sad, current day Vojvodina, Serbia. Built in March 1915, it lasted until 18 February 1924 when it collapsed from ice sheet damage and was completely demolished in the summer of the same year.

== Name ==
Despite the bridge never having an official name, in military communications it was referred to as Potiorek Bridge, named after Oskar Potiorek, commander of the Austro-Hungarian forces in the failed Serbian Campaign of 1914.

== Location ==
The bridge from the Bačka side of Novi Sad ended where the modern Miloša Bajića street is located, near the old silk factory.

== History ==
In August 1914, after the Austro-Hungarian forces were dealt a defeat at the Battle of Cer by Serbian forces, preparations for a new offensive began immediately. Many soldiers and war equipment arrived in Novi Sad. The existing railway and pontoon bridge could no longer meet armies demands, so the construction of a larger bridge (planned several years earlier) started in December 1914. The bridge was 261 meters long with a maximum span of 384 meters, 6.7 meters wide and 13 meters high. It had a steel framework construction of 5 arches built on top of six wooden piers (four river piers, 2 coastal piers) grounded by sand and earth. It was conceptualized as the first road bridge for heavy wheeled vehicles in Novi Sad.

At the end of First World War, the citizens of Novi Sad and the Serbian army saved the bridge from destruction at the hands of the retreating Austro-Hungarian forces. Through this bridge the Serbian army, commanded by major Vojislav Bugarski entered the liberated Novi Sad on 9 November 1918. The bridge was under constant military protection, with military engineers and craftsmen maintaining it. The control of the bridge was handed to the city in 1921 by the First Military District.

The winder of 1924 was extremely cold, resulting in the Danube to frozen up. At the beginning of January, sheets of ice began to flow downstream. The technical department of the Ban Administration asked the First Military District for explosives to destroy the sheets of ice, but were unsuccessful in their attempt. The explosives only made holes on the larger sheets of ice that continued to press on the bridge's wooden piers. The bridge gave in the early hours of 18 February 1924, the ice sheets damaging one of the piers resulting in the collapse of two metal arches that rested on it. The bridge was completely demolished by the summer of 1924. A temporary pontoon bridge was construction until the completion of the Prince Tomislav Bridge in 1928.

== Gallery ==
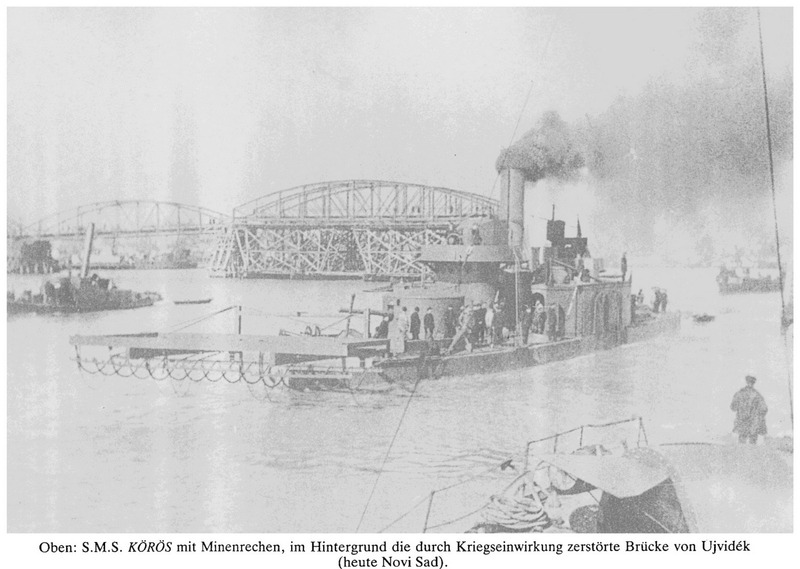
Mine removal near the Potiorek Bridge, 1918

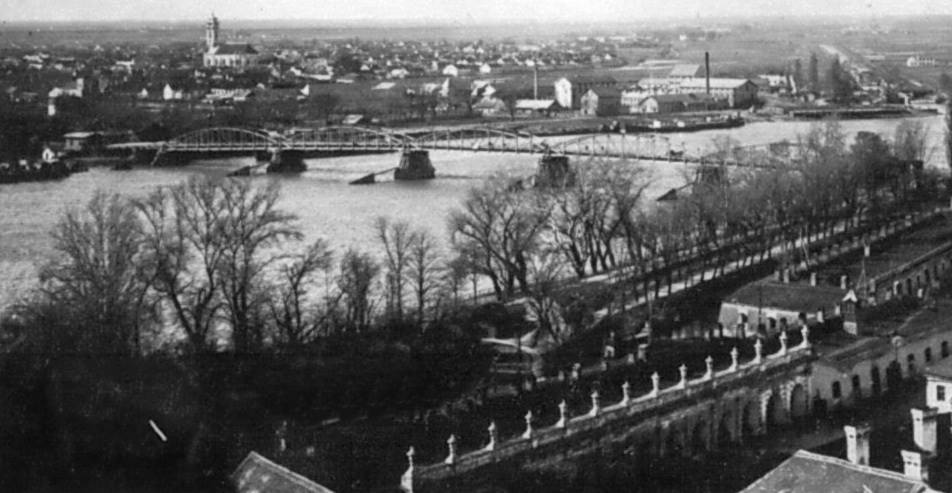
Potiorek Bridge as seen from the Petrovaradin Fortress, 1920s

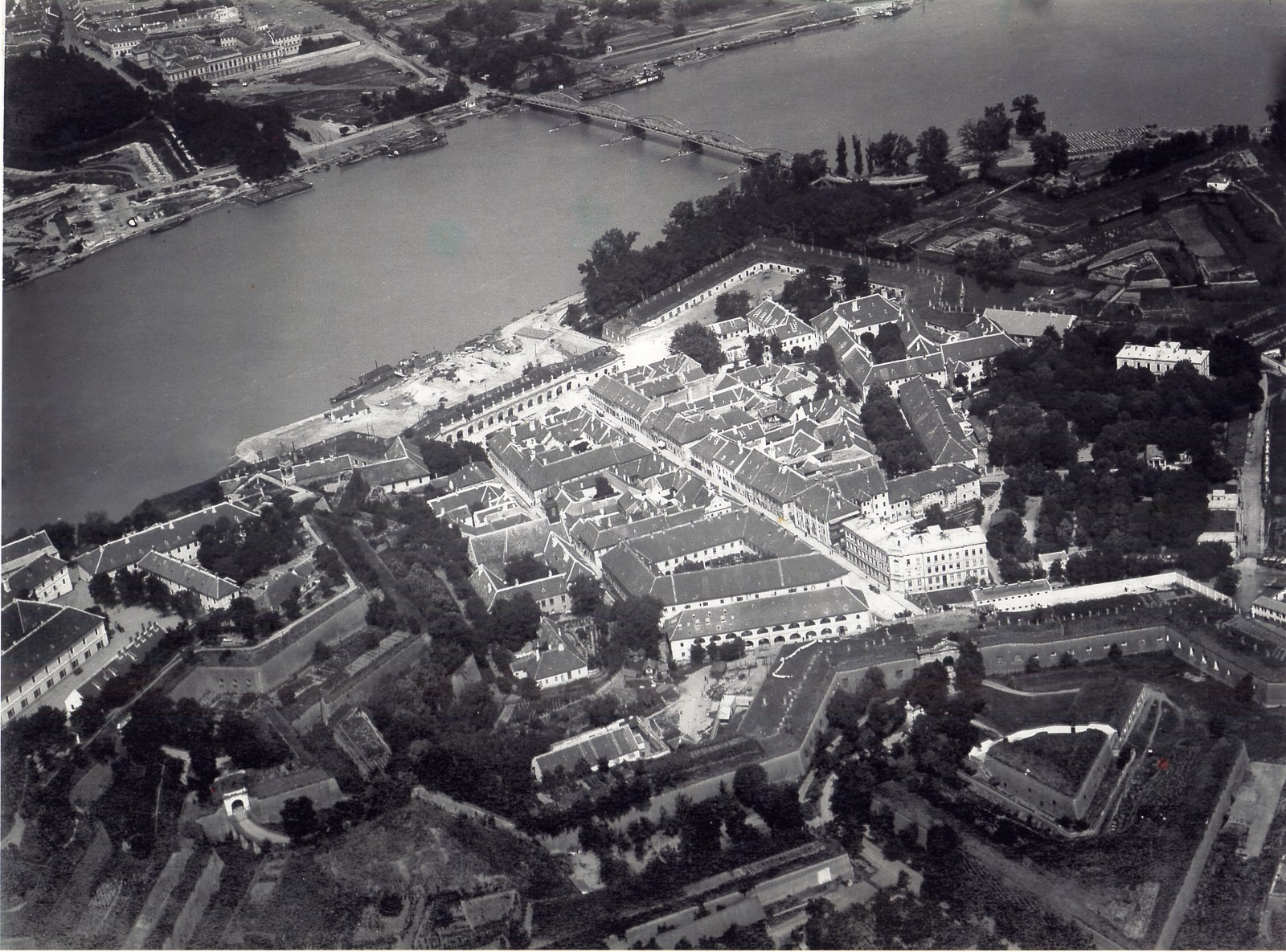
Potierek Bridge next to the Petrovaradin Podgrađe, 1920s

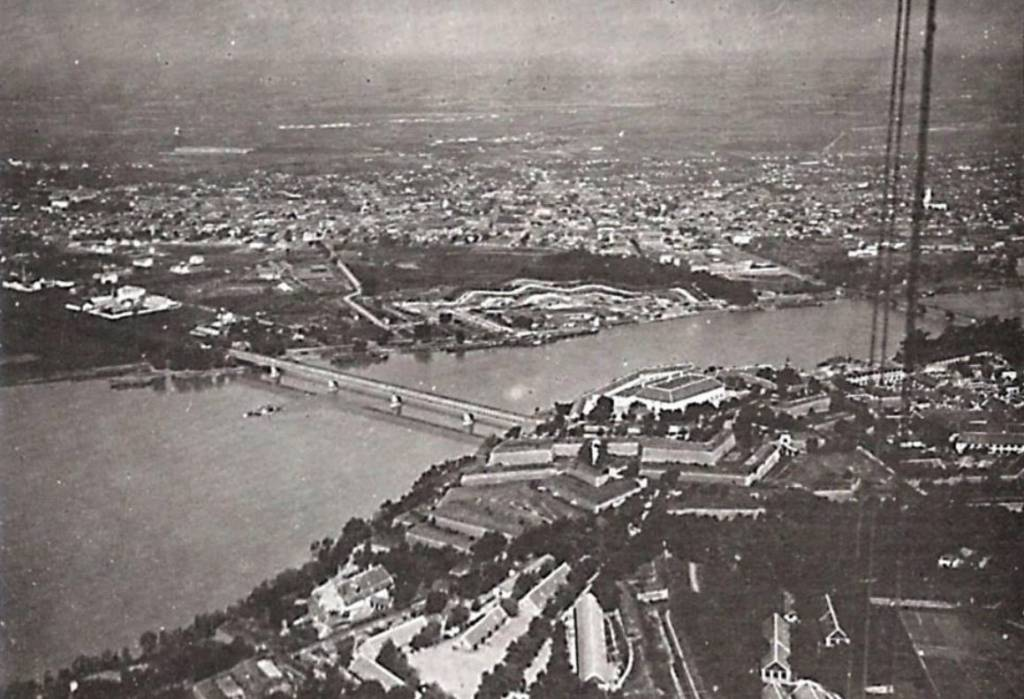
Potiorek Bridge, 1920s

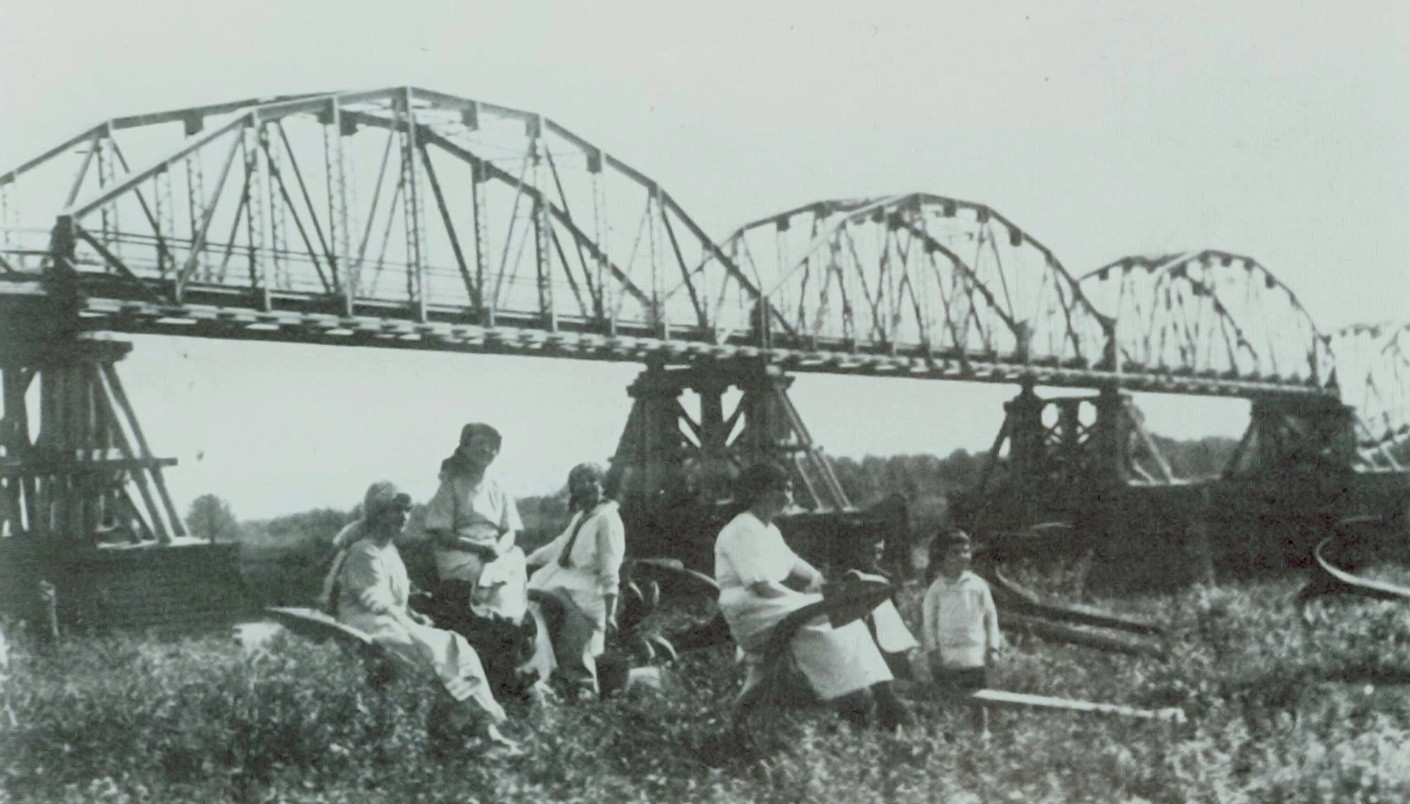
Potiorek Bridge, 1920s

== See also ==
- List of bridges in Serbia
- List of crossings of the Danube
