= Varadin Bridge =

Bridge in Novi Sad, Vojvodina, Serbia

Varadin Bridge Варадински мост Varadinski most
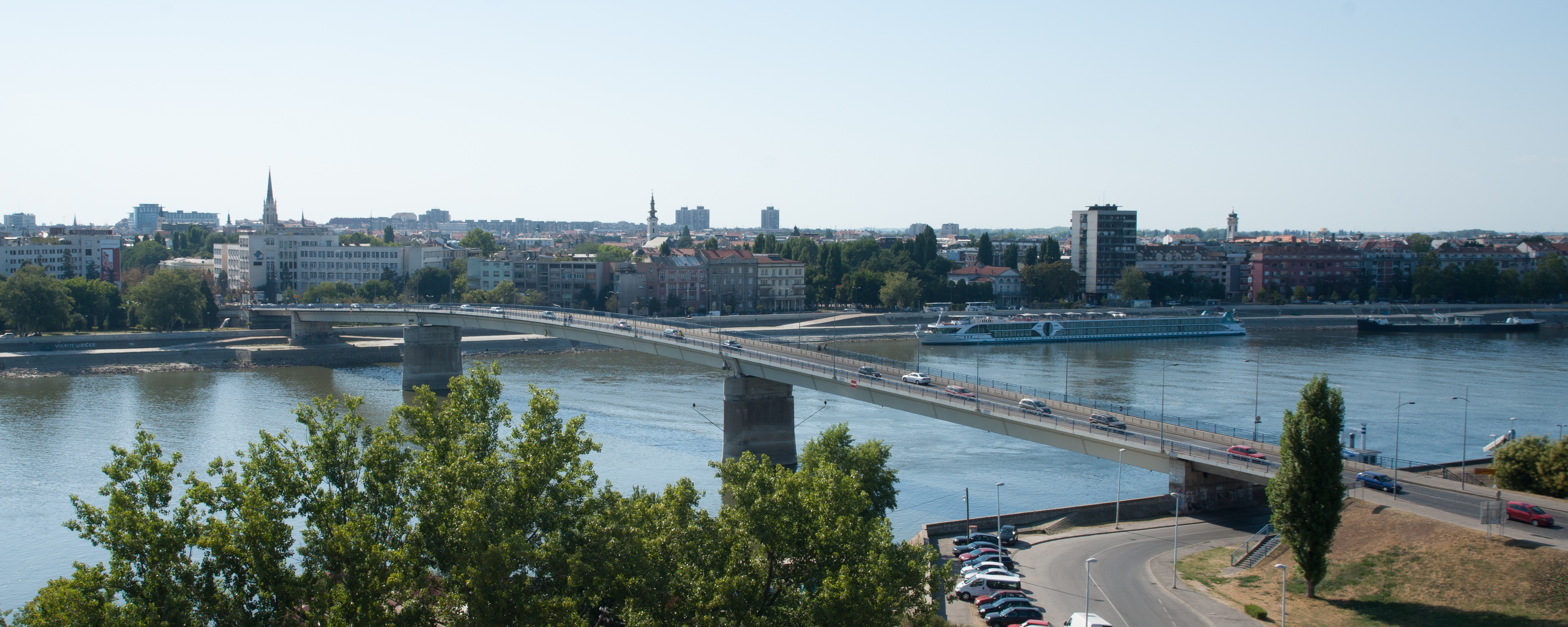
- Varadin Bridge in Novi Sad, August 2013
- Coordinates: 45.254653°N 19.857472°E
- Crossed: Danube
- Locale: Novi Sad, Vojvodina, Serbia
- Official name: Marshal Tito Bridge (1946–1991) (Old bridge); Varadin Bridge (1991–) (Old and new bridges)
- Named for: Josip Broz Tito (1946–1991) (Old bridge)
- Preceded by: Prince Andrew Bridge (Old bridge); Liberty Bridge (New bridge)
- Followed by: Žeželj Bridge

Characteristics
- Design: Truss bridge (Old bridge); Box girder bridge (New bridge)
- Material: Steel
- Trough construction: Steel
- Pier construction: Reinforced concrete
- Total length: 344 m (Old bridge); 304 m (New bridge)
- Traversable?: Yes
- Piers in water: 2
- No. of lanes: 2

History
- Engineering design by: Miodrag Živković, Panta Jakovljević, Sava Atanacković (Old bridge); Mašinska Industrija Niš (New bridge)
- Construction start: 13 August 1945; 80 years ago (Old bridge); January 2000; 26 years ago (New bridge)
- Construction end: 20 January 1946; 80 years ago (Old bridge); 1 September 2000; 25 years ago (New bridge)
- Opened: 20 January 1946; 80 years ago (Old bridge); 1 September 2000; 25 years ago (New bridge)
- Collapsed: 1 April 1999; 26 years ago (Old bridge)

Location
- Interactive map of Varadin Bridge

Varadin Bridge (Serbian: Варадински мост, Varadinski most) is a bridge over the Danube river in Novi Sad, Vojvodina, Serbia. The current bridge built in 2000, replaced the original bridge destroyed during NATO bombardment on 1 April 1999.

== Name ==
The bridge's name, Varadin, just like the name of Petrovaradin, derives from the Hungarian words for fortress (vár) and town (város), along with the Turkish word for faith (din). The name of the old Varadin Bridge, prior to 1991, was Marshal Tito Bridge (Serbian Cyrillic: Мост Маршала Тита, romanized: Most Maršala Tita), named after Josip Broz Tito. During the opening of the new bridge, it was named Varadin Rainbow (Serbian: Варадинска дуга, Varadinska duga) due to the bridges arch and rainbow night lighting. This name would later change to the current one.

== Location ==
New Varadin Bridge was built on top of the piers of the Old Varadin Bridge, situated at the same location as the previous Prince Tomislav Bridge, at the end of Mihalja Pupina Boulevard (then named Maršala Tita Boulevard), connecting to Petrovaradin Old Town with Beogradska street.

== History ==
=== Old Varadin Bridge ===
After the Second World War, the city of Novi Sad lacked any permanent bridges across the Danube, using a temporary wooden pontoon bridge. The construction of a new bridge on the location of the destroyed Prince Tomislav Bridge was imperative. Construction started on 13 August 1945 and was finished in record 160 days on 20 January 1946. The construction was done by German prisoners of war, which were later freed as a reward for completing the bridge. Marshal Tito Bridge was intended to be a temporary solution, planned to last only 5 years, however the bridge would remain for 53 years. It was built in the form of a single truss beam, repurposing the existing piers of the Prince Tomislav Bridge. The bridge was also notable for being the first permanent steel bridge built since the end of the Second World War in Europe.

Prior to the construction of the Žeželj Bridge in 1961, the bridge also functioned as the main railway bridge across the Danube. The last train over the Marshal Tito Bridge crossed in 1962, after which the railway was dismantled from the bridge, as well as the Štrosmajerova street and within Petrovaradin Old Town. On the last train car that crossed the bridge a poster was placed that had "Jel Vam žao što se rastajemo?" (Are you sorry that we're departing?) written on it.

Like most communist streets and neighborhoods in Novi Sad, the bridge would change its name from Marshal Tito to Varadin in 1991.

Due to its importance as a major traffic artery connecting Bačka and Syrmian end of the city, the bridge was destroyed at the early days of the NATO bombing of Novi Sad on 1 April 1999. Oleg M. Nasov, a 29 year old citizen of Novi Sad, died due to the bombing while riding his bike near the bridge. Citizens of Novi Sad would pay tribute to Oleg and the destroyed bridge by placing flowers on the Novi Sad end of the bridge. A plaque dedicated to Oleg Nasov would later be placed on the new bridge's entrance. The famous Yugoslav sculptor, Jovan Soldatović, would open up an exhibition at the ruins of the Varadin Bridge on 14 April, at the height of the intensive bombing of Novi Sad and Yugoslavia. The exhibition opened in front of the Novi Sad Club by Dr Aleksandar Lučić. The set up an exhibition composed from the installation Dođe li rat – odoše ljudi (made in 1972) at the Novi Sad side of the bridge's ruins.

=== New Varadin Bridge ===
Following the NATO bombing of Yugoslavia, just like the previous bridge, a new bridge was urgently needed. The remnants of the old bridge were cleaned up at the end of 1999. Construction started at the beginning of 2000, with Mašinska Industrija Niš working day and night, in parallel with the construction of Boško Peroševič Bridge. The bridge is of a box girder design. It repurposed the bridge piers of previous Varadin and Prince Tomislav bridges, adding additional concrete that elevates the road span for ship traversal, which gave the bridge its signature arch. The bridge was completed in September 2000, before the 2000 Yugoslavian general elections and was opened for traffic in October of that year.

== Gallery ==
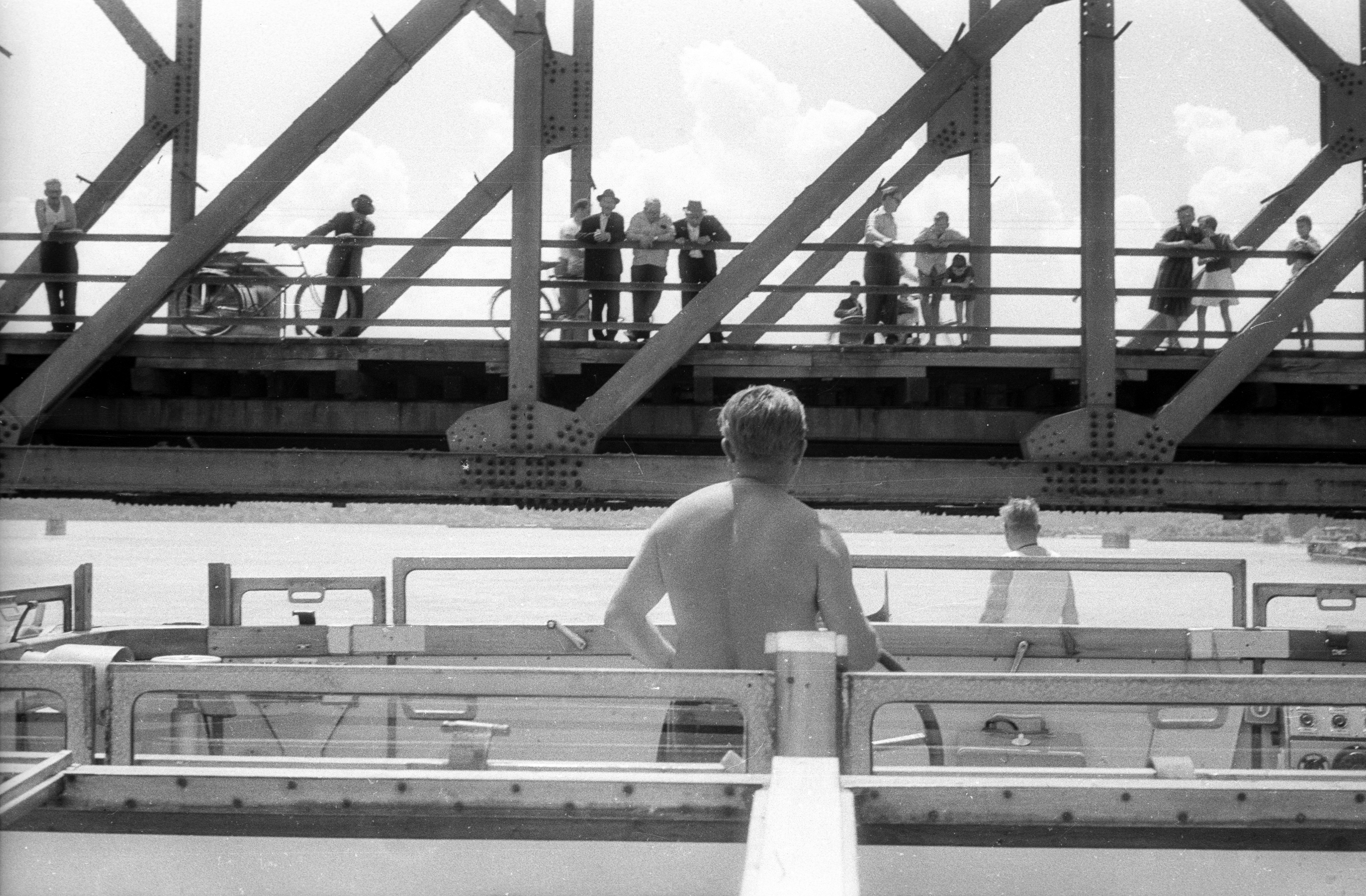
Marshal Tito Bridge steel frame, 1964

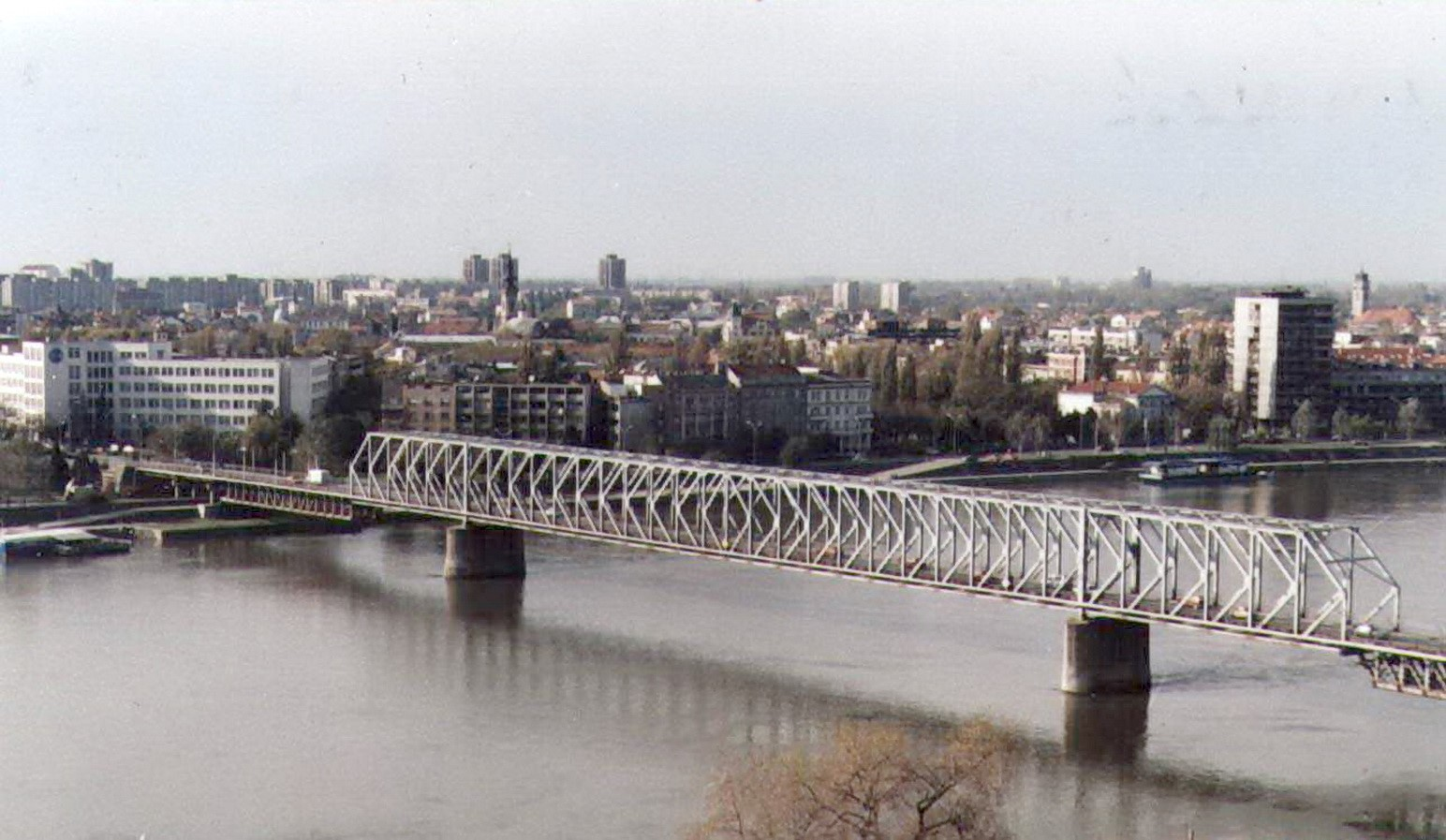
Marshal Tito Bridge in Novi Sad, later renamed into Varadin Bridge in 1991

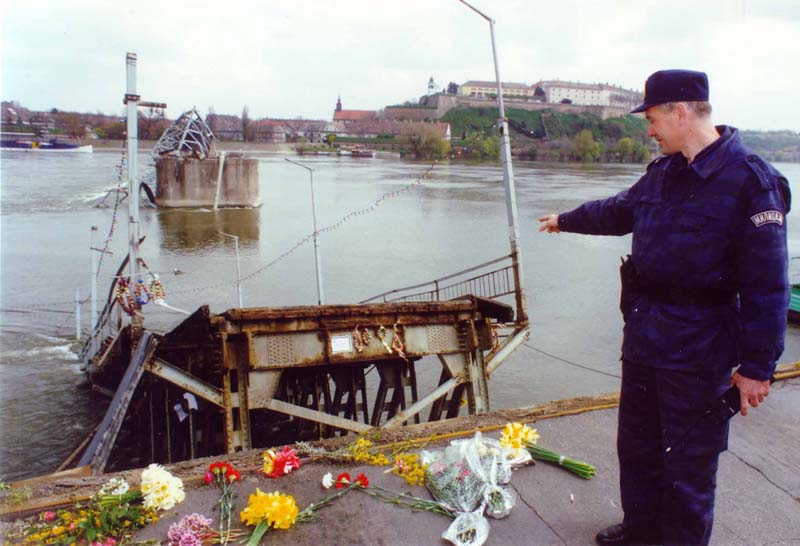
Destroyed Bridge, 1999

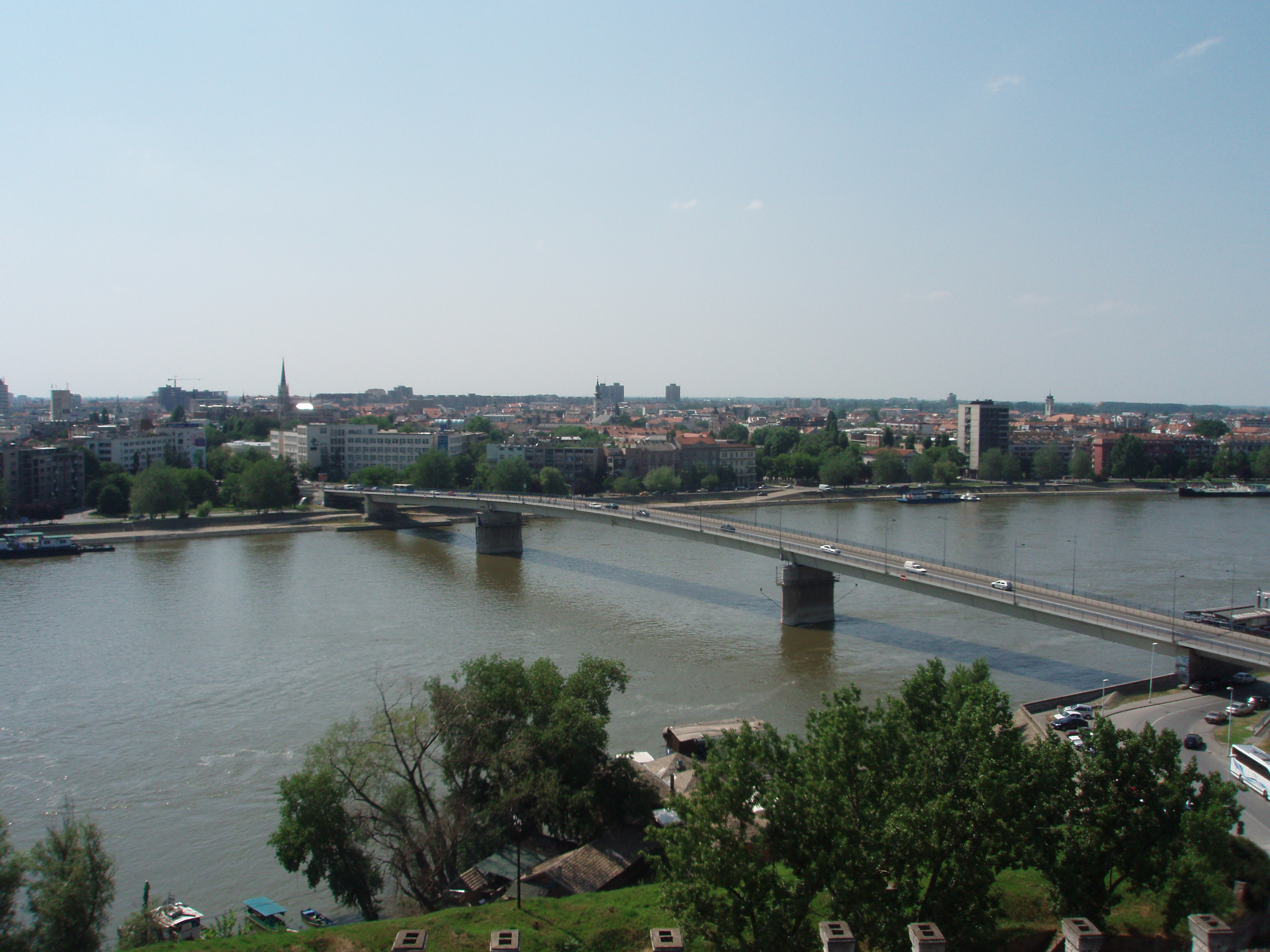
New Varadin Bridge in Novi Sad, May 2009

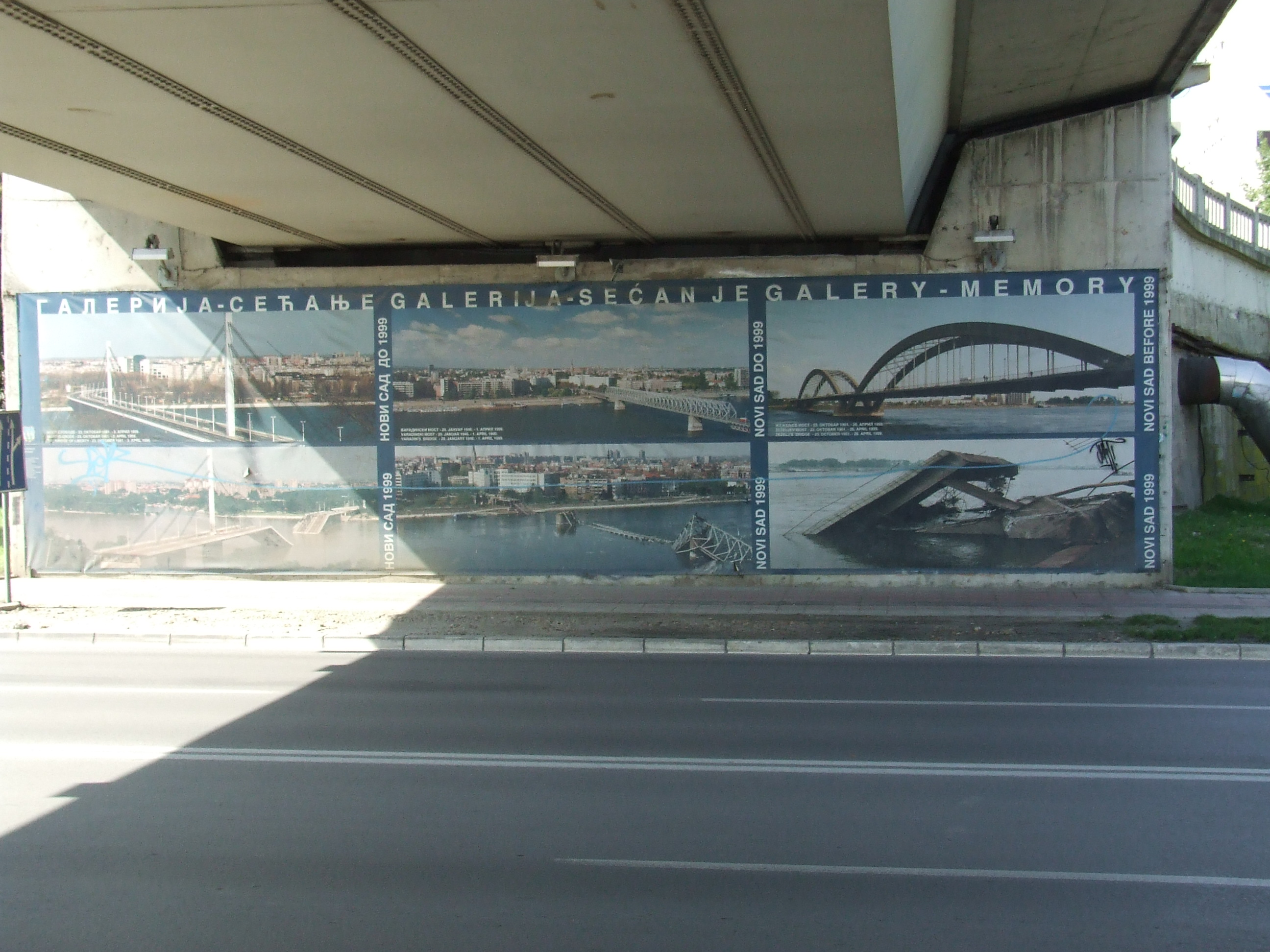
Gallery for the memory of the destroyed bridges of 1999 placed on the pier of the new Varadin Bridge, December 2010

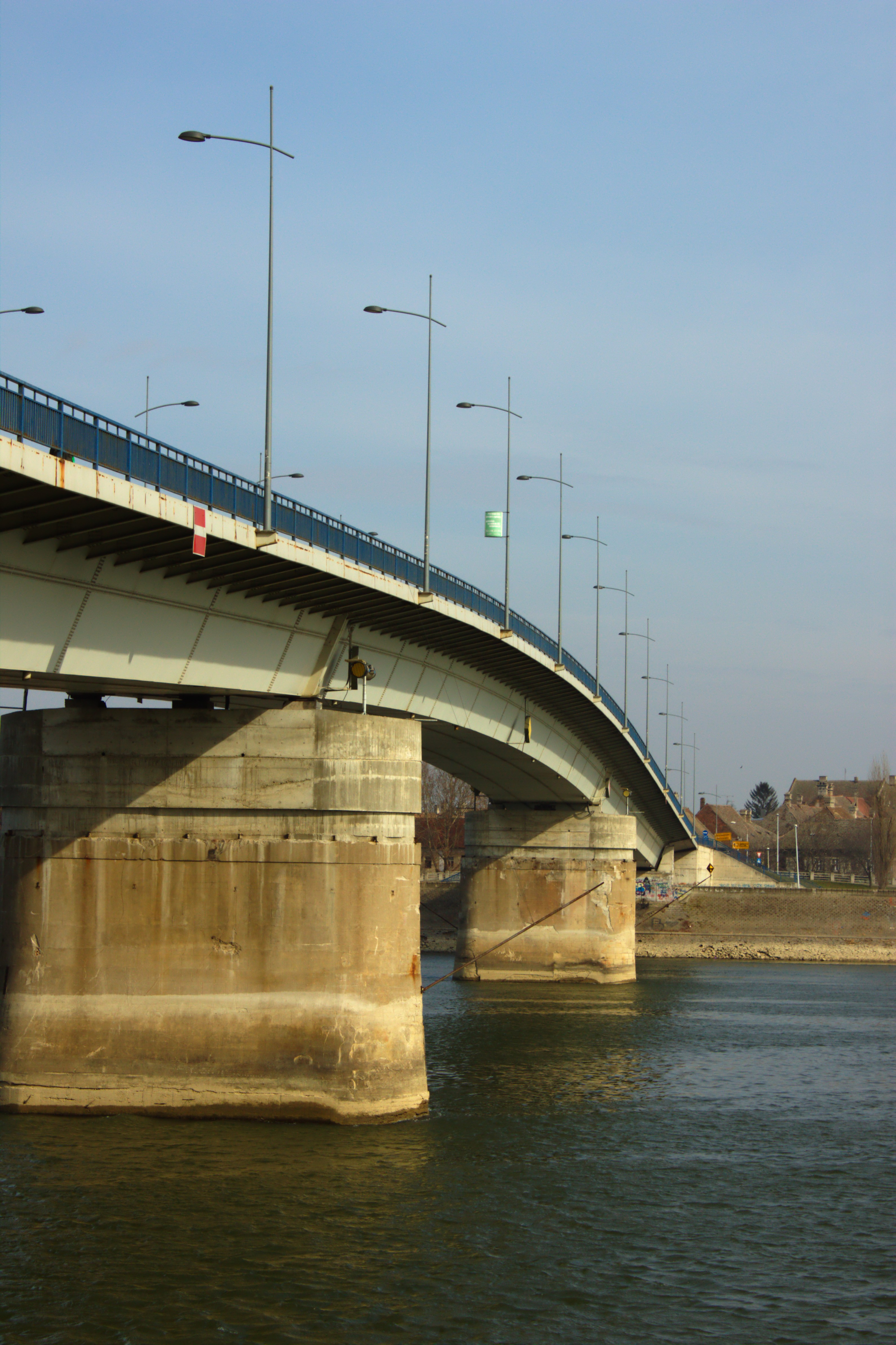
Old and new Varadin Bridge river piers, February 2011

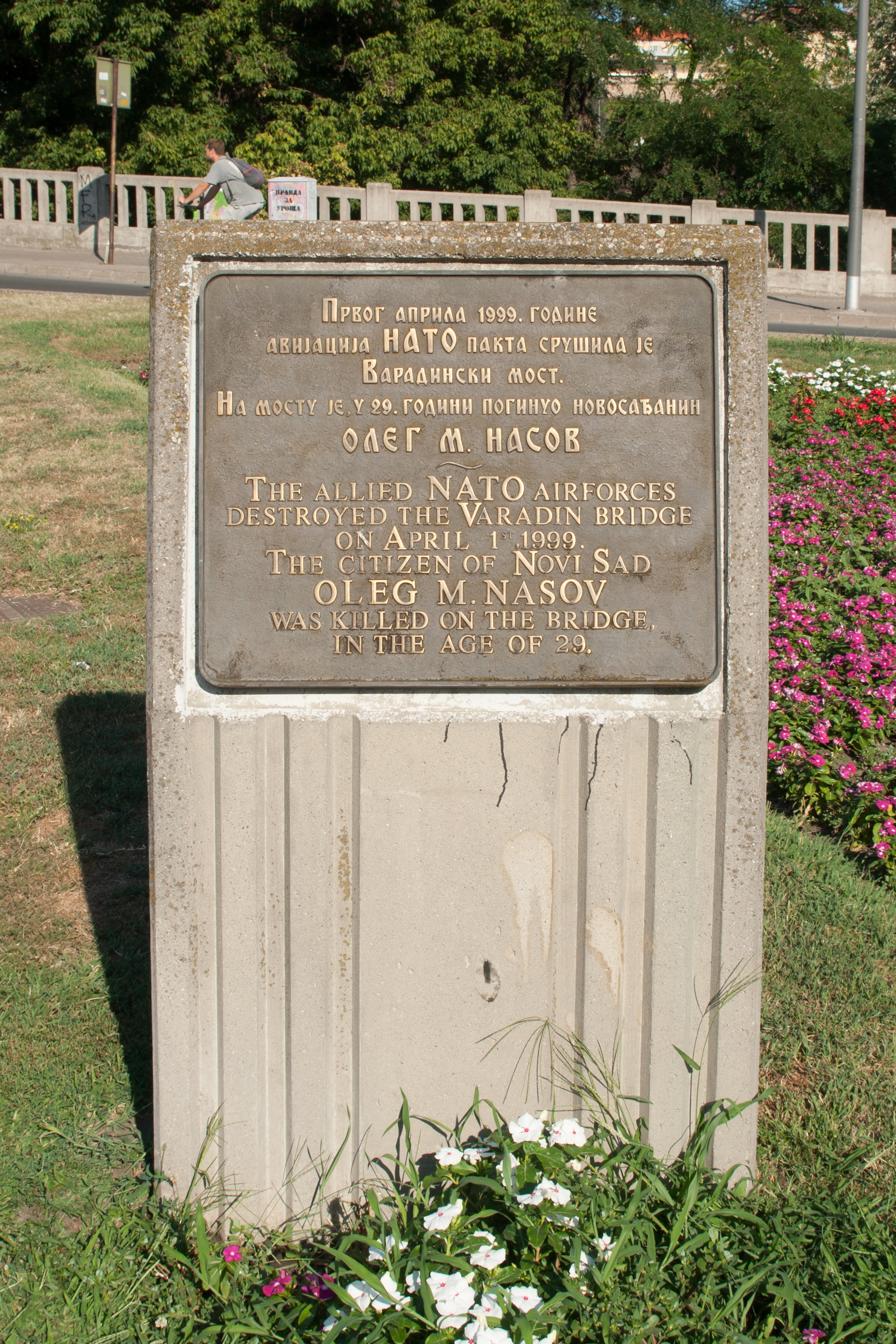
Plaque dedicated to Oleg M. Nasov at the bridge's entrance, August 2013

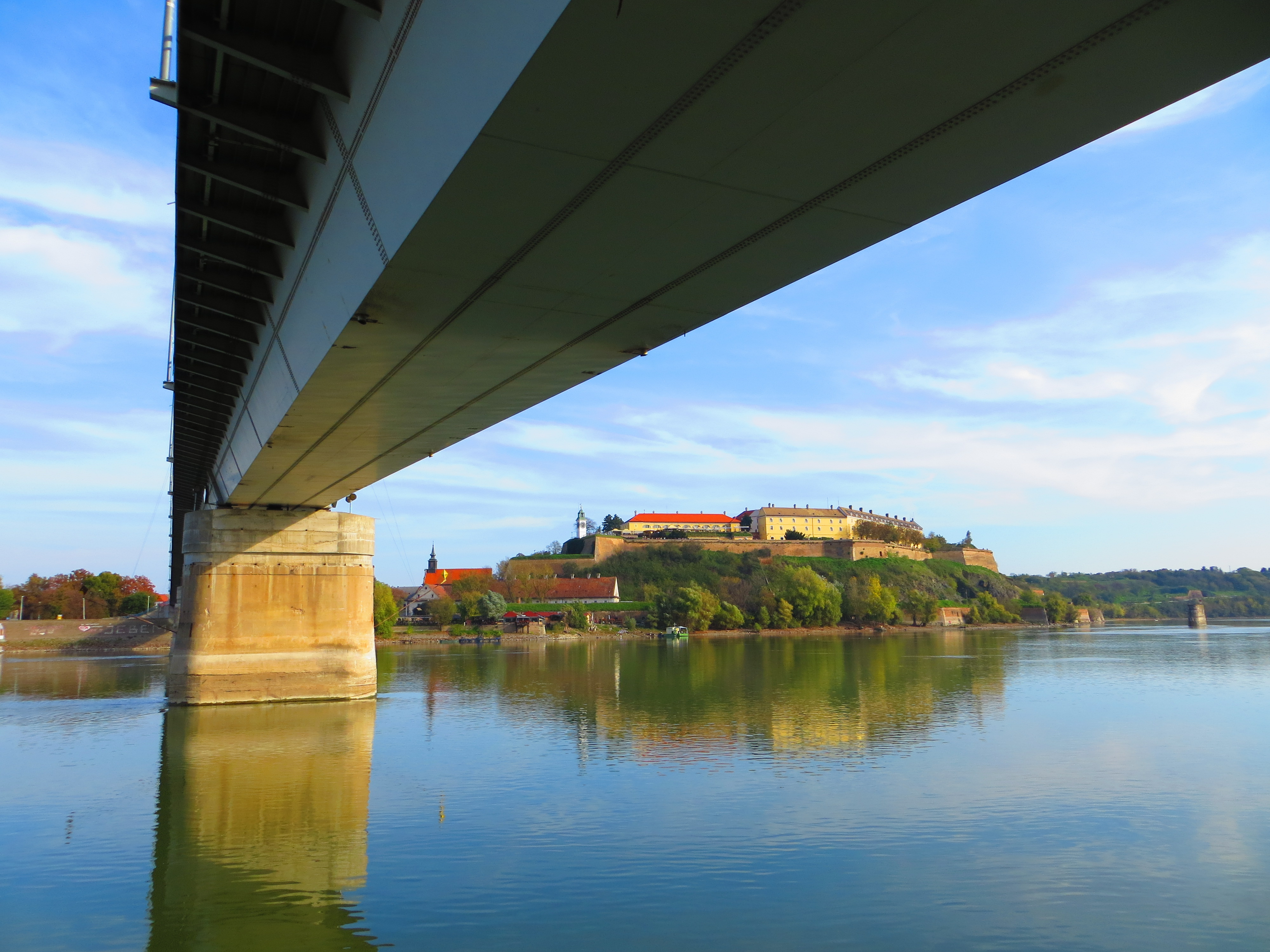
River passing beneath the new bridge, November 2013

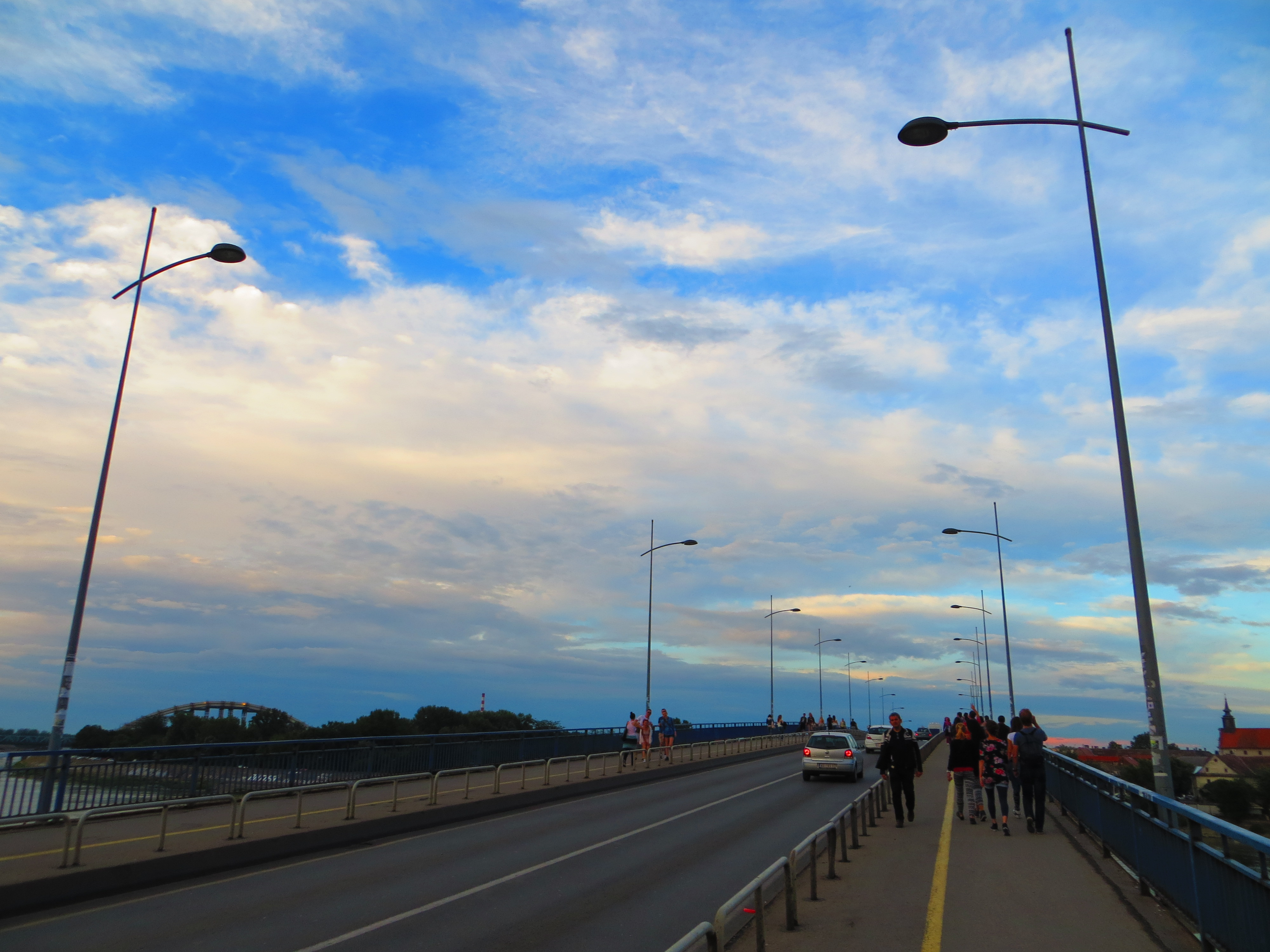
Road and Pedestrian walkway on the new bridge, July 2014

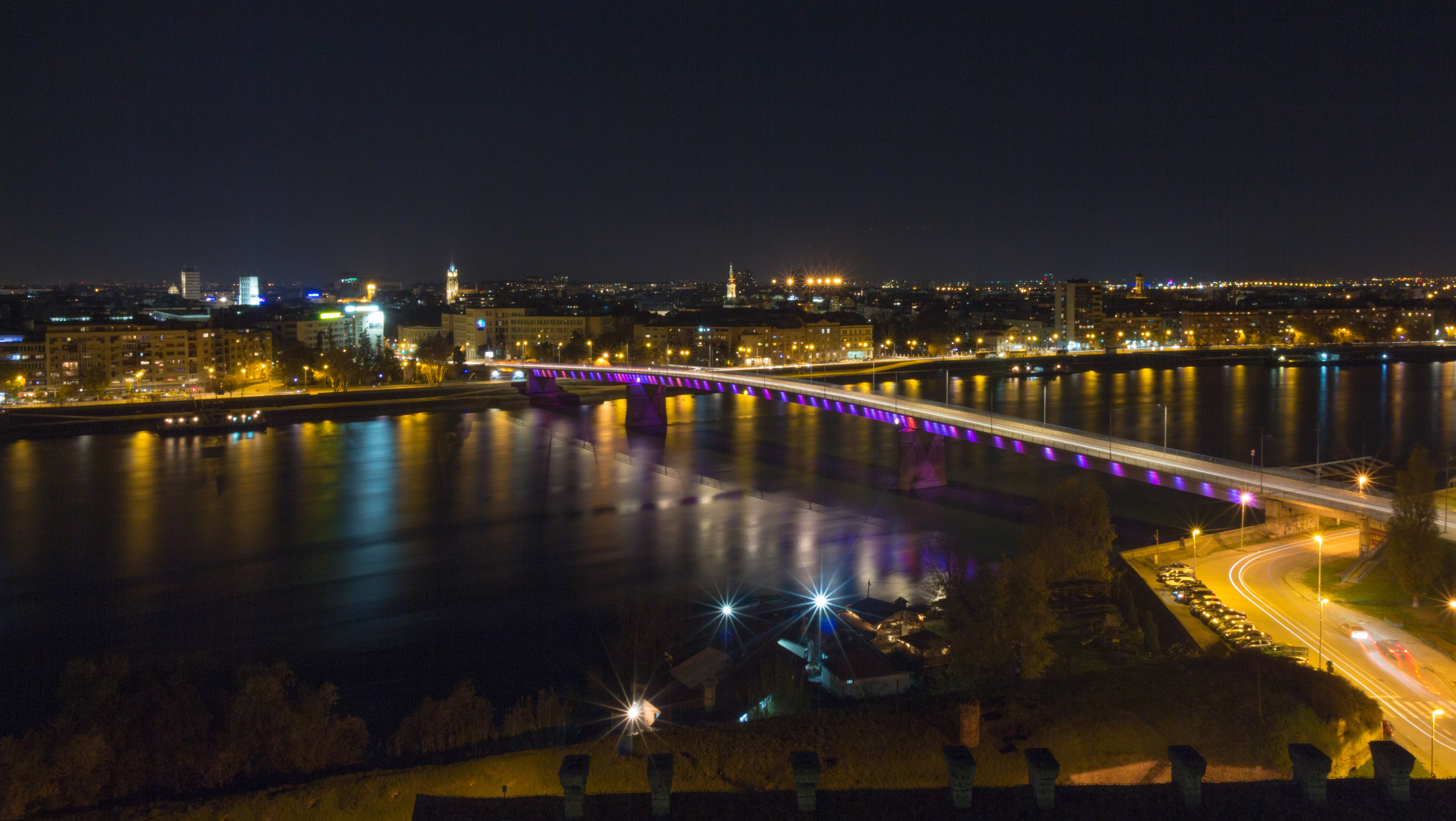
New Varadin Bridge at night, November 2016

== See also ==
- List of bridges in Serbia
- List of crossings of the Danube
