= Hagen Bridge =

Bridge in Novi Sad, Vojvodina, Serbia

Hagen Bridge Хагенов мост Hagenov most
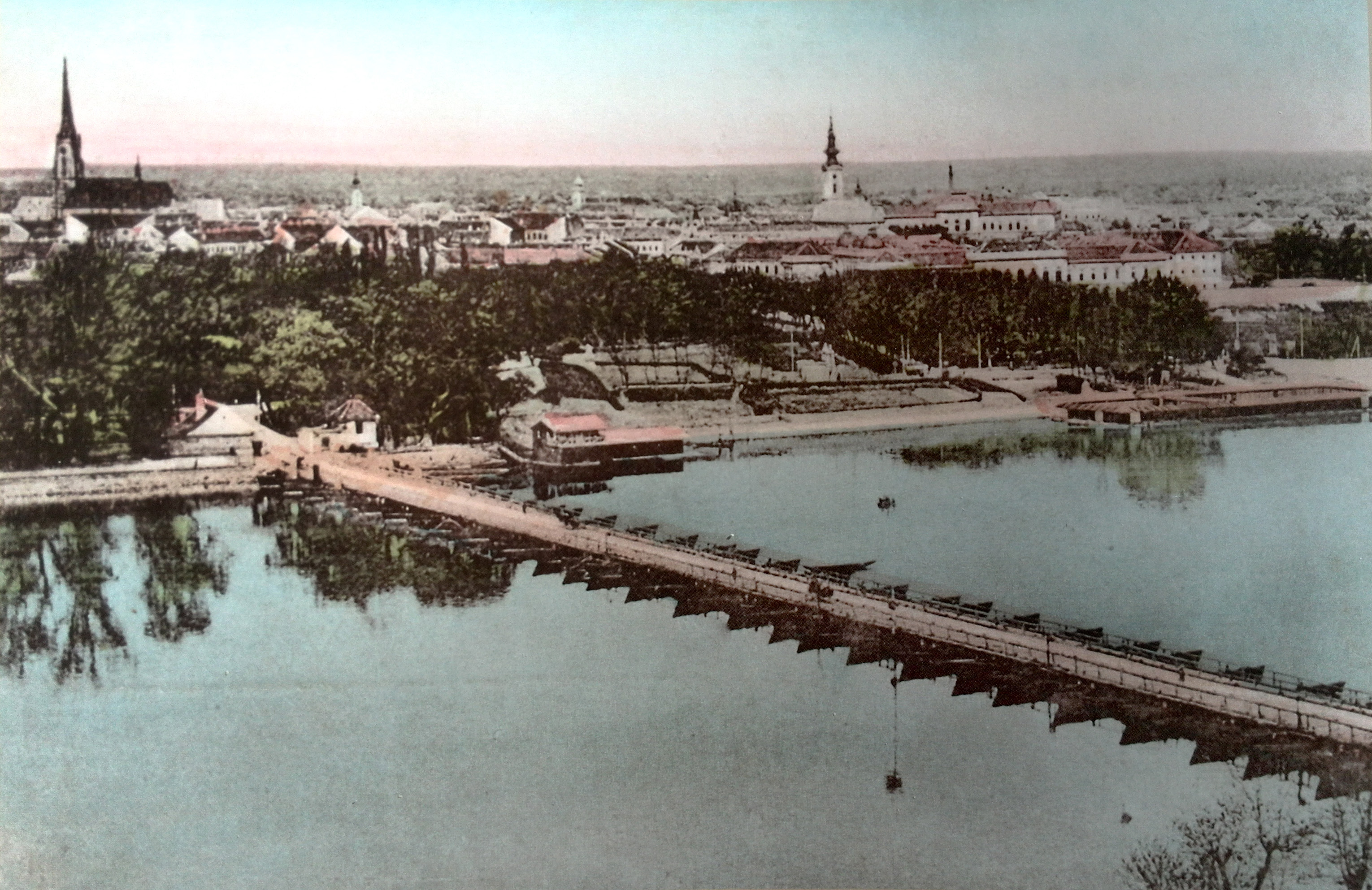
- Hagen Bridge from Petrovaradin Fortress, early 20th century
- Coordinates: 45.254653°N 19.857472°E
- Carried: Carriage and pedestrian walkway
- Crossed: Danube
- Locale: Novi Sad, Vojvodina, Serbia
- Named for: Baron von Hagen
- Preceded by: Emperor Franz Joseph Bridge

Characteristics
- Design: Pontoon bridge
- Material: Oak
- Total length: 320 m (420 steps)
- Traversable?: Yes
- No. of lanes: 2

History
- Designer: Baron von Hagen
- Construction start: 1788; 237 years ago
- Construction end: 1788; 237 years ago
- Opened: 1788; 237 years ago (Ceremoniously opened each year)
- Collapsed: 12 June 1849; 175 years ago (Bombed by Hungarian army)
- Closed: 1918; 107 years ago (Replaced by Prince Tomislav Bridge)

Hagen Bridge (Serbian: Хагенов мост, Hagenov most) was a pontoon bridge on the Danube river in Novi Sad, current day Vojvodina, Serbia. The bridge was opened for traffic in 1788. Until 11 November 1883, with the construction of the Emperor Franz Joseph Bridge, this was the only permanent bridge in Novi Sad that crossed the Danube river, only briefly destroyed during the Hungarian Revolution of 1848. It was removed in 1918 for the construction of the Prince Tomislav Bridge.

== Name ==
The Hagen Bridge was named after the bridge's designer, Baron von Hagen. It was also commonly referred to as the Pontoon Bridge (Serbian: Понтонски мост, Pontonski most).

== Location ==
The bridge was located next to what would later be the Prince Tomislav Bridge, Marshal Tito Bridge and current Varadin Bridge.

== History ==
=== Pontoon bridges prior to 1788 ===
Before the construction of the Hagen Bridge, the Petrovaradin Fortress and the young settlement of Novi Sad had several different pontoon bridges throughout their history, earliest appearing on maps from the late 17th century. Used primarily for military purposes, the bridges would connect the Novi Sad gate of Petrovaradin with the Brukšanac (Bruckschanc) bridgehead, such as the pontoon bridge that lasted from 1697 to 1698. Old maps of Petrovaradin from the early 18th century would showcase two pontoon bridges at the time, placed on locations of the future Prince Andrew Bridge and Prince Tomislav Bridge.

=== Pontoon bridges of 1788—1918 ===
Built in 1788 for the requirements of the 'free royal city' of Novi Sad, the bridge connected the city with Petrovaradin and was the first road bridge in Novi Sad. Designed by officer Baron von Hagen, the 420 steps long bridge was made mostly out of oak pontoons that would open in the middle for passing boats and ships. The design was similar to the pontoon bridge in Mannheim, Germany. At night, the bridge was lit by lanterns. While the bridge did not have separated pedestrian walkways, it was wide enough for two carriages to pass. Everyone besides the citizens of Novi Sad, Petrovaradin, or those that held cargo on their shoulders and hands were required to pay a toll in order to pass the bridge. The Bridge was opened ceremoniously every year, with the Mayor of Novi Sad shaking hands with the commander of the Petrovaradin Fortress. Due to being made out of temporary building materials, it required constant maintenance and protection from river ice. It was maintained by the soldiers stationed at Petrovaradin Fortress, which were sometimes operated by French, Belgian, or English commanders.

The original bridge lasted until 12 June 1849, when the city was bombed from Petrovaradin Fortress by Hungarian forces during the Hungarian Revolution of 1848. It was quickly rebuilt after the devastation and that iteration of the bridge lasted all the way to 1918, when it was finally removed for the construction of a more permanent design of the Prince Tomislav Bridge.

=== Pontoon bridges of the 20th century ===
After the collapse of the Potiorek Bridge on 18 February 1924, a temporary pontoon bridge was placed until the completion of the Prince Tomislav Bridge. It was removed in 1928.

In 1945, after Second World War, a temporary wooden pontoon bridge was placed on the location of the destroyed Prince Tomislav Bridge, until the construction of the Marshal Tito Bridge (later named the Varadin Bridge). It was removed in 1946.

In 1999, after the NATO bombing of Novi Sad that resulted in the destruction of all three of its Danube bridges (Liberty Bridge, Varadin Bridge and Žeželj Bridge), a metal pontoon bridge was temporarily constructed. It was located next to the pillars of the Prince Andrew Bridge and lasted until 2005, when it was removed after the construction of the New Varadin Bridge. Road entrance for this bridge is still visible from the Petrovaradin side.

== Gallery ==
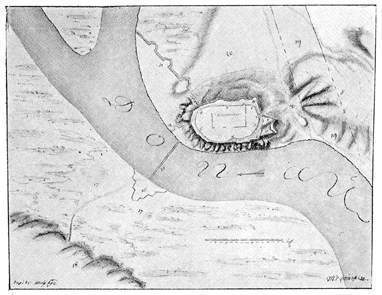
Map of Petrovaradin showcasing a pontoon bridge prior to the Hagen Bridge, 1692

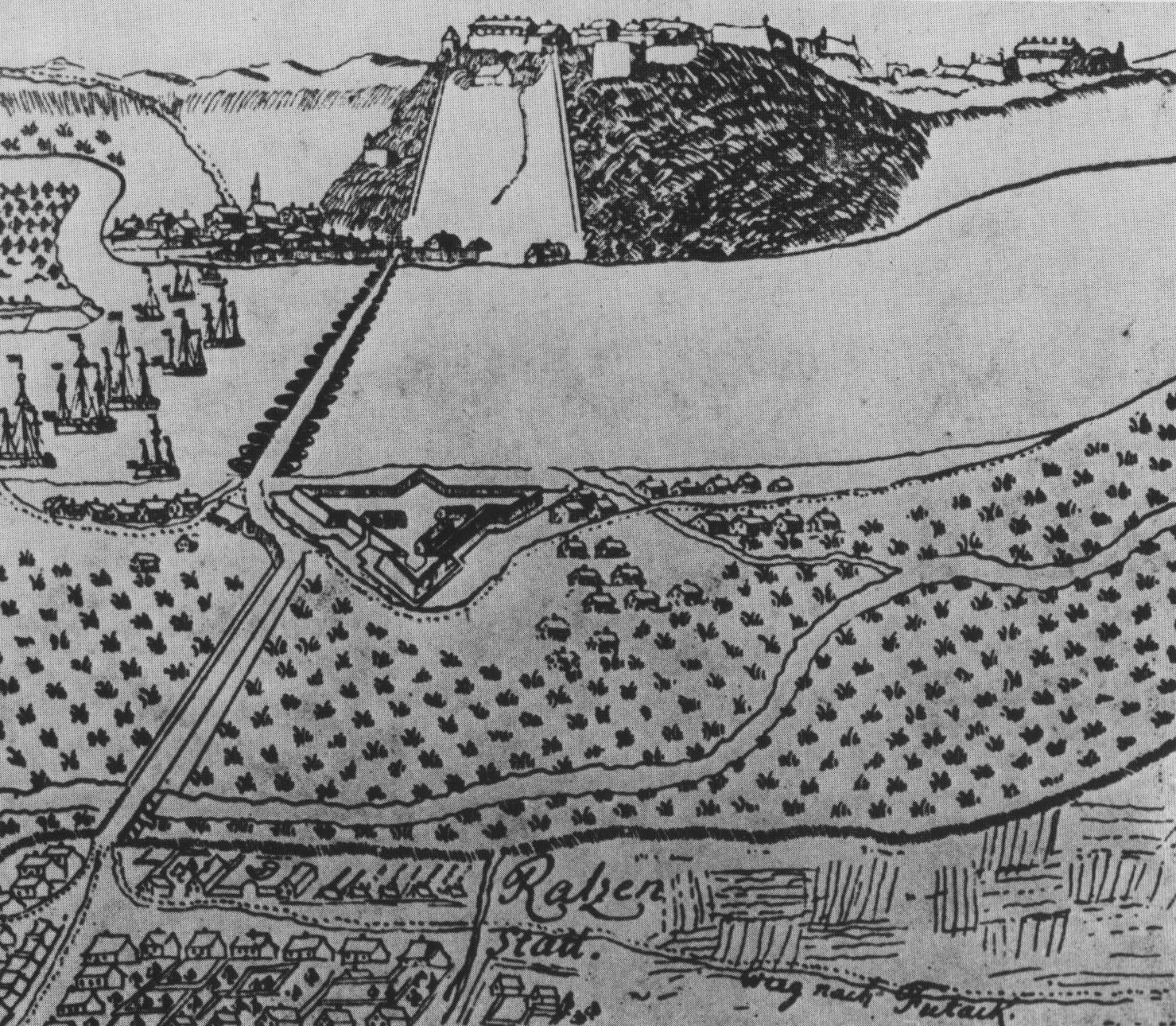
Map of Petrovaradin showcasing a pontoon bridge prior to the Hagen Bridge, 1698

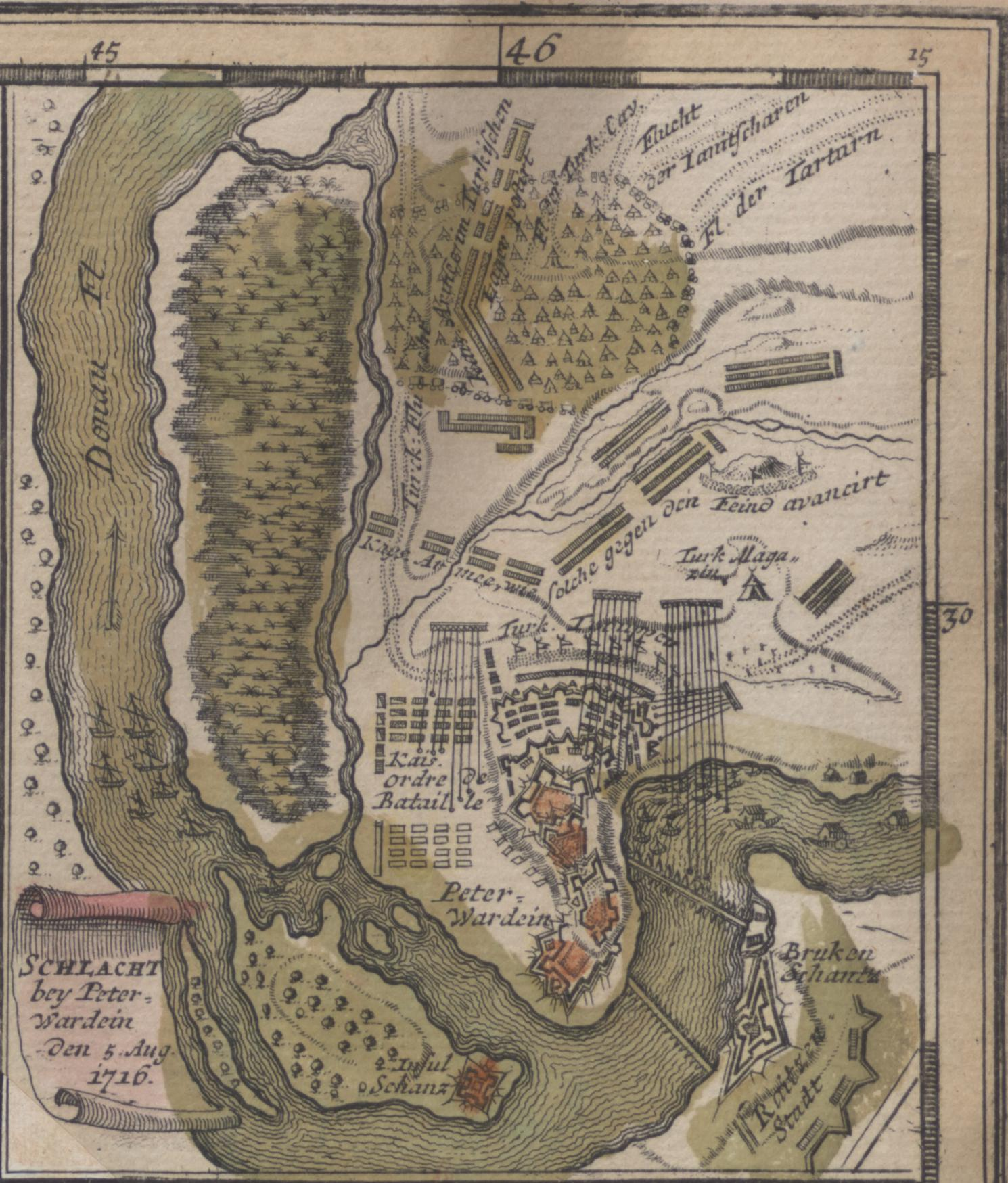
Map of Petrovaradin showcasing pontoon bridges prior to the Hagen Bridge, 5 August 1716

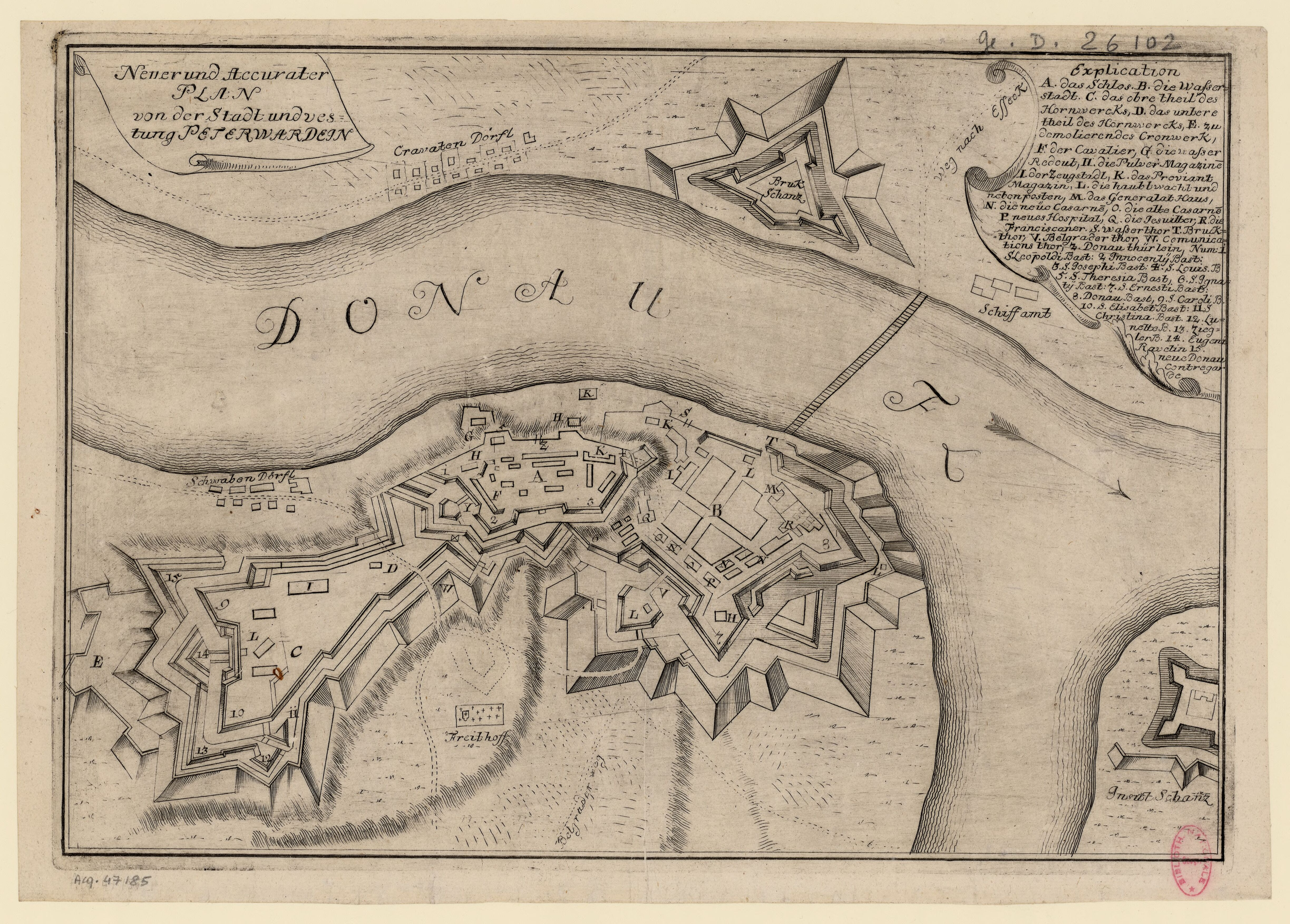
Map of Petrovaradin showing the Hagen Bridge, 18th century

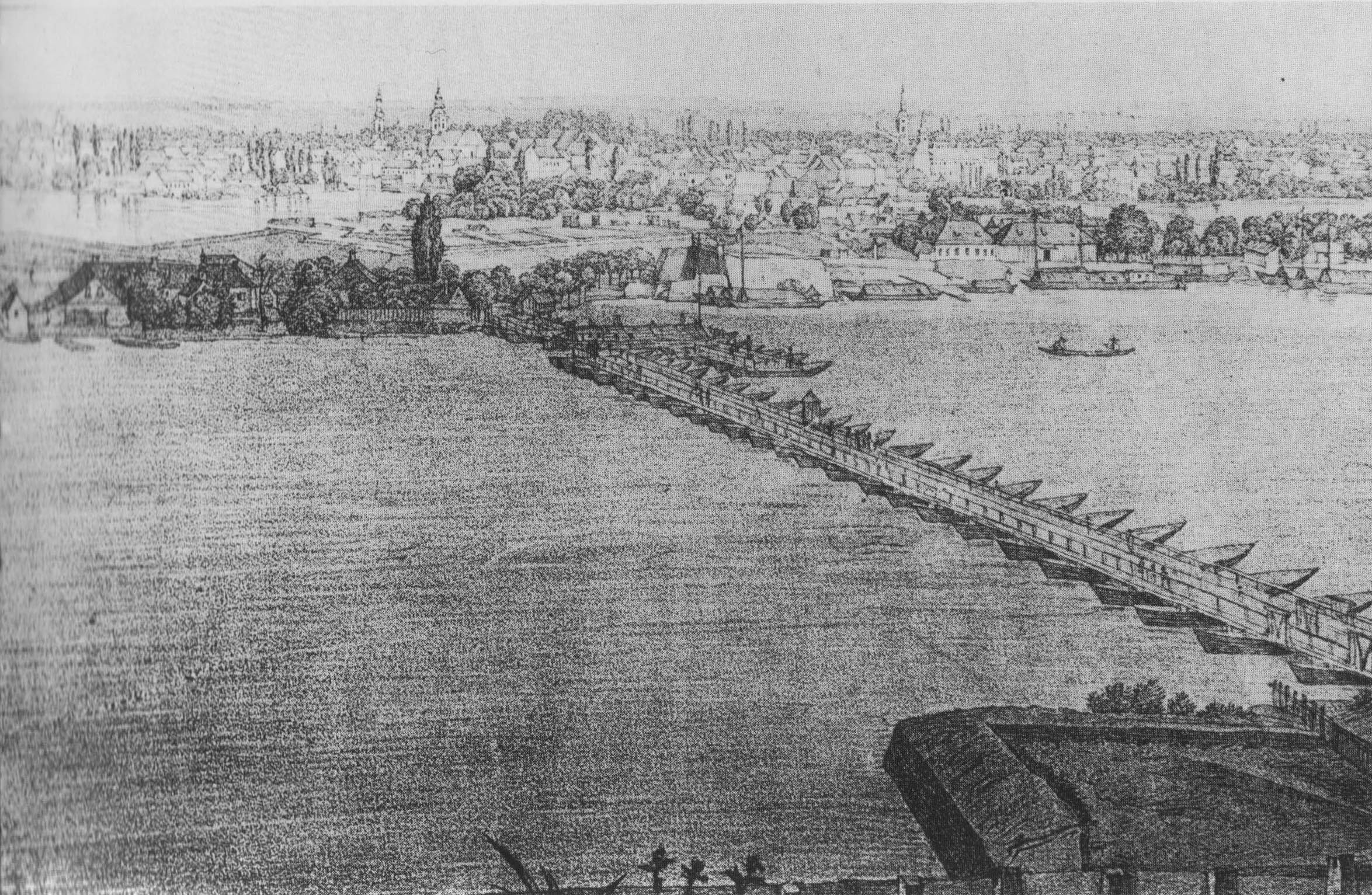
Hagen Bridge in Novi Sad, late 19th century

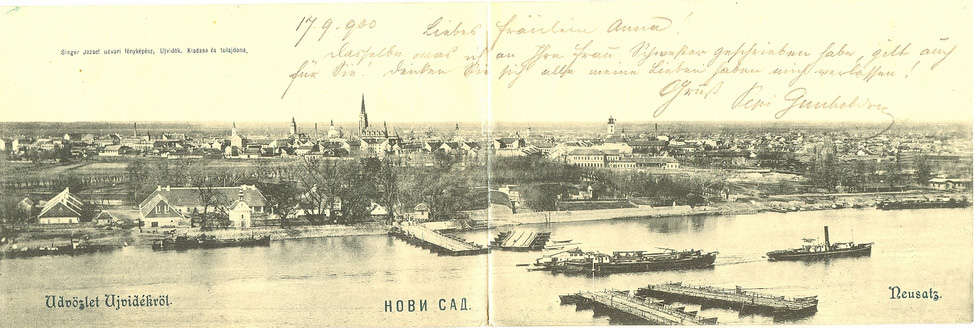
Postcard of the Hagen Bridge, 1900

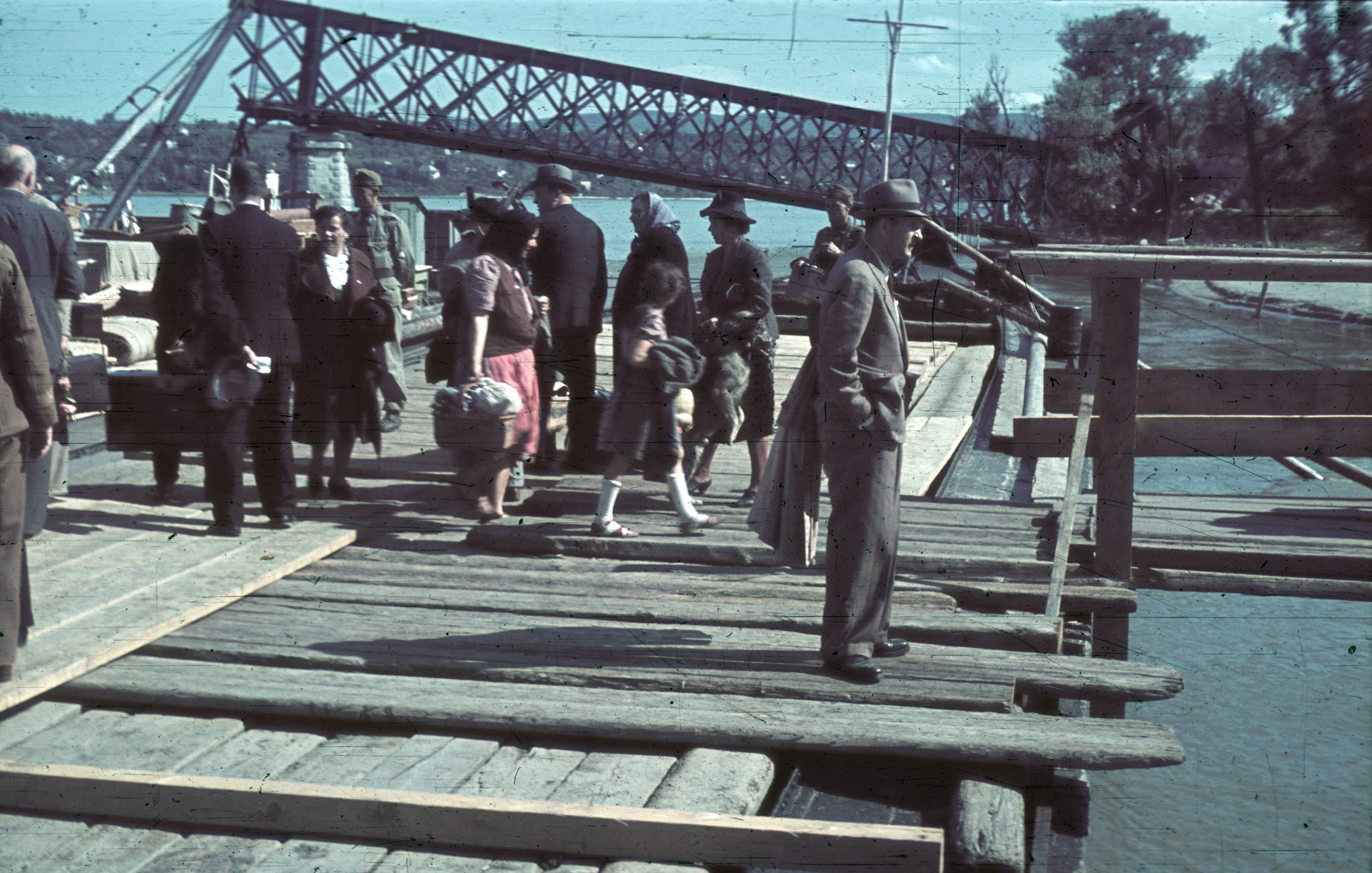
Pontoon Bridge, 1945–1946

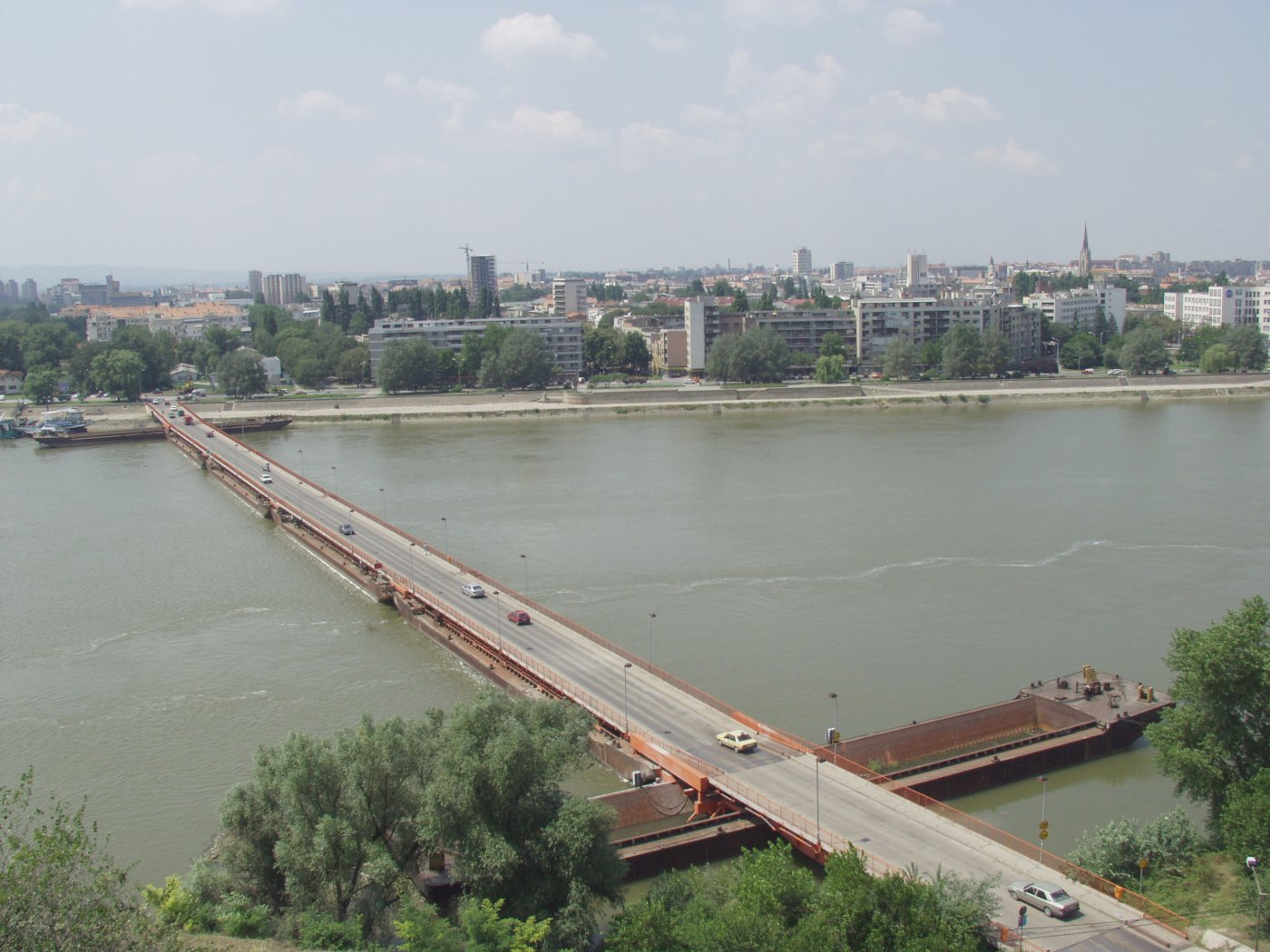
Metal Pontoon Bridge, 1999—2005

== See also ==
- List of bridges in Serbia
- List of crossings of the Danube
