= Prince Andrew Bridge =

Bridge in Novi Sad, Vojvodina, Serbia

Prince Andrew Bridge Мост краљевићу Андреју Most kraljeviću Andreju
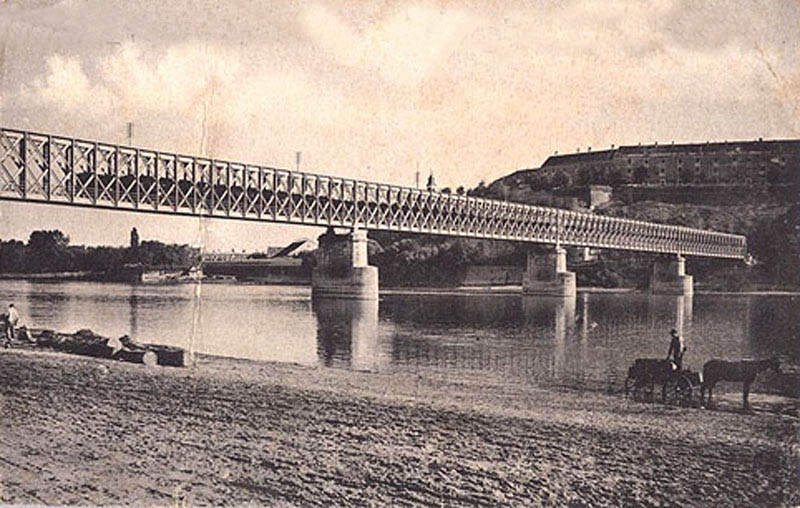
- Prince Andrew Bridge, early 20th century
- Coordinates: 45.250508°N 19.8576531°E
- Crossed: Danube
- Locale: Novi Sad, Vojvodina, Serbia
- Official name: Emperor Franz Joseph Bridge (1883—1918); Prince Andrew Bridge (1918—1941); Railway Bridge (1941—1944)
- Named for: Franz Joseph I of Austria (1883—1918); Prince Andrew of Yugoslavia (1918—1941)
- Followed by: Hagen Bridge (1883–1918); Potiorek Bridge (1915–1924); Prince Tomislav Bridge (1928–1941)

Characteristics
- Design: Truss bridge
- Material: Steel
- Trough construction: Steel
- Pier construction: Reinforced concrete
- Total length: 432 m
- Traversable?: Yes
- Piers in water: 4
- No. of lanes: 1

Rail characteristics
- No. of tracks: 1
- Track gauge: 1,435 mm (4 ft 8 1/2 in)
- Electrified: Yes

History
- Designer: Karl Bauman
- Engineering design by: Fives Group, Nikola Stanković
- Construction start: 9 September 1881; 143 years ago
- Construction end: 11 November 1883; 141 years ago
- Construction cost: 1,370,000 forints
- Opened: 11 November 1883; 141 years ago (Initial opening); 1941 (Reopening)
- Collapsed: 11 April 1941; 84 years ago (destroyed by Yugoslav forces); 22 October 1944; 80 years ago (destroyed by German forces)

Prince Andrew Bridge (Serbian: Мост краљевића Андреја, Most kraljevića Andreja) was a railway bridge on the Danube river in Novi Sad, current day Vojvodina, Serbia. The bridge was opened for traffic on 11 November 1883. It currently holds the title of the longest standing permanent bridge in Novi Sad, lasting for 61 years until its destruction on 11 April 1941 by Yugoslav army during the Invasion of Yugoslavia. It was rebuilt in 1941 and destroyed again on 22 October 1944 by the German forces during their retreat. The bridge's piers remain to this day.

== Name ==
The bridge was originally named as Emperor Franz Joseph Bridge (Serbian: Мост цара Франца Јозефа, Most cara Franca Jozefa, Croatian: Most cara Franje Josipa, Hungarian: Ferenc József híd) after Franz Joseph I of Austria between 1883 and 1918. After the First World War, the bridge was renamed into Prince Andrew Bridge, named after Prince Andrew of Yugoslavia, youngest son of King Alexander I Karađorđevič. Between 1941 and 1944 during the Axis occupation of Serbia it was just called the Railway Bridge (Serbian: Жележнички мост, Železnički most, Croatian: Željeznička pruga, Hungarian: Vashíd).

== Location ==
Prince Andrew Bridge was at the time the most upstream Novi Sad bridge over the Danube river. It connected the Bačka and Syrmia sides of the City of Novi Sad, specifically Novi Sad and Petrovaradin. The entrance from Novi Sad was located at the end of modern Cara Lazara Boulevard, with Petrovaradin entrance going through a tunnel and ending near the modern Preradovićeva street.

== History ==
=== Railway Bridge from 1883 to 1944 ===
The construction of the bridge started on 9 September 1881. Designed by Austrian architect Karl Bauman (who also designed the bridge's 341-meter long tunnel), the railway bridge was in the form of an elongated beam 432 meters long, with a one railway track and was upstream from the pontoon bridge. It had six piers, four river piers and two coastal piers, built according to plans by the French Fives Group in Paris. Of the five openings between the piers, four had equal distances of 84 meters, while the fifth, located between the third and fourth piers, had a width of 96 meters. The bridge had a steel-barred structure, as well as upright and mutually reinforced supports, while on the tops it was connected by a transverse metal structure. The first control load on the bridge was done with three locomotives. The bridge was finished and opened for traffic on 11 November 1883. At the time, the Novi Sad bridge was listed as one of the largest railway bridges in Europe, and the construction cost 1,370,000 forints.

As the first railway bridge in Novi Sad, the old Novi Sad railway station was connected to the Subotica—Zemun railway line. The bridge's railway was constructed from the plans of Nikola Stanković, an engineer from Stapar. There were lanterns at the bridge's ends, and since 1911, it had electric lighting. It was resistant to earthquakes like the ones that took place in Ledinci in 1739 and Sremski Karlovci in 1789.

Until the First World War, the famous Orient Express passed through this bridge. At the end of the First World War, the Serbian army saved it from destruction at the hands of the Austro-Hungarian forces.

In the Second World War, by the orders of the Military-Technical Services of the Novi Sad Military Region and Captain Svetozar Popov, the bridge was destroyed at 23:48 on 11 April 1941 by Yugoslav army to slow down the German advances to the south. It was rebuilt by the Germans in 1941. Access to the bridge was strictly forbidden, and since September 1943 it has been guarded by Italian prisoners of war from Tirana. During the Allied bombing of Novi Sad, the allies attempted to bomb and destroy the bridge without success. Two German planes were entangled in its wire networks and then set on fire. The bridge was ultimately destroyed for the second and final time at 15:00 on 22 October 1944 by the German forces.

During the retreat, the German forces also planned destroy bridge tunnel with 30 wagons of munition explosives that would have resulted in the destruction of the fortress and large parts of the city. The tunnel and the fortress were saved by Guido Pesapane, an Italian prisoners of war who escaped his imprisonment and warned the locals of the planned destruction. He and several locals cut the wires for the explosives meant for the tunnel, but were unable to cut the ones meant for the bridge explosives due to it being heavily guarded. Years later the tunnel would be named after him.

Most of the bridge piers exist to this day, with one removed by explosives in August 1961 for easier river navigation. One of the pillars was decorated as the Yellow Submarine for the 2022 Exit Music Festival.

=== Future Pedestrian and Bike Bridge ===
Although the idea of building a bridge at the foot of the Petrovaradina Fortress existed for decades, the plan for its implementation came about in 2010, with 2019 being the true beginning of its realization. The winning design is a pedestrian and bike bridge with a design reminiscent of the old bridge and the High Line in New York City, United States. The bridge was designed by Fedor Jurić, Ognjen Graovac, Ivan Šuić, Martina Milošević, Milka Gnjato and Ivan Zuliani. Built by Shandong company costing 40 million euros, the bridge will use a steel frame construction on top of the existing concrete piers, with glass for the railing, wood for the pedestrian path, and tartan for the bike path. The bridge is planned to be 450 meters long and 12 meters wide (6-meter for pedestrian path, 1.5 meters for decorations, 3 meters for bike path). From Novi Sad it would be access from the pedestrian and bike paths from Cara Lazara Boulevard and Sunny Quay, while the Petrovaradin side could be accessed via the 355-meter long Guido Pesapane tunnel (and an elevator going up to the Fortress) and future pedestrian and bike paths on the Kamenički road. The construction is planned to start in the later half of 2024.

== Gallery ==
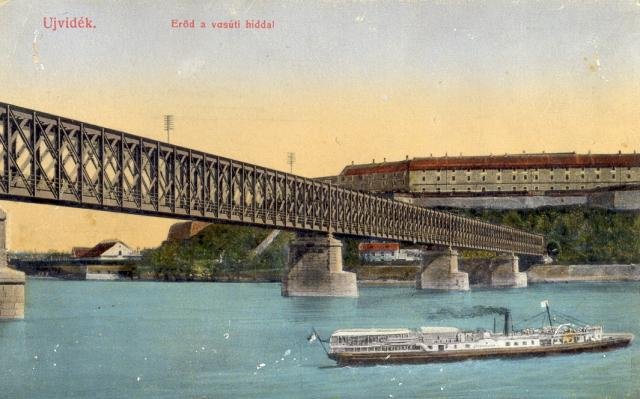
Postcard of the Prince Andrew Bridge, early 20th century

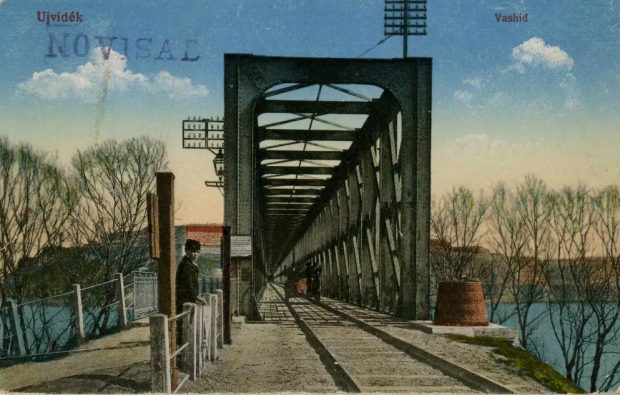
Postcard of the Prince Andrew Bridge entrance, early 20th century

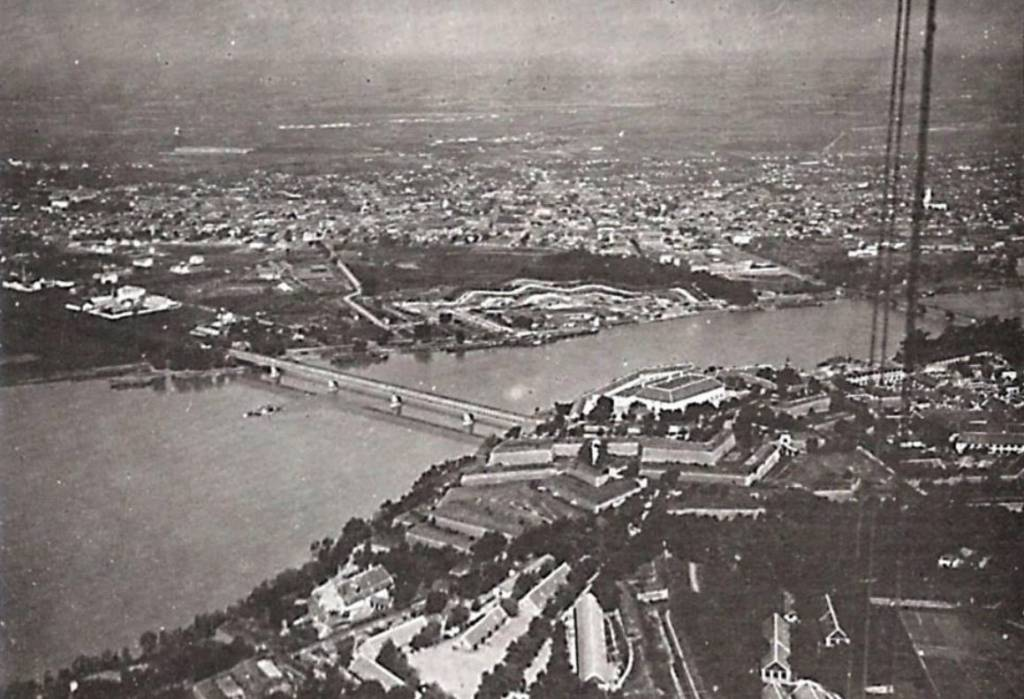
Prince Andrew Bridge, 1920s

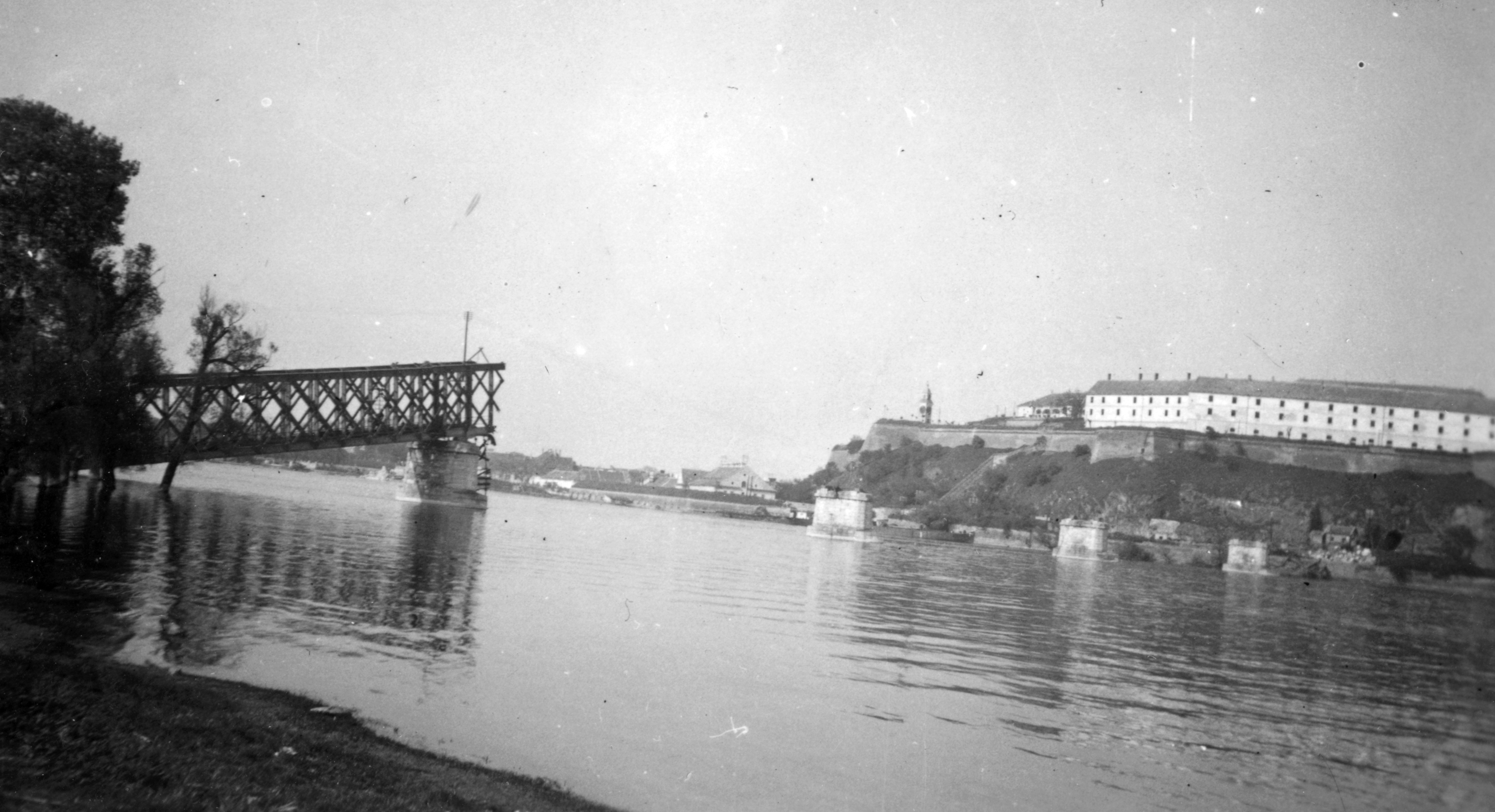
Destroyed Bridge, 1941

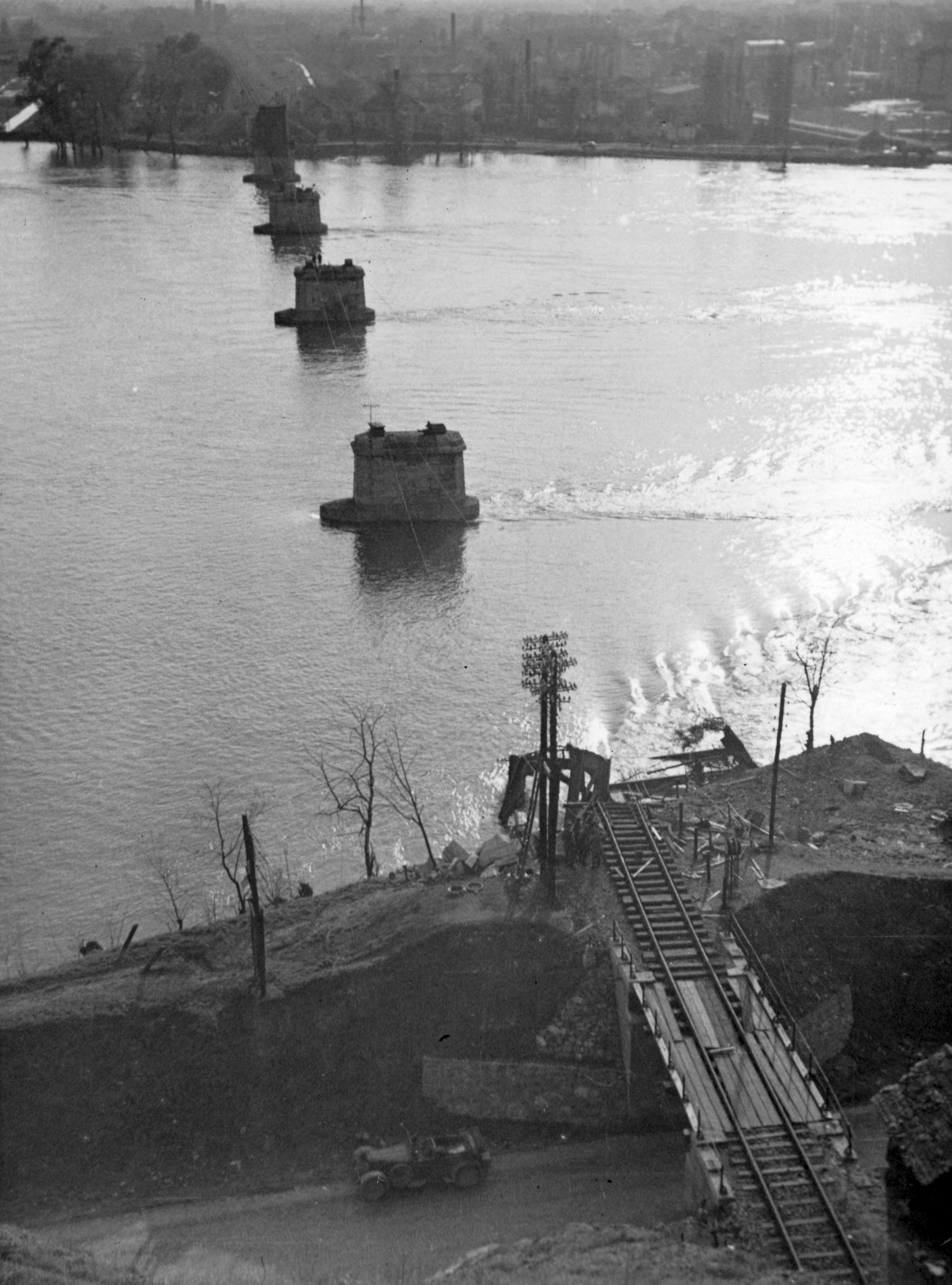
Destroyed Bridge, 1941

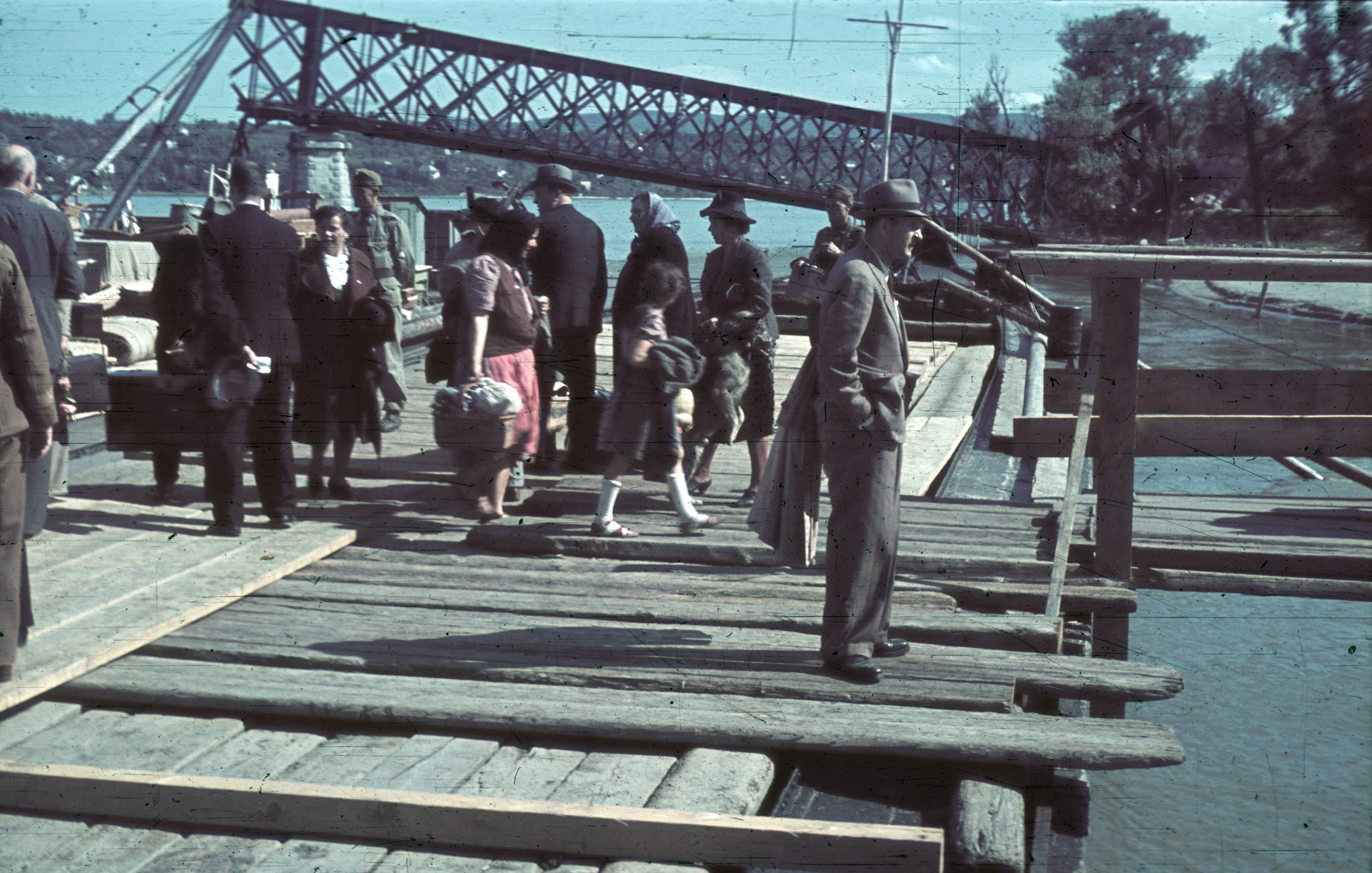
Destroyed Bridge, 1941

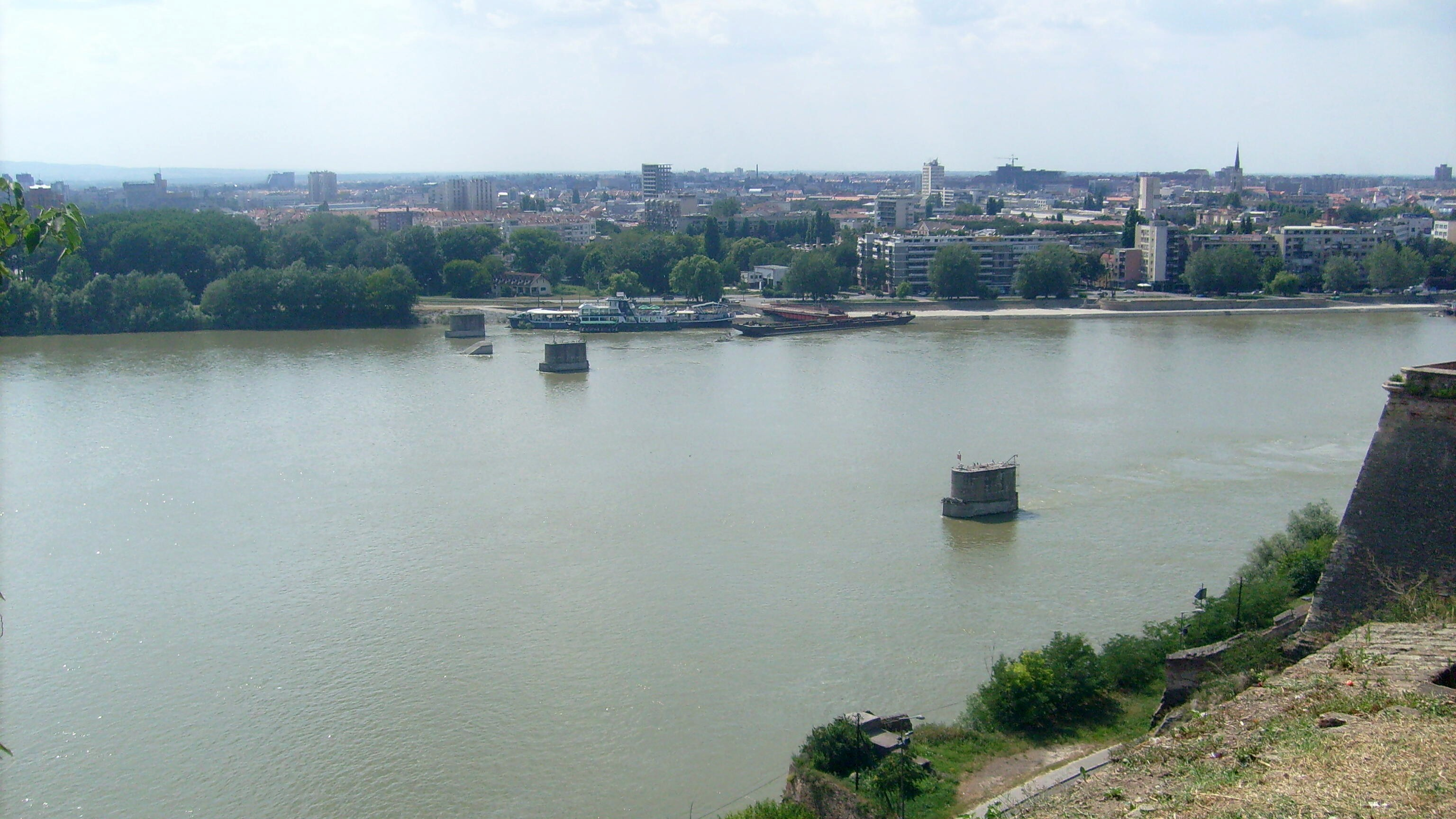
Remaining piers of the bridge, July 2009

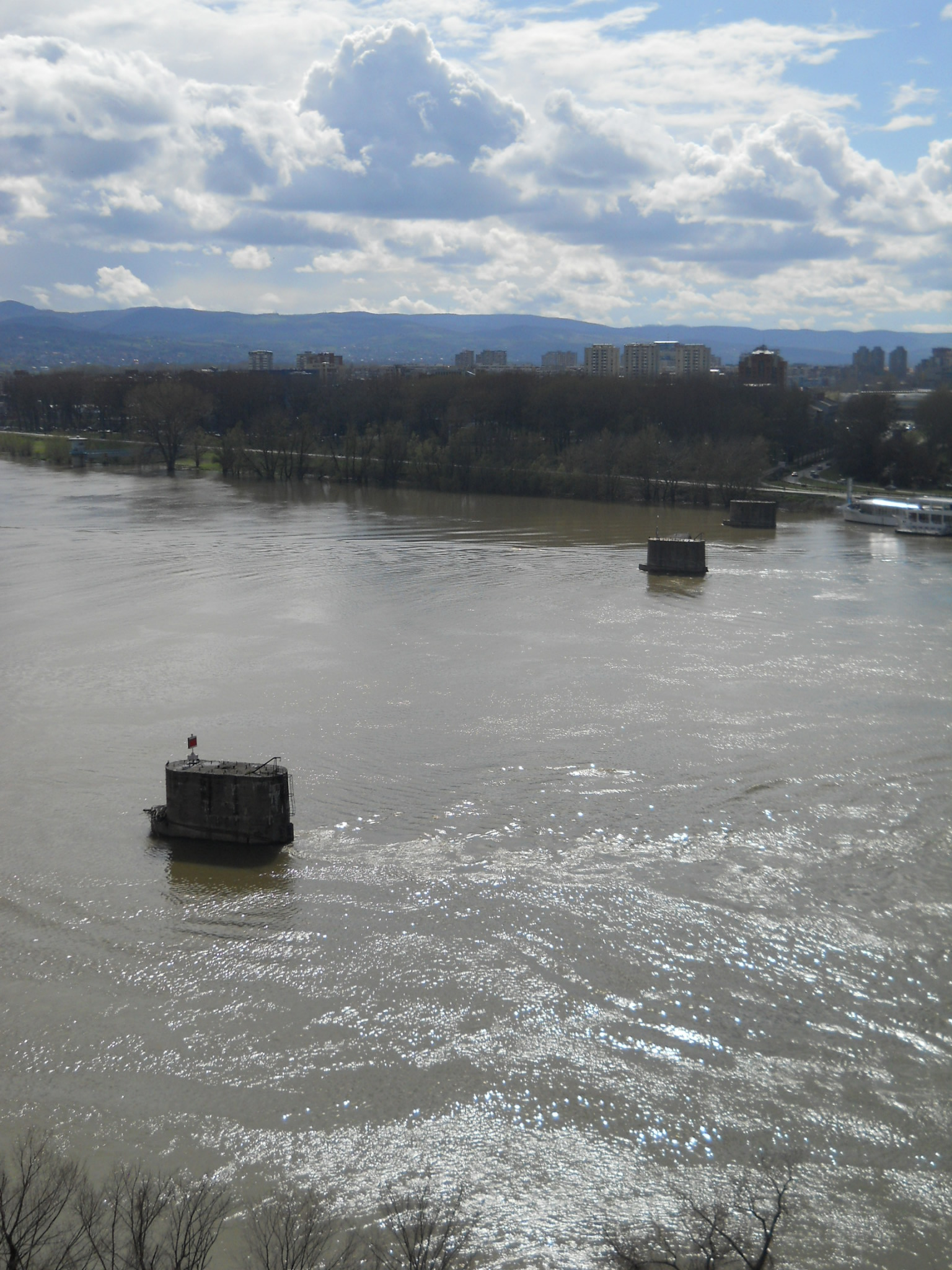
Remaining piers of the bridge, April 2013

== See also ==
- List of bridges in Serbia
- List of crossings of the Danube
