= Prince Tomislav Bridge =

Bridge in Novi Sad, Vojvodina, Serbia

Prince Tomislav Bridge Мост краљевићу Томиславу Most kraljeviću Tomislavu
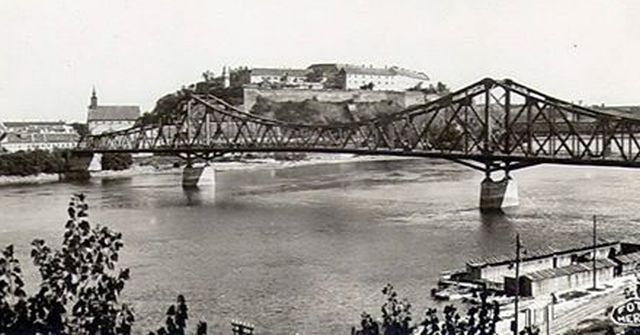
- Prince Tomislav Bridge, 1930s
- Coordinates: 45.254653°N 19.857472°E
- Crossed: Danube
- Locale: Novi Sad, Vojvodina, Serbia
- Official name: Prince Tomislav Bridge
- Named for: Prince Tomislav of Yugoslavia
- Preceded by: Prince Andrew Bridge

Characteristics
- Design: Cantilever truss bridge
- Material: Steel
- Trough construction: Steel
- Pier construction: Reinforced concrete
- Total length: 341 m
- Width: 9.6 m
- Traversable?: Yes
- No. of spans: 2
- Piers in water: 2
- No. of lanes: 2

History
- Designer: Dr Szilárd Zielinski
- Engineering design by: Aug. Klönne; J. Gollnow & Sohn
- Construction start: 1921; 105 years ago
- Construction end: 20 May 1928; 98 years ago
- Opened: 20 May 1928; 98 years ago
- Collapsed: 11 April 1941; 85 years ago (destroyed by Yugoslav forces)

Location
- Interactive map of Prince Tomislav Bridge

Prince Tomislav Bridge (Serbian: Мост краљевића Томислава, Most kraljevića Tomislava) was a road bridge on the Danube river in Novi Sad, current day Vojvodina, Serbia. The bridge was opened for traffic on 20 May 1928. The design was inspired by the Liberty Bridge in Budapest, Hungary. It was destroyed on 11 April 1941 by the Yugoslav army during the Invasion of Yugoslavia. The bridge was replaced by the Marshal Tito Bridge in 1945 and later Varadin Bridge in 2000.

== Name ==
The Prince Tomislav Bridge was named after Prince Tomislav of Yugoslavia, the middle son of King Alexander I Karađorđevič, who was born the same year when the bridge was opened to the public.

== Location ==
Prince Tomislav Bridge was located next to the old Hagen Bridge, on the current location of the Varadin Bridge at the end of Mihalja Pupina Boulevard (known as Kraljice Marije Boulevard during the time of the bridges completion).

== History ==
Since September 1919, a year after the end of the First World War, plans for the construction of a permanent road bridge were already set.

For this capital venture, a 1910 bridge design project was chosen. Designed by Hungarian engineer Dr Szilárd Zielinski, rector of the Technical Faculty in Budapest, the bridge was inspired by the Liberty Bridge in Budapest, Hungary.

Before the start of construction, a contract was made between the military and civilian authorities, by which the Army of the Kingdom of Serbs, Croats and Slovenes ceded the former Brukšanac (Bruckschanc) bridgehead to the city. In return the city handed over King Peter's barracks in Vojvode Bojovića street and several other barracks, buildings, and land to the army.

For the purpose of building the new bridge, during 1923 the Brukšanac bridgehead, a small fortress built on the Novi Sad side, as well as the Novi Sad gate, which was located on the Petrovaradin side, were demolished and leveled.

Construction of the bridge started in 1921. It was financed from German War reparations. The iron came from Germany in wagons weighing 30 tonnes during 1923. The framework was constructed by the Aug. Klönne firm from Dortmund and J. Gollnow & Sohn firm from Szczecin. The 341 meter long bridge (304 meters length above the river) had an iron construction weighing 3500 tonnes. The pedestrian walkways were 1.3 meters wide, while the vehicle road was 7 meters wide.

The bridge was opened on 20 May 1928 with a large ceremony. Cannons were used to commemorate the opening of the bridge, while the Mayor of Novi Sad shook hands with the trustee of Petrovaradin in the middle of the bridge. Queen Maria of Yugoslavia awarded a chalice for liturgical communion to the Franciscan monastery of Saint George in Petrovaradin, as the closest Christian religious building to the bridge. However, the bridge was opened incomplete, with finishing touches occurring in later years. Electrical lighting was installed on 28 November 1930.

In the Second World War, by the orders of the Military-Technical Services of the Novi Sad Military Region and Captain Svetozar Popov, the bridge was destroyed on 11 April 1941 by Yugoslav army to slow down the German advances to the south.

After the war the bridge was replaced by the Marshal Tito Bridge opened in January 1946, which lasted for 53 years until the NATO bombing of Novi Sad in 1999. That bridge was replaced by the Varadin Bridge in 2000. The only remnants of the bridge are the river piers and the elevated roads entering the New Varadin Bridge.

== Gallery ==
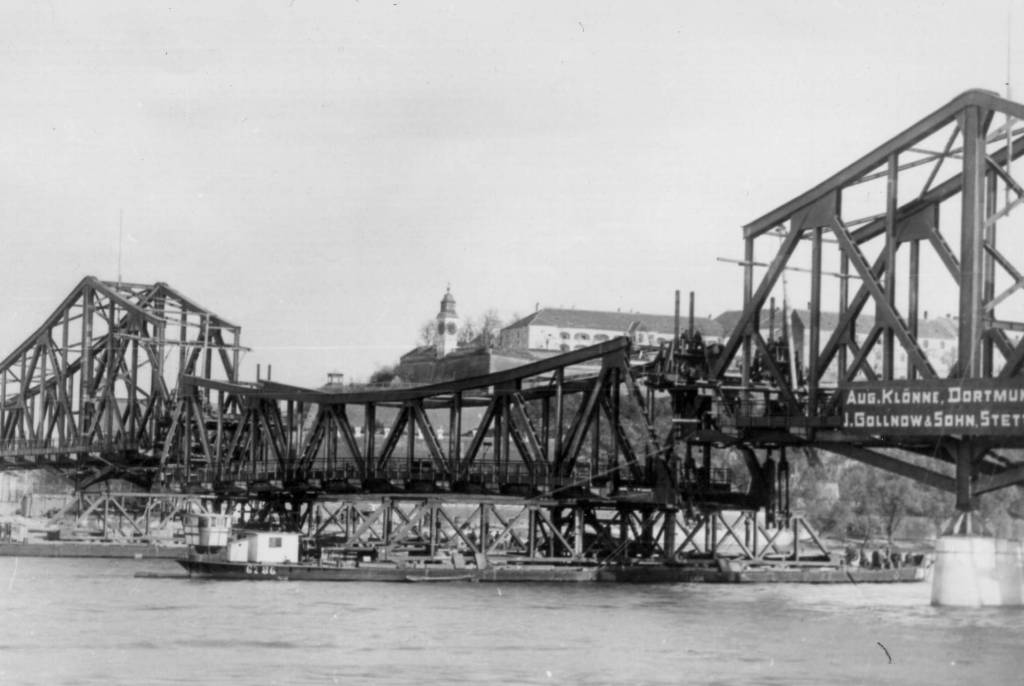
Construction of the Prince Tomislav Bridge, 1921—1928

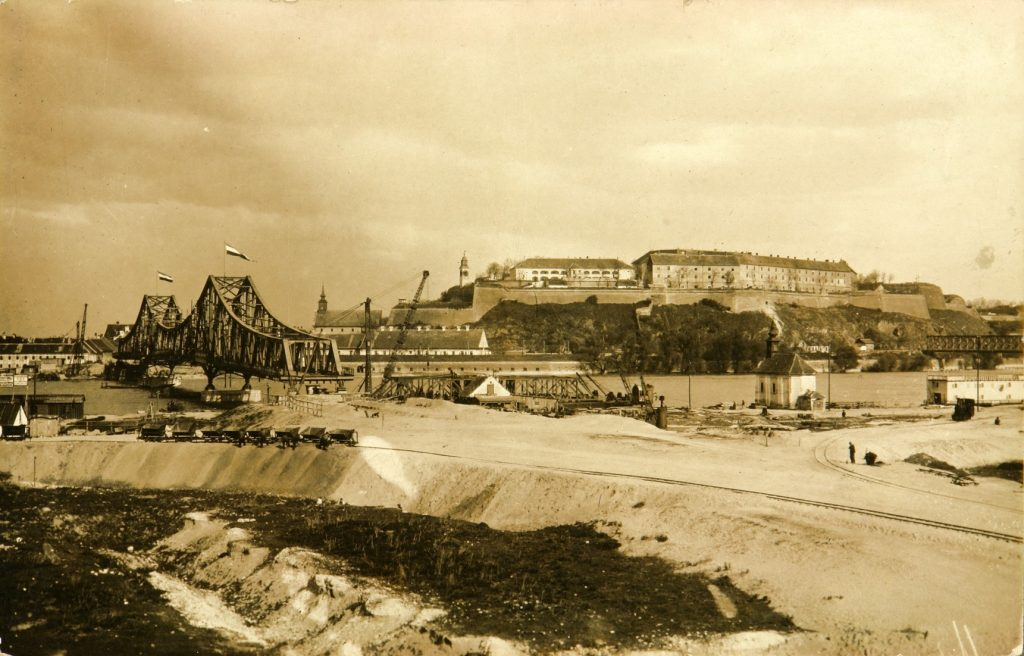
Construction of the Prince Tomislav Bridge, 1921—1928

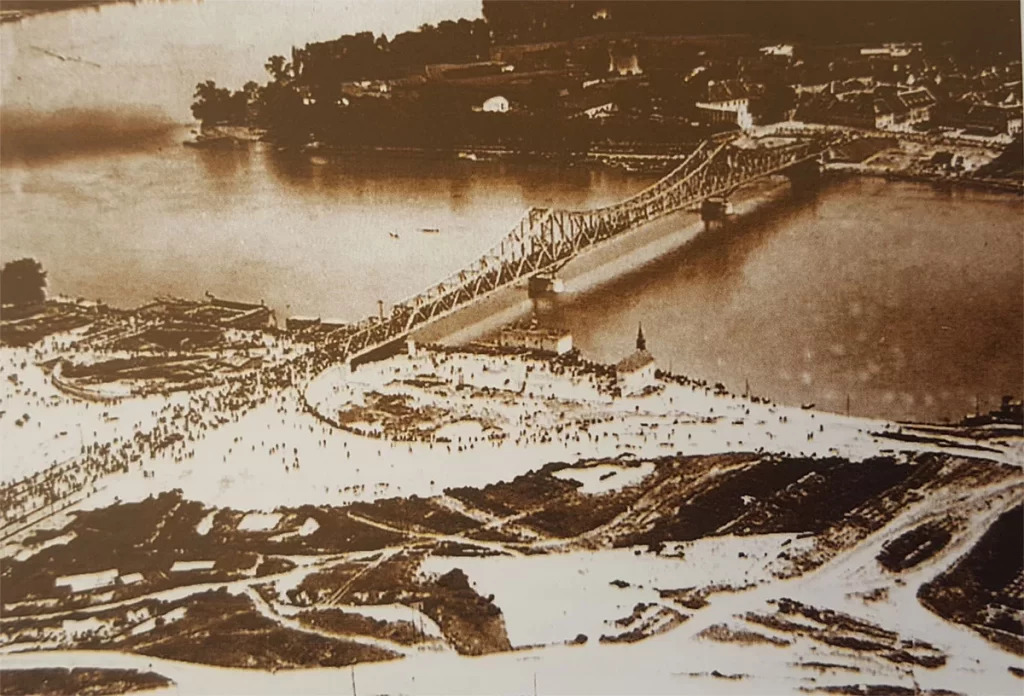
Opening ceremony of the Prince Tomislav Bridge, 20 May 1928

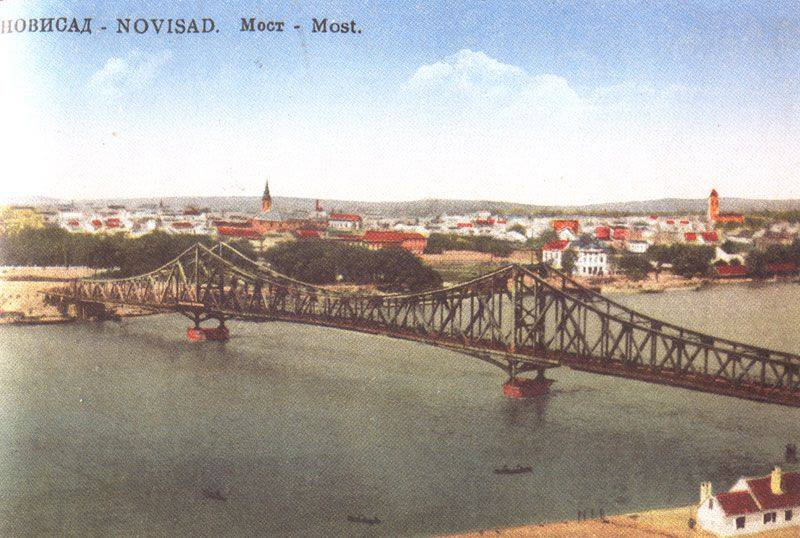
Postcard of Prince Tomislav Bridge in Novi Sad, 1930s

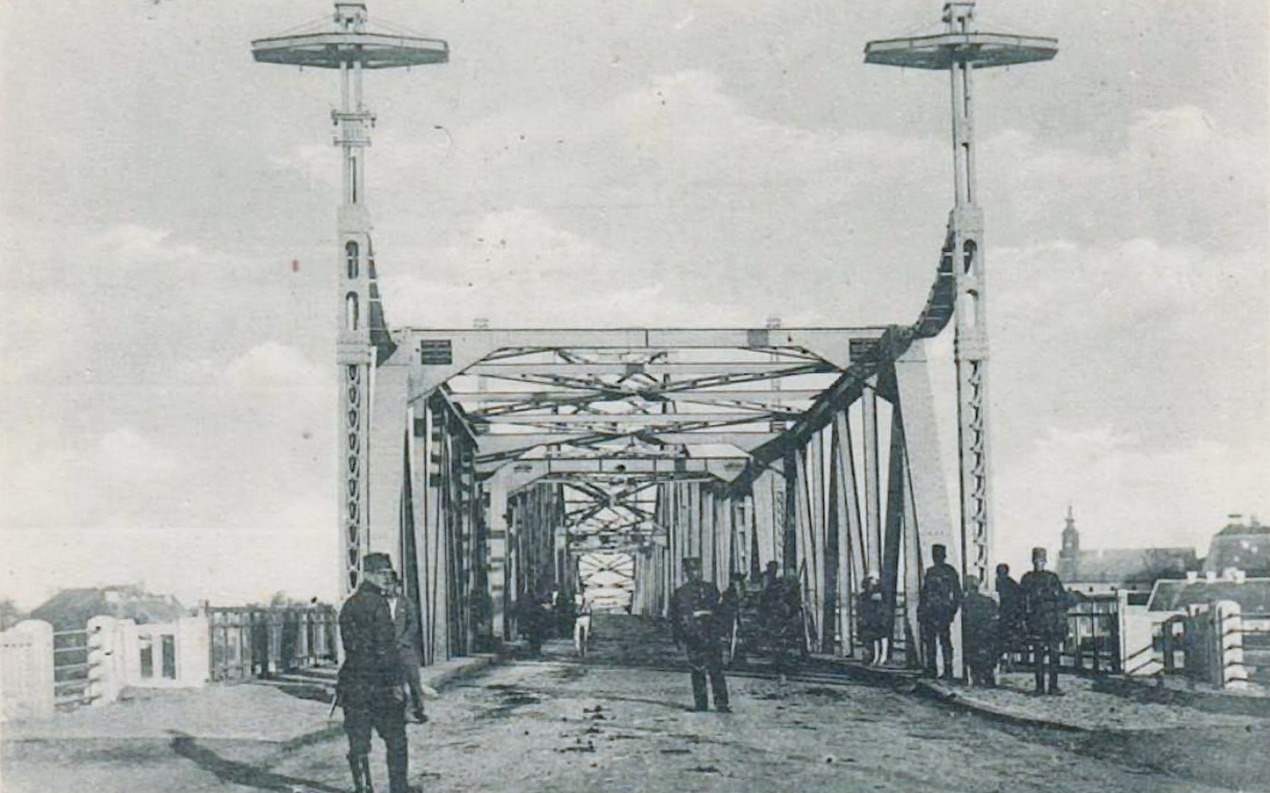
Entrance to the Prince Tomislav Bridge from Novi Sad

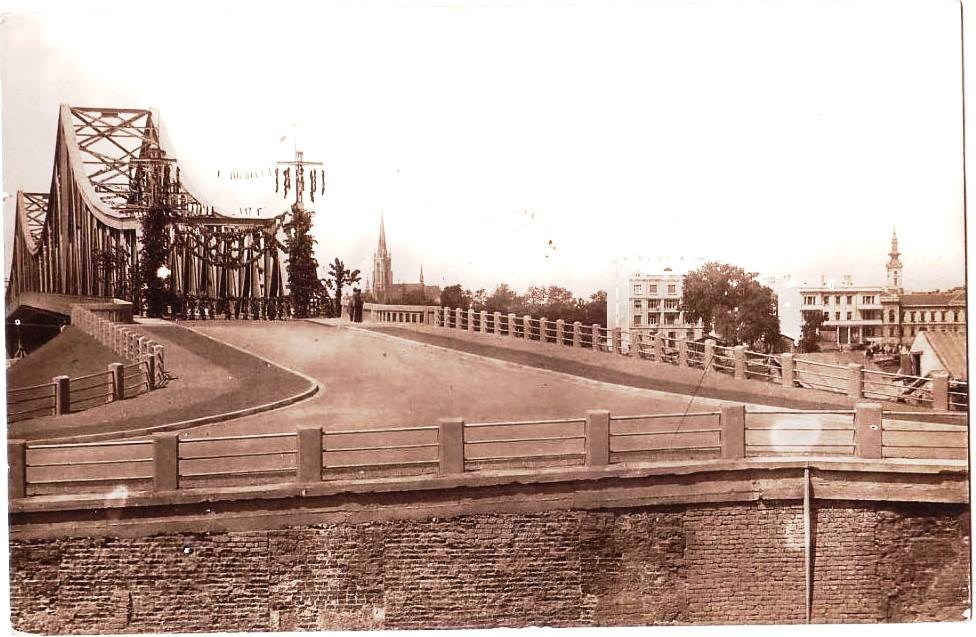
Entrance to the Prince Tomislav Bridge from Petrovaradin

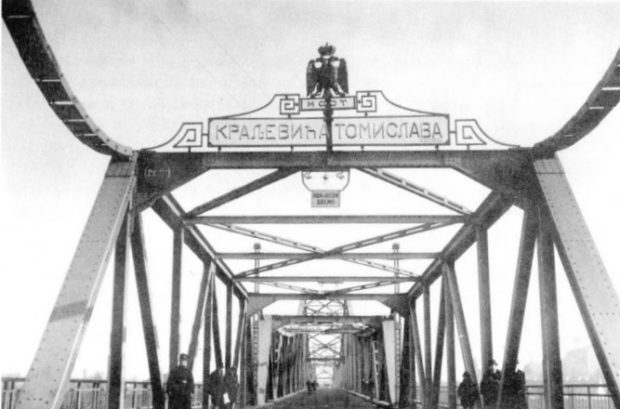
Sign on the Prince Tomislav Bridge

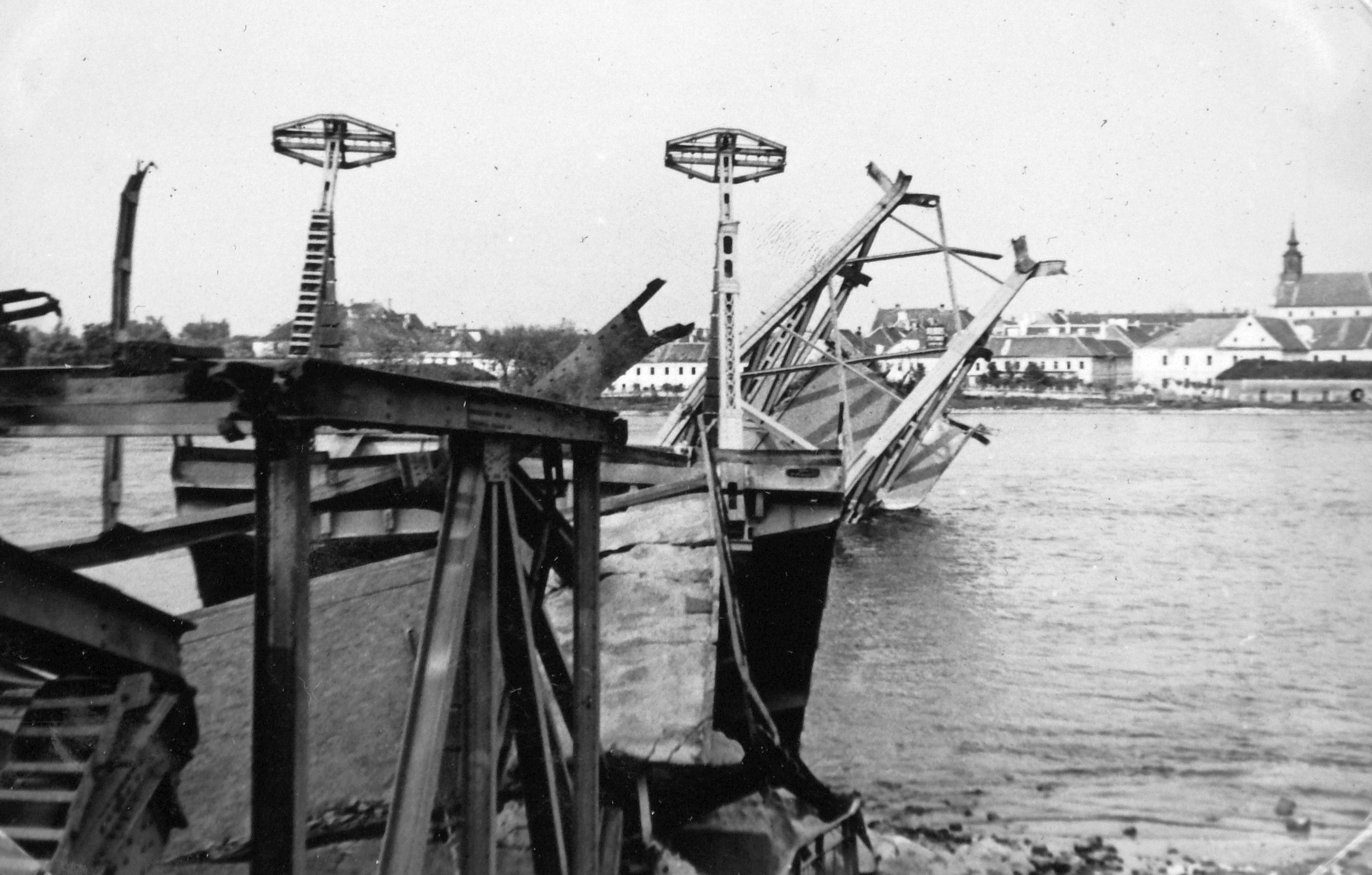
Destroyed Bridge, 1941

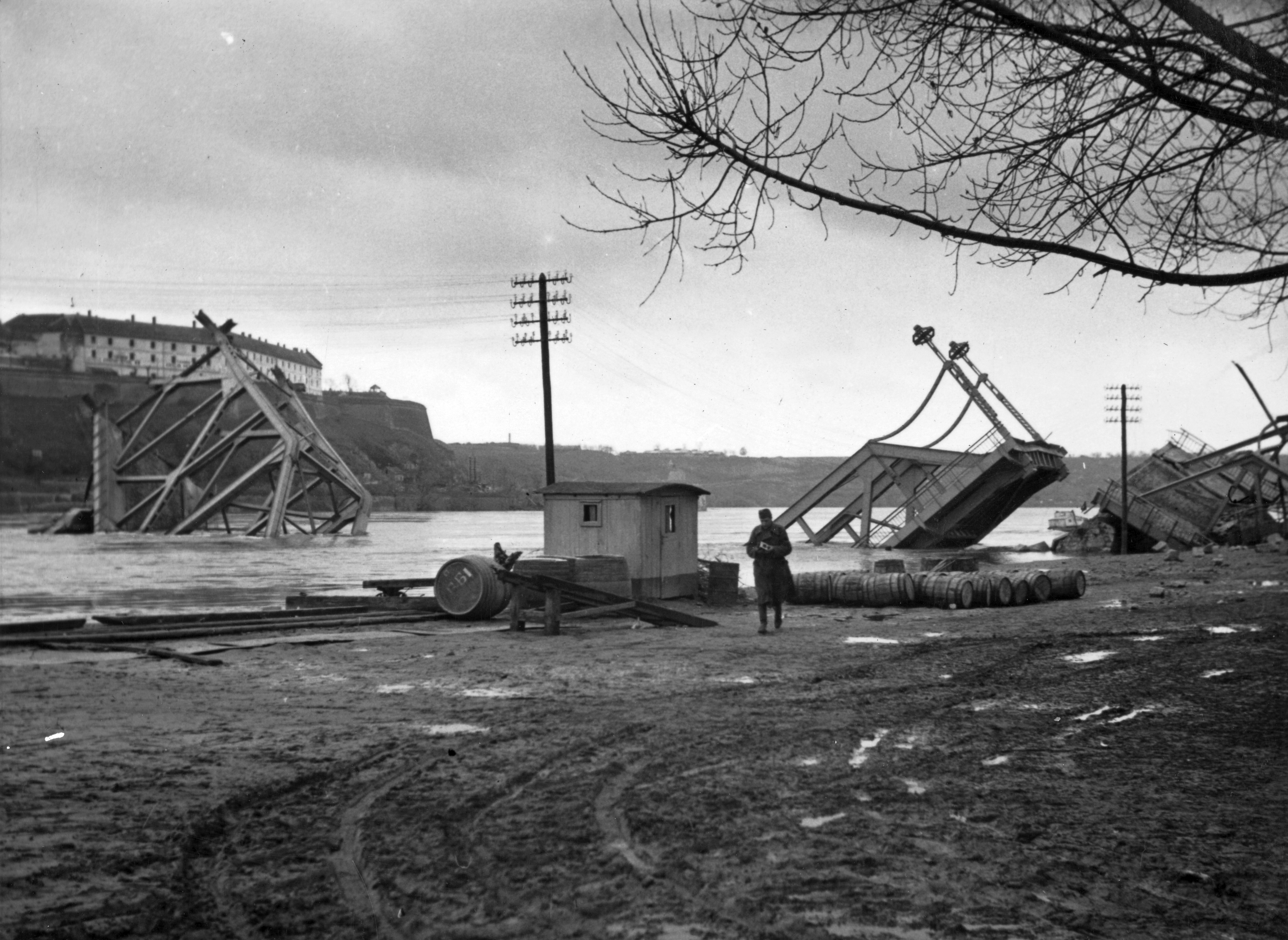
Destroyed Bridge, 1941

== See also ==
- List of bridges in Serbia
- List of crossings of the Danube
