= Transport in Novi Sad =

This is an article about the transport infrastructure of Novi Sad, Serbia.

== Roads ==
Novi Sad is connected by a motorway to Belgrade to the south-east and to Subotica and Hungary to the north. The city has 369 km of roads as of 2004. The main arteries in the city are the 3 km long Liberation Boulevard, the Europe Boulevard, Futoška Road, and Temerinska Road.

== Bridges ==
As of 2024, there are twelve bridges in Novi Sad municipal area. Eight bridges (six in service) cross the Danube-Tisa-Danube Canal, and four cross the Danube river. Throughout history, many bridges were built and then destroyed during the many wars in this region.

=== Danube Bridges ===
These are current bridges over river Danube (from west):

- Liberty Bridge (Most Slobode), built in 1981 in the extension of the Liberation Boulevard connecting Mišeluk with the city center. It was destroyed in 1999 and then rebuilt in 2005. It connects Sremska Kamenica with the city center.
- Varadin Bridge (Varadinski most), built in 2000 to connect Petrovaradin with the city center.
- Danube Railway–Road Bridge (Železničko-drumski most preko Dunava) also known as New Žeželj Bridge (Novi Žeželjev most), built in 2018, on the location of Žeželj Bridge. Its railway connects Subotica and Belgrade with Novi Sad.
- Beška Bridge (Most kod Beške), built in 1975, situated between villages Kovilj and Beška. It was expanded in 2011. It is a part of highway E75.
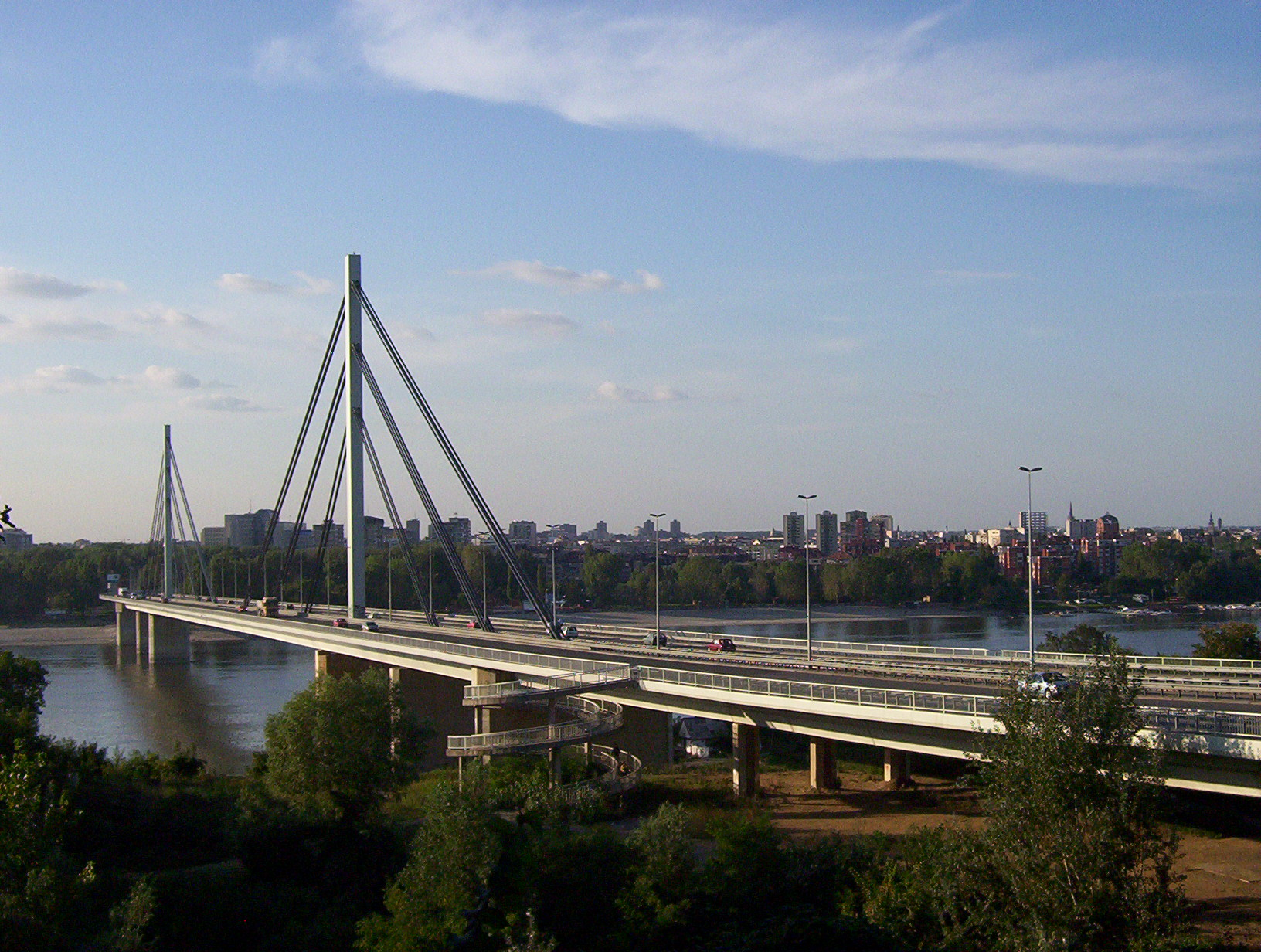
Liberty Bridge

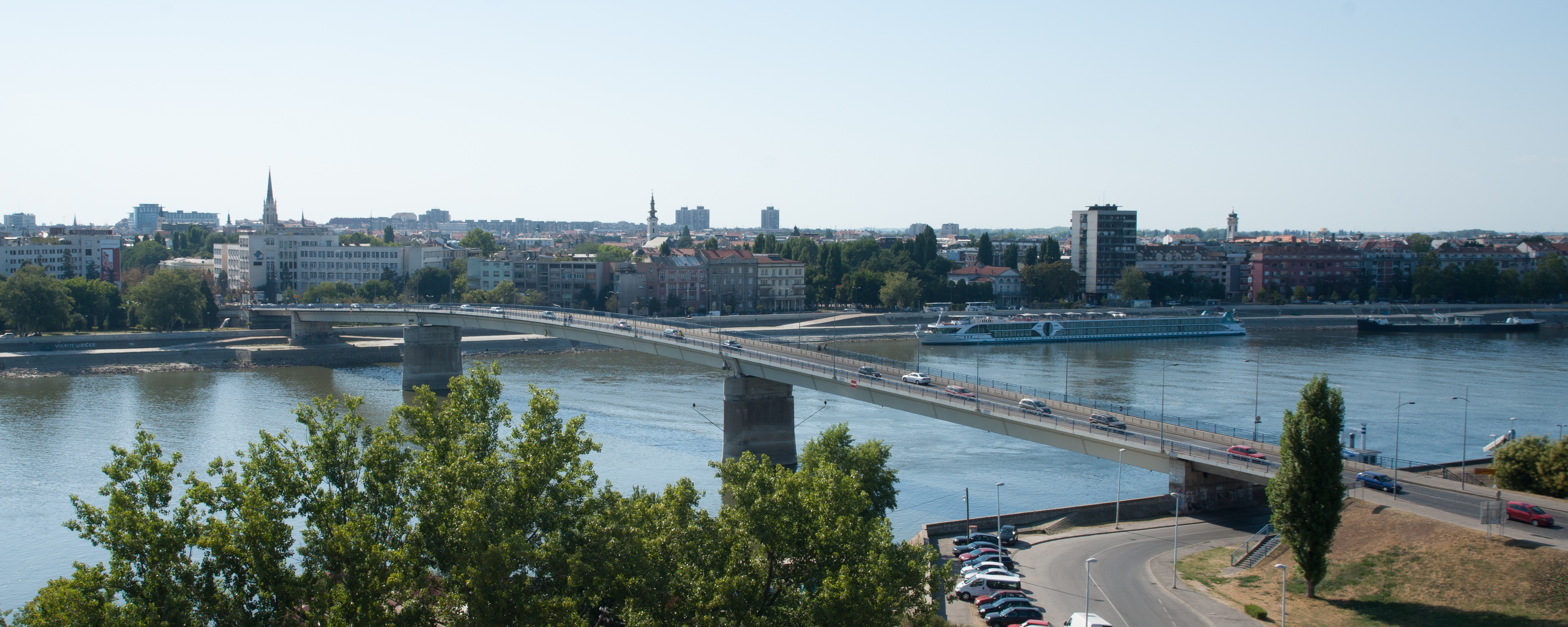
Varadin Bridge

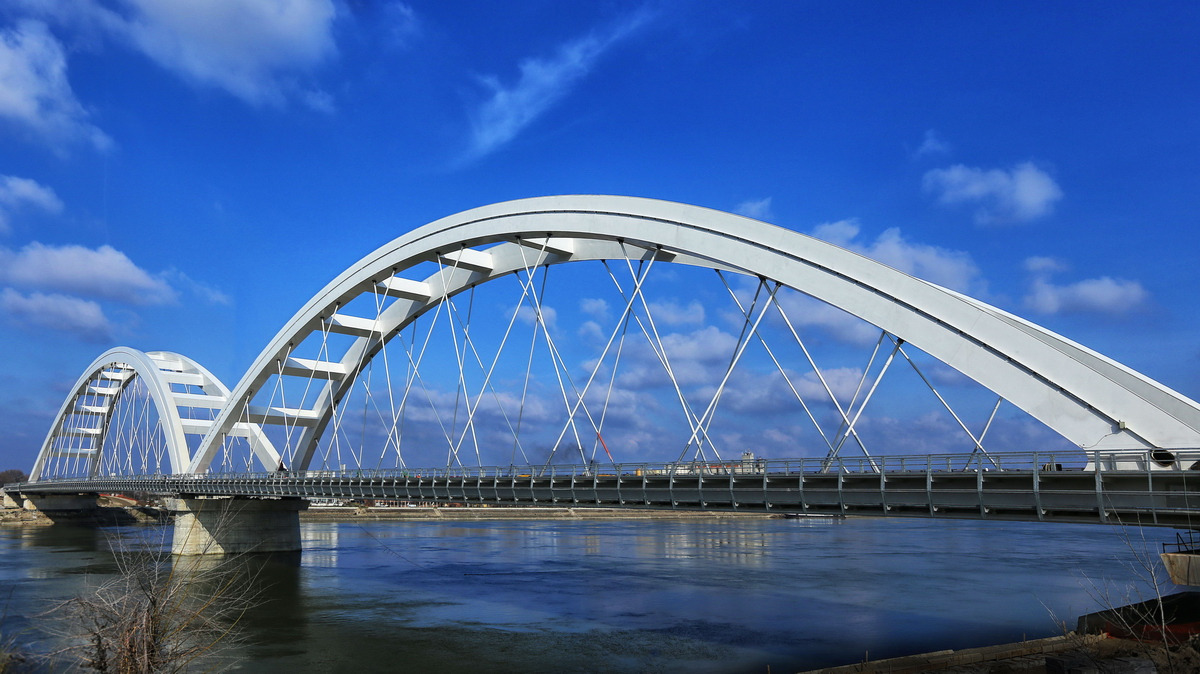
New Žeželj Bridge

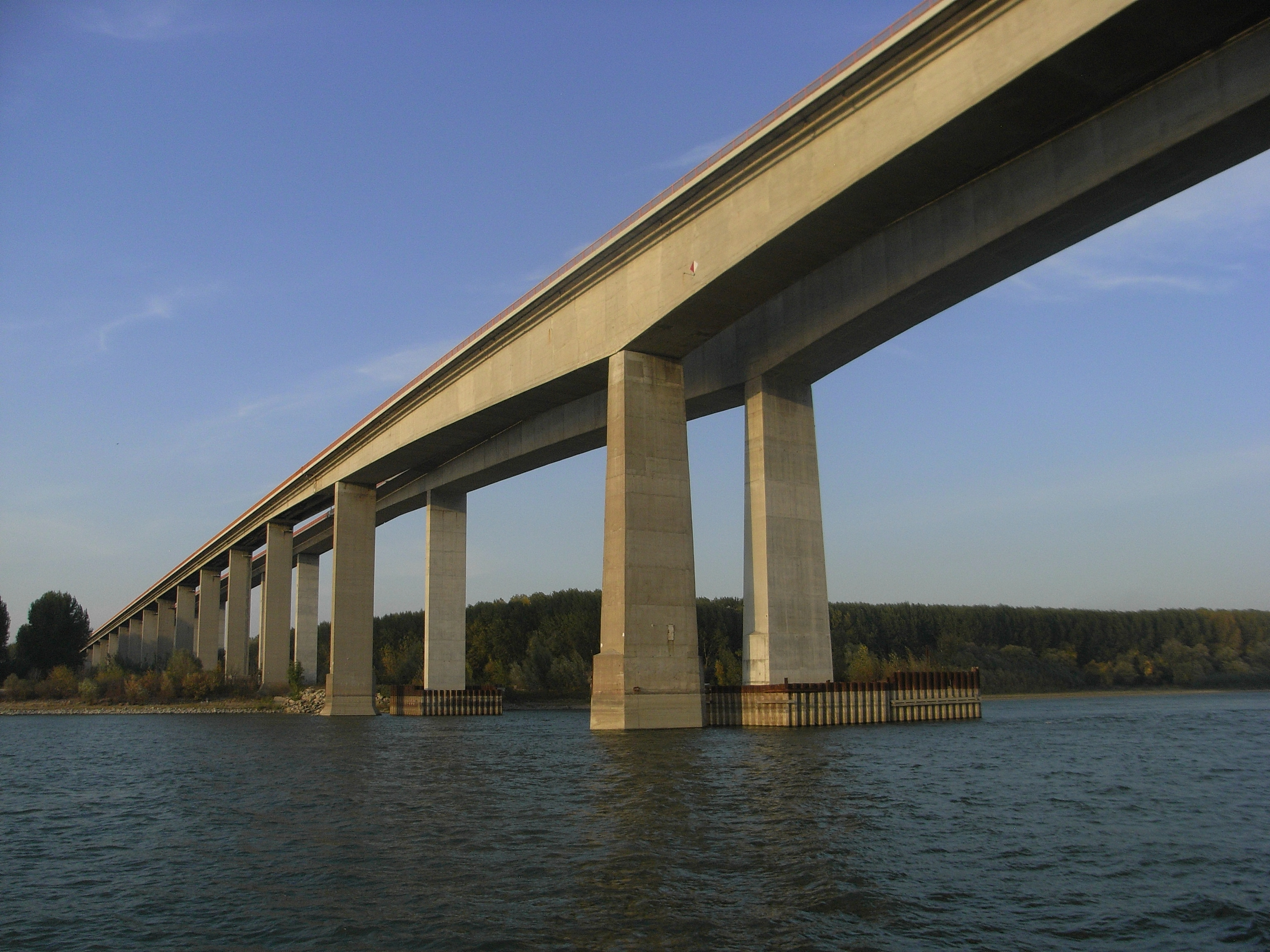
Beška Bridge

Former bridges on the Danube:

- Hagen Bridge (Hagenov most), built in 1788, removed in 1918. First road bridge in Novi Sad. The bridge was removed due to the beginning constructions of the Prince Tomislav Bridge.
- Railway Bridge (Železnički most), built on 11 November 1883, destroyed on 11 April 1941 by Yugoslav army to slow down the German advances to the south. Rebuilt in 1941, destroyed again on 22 October 1944 by the German forces during their retreat. It was currently the longest standing permanent bridge in Novi Sad, lasting for 61 years. Known as Emperor Franz Joseph Bridge (Most cara Franca Jozefa), after WWI it was renamed to Prince Andrew Bridge (Most kraljevića Andreja). Until WWI, the famous Orient Express passed through this bridge. Most bridge piers exist to this day. One of the piers was decorated as the Yellow Submarine for the 2022 Exit Music Festival.
- Potiorek Bridge (Poćorekov most), built in 1915, collapsed due to ice on 18 February 1924 and was demolished in the summer of the same year.
- Pontoon Bridge (Pontonski most), built in 1924, removed in 1928. Temporary solution until the construction of the Prince Tomislav Bridge.
- Prince Tomislav Bridge (Most kraljevića Tomislava), built in 1928, destroyed in 1941 by Yugoslav army to slow down the German advances to the south.
- Pontoon Bridge (Pontonski most), built in 1945, removed in 1946. Temporary solution until the construction of Marshal Tito Bridge.
- Marshal Tito Bridge (Most Maršala Tita), built in 1946, named after Josip Broz Tito. Renamed to Varadin Bridge (Varadinski most) in 1991, destroyed in 1999. It was used as a road and railway bridge until 1962, after the construction of the Žeželj Bridge.
- Žeželj Bridge (Žeželjev most), built in 1961 and destroyed in 1999. Also known as the Brotherhood and Unity Bridge (Most bratstva i jedinstva). Its railway connected Subotica and Belgrade with Novi Sad.
- Pontoon Bridge (Pontonski most), built on 6 September 1999, removed in 2005. Temporary solution until the rebuilding of the Liberty Bridge. Constructed between the piers of the Varadin Bridge and the Prince Andrew Bridge.
- Road-Railway Bridge (Drumsko-železnički most), also known as Boško Perošević Bridge (Most Boška Peroševića), built in 2000 as a temporary solution, because of the halted rail traffic in the aftermath of the NATO attacks in 1999. It had two lines of traffic, which were used for cars and heavy trucks. It was later replaced by the New Žeželj bridge, dismantled between October 2018 and March 2019.
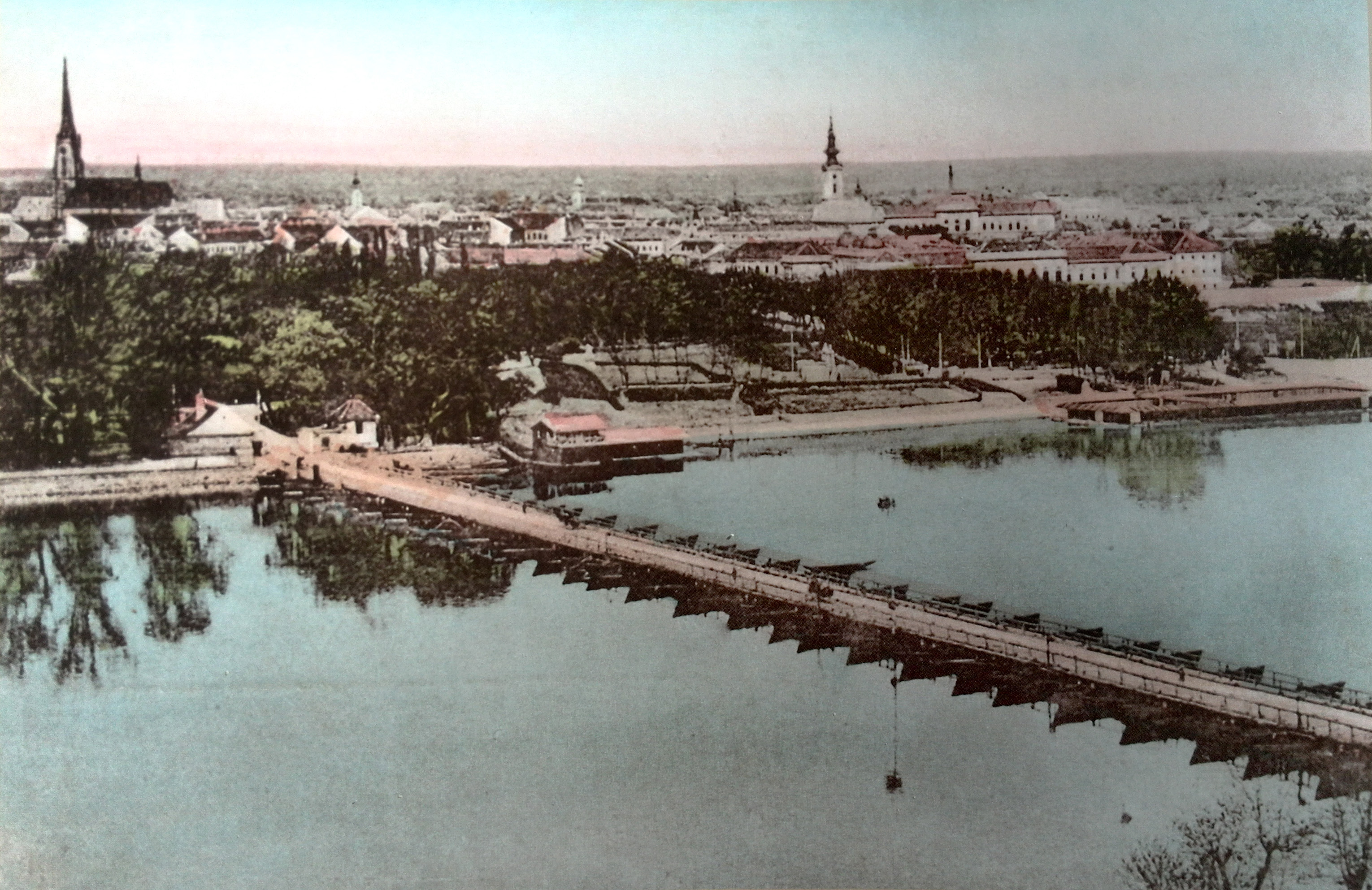
Hagen Bridge, 1788–1918

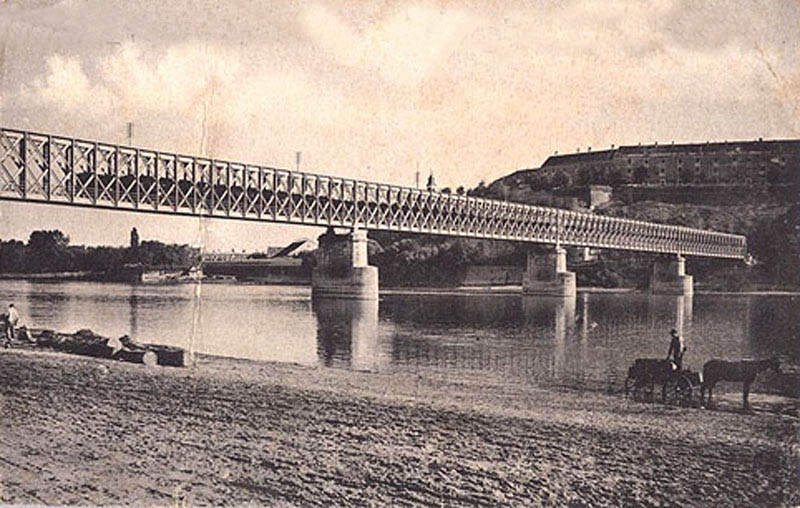
Prince Andrew Bridge, 1883–1944

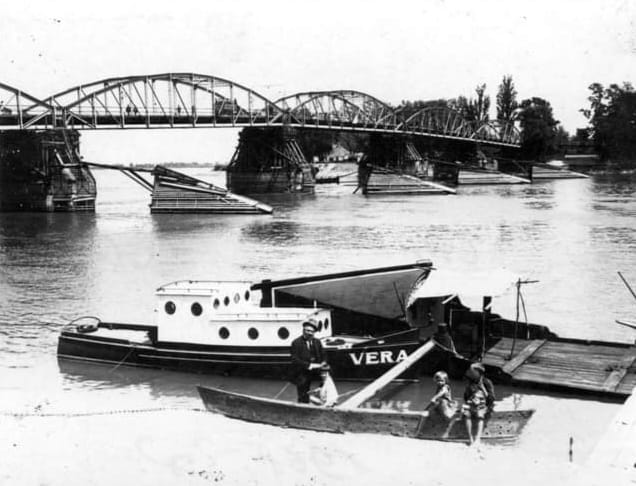
Potiorek Bridge, 1915–1924

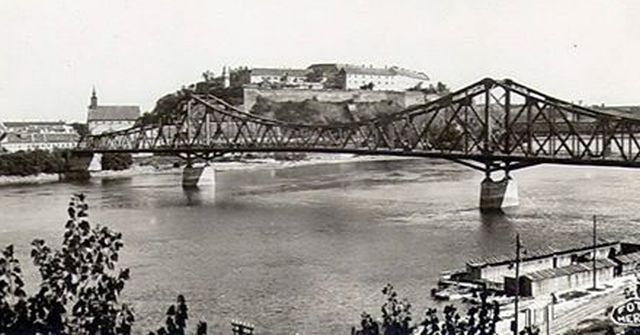
Prince Tomislav Bridge, 1928–1941

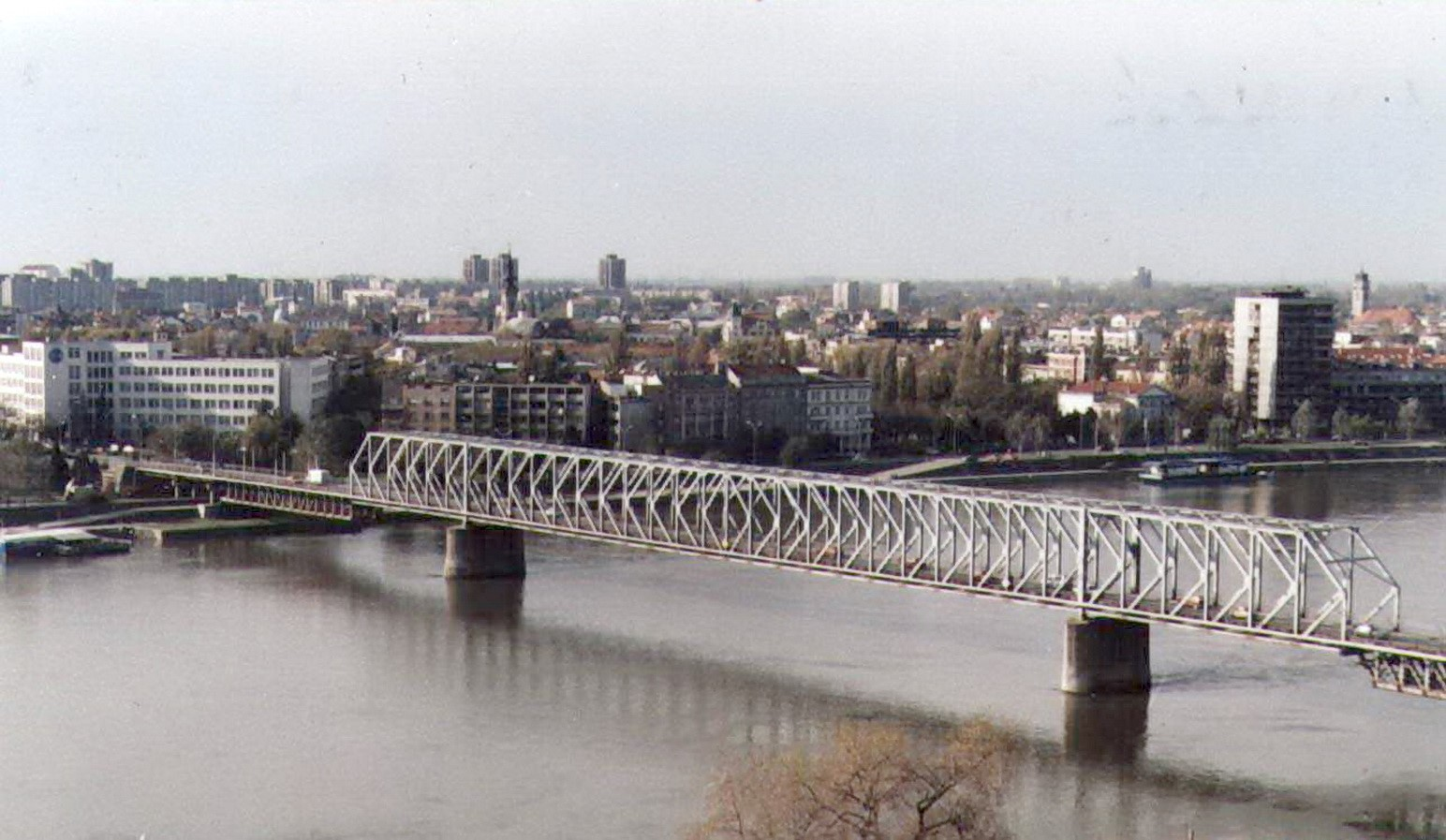
Marshal Tito Bridge, 1946–1999

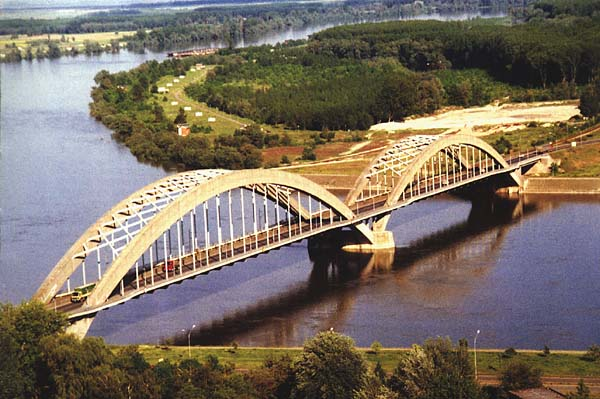
Žeželj Bridge, 1961–1999

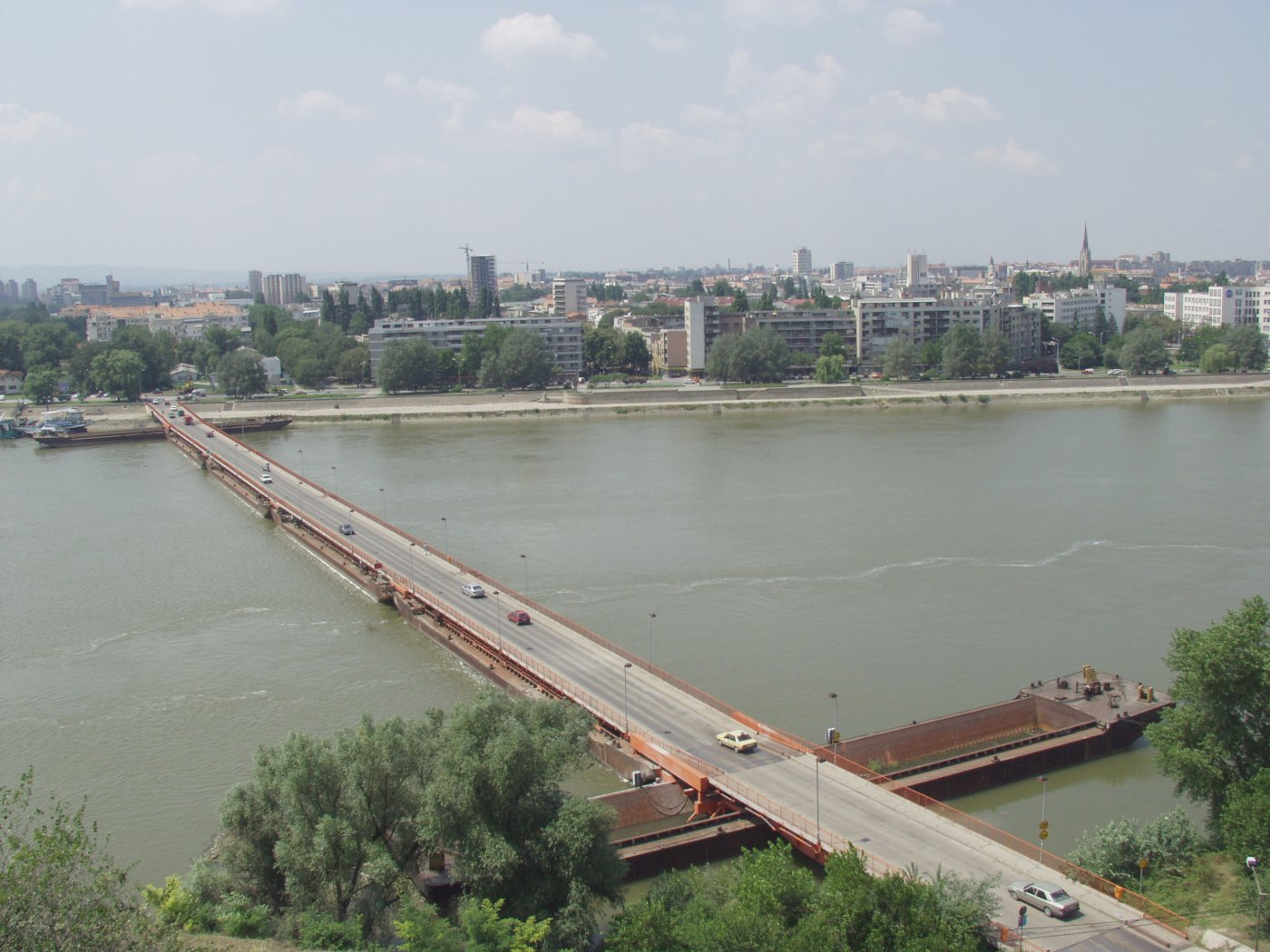
Pontoon Bridge, 1999–2005

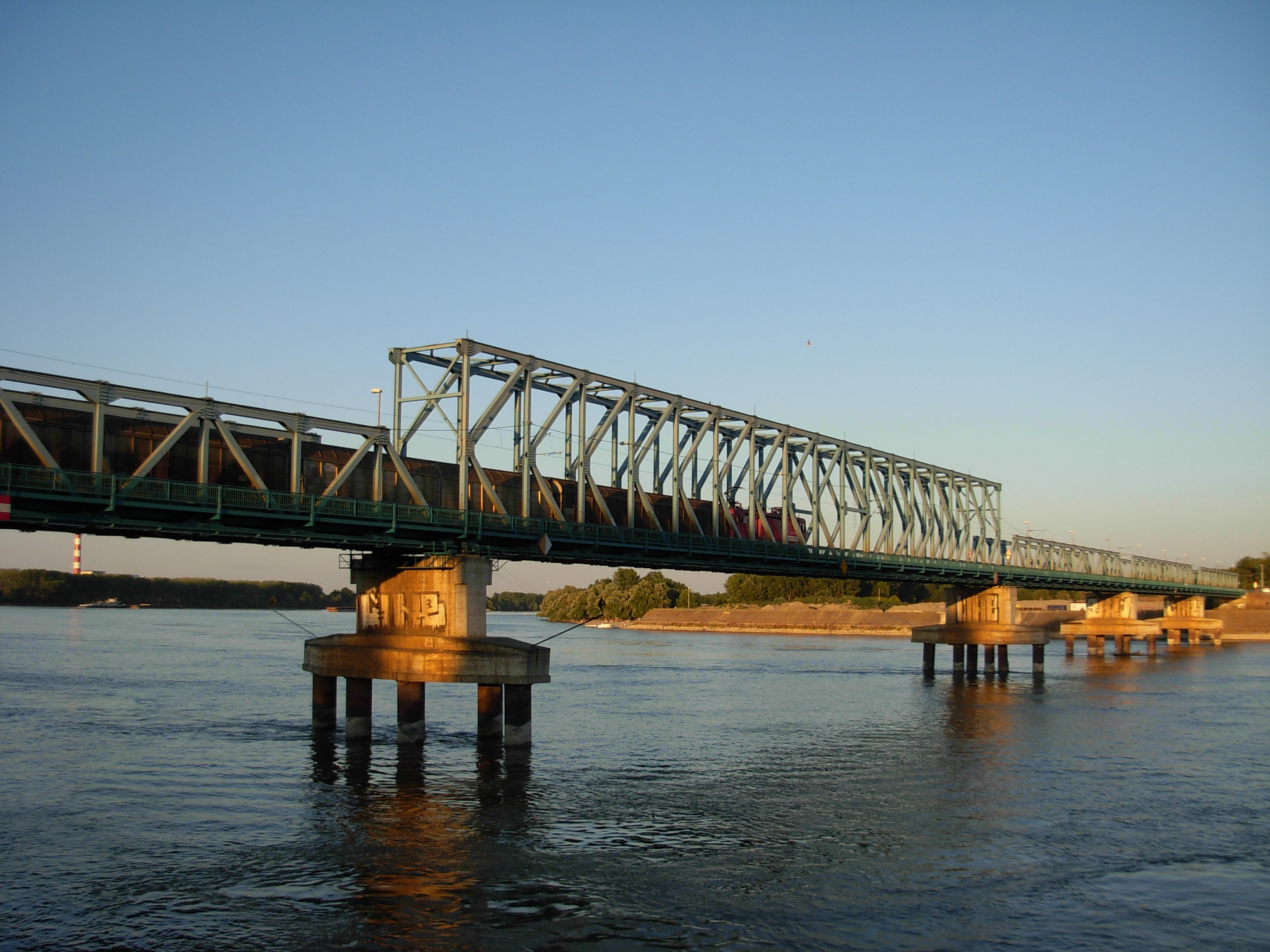
Boško Perošević Bridge, 2000–2019

Planned bridges on the Danube:

- Forth Bridge in Novi Sad (Četvrti most u Novom Sadu), also known as the Chinese Bridge (Kineski most), a cable-stayed road bridge that would be built at the extension of the Europe Boulevard and would connect Novi Sad and Sremska Kamenica. Built by China Road and Bridge Corporation costing 175.5 million euros, it will be 2,600 meters long (880 meters for the river span, 1,320 meters for the elevated road), 29.4 meters wide (4 lanes of roads, 2 pedestrian walkways), with three 30 meters tall spires, each with 11 cable wires. Construction started in May 2024 and is planned to be finished in December 2026
- Fifth Bridge in Novi Sad (Peti most u Novom Sadu), a cable-stayed road bridge that would connect Petrovaradin with the Industrial Zone Sever IV, connecting with the Subotica—Novi Sad highway, part of the Fruška Gora road corridor. Built by China Road and Bridge Corporation costing 80 million Serbian dinars, it will be 1,765 meters long (505.75 meters for the river span) and between 25 and 28 meters wide. Construction started in May 2022 and is planned to be finished by the end 2026.
- Pedestrian and bike bridge in Novi Sad (Pešačko-biciklistički most u Novom Sadu) of a truss design that would be built at the extension of Cara Lazara Boulevard (at the site of the former Prince Andrew Bridge) and would connect Novi Sad and Petrovaradin. Designed by Fedor Jurić, Ognjen Graovac, Ivan Šuić, Martina Milošević, Milka Gnjato and Ivan Zuliani. Built by Shandong company costing 40 million euros, the bridge will be 450 meters long, 12 meters wide (6 meter pedestrian walkways, 1.5 meters for decorations, 3 meters for bike paths) and connect to the 355 meter long Guido Pesapane tunnel. The construction is planned to start in the later half of 2024.
- Road bridge at Bačka Palanka and Neštin (Most kod Bačke Palanke i Neština) of a Box girder design that would connect Bačka Palanka with Neštin, bypassing the Ilok–Bačka Palanka Bridge bordering with Ilok in Croatia and funnel most of the western road traffic from Syrmia that went through Novi Sad. The bridge will be 3,500 meters long (1,915 meters for the river span). Designed by DB Inženjering, construction will be done by Spanish Cеntunion company.

=== Canal Bridges ===
Bridges over the Danube-Tisa-Danube Canal (from west):

- The Futog Bridge (Futoški most) is a small bridge part of Irmovački put (Irmovački road) which is mainly used by local farming communities from the surrounding settlements of Kisač, Futog and Bački Petrovac.
- The Rumenka Bridge (Rumenački most), connecting Rumenka and Kisač.
- First New Railway Bridge on DTD canal (Prvi Novi Želežnički most na kanalu DTD), officially designated as Bridge KM81+644.83, a truss railway bridge that is part of the Budapest–Belgrade railway project from Novi Sad to Subotica. Constructed next to the location of the Old Railway Bridge over the canal. The bridge was built by China Railway International and China Communications Construction Company, invested by Serbian Railway Infrastructure. Construction started at the end 2022 and was finished in September 2024, opening for railway traffic after preliminary testing by December 2024.
- Second New Railway Bridge on DTD canal (Drugi Novi Želežnički most na kanalu DTD), officially designated as Bridge KM0+796.33, a truss railway bridge that is part of the railway route for Zrenjanin and Pančevo. Constructed on the location of the old railway bridge over the canal аnd next to an identical new railway bridge for the Subotica route, the bridge will was by China Railway International and China Communications Construction Company, invested by Serbian Railway Infrastructure. Construction started in June 2024, after the removal of the old railway bridge, and was finished at the beginning of 2025.
- The Zrenjanin Bridge (Zrenjaninski most), part of the Europe Boulevard, connects the city with the E75 highway from the west.
- The Klisa Bridge (Klisanski most), part of the Sentandrejski put (Saint Andrew road). It is in the city proper and it connects the neighborhoods of Klisa, Vidovdansko Naselje, and Slana Bara with the city centre, as well as the village of Čenej.
- The Temerin Bridge (Temerinski most) is part of Temerinski put (Temerin road). It connects neighborhoods Klisa, Vidovdansko Naselje, and Slana Bara with the city centre. Connects the city with the E75 highway, as well as with villages Čenej, Bački Jarak, and Temerin.
- The Kać Bridge (Kaćki most), it connects the city with the E75 highway from the east and some parts of Kać, Budisava and Kovilj.
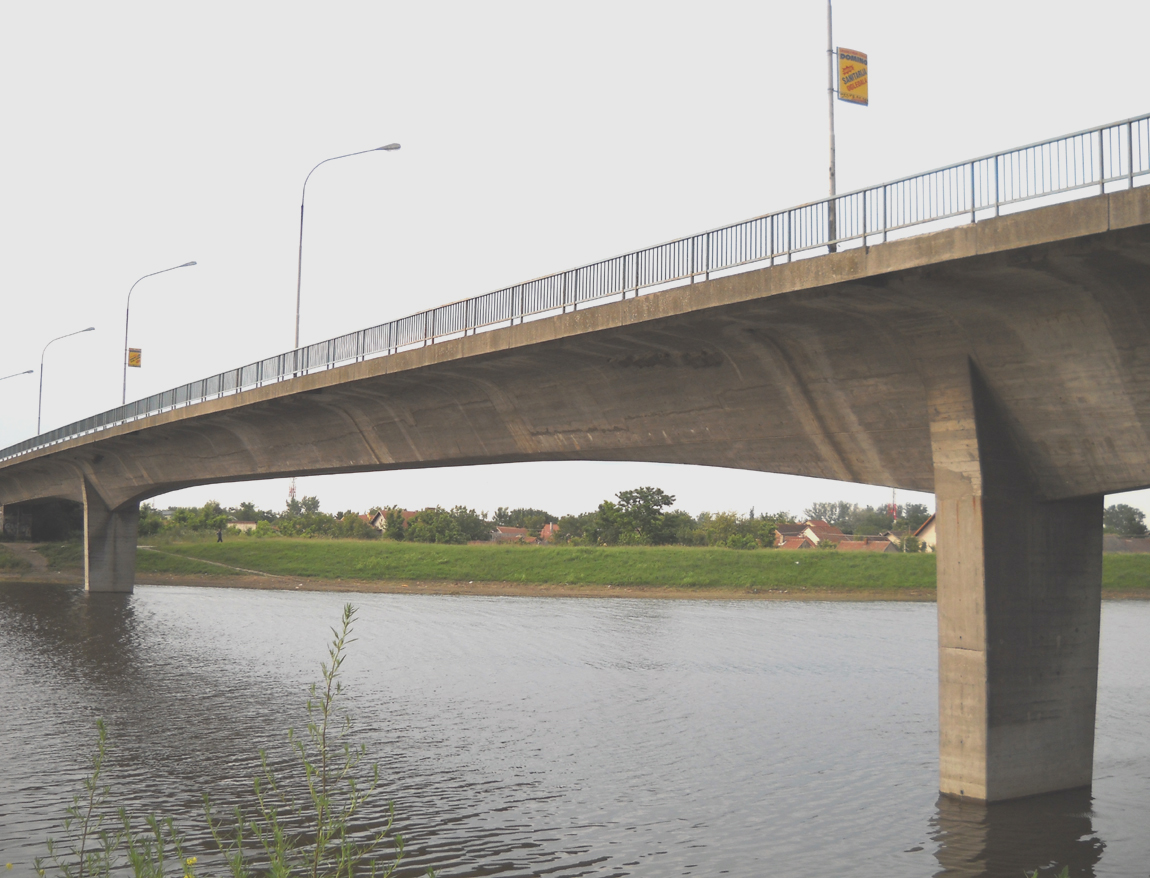
Klisa Bridge

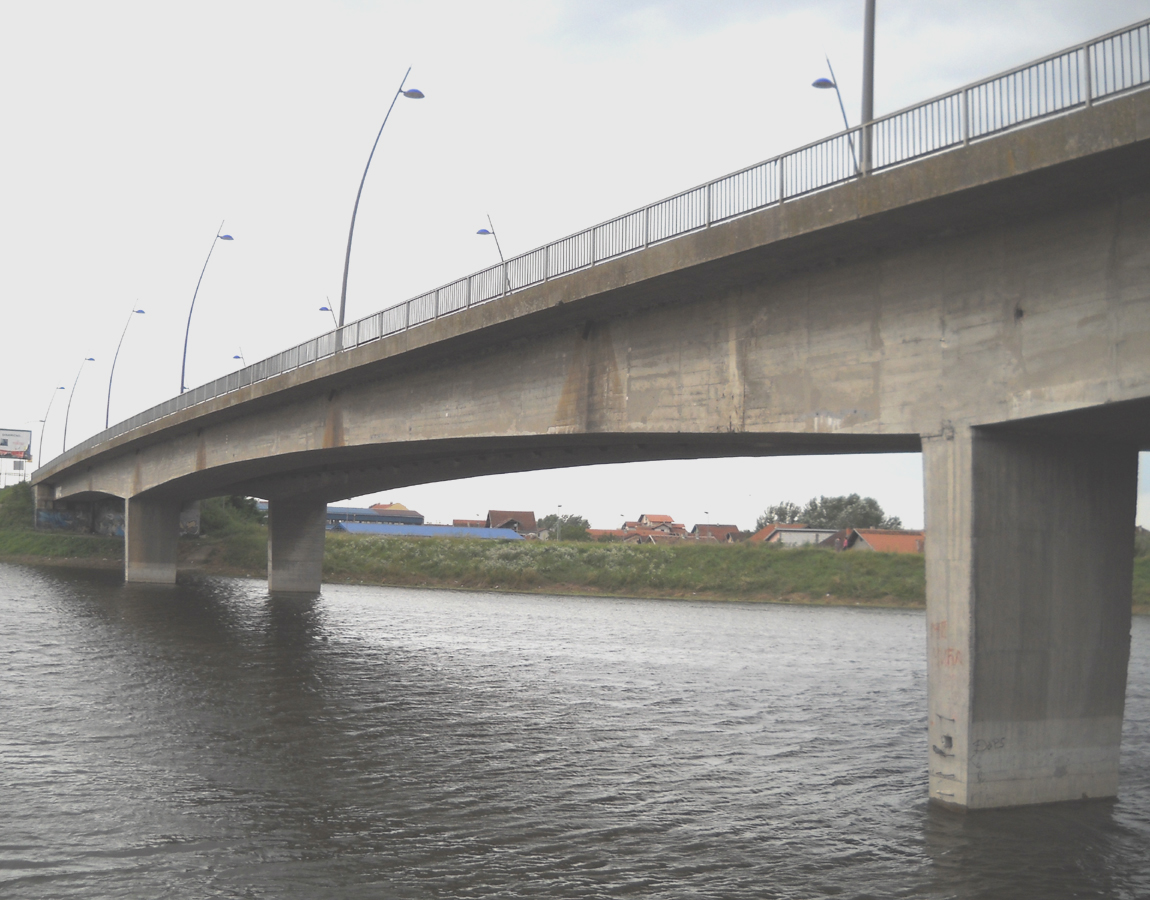
Temerin Bridge

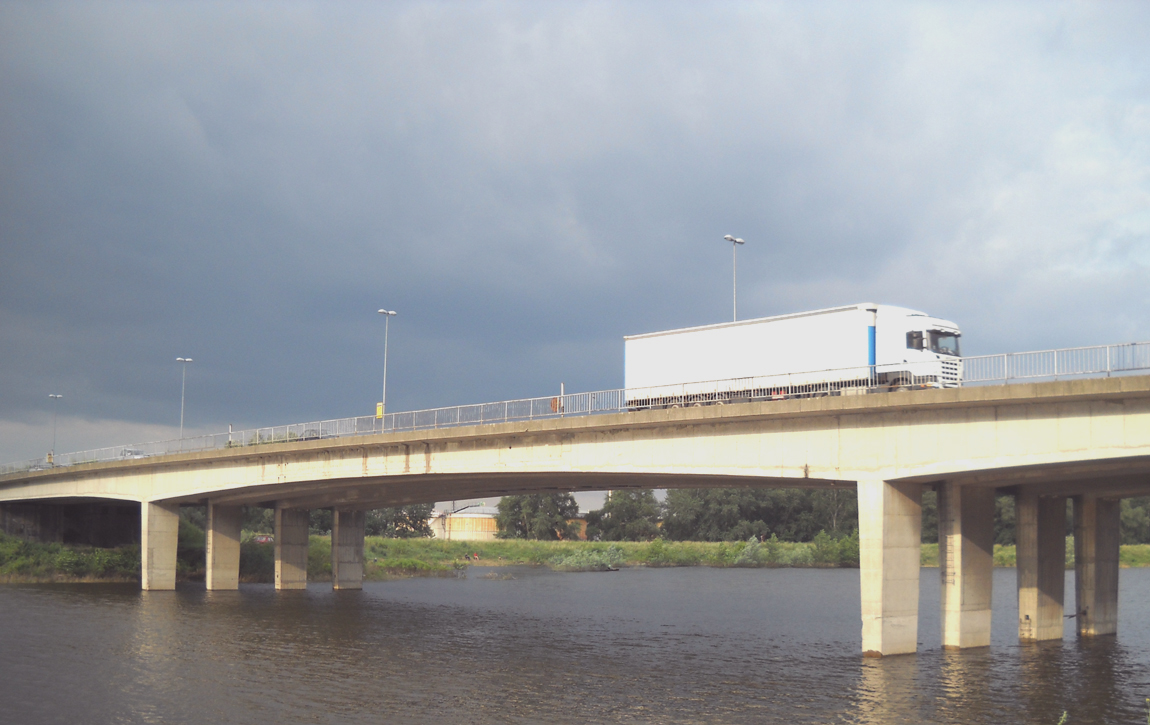
Kać Bridge

Former bridges on the Danube-Tisa-Danube Canal:

- Old Railway Bridge on DTD canal (Stari Železnički most na kanalu DTD) was part of the old railway route from Novi Sad to Subotica. It closed down due to the construction of the high-speed Budapest–Belgrade railway project from Novi Sad to Subotica and the construction of the New Railway Bridge over the canal. Dismantle of the old bridge started in early April 2024 and completed by May 2024, with the canal temporarily closed for ship traffic during that period.

Planned bridges on the Danube-Tisa-Danube Canal:

- Pedestrian and bike bridge on DTD canal (Pešačko-biciklistički most na kanalu DTD) of a truss design that would be built at the extension of the city quay, at the confluence of the DTD Canal and the Danube. Designed by architects from ARCVS bureau, Branislav Redžić, Dragan Ivanović, Zoran Milovanović, Dušan MIlošev, Milica Tasić, Nevenka Redžić. Engineered by Sreto Kuzmanović and Vanja Vukadinović Đurić.

== Railway ==
The main railway station is situated in the Banatić neighborhood next to the main city bus station, not too far from the city center. The lines from it connect Novi Sad with major towns in Vojvodina, such as Subotica, Sombor, Bačka Topola, Vrbas, Zrenjanin, Pančevo, Inđija and the Serbian capital, Belgrade.

The Soko high-speed train (its name meaning falcon in English) connects Belgrade and Novi Sad with a journey time of up to 36 minutes since 19 March 2022. With maximum speed of 200 km/h, it is the fastest train in Serbia. The high speed train connection with Subotica is planned to be completed by December 2024, with a completed high-speed train connected with Budapest planned to be completed by the end of 2025.

There is some talk that if Novi Sad continues to develop at this pace, it would be desirable that, in addition to this transport infrastructure, it should also get a metro system due to heavy traffic congestion, which will continue to increase.

== Shipping ==
Novi Sad has the commercial Port of Novi Sad on the banks of the Danube and the Danube-Tisa-Danube Canal. There is also a tourist port near Varadin Bridge in the city centre welcoming various river cruise vessels from across Europe. Novi Sad has several water-sports marinas near Ribarsko Ostrvo (such as Marina Špic), Liman and Petrovaradin harbouring small sailboats and sporting/recreational vessels.

== Aviation ==
Novi Sad has one airfield, Čenej Airfield, with a grass runway. It is used for small aircraft, mainly for farming and sporting purposes, operated by Aero Club Novi Sad. It is situated next to the village of Čenej, about 10 km north from Novi Sad. The nearest international airport is Belgrade Nikola Tesla Airport about 90 km to the south, 90 minutes from Novi Sad. Since 2012, there have been plans to expand the location into an airport to service passenger, business, low cost and cargo flights.

== Public transportation ==
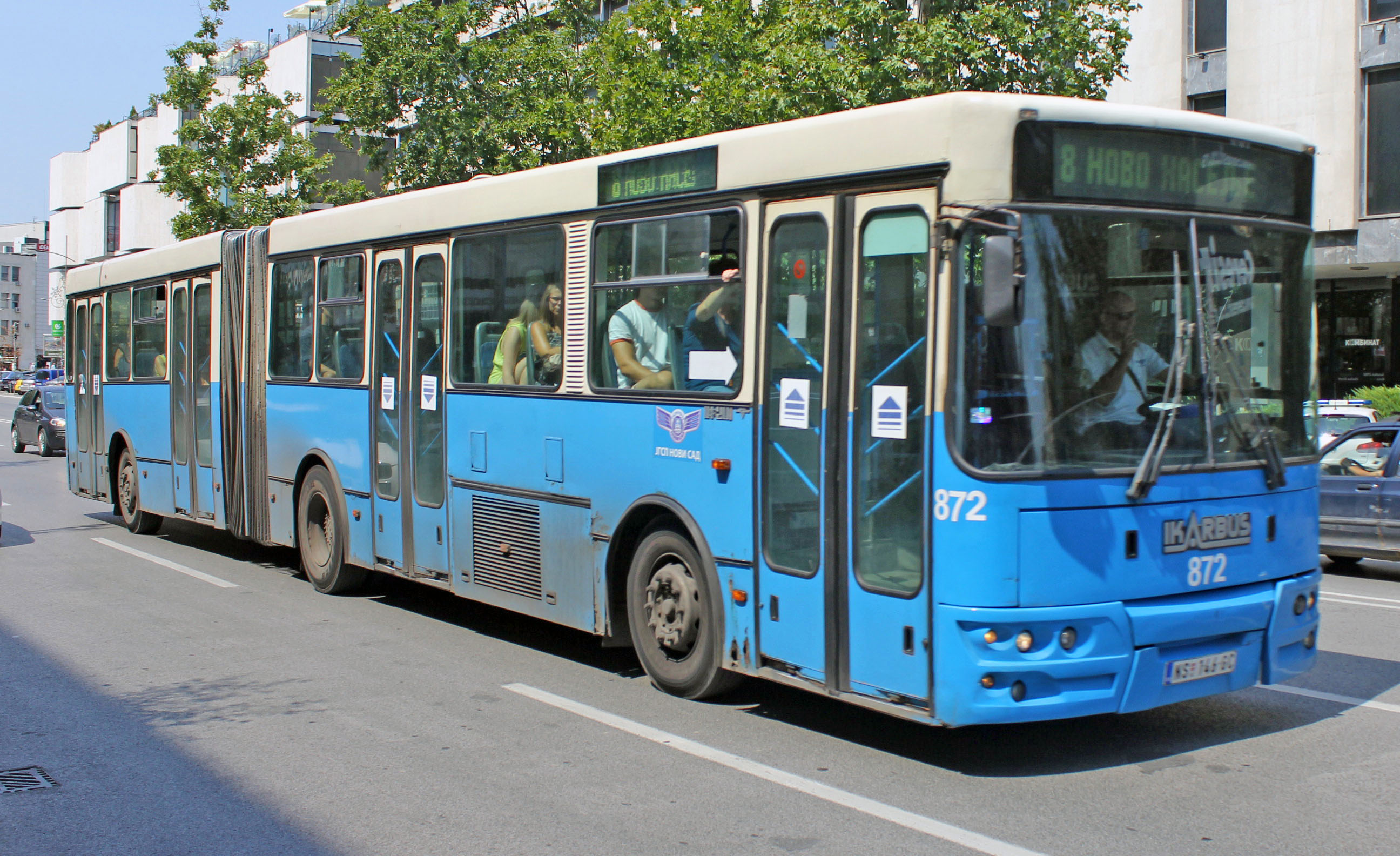
A bus serving Novi Sad's Line 8, painted with characteristic blue.

The main public transportation system in Novi Sad consists of bus lines, operated by JGSP Novi Sad. As of July 2024 these are 20 bus lines connecting the urban parts of Novi Sad and Petrovaradin, with their own additional sub lines.

There are also 38 lines with their own additional sub lines which connect villages and towns in the Novi Sad municipality, as well as villages and towns in surrounding municipalities of Beočin, Temerin and Sremski Karlovci, Žabalj and Inđija. Bus transport is operated by JGSP Novi Sad. The bus lines in the city proper have numbers from 1 to 20, with additional letters indicating the left or right lane for the lines and additional route variations.

The transport network relies extensively on natural gas-powered buses, which comprise more than a half of all vehicles used for the public transport. Novi Sad has the largest amount of such buses in Serbia. In addition to those, the city also uses Solaris Urbino 12 electric buses.

There are also various taxi companies serving the city.
