= Port of Novi Sad =

Port of Novi Sad Лука Нови Сад
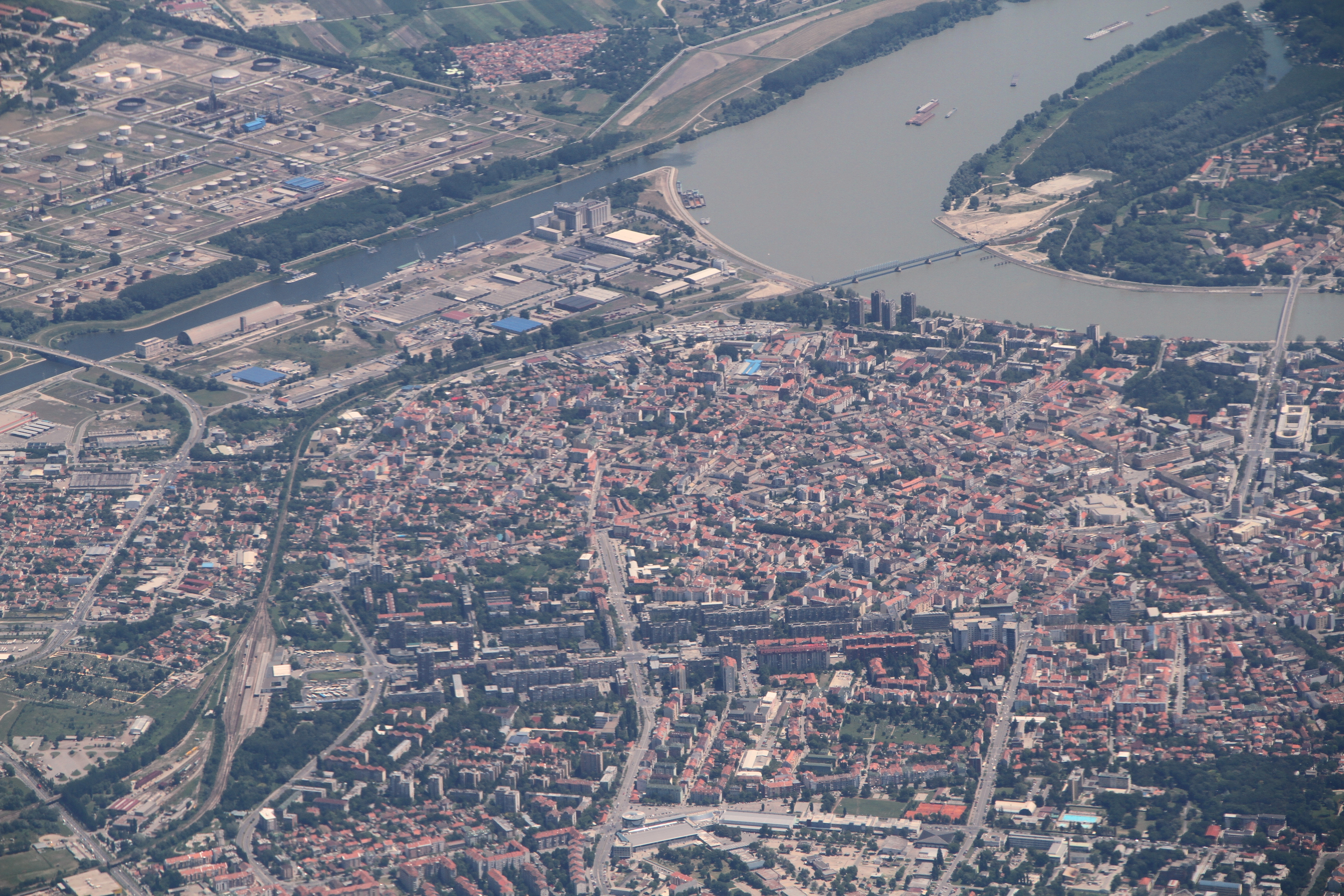
- Port of Novi Sad (upper corner of the areal view)

Location
- Country: Serbia
- Location: Carinska 1, Novi Sad
- Coordinates: 45°16′07″N 19°51′17″E

Details
- Opened: 26 October 1982; 42 years ago
- Operated by: DP World
- Type of harbour: Artificial
- Employees: 154 (2018)
- General Director: George-Claudiu Negreanu
- Warehouse space: 79,609 square metres (856,900 sq ft)

Statistics
- Annual cargo tonnage: 1,180,000 (2016); 1,338,509 (2023)
- Annual revenue: ▲€3.75 million (2018)
- Net income: ▼€0.02 million (2018)
- Website; DP World Novi Sad

The Port of Novi Sad (Serbian: Лука Нови Сад), officially named DP World Novi Sad, is a cargo and passenger port on the Danube river in Novi Sad, Serbia.

== Location ==
DP World Novi Sad is located in the central part of Vojvodina, the northern province of the Republic of Serbia. It is located in the city of Novi Sad on the 1,254 km left bank of the Danube river and at the very end of the Danube-Tisa-Danube Canal. This location where the river Corridor VII and the land Corridor X intersect forms a hub for international communication and transport. The strength of the location of this port is not only geographical: It also has transport links, only 0.3 km from the railway Corridor X and 3 km from the land Corridor X.

All international ports on the Danube downstream of Novi Sad are connected to the east: Bulgaria (Lom, Ruse), Romania (Cernavodă, Brăila, Galați) and Ukraine (Reni, Izmail). The river also connects with ports on the Black Sea, and through them to the Mediterranean, Atlantic and Indian Oceans.

To the west of the Danube lies links with all international ports upstream of Novi Sad: In Hungary (Dunaújváros, Budapest), Slovakia (Komárno, Bratislava), Austria (Vienna, Linz, Enns), Germany (Deggendorf, Regensburg, Kelheim) and via the Rhine–Main–Danube Canal there are river connections with Germany, Switzerland, and Netherlands, towards the Atlantic Ocean and the North Sea.

DP World Novi Sad operates on a surface of 6 hectares, where the water depth is 4 to 10 metres. A 800-metre-long pier can accommodate up to five vessels at a time. DP World Novi Sad owns and operates closed warehouses with an area of 44,000 m2 and open warehouses with an area of 100,000 m2, consisting of public and customs warehouses.

== History ==
=== Early history ===
Since 1748, various historical documents have mentioned trade in Novi Sad and the docking of vessels on the Danube coast.

The river has been used to transport a variety of cargo, and there are accounts of a need to pay a toll to use the riverbank.

=== First port of Novi Sad ===
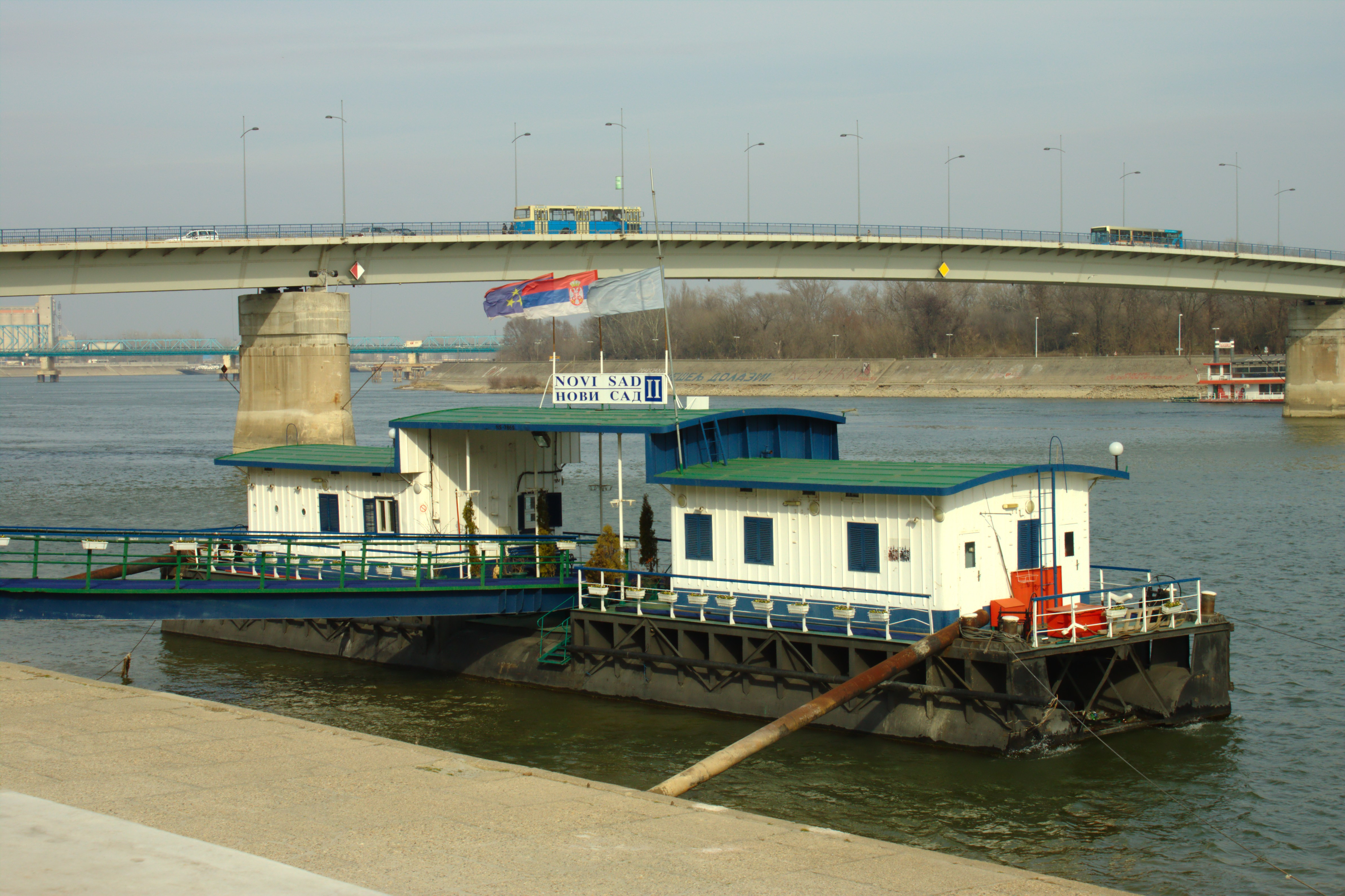
A river port for tourist ships on the Danube River in Novi Sad near Varadin Bridge, location of the first port

The port of Novi Sad was founded in 1910. The sailors anchored on the left bank of the Danube as close to the city core as possible. Between the two world wars, this was the largest trading port by volume in the former Yugoslavia.

After the end of World War II, the city of Novi Sad established a coastal transport company, located on the right bank of the Danube, from Majur to Petrovaradin. Activities registered were: the coastal transport service, work in the port and railway station, and work in customs and public warehouses.

Since July 1957, based on a decision by the Novi Sad authorities, the company has been operating under the new name of "Pristaništa i skladišta Novi Sad" (Docks and Warehouses of Novi Sad).

=== Second port of Novi Sad ===
In 1959, the government of the People's Republic of Serbia decided to finance the construction of a freight port in Novi Sad on the right bank of the DTD canal, whose excavation was nearing completion. The 0.4-1.2km stretch is envisioned to build a new port on the move between Novi Sad and Savi's village. The site currently houses DP World Novi Sad.

City authorities in Novi Sad decided, in 1963, to allocate land of 45 hectares, 58 ares and 61 square metres at a previously designated location on the DTD Canal for the construction of a cargo port and warehouse on a permanent and free-of-charge basis. In order to bring the land under control, from 1963 to 1973, about 3 million cubic metres of sand were deposited at the site where Luke will be built.

Starting in 1959, for the next ten years, the Port and Warehouse Company has operated independently. During this period, major projects were developed, the operational coast was constructed, crane tracks were built, and three 5-ton portal cranes were installed. The warehouses were not built because of the poor financial situation the company was in during that period.

In such an environment where the rules of the socialist economy were in place, the port and warehouse company was integrated into the financially more powerful "Heroj Pinki" enterprise. From 1969 to 1983, the integrated enterprise completed the construction of facilities for the operation of the harbour, closed warehouses, roads, railway tracks, water supply and sewage. In 1983, the Novi Sad city authorities decided to create a port and public warehouses out of the Heroj Pinki enterprise, so that employees of the two industrial units could start a new company called "Luka Novi Sad" (Port of Novi Sad). From then until today, the port operates as a separate company. By 1984, the federal Yugoslav government has declared the Port of Novi Sad an international river port.

=== Privatization ===
As of 2015, the Port of Novi Sad was the only port in Serbia that was state-owned, with other 11 ports being privatized. Since then, there were several unsuccessful attempts to privatize it. In 2016 calendar year, the Port of Novi Sad made a historic high load turnover of 1.18 million tonnes, the most of any port in Serbia.

In March 2019, the government of Serbia accepted the auction offer of "P&O Ports" to operate the port for 7.99 million euros. On 11 May, the agreement was finalized and "P&O Ports" thus was granted 25-year concession over the port.

In May 2022, DP World has invested 30 million euros in the reconstruction and modernization of the port that is scheduled to be completed in 2024. The reconstruction consists of a new vertical kay, container terminal, and wheat silos with the capacity of 40,000 m3. In September 2023, the vertical quay was completed. In June 2024, plans for a port urban project were revealed, which were established by the General Urban Plan of Novi Sad for 2030 for the detailed regulation of the industrial zone Sever III. The project consisting of 2.10 hectares includes elements such as port infrastructure and superstructures, constructed vertical quay, as well as reconstruction of the Ribarska and Kanalska streets.

As of 2023, the port has an annual cargo tonnage of 1.338 million tones, making it the fourth busiest port in Serbia (behind Belgrade, Smederevo, and Pančevo).

== See also ==
- Transport in Novi Sad
