= Corridor 7 =

Corridor 7 could refer to:

- Corridor 7: Alien Invasion a first-person shooter video game
- Pan-European Corridor VII an international river canal
