= Beška Bridge =

Beška Bridge Most kod Beške Мост код Бешке
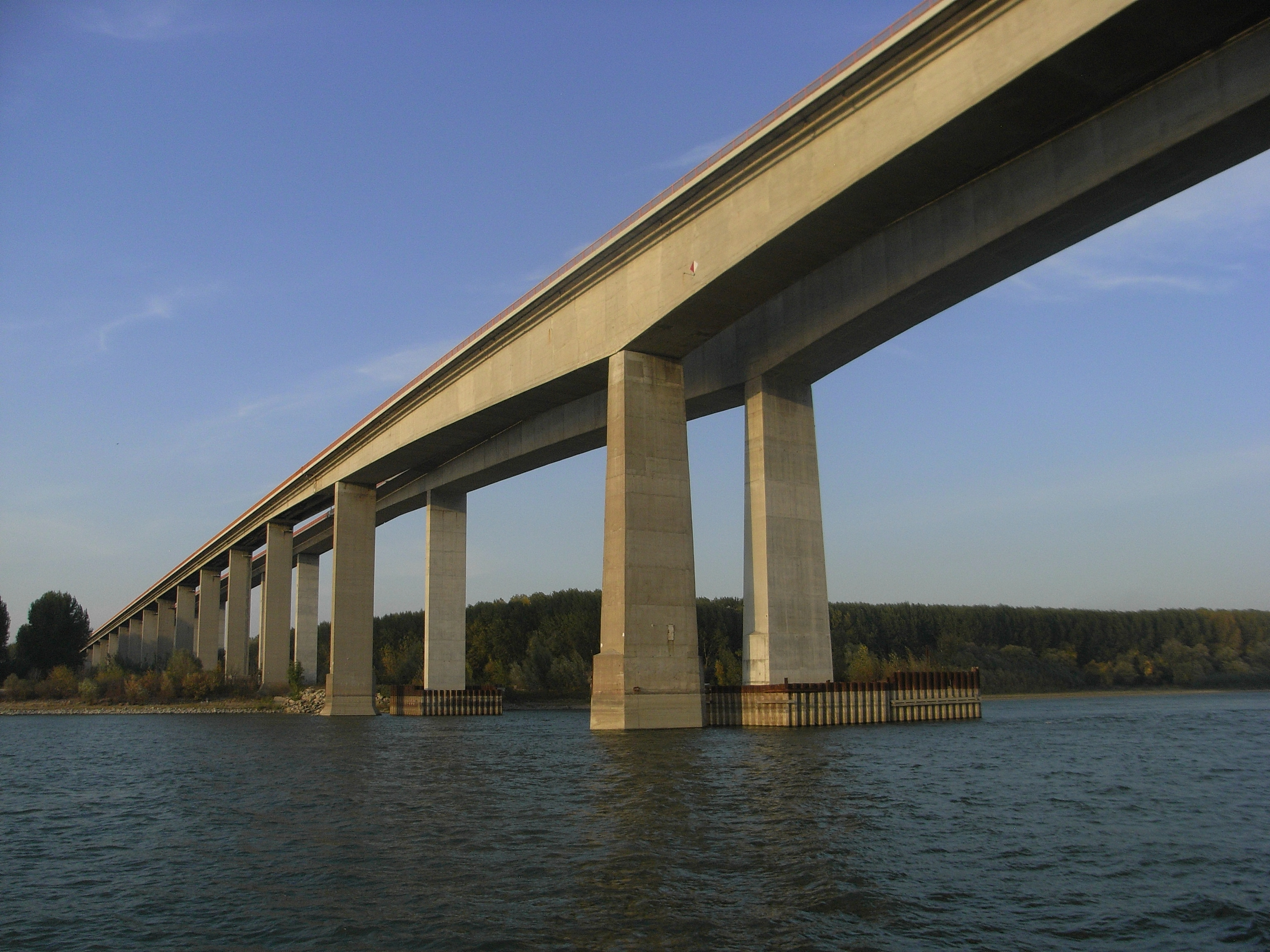
- Beška Bridge, October 2018
- Coordinates: 45°10′11″N 20°4′47″E
- Carried: A1 (E75 in Serbia)
- Crossed: Danube
- Locale: Beška, Serbia
- Preceded by: Žeželj Bridge
- Followed by: Pupin Bridge

Characteristics
- Design: Cantilever bridges
- Total length: 2,205 m
- Width: 14.40 m
- Height: 68.20 m
- Longest span: 210 m
- No. of spans: 42
- Piers in water: 3
- Clearance above: 50 m

History
- Designer: Branko Žeželj
- Construction start: 1971; 55 years ago (Southbound); 2008; 18 years ago (Northbound)
- Construction end: 1975; 51 years ago (Southbound); 3 October 2011; 14 years ago(Northbound)
- Opened: 1975; 51 years ago (Southbound); 19 July 1999; 26 years ago (Southbound reopening); 3 October 2011; 14 years ago(Northbound)
- Collapsed: 21 April 1999; 27 years ago (partially damaged due to NATO bombing)

Statistics
- Daily traffic: 29,566
- Toll: yes

Location
- Interactive map of Beška Bridge; Most kod Beške

Beška Bridge (Serbian: Мост код Бешке, Most kod Beške) crosses the Danube river near Beška, Serbia on the A1 motorway, part of the European route E75. It consists of two identical prestressed concrete constructions, the first being completed in 1975 and the second in 2011. With 2,205 m total length, it is the longest bridge over the Danube.

== Name ==
The bridge does not have an official name, usually referred to as Beška Bridge due to its vicinity to the Beška settlement.

== History ==
The first bridge was designed by architect Branko Žeželj, who also designed Belgrade Fair – Hall 1, Žeželj Bridge and the foundations of the Belgrade Centre railway station. It was built by Mostogradnja from 1971 to 1975. It was bombed twice and partly destroyed during the NATO bombing of Serbia on 1 April and 21 April 1999, but it was temporarily fixed soon after the bombing was over and reopened on 19 July 1999, as it is an important part of the E75.

A twin new bridge for northbound traffic was built right next to the old one between 2008 and 2011, by a consortium led by Austrian group Alpine Bau, and was opened on October 3, 2011. After its opening, the old bridge was closed for reconstruction, to be finally opened for the designated traffic in August 2014. The total contracted value of the works was €33.7 million, and it was financed from an EBRD loan.

The bridge carries a full motorway profile, having two traffic lanes, hard shoulder lane and two pedestrian lanes.

== Gallery ==
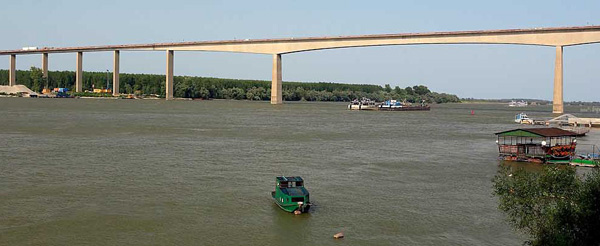
Beška Bridge from the Danube, before northbound construction, August 2008

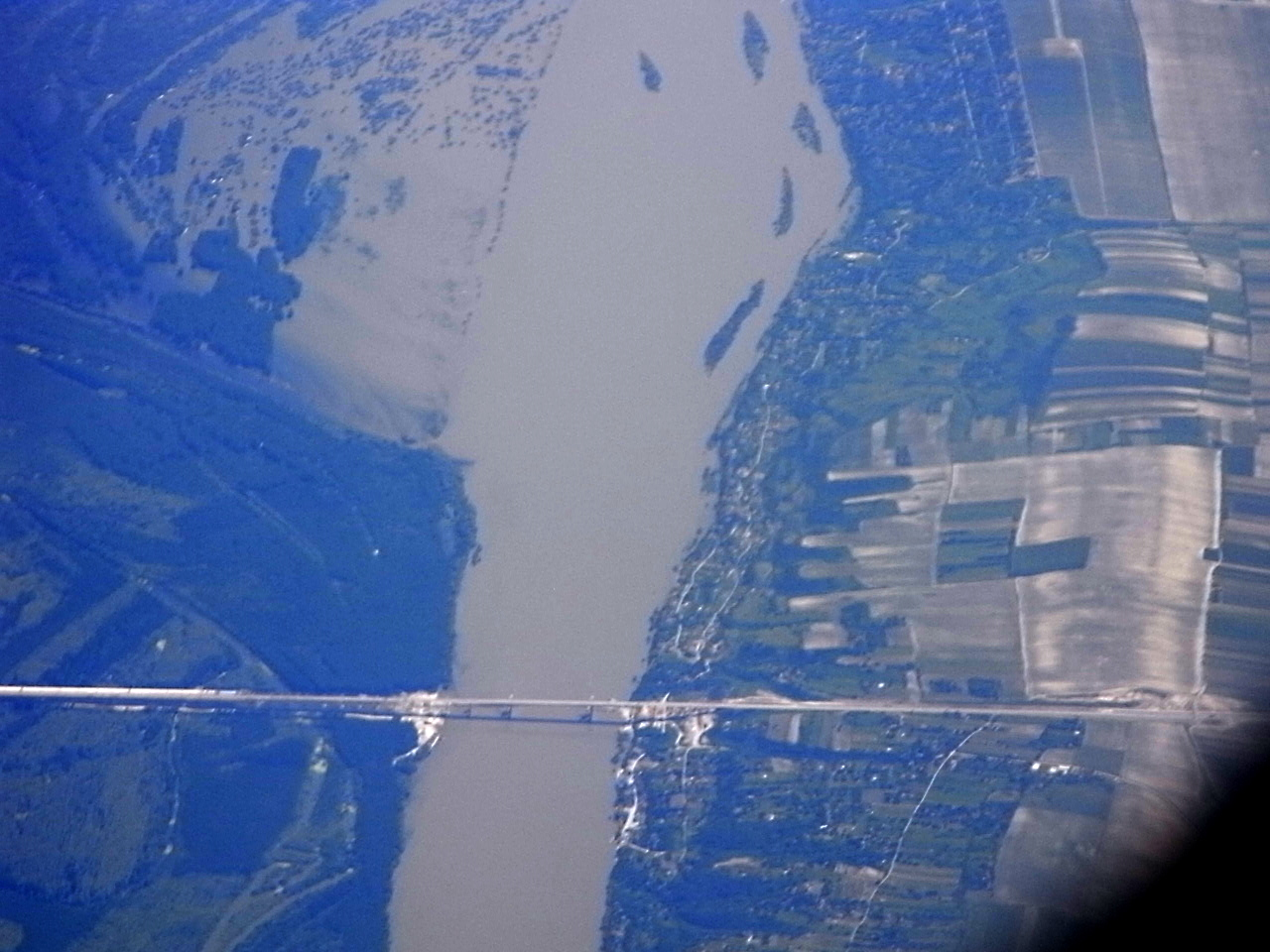
Areal view of the northbound construction, June 2010

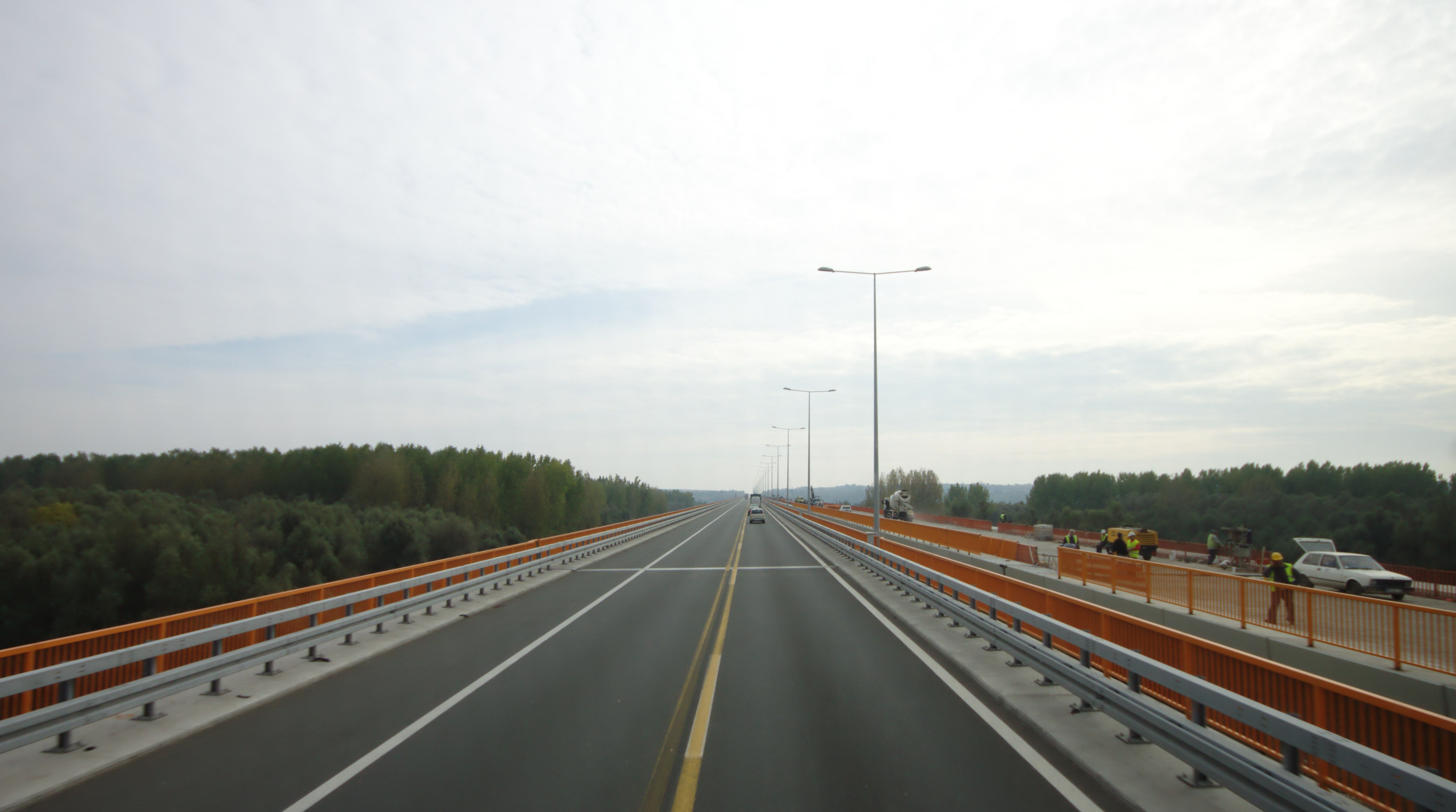
Northbound bridge road, October 2012

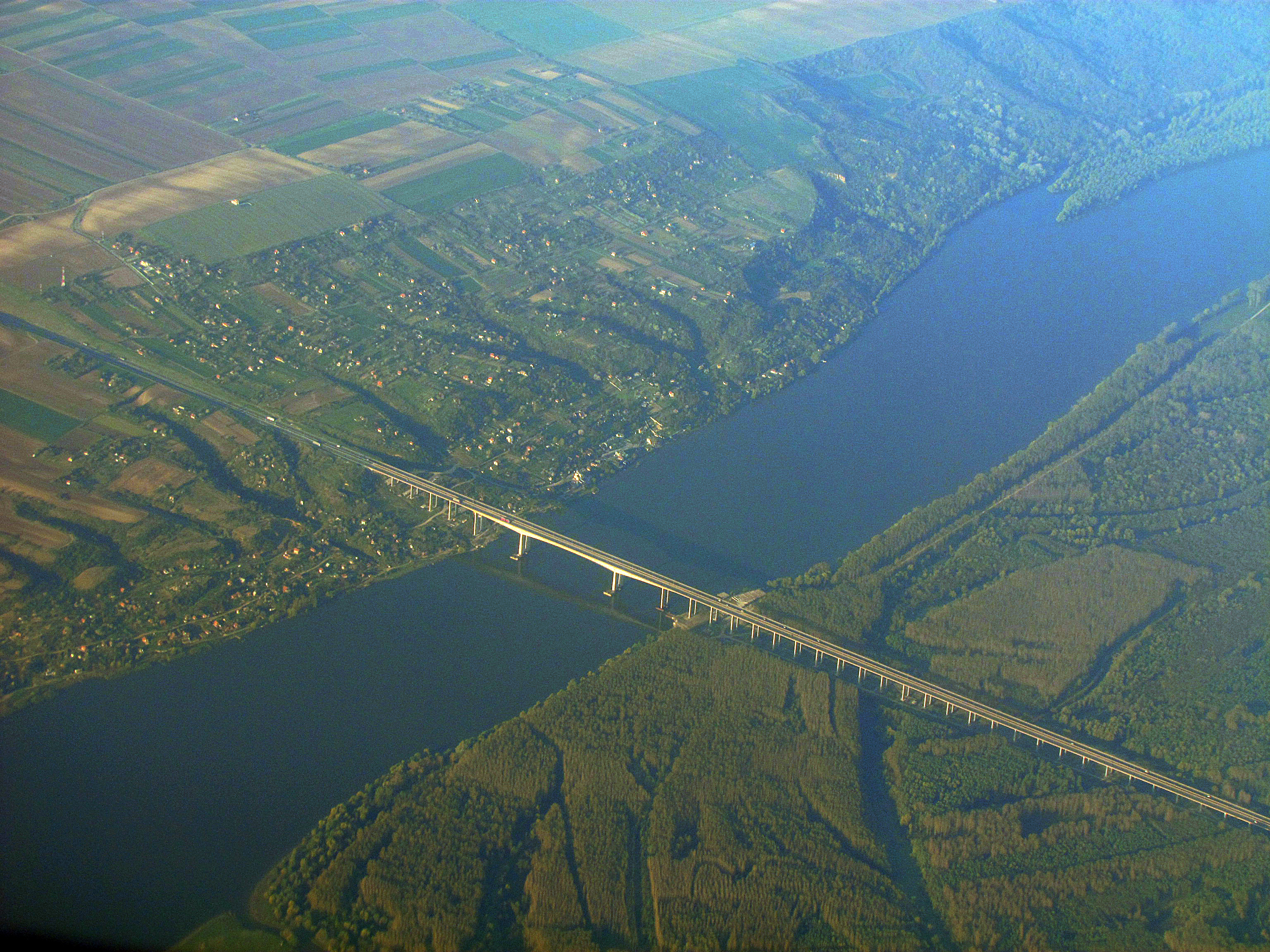
Areal view of Beška Bridge, April 2015

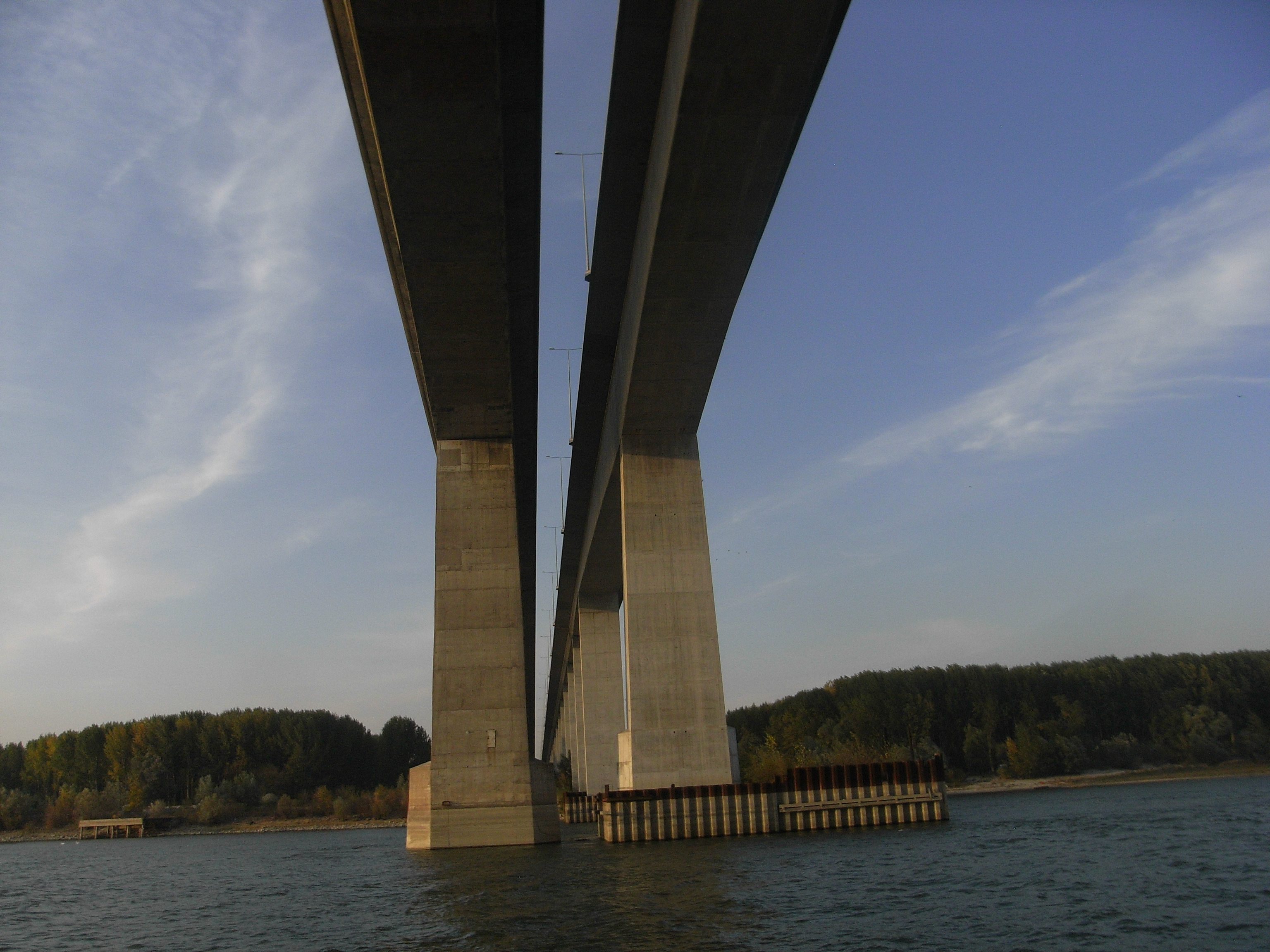
River passing beneath the bridge, October 2018

== See also ==
- List of bridges in Serbia
- List of crossings of the Danube
