= Road–Railway Bridge, Novi Sad =

Bridge in Novi Sad, Vojvodina, Serbia

Road–Railway Bridge Boško Perošević Bridge Друмско-железнички мост Drumsko-železnički most Мост Бошка Перошевића Most Boška Peroševića
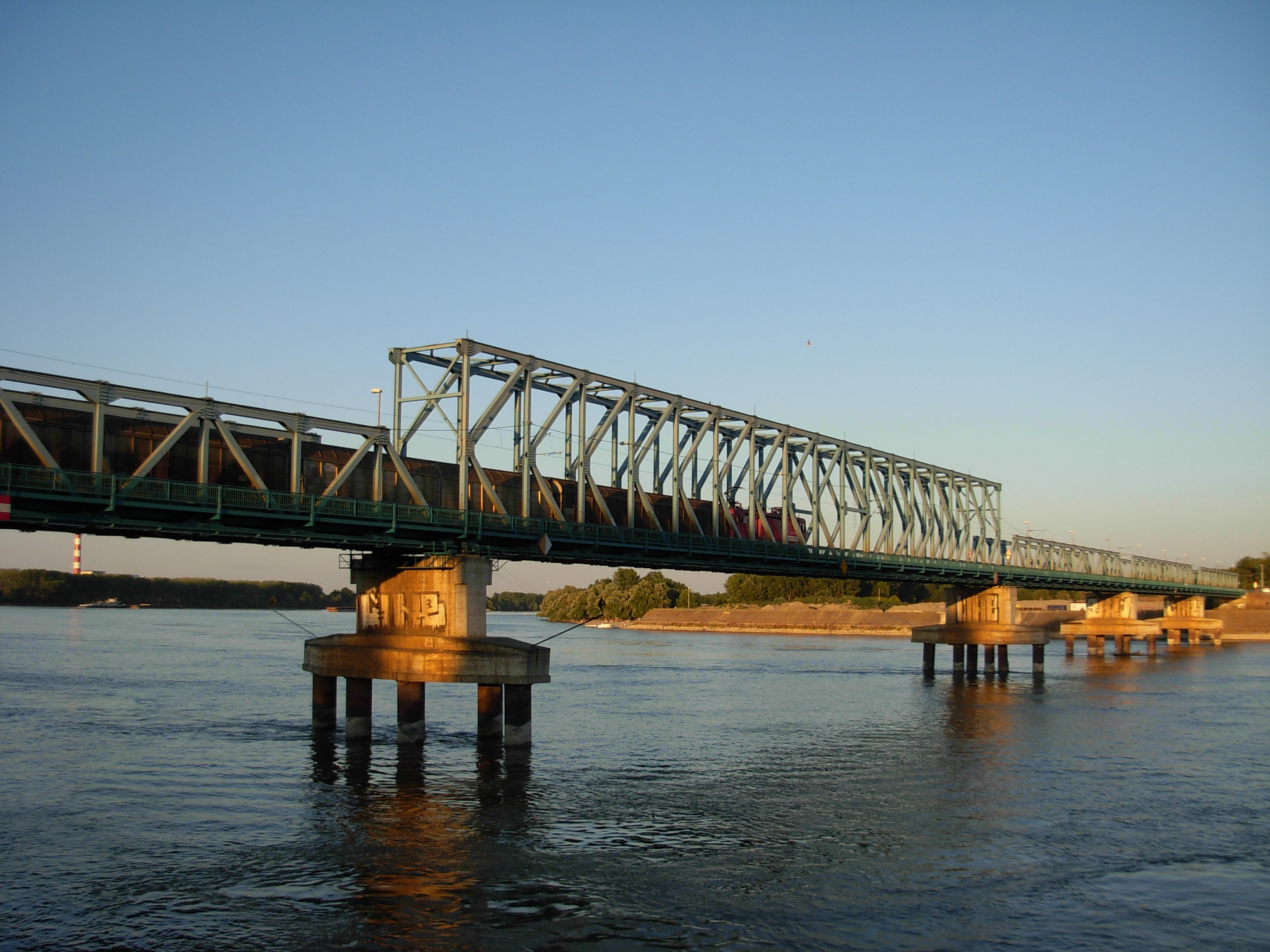
- Road–Railway Bridge in Novi Sad, July 2012
- Coordinates: 45.261480°N 19.859655°E
- Crosses: Danube
- Locale: Novi Sad, Vojvodina, Serbia
- Official name: Boško Perošević Bridge
- Named for: Boško Perošević
- Preceded by: Varadin Bridge
- Followed by: Žeželj Bridge

Characteristics
- Design: Truss bridge
- Material: Steel
- Trough construction: Steel
- Pier construction: Reinforced concrete
- Traversable?: Yes
- Piers in water: 4
- No. of lanes: 1

Rail characteristics
- No. of tracks: 1
- Track gauge: 1,435 mm (4 ft 8 1/2 in)
- Electrified: Yes

History
- Opened: 29 May 2000; 26 years ago
- Closed: 1 September 2018; 8 years ago (Replaced by New Žeželj Bridge)

Location
- Interactive map of Road–Railway Bridge; Boško Perošević Bridge

The Road–Railway Bridge (Serbian: Друмско-железнички мост, romanized: Drumsko-železnički most) or Boško Perošević Bridge (Serbian: Most Boška Peroševića) was a bridge on the Danube river in Novi Sad, Serbia.

== Name ==
On the proposal of Slobodan Milošević, at the time President of Yugoslavia, the bridge was named after assassinated Serbian politician and the Chairman of the Executive Council of Vojvodina Boško Perošević.

== Location ==
The bridge was constructed next to the location of the old Žeželj Bridge, at the end of Venizelosova street from the side of Novi Sad, connecting to Reljkovićeva street at Petrovaradin.

== History ==
On May 29, 2000, one year after the NATO bombing of Yugoslavia and the demolition of all three large bridges over the river Danube in Novi Sad, the Road–Railway Bridge was opened upstream from the Žeželj Bridge.

The bridge was designed to be a temporary one-lane railway and road bridge, after the demolition of the nearby Žeželj Bridge during the 1999 NATO bombing of Yugoslavia.

In October 2018, following the completion of the new Žeželj Bridge, the dismantling of the Boško Perošević Bridge began. By March 2019, the first phase of bridge dismantling was finished.

== Gallery ==
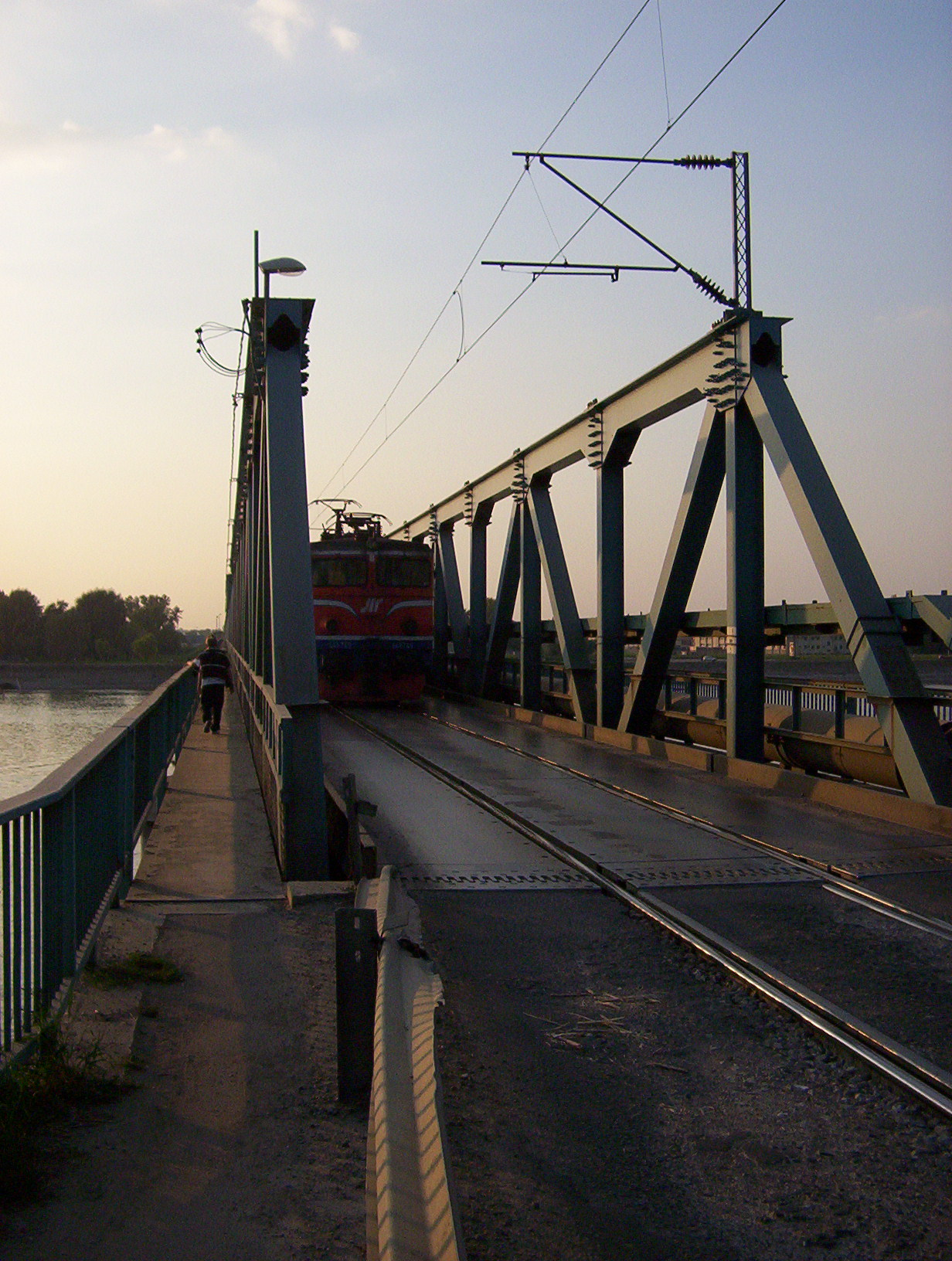
Train on the bridge, September 2006

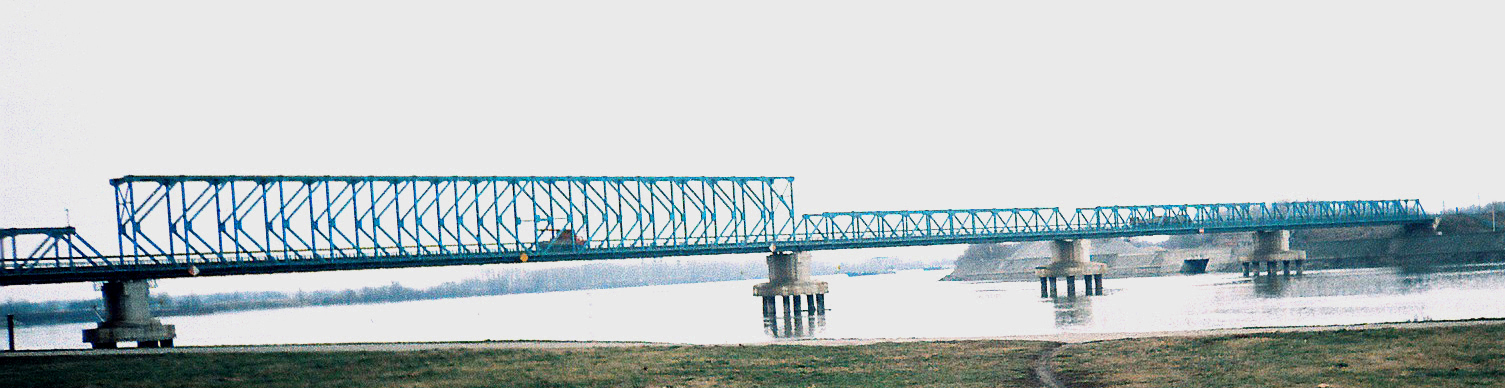
Road–Railway Bridge, April 2009

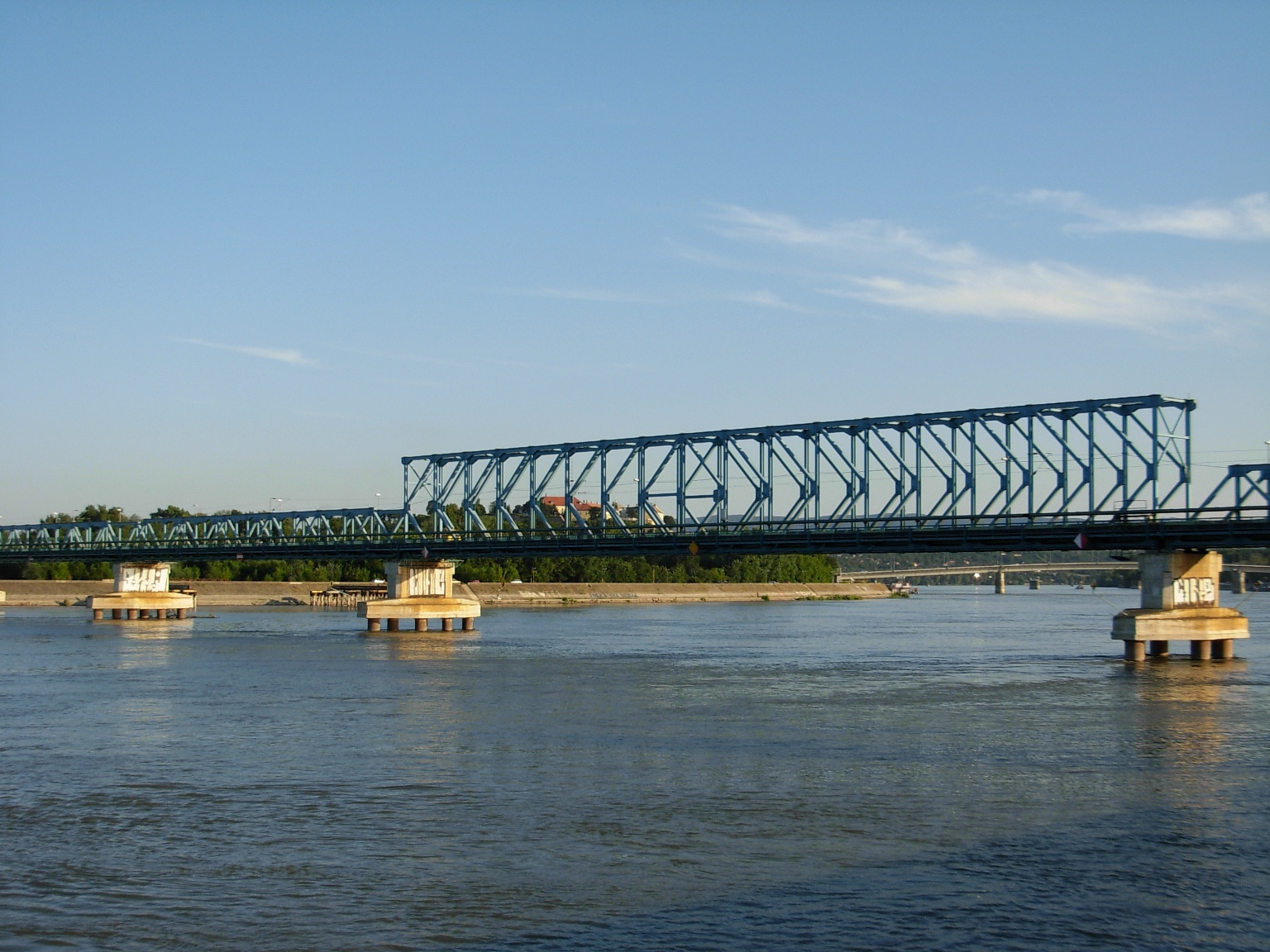
Road–Railway Bridge, August 2010

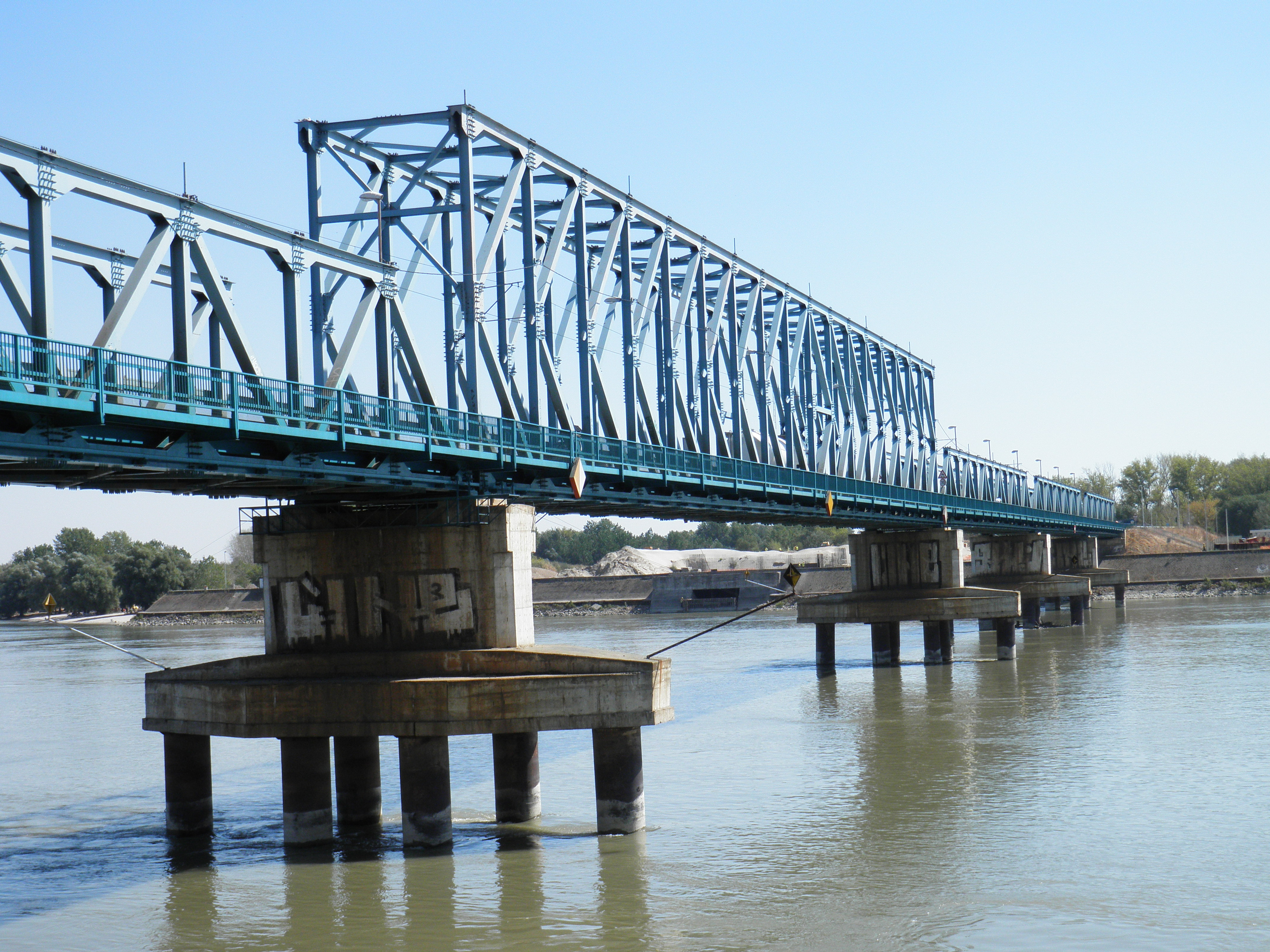
Road–Railway Bridge with water piers, September 2012

== See also ==
- List of bridges in Serbia
- List of crossings of the Danube
- List of road–rail bridges
