= Mostogradnja =

Serbian company that builds bridges

- Official logo
- Native name: Мостоградња
- Company type: Joint-stock company
- Industry: Bridge building
- Founded: 22 January 1999; 27 years ago (Current form); 1947; 79 years ago (Founded)
- Fate: Bankruptcy procedure
- Headquarters: Vlajkovićeva 19a, Belgrade, Serbia
- Area served: Worldwide
- Revenue: ▲€0.62 million (2022)
- Net income: ▲ (€6.69 million) (2022)
- Total assets: ▼€34.27 million (2022)
- Total equity: ▼€0 (2022)
- Owner: RFZO (36.27%); Government of Serbia (29.91%); City of Belgrade (8.52%); Others
- Number of employees: 2 (2022)
- Website: www.mostogradnja.rs

Mostogradnja (Građevinsko preduzeće Mostogradnja a.d. Beograd) is a Serbian bridge building company, with headquarters in Belgrade, Serbia. Its projects have included bridges and interchanges, as well as industrial and military structures in Serbia, former Yugoslavia and abroad. As of August 2021, the company is in bankruptcy procedure.

== History ==
In 1945, a group of engineers, technicians and workers at the Directorate of the Yugoslav Railways was given the task to reconstruct the railway bridge at Pančevo over Tamiš which was destroyed during World War II. In 1946 and 1947, the group was expanded and given additional responsibility to reconstruct the bridges over Tisa at Titel and over Danube at Bogojevo.

In July 1947, the Directorate of Yugoslav Railways established Mostogradnja Railway Civil Engineering Enterprise, to specialize in bridge construction. The headquarters of the company, which were formerly situated at various sites of large projects, were finally moved from Titel to Belgrade in early 1949.

In 1952, Mostogradnja separated from the public railway company and became an independent enterprise. During the 1950s, Mostogradnja was expanded with the addition of the public railways' Enterprise For Repair of Construction Machines at Batajnica in 1955, and Pionir, another bridge construction enterprise from Belgrade in 1959.

In the 1970s and 1980s, Mostogradnja completed a series of major construction projects in Yugoslavia and abroad. The projects at home included the Gazela bridge and Mostar and Autokomanda interchanges, several bridges over Danube, and the bridge connecting the island of Krk to the Croatian mainland, which at the time of construction featured the longest concrete arch in the world. Abroad, the company constructed bridges, hangars, reservoirs, aerials and various industrial and military structures in Europe, Asia and Africa. These included a series of bridges over Tigris and Euphrates in Iraq.

By the early 1980s, Mostogradnja had 5,000 employees and was among world's top 250 construction companies. The decline of Yugoslavia and consequent United Nations trade embargo on Serbia in the 1990s reduced the company's market, but it continued to build domestic projects, including the bridges over Sava at Obrenovac and Ostružnica. The previously socially owned enterprise was privatized and became a joint stock company.

Company's recent projects have included the reconstruction of bridges destroyed by NATO during Kosovo war in 1999, as well as the repairs to numerous bridges across Serbia.

The Government of Serbia tried several times to sell its majority stake in company's ownership, but public auctions failed in 2009 and 2015. In 2018, it was reported that the Government still had plans to sell its ownership share in the company by 2020. In August 2021, Mostogradnja went into bankruptcy procedure. In May 2024, it was reported that the facilities of the bankrupt Mostogradnja are leased way below the market price to "Mostogradnja ing", a subsidiary of the Serbian construction company Millennium Team, which is closely connected to the ruling Serbian Progressive Party.

== Projects ==
- Žeželj bridge, road and railway bridge over Danube in Novi Sad, 1957–1961 (destroyed in 1999)
- Grlo, ("throat"), road bridge over Morača river, 1962–1964
- Road bridge over Euphrates at Fallujah, Iraq, 1964–1967
- Gazela, road bridge over Sava in Belgrade, 1966–1971
- Mala Rijeka Viaduct, tallest railway viaduct in the world, 20 km north of Podgorica, Montenegro, 1969-1973
- Road bridge over Danube on the Smederevo-Kovin road, 1973–1976
- Road bridge over Danube at Bogojevo, 1977–1980
- Road bridge over Shat Al Hillah near Al Hillah, Iraq, 1974–1976
- Road bridge over Euphrates at Mussayib, Iraq, 1974–1976
- Road bridge over Tigris near Numaniyah, Iraq, 1975–1978
- Krk bridge, connecting Croatian mainland to the island of Krk, 1976–1980
- Road bridge over Boljetin on the Kladovo-Golubac road, 1984–1986
- Road bridge over Gazivoda Lake, 1987–1989
- Pedestrian bridge over Sava at Sremska Mitrovica, 1990–1992
- 30 bridges on a section of the Belgrade-Budapest motorway, near Subotica completed 1997
- Road bridge over Sava at Ostružnica, 1990–1998
- Road bridge over Lim in Priboj, 1997–1998
- Road and heating pipeline bridge over Sava at Obrenovac, 1993–1999
