= Žeželj Bridge =

Bridge in Novi Sad, Vojvodina, Serbia

Railway–Road Bridge across the Danube Žeželj Bridge Железничко-друмски мост преко Дунава Železničko-drumski most preko Dunava Жежељев мост Žeželjev most
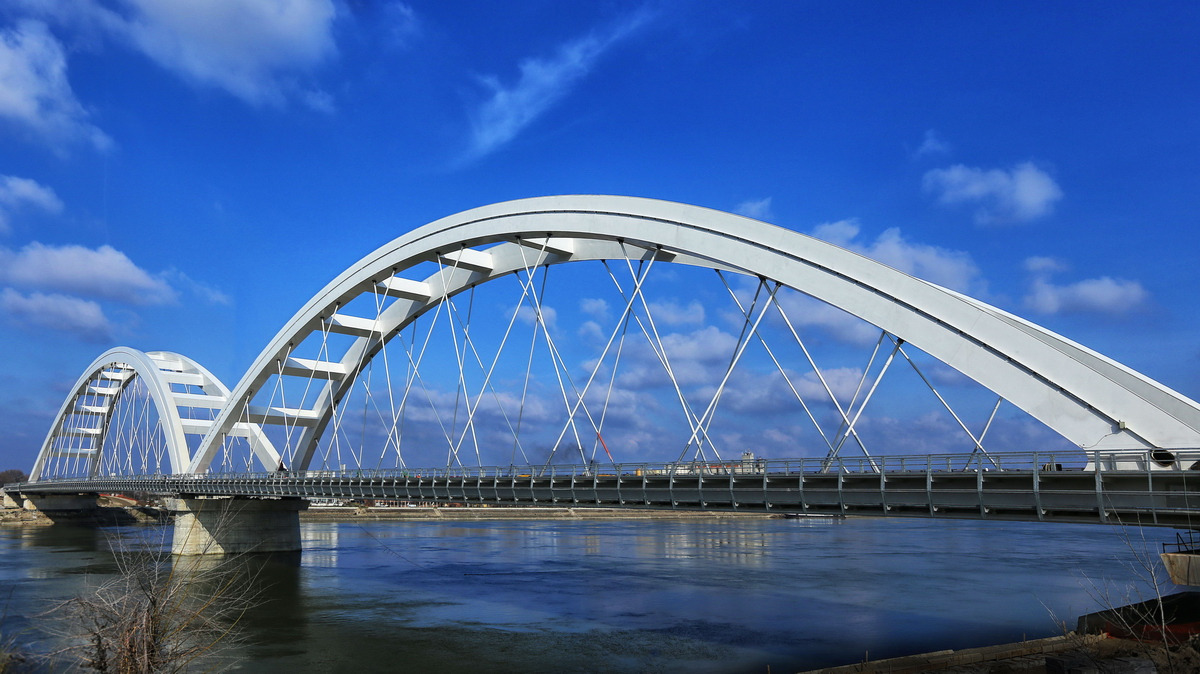
- Žeželj Bridge in Novi Sad, February 2018
- Coordinates: 45°15′43.7″N 19°51′36.9″E
- Crossed: Danube
- Locale: Novi Sad, Vojvodina, Serbia
- Official name: Brotherhood and Unity Bridge (Old bridge); Danube Railway–Road Bridge (New bridge)
- Named for: Branko Žeželj
- Maintained by: Serbian Railways Infrastructure
- Preceded by: Varadin Bridge
- Followed by: Beška Bridge

Characteristics
- Design: Tied-arch bridge
- Material: Steel
- Trough construction: Steel
- Pier construction: Reinforced concrete
- Total length: 474 m
- Width: 32 m
- Height: 42 m
- Traversable?: Yes
- Longest span: 219 m
- No. of spans: 2
- Piers in water: 1
- No. of lanes: 2

Rail characteristics
- No. of tracks: 2
- Track gauge: 1,435 mm (4 ft 8 1/2 in)
- Electrified: Yes

History
- Designer: Branko Žeželj (Old bridge); Aleksandar Bojović (New bridge)
- Construction start: 1957; 68 years ago (Old bridge); 2012; 13 years ago (New bridge)
- Construction end: 1961; 64 years ago (Old bridge); 2018; 7 years ago (New bridge)
- Opened: 1961; 64 years ago (Old bridge); 2018; 7 years ago (New bridge)
- Collapsed: 23 April 1999; 26 years ago (destroyed by NATO bombing)

Žeželj Bridge (Serbian: Жежељев мост, Žeželjev most) is a tied-arch bridge on the Danube river in Novi Sad, Vojvodina, Serbia. The bridge was originally built in 1961, and was destroyed during the 1999 NATO bombing of Yugoslavia. The newly constructed bridge was opened in 2018.

== Name ==
The name Žeželj Bridge came from the bridge's designer and engineer, Branko Žeželj. Officially the old bridge was also named Brotherhood and Unity Bridge (Serbian: Mост братства и јединства, Most bratstva i jedinstva).

The new bridge is officially called Railway–Road Bridge across the Danube (Serbian: Железничко-друмски мост преко Дунава, Železničko-drumski most preko Dunava). However, most citizens refer to it as New Žeželj Bridge, despite it not being designed by Branko Žeželj or from his original bridge plans, only being visually inspired by the old bridge.

== Location ==
Both new and old Žeželj Bridge were constructed at the end of Venizelosova street from the side of Novi Sad, connecting to Reljkovićeva street at Petrovaradin. Boško Perošević Bridge was right next to the new bridge upstream prior to its dismantle.

== History ==
=== Old Žeželj Bridge ===
The original Žeželj Bridge (377 meters long) was a through arch bridge built between 1957 and 1961. It was designed by the prominent Yugoslavian civil engineer Branko Žeželj and constructed by Mostogradnja. It connected the city area of Novi Sad and Petrovaradin. During its existence, it served as part of an international railway line and as a transit road through Novi Sad.

During the NATO bombing of Yugoslavia, the bridge was bombed 12 times. On 23 April 1999, it was finally destroyed, cutting railway transport between Belgrade and Subotica, i.e. Serbia and Hungary. During the NATO bombing, all three large bridges on Danube river in Novi Sad (Žeželj Bridge, Varadin Bridge and Liberty Bridge) were completely destroyed.

=== New Žeželj Bridge ===
In 2000, a temporary Road–Railway Bridge was constructed near the Žeželj Bridge to serve as a replacement of Žeželj Bridge until the new one was constructed. Over the years, the construction of the new Žeželj Bridge was postponed several times.

In April 2012, the construction works for the new bridge in the same place officially started. The main designer of the new bridge was Aleksandar Bojović, while the contractor was an international consortium, JV Azvi - Taddei – Horta Coslada. The new bridge is visually similar to the destroyed bridge, except that the arches are made from steel and not prestressed concrete. The bridge consists of two arches, the larger one being 219 metres (719 ft) long and 42 metres (138 ft) high and the smaller one 177 metres (581 ft) long and 34 metres (112 ft) high.

In October 2017, the arches of Žeželj Bridge were connected after five years of construction and eighteen years after the previous bridge was destroyed. As of October 2017, the construction works cost was 51.71 million euros. In April 2018, the bridge was completed and regular rail transport established. The vehicle transit was established on 1 September 2018.

== Gallery ==
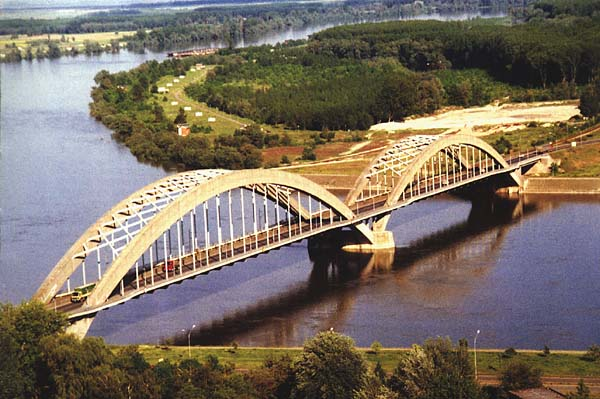
Old Žeželj Bridge, 1960s

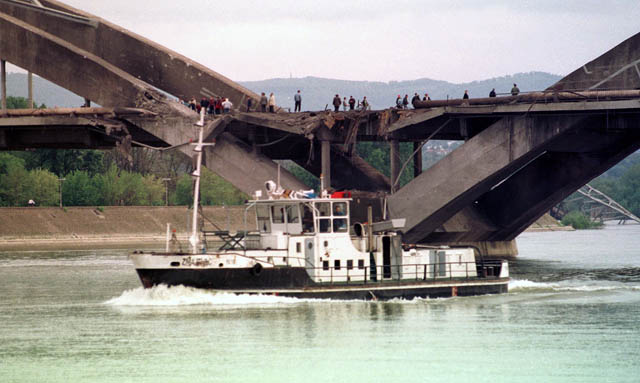
Old Žeželj Bridge damaged in 1999 (before total destruction several days later)

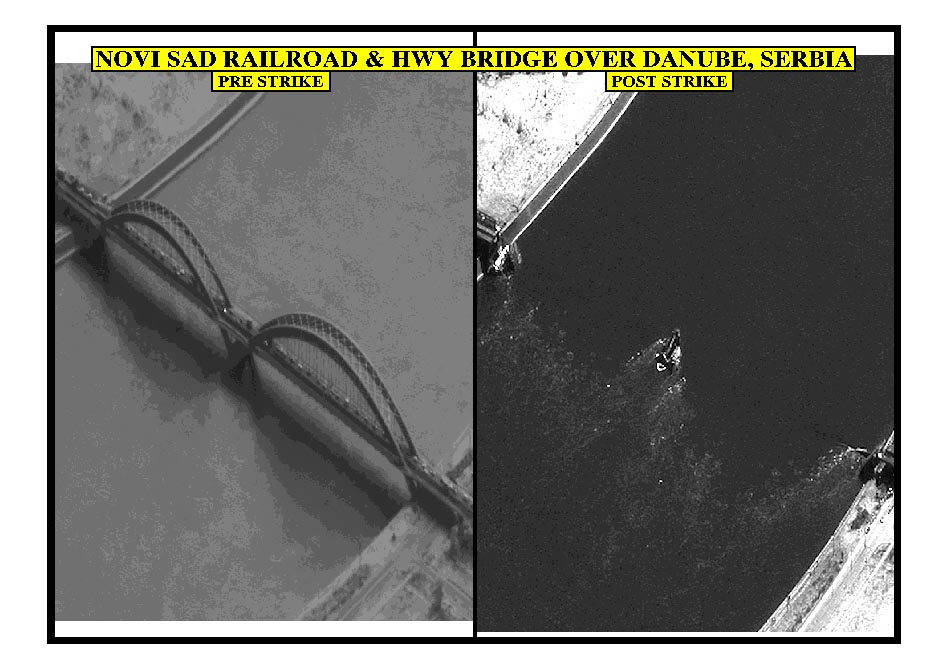
Old Bridge before and after destruction, 1999

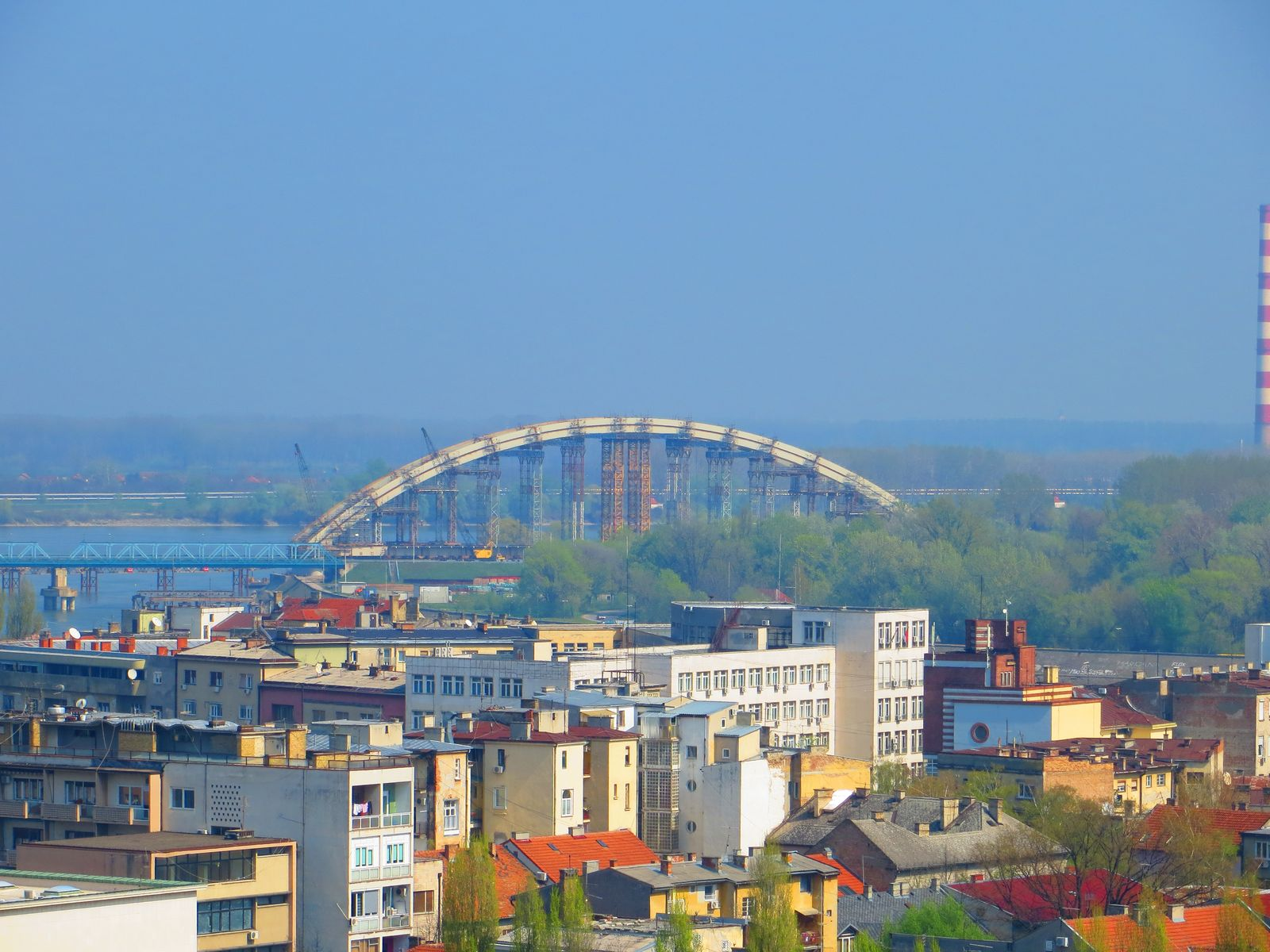
Construction of the New Žeželj Bridge 2012–2017

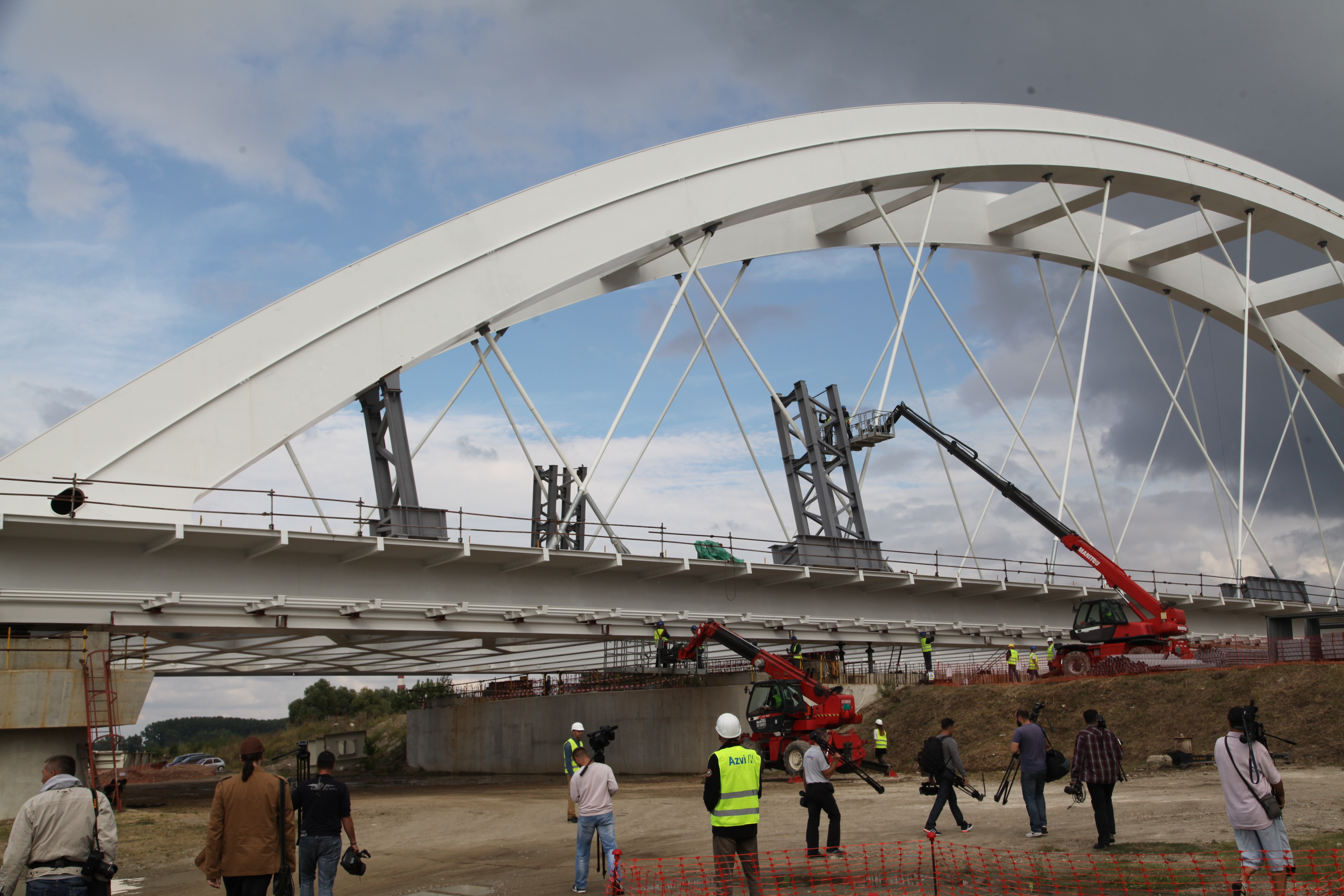
Construction of the New Žeželj Bridge in 2016

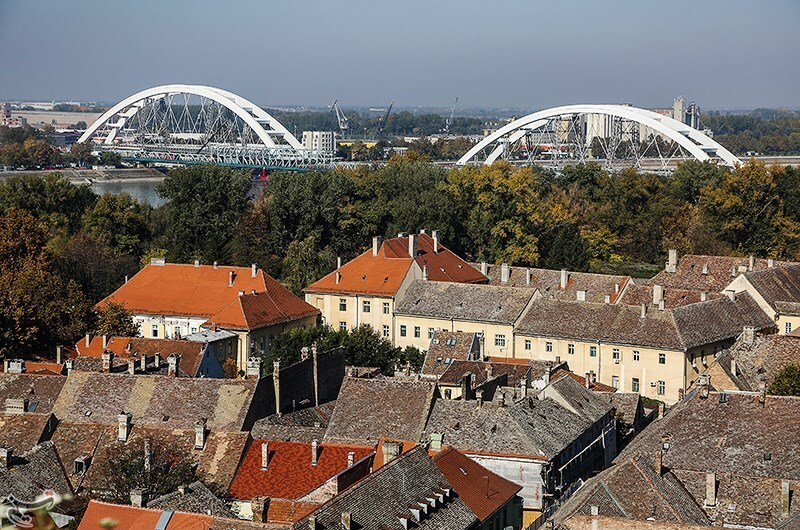
Construction of the New Žeželj Bridge 2012–2017

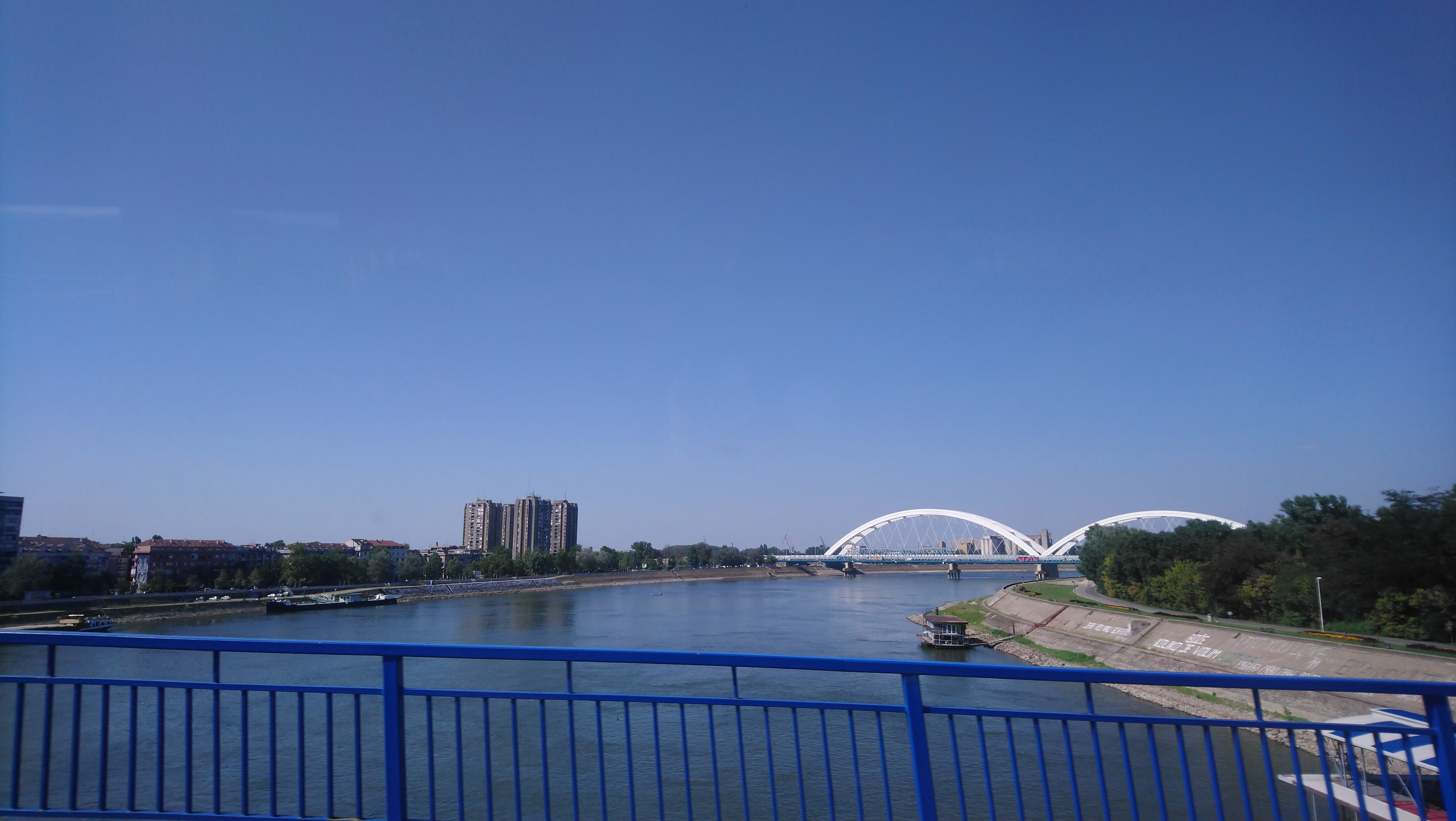
New Žeželj Bridge from Varadin Bridge, August 2018

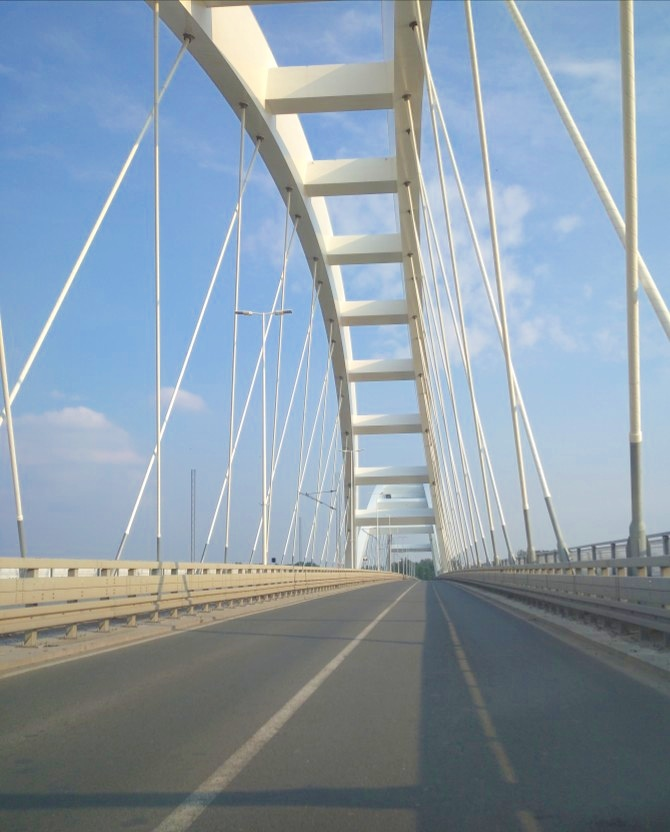
New Žeželj Bridge arch, October 2020

== See also ==
- List of bridges in Serbia
- List of crossings of the Danube
- List of road–rail bridges
