= Pan-European Corridor VII =

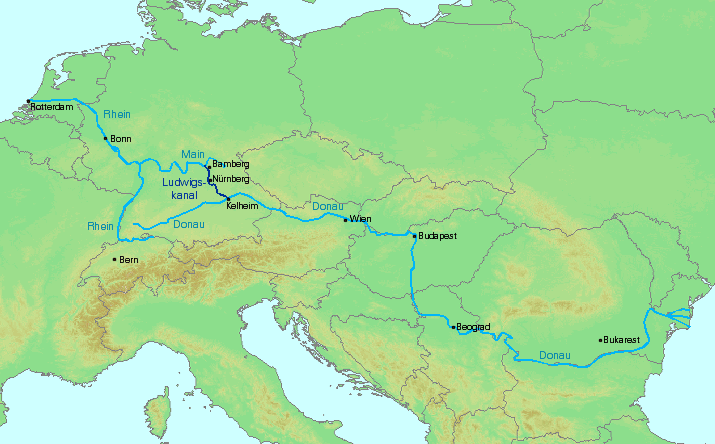
Corridor VII connects Rotterdam to the Black Sea via the Rhine and Danube rivers

Pan-European Corridor VII in theory connects Rotterdam to the Black Sea via the Rhine river, the Main river and the Danube river across the European Watershed, which is spanned by the Rhine–Main–Danube Canal from Bamberg to Kelheim. The canal, which was completed in 1992, is ice-free for approximately 11 months of the year.

In practice, the economic aspects are over-balanced with the ecological, as represented in the Natura 2000 programme.

The corridor measures 2415 km from stem to stern. As of 2014, the EU wanted to maintain a minimum depth of 2.5m all year long.
