= Novi Sad railway station =

Railway station in Novi Sad, Serbia

Novi Sad Нови Сад
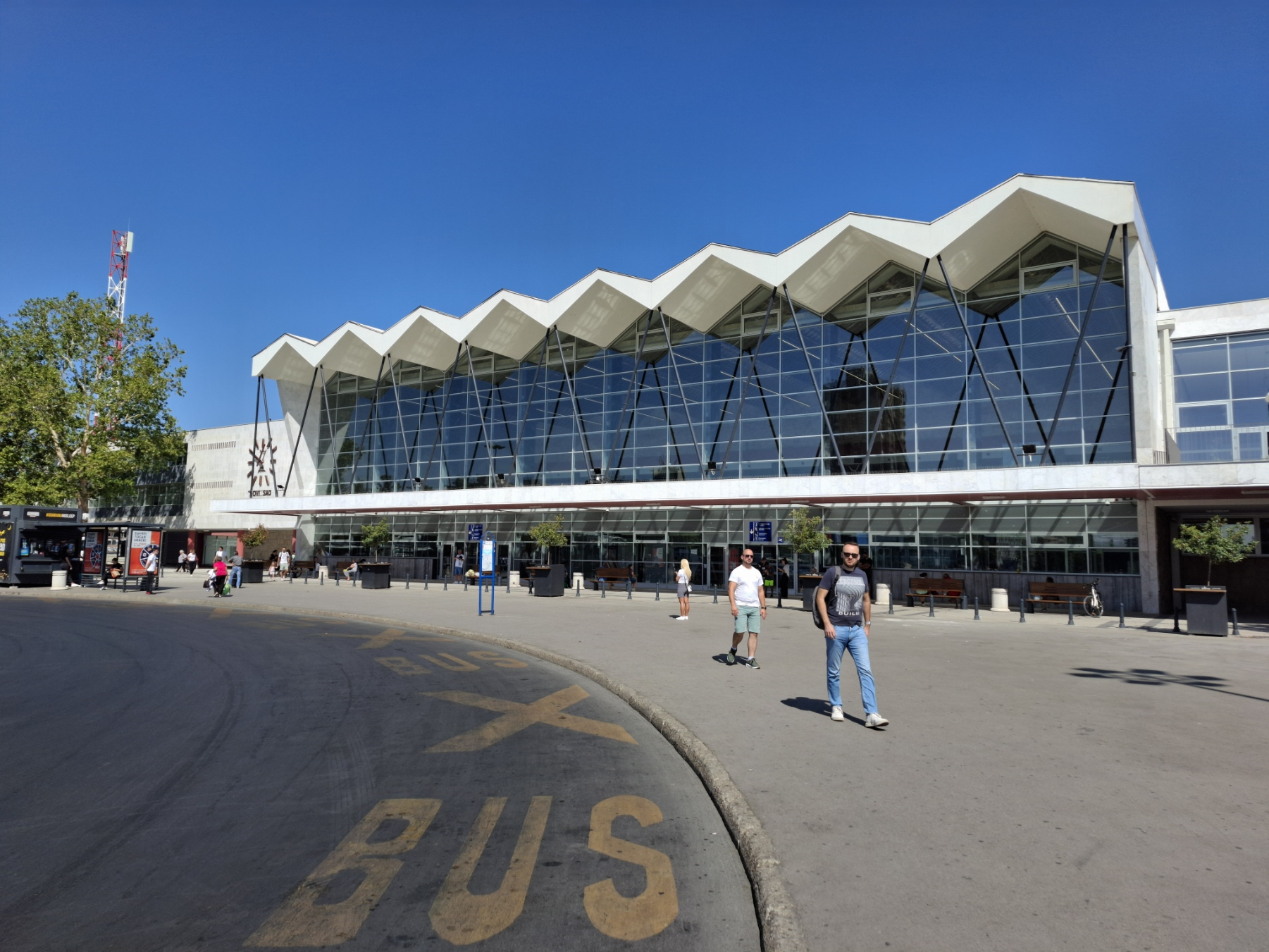
- View of Novi Sad railway station main entrance in August 2024, before the canopy collapse

General information
- Location: Bulevar Jaše Tomića 4 Novi Sad; Serbia
- Coordinates: 45°15′56″N 19°49′46″E
- Operator: Serbian Railways Infrastructure
- Platforms: 13 operational (14 planned)
- Tracks: 3 passenger (5 planned); 4 terminal 7 total (9 planned)
- Train operators: Srbija Voz
- Connections: Bus lines: 3А, 4, 5N, 7А, 7B, 10, 11А, 11B, 14, 15, 16, 17, 20, 21, 22, 23, 24, 25, 30, 31, 32, 33, 35, 41, 42, 43, 51А, 51B, 52, 53, 54, 55, 56, 60, 61, 62, 63, 64, 68, 69, 71, 72, 73, 74, 76, 77, 78, 79A, 79B, 80, 81, 84, 86

Construction
- Structure type: Elevated
- Parking: Yes
- Cycle facilities: Yes
- Accessible: Yes
- Architect: Imre Farkaš, Milan Matović
- Architectural style: Modernist

History
- Opened: 31 May 1964; 62 years ago (initial opening); 19 March 2022; 4 years ago (first large renovation); 5 July 2024; 2 years ago (second large renovation)
- Closed: 4 September 2021; 4 years ago (first large renovation); 7 April 2022; 4 years ago (second large renovation; partially closed); 1 November 2024; 21 months ago (collapsed canopy)
Location

Novi Sad railway station (Serbian: Железничка станица Нови Сад, Železnička stanica Novi Sad) is the main railroad station in Novi Sad, Serbia. The current station, located at Jaše Tomića Boulevard, was opened in 1964, after closing the old railway station from 1883 previously located at what is today the Liman fresh market. The station serves several high-speed trains to Belgrade per day and is part of the Budapest–Belgrade railway project.

== Location ==
Connected on the local railway main line 4, the station is located in the traffic center of the city, at the very beginning of Liberation Boulevard, which forms the traffic backbone of the city in a north–south direction and via the Liberty Bridge leads to the Srem side of the city. In the east–west direction is the Jaša Tomić Boulevard, which leads to the eastern, northern, and western parts of the city via Kisačka and Rumenačka streets. Just 50 m from the railway platforms is a large station plateau used as a turning point for most local bus lines of JGSP Novi Sad, as well as the inbound and outgoing platforms of the international bus station Novi Sad (MAS).

The railway station consists of four units, each specialized for specific functions: the administrative section of the building, which includes a courtyard and certain passenger facilities (A); the central station hall, featuring ticket offices and waiting rooms, defined by the roof structure (B); a block of catering facilities with accompanying infrastructure (C); and storage space for breakbulk cargo, connected to the platform by ramps (D).

== History ==
=== Old railway station ===
The original building of the Novi Sad railway station was located on the site of today's Liman fresh market and Cara Lazara Boulevard and was built in 1882 in the eclectic architectural style common for small railway stations throughout Austria-Hungary. The building consisted of a central hall with cashiers and a waiting rooms for passengers, as well as offices and a restaurant. Next to the main building were storerooms, a customs building and a building for postal service. The first train arrived from Subotica on 5 March 1883. On that day, around 18:30, three trains arrived, the first carrying railway officials to individual stations, the second consisting of three locomotives and used for bridge trials, while the third was driven by the director of the Hungarian state railways L. Tolnay and the Chief of the Construction Inspectorate, Minister Advisor L. Nadia.

The first railway line with Zemun, length of 74.4 km, was put into service on 10 December 1883. The connection to Belgrade via the Sava Bridge was established a year later, connecting it with the 234.4 km long Belgrade–Niš railway line. The railway station would also connect Novi Sad with Budapest, Vienna, Niš and Istanbul. The famous Orient Express, travelling from Paris to Istanbul, initially went through Banat region through Kikinda and would later have a route through Budapest and Novi Sad, travelling across the Emperor Franz Joseph Bridge (later the Varadin Bridge and Žeželj Bridge).

Many famous people at the time used the railway station and its services, such as the members of the Dunđerski family, Laza Kostić, Jovan Jovanović Zmaj, Svetozar Miletić, Isidora Sekulić and Agatha Christie.

On Tucindan on 4 January 1890, Jaša Tomić had killed Miša Dimitrijević amidst a crowded railway station. This event would be known as the Tucindan tragedy.

Since 1901, an omnibus has been used to transport passengers from the railway station to the center of the city. The electric tram was introduced on 30 September 1911. The tram line lasted until 1958 when all tram traffic in the city was shut down with the introduction of bus services.

A train yard was built in 1921 from the alleged designs of the Gustave Eiffel bureau at the outskirts of the city that would later become the Bistrica neighborhood.

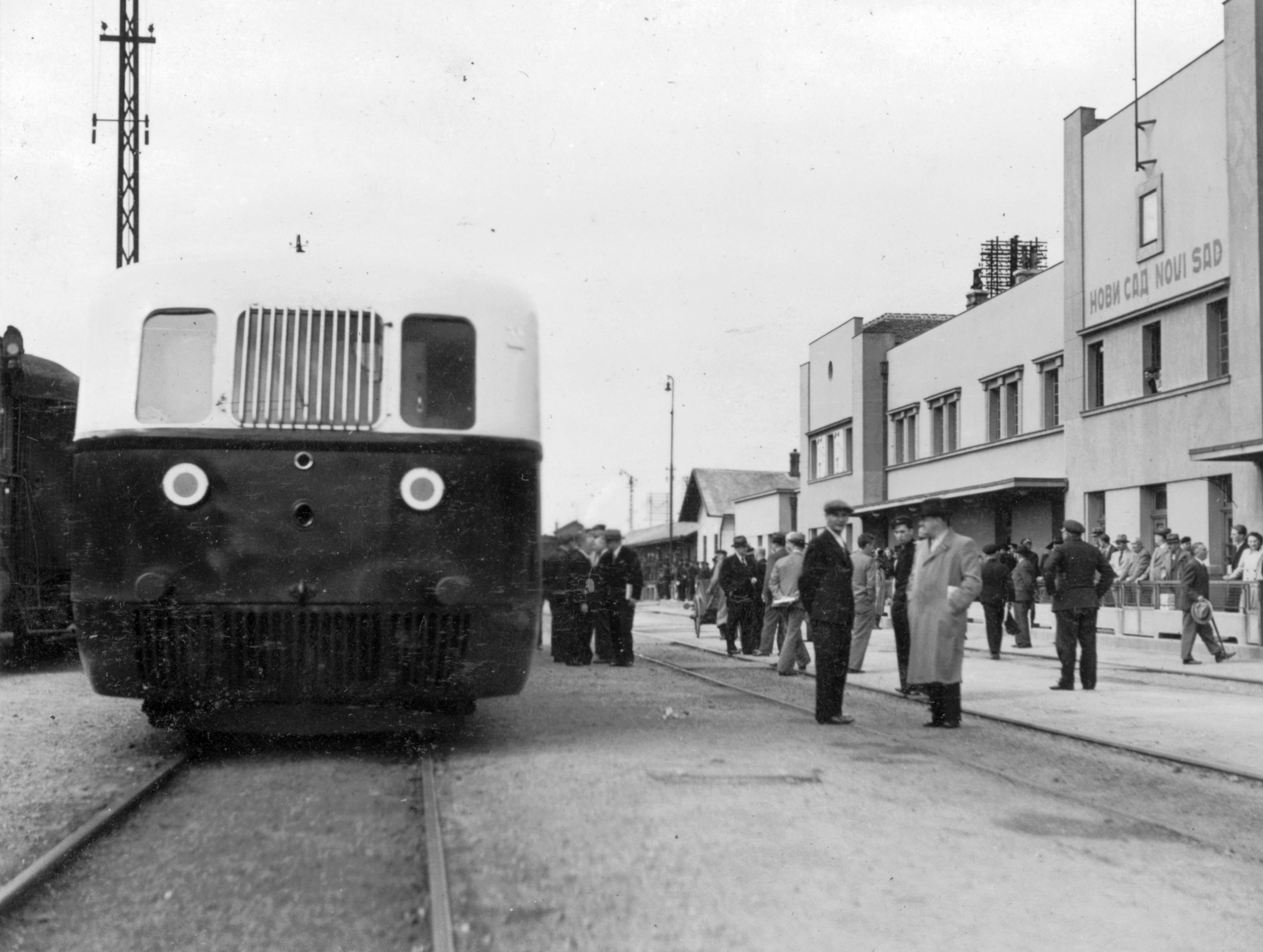
A Ganz Árpád railcar at the renovated old station in 1937

Due to increased demand, the old railway station was renovated and expanded in 1931, incorporating a modernist architectural design popular at the time. The building features stone reliefs depicting athletes in a race, carrying a railway wheel with wings.

During the Second World War, the station was the site of a massacre of innocent civilians trying to flee the city in April 1941 after the Hungarian occupation of Yugoslav territories, a precursor to the Novi Sad raid. The station was bombed by ally bombers in September 1944. It was quickly rebuilt and put into service after the liberation of the city on 23 October 1944, with tram services restarted on 25 May 1945.

Due to the expansion of the city and the change of railway connections, the old railway station lost its importance by the 1960s. The main railway station for the city was planned to move north at the end of the future 23 October Boulevard (later known as Liberation Boulevard). The shutdown of the old railway station began in May 1961. The last train over the Marshal Tito Bridge (predecessor to the new Varadin Bridge) crossed in 1962, after which the railway was dismantled from the bridge, as well as the Štrosmajerova street and within Petrovaradin. On the last train car a poster was placed that had "Jel Vam žao što se rastajemo?" (Are you sorry that we're departing?) written on it. With the opening of the new railway station, the old one closed after over 80 years of service.

Between 1968 and 1970, the old railway station was dismantled, with modern boulevards built on its old railway routes. On the route from the Marshal Tito Bridge towards the new Liman neighborhood, Maksima Gorkog street and Cara Lazara Boulevard were built. On the old railway lines for Sombor and Subotica, two boulevards were built, the Patrijarha Pavla Boulevard (previously Somborski Boulevard) and Europe Boulevard (previously Subotički Boulevard). Remnants of the old train yard was used by freight trains until 2021, when the last railway rails were dismantled and removed following the opening of the new park. There are currently plans to restore the old train yard and use it as part of a larger central park complex connected with the newly made park via a pedestrian bridge.

In 2003, to mark the 120th anniversary of railway traffic in Novi Sad, a memorial marking was placed at the site of the former railway station. The stone relief once stood on the façade of the old railway building above the exit to platform 2. It is currently located at the east end of the Liman fresh market, within the open backyard for the post office in Vojvođanska street.

=== Current railway station ===
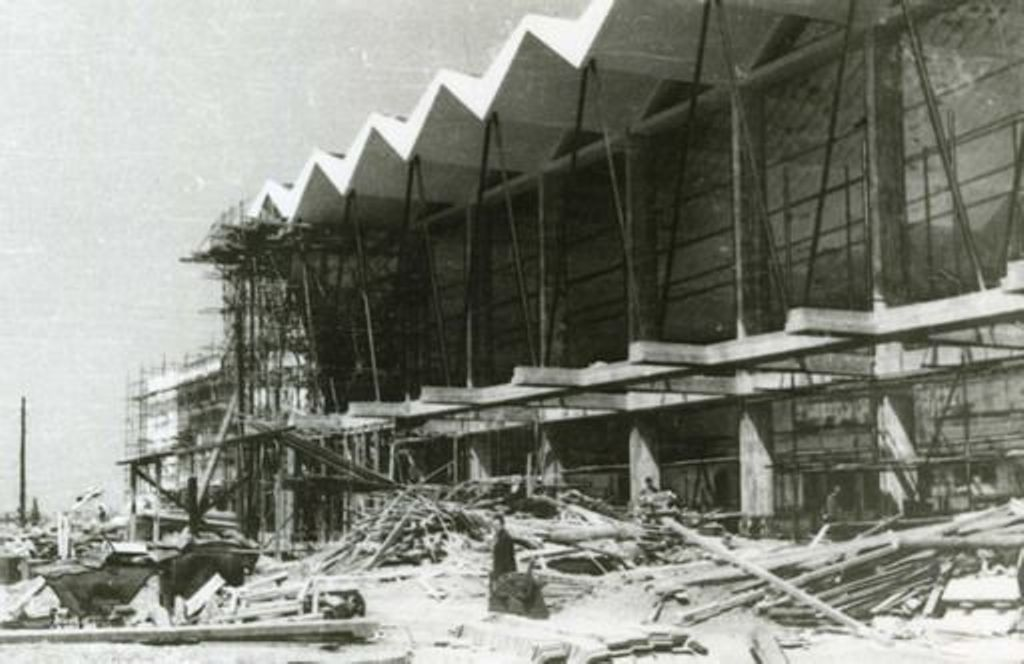
Construction of the current station ca. 1964, reinforced concrete structure of the canopy to collapse in 2024 is visible

In 1960, the City Council of Novi Sad announced a public call for the passenger railway and bus station design. The prerequisite for the new stations construction was the construction of the old Žeželj Bridge between 1957 and 1961, designed by Branko Žeželj and constructed by Mostogradnja. Since none of the 4 proposals submitted met the requirements, the architectural studio "Arhitekt" from Novi Sad was awarded the task. Imre Farkaš has been appointed chief designer, aided by Milan Matović. The modern railway station was designed in a dashing, creative atmosphere, integrating the open call requirements with expert suggestions for modernizing the railway. The construction began on 1 March 1963 by the Novi Sad "Neimar" construction company, along with "Novomont", "Metal", "Polet" companies. The "Alba" company was responsible for adding all the glass to the building within 28 hours of non-stop work. The station was built in record time of 18 months over 8000 square meters, using simple construction techniques, and the costs were much lower than expected. The facility was completed ahead of schedule.

The building is characterized by a sawtooth roof, a symbol of typical roofs found in Vojvodina houses (or Pannonian houses). Interior of the station uses 17 types of stone used to cover the walls and floors of the station, all from different parts of Yugoslavia. Ljubiša Petrović was responsible for the grandiose composition "Zora u ravnici Vojvodine" (Dawn in the Vojvodina Plain), constructed with a ceramoplastic technique. Nikola Popržana made a copper coat of arms of Novi Sad that was placed on the railway platform side of the building. At the time it was hailed as a masterpiece of modern architecture.

The station was ceremoniously opened on 31 May 1964 by Stevan Doronjski-Franja, vice president of the executive board of Socialist Republic of Serbia The first train left for Belgrade at 10:32 in the morning, while the second train left at 11 o′clock for the north of the country towards Subotica. Despite the main building being opened for public use, areas such as the eastern wing used for storage space for breakbulk cargo would not be fully completed until the 1970s.

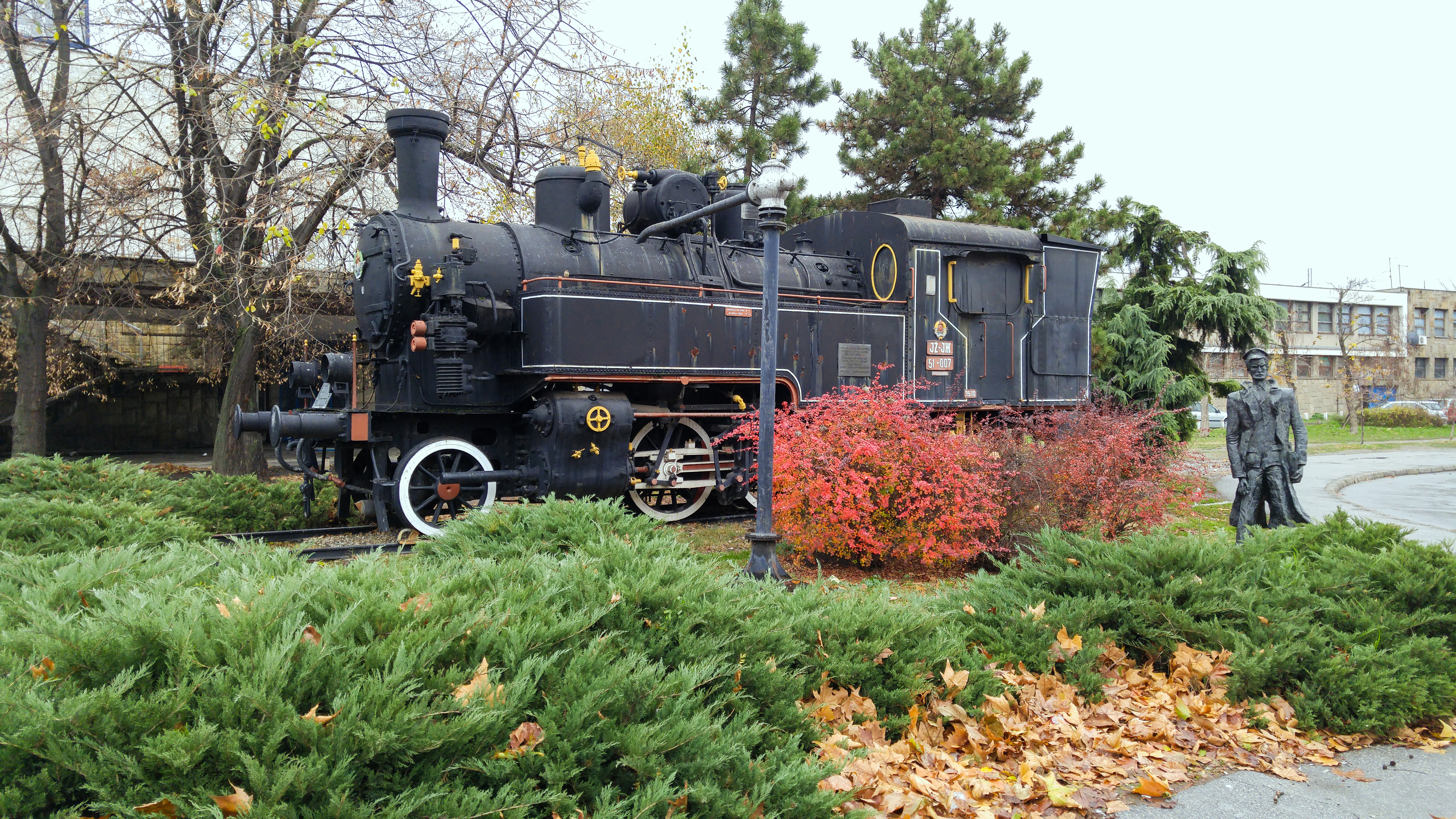
A general view of the 1988 memorial locomotive and the 1989 statue

On 15 April 1988, to mark the 105th anniversary of railway traffic in Novi Sad, the JŽ 51-007 (or MÁV 375.956) steam locomotive was placed at the entrance of the station, as part of the Technical collection of the Railway Museum of Serbian Railways. Since then, it was a popular gathering place for people arriving or departing from Novi Sad via train, bus or car. The locomotive was built in 1925 in Budapest. There were 624 locomotives built in this series, with the last one, MÁV 375.1032, built in 1959 and subsequently the last steam locomotive produced in Hungary. They were common locomotives used in the Hungarian part of Austria-Hungary in the period of 1910–1924. After World War II, there were 166 locomotives in service, built in the periods of 1907–1918, 1920–1926 and 1942. On the territory of modern Vojvodina, there are 58 locomotives of this series in train yards or on display in Novi Sad, Subotica, Sombor, Kikinda, Vršac, Zrenjanin, Pančevo and Inđija. The JŽ 51-007 locomotive was used for the opening shots of the Italian film Andremo in città in 1966.

In 1989, a bronze statue of a railway worker was placed next to the old displayed locomotive. Sculpted by Radovan Moljski, it depicts a railway worker in a standard uniform used in the period from 1945 to 1985.

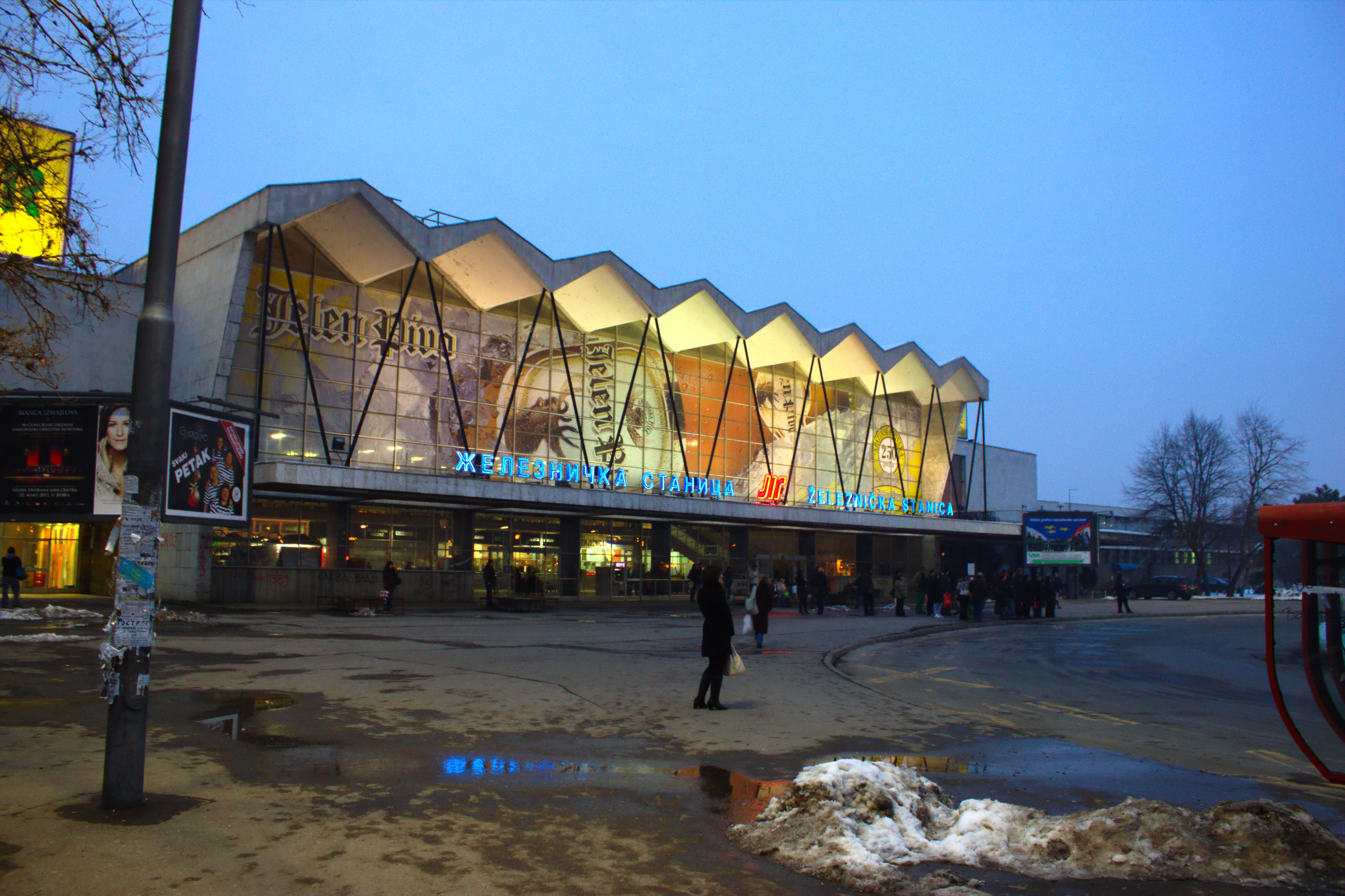
Current station facade unevenly lit in the evening, 2011

The railway building was left to disrepair during the political and economic instabilities of the 1990s and 2000s. The restaurant and the waiting rooms stopped being used, while the cleanliness was at a low level. The clock on the station building was broken for years.

Railway traffic was disrupted during the NATO bombing of Novi Sad in 1999. The old Žeželj Bridge was bombed twice, 22 and 26 April, with the latter resulting in the destruction of the bridge. Railway traffic across the Danube was halted until 29 May 2000, when the temporary Boško Perošević Bridge was built.

==== Railway station reconstruction ====
In 2021, plans for renovating and expanding the station were revealed as part of a nationwide railway revitalization and modernization effort by the government of Serbia to introduce high-speed railway traffic in the country. The plan included the reconstruction of the tracks 1, 2, 3, 10 and 11, construction of a new platform and the complete renovation of the main building with additional lifts for disabled people. Reconstruction of the railway station began on 4 September 2021. The prerequisite for the renovation of the station was the dismantling of the Boško Perošević Bridge and building of the Railway–Road Bridge across the Danube, designed by Aleksandar Bojović and constructed by JV Azvi – Taddei – Horta Coslada international consortium between 2012 and 2018. The railway station reconstruction was done by China Railway International Co., Ltd (a subsidiary of China Railway Group Limited) and China Communications Construction Company, Ltd. (together: CRIC-CCCC) as part of the Budapest–Belgrade railway project, the first stage of the planned Budapest–Belgrade–Skopje–Athens railway international connection. On 7 March 2022, JKP "Stan" restored the JŽ 51-007 locomotive, as well as installing additional display lights around it.

The 75 km railway for speed up to 200 km/h between Belgrade and Novi Sad, along with a reconstructed railways station building was opened on 19 March 2022 (this part was divided in two sections: as of 2018, the Belgrade–Stara Pazova 34.5 km section was planned to be finished in the end of 2020 and the Stara Pazova–Novi Sad 40.4 km section in November 2021). The station's ceremonious re-opening was attended by Serbian president Aleksandar Vučić, Serbian prime minister Ana Brnabić, Hungarian prime minister Viktor Orbán, mayor of Novi Sad Miloš Vučević, Vojvodina president of the government Igor Mirović, Vojvodina president of the assembly István Pásztor, Serbian deputy prime minister Maja Gojković, and Serbian minister of finance Siniša Mali.

The construction of the 107.4 km section between Novi Sad and Subotica (Hungarian border) started on 7 April 2022 and was due to be completed by the end of 2024. During the second reconstruction period the railway station continued to provide services along reconstructed Belgrade train line, with temporary ticket booths and machines opened in the station's western entrance while the main building was reconstructed again.

The second reconstruction of the railways station building was completed on 5 July 2024. The station's ceremonious second re-opening was attended by the mayor of Novi Sad Milan Đurić, Serbian minister of construction, transport and infrastructure Goran Vesić, and the Vojvodina president of the government Maja Gojković. Since 20 October 2024, additional construction occurred in the interior of the main building that lasted all the way to November of the same year.

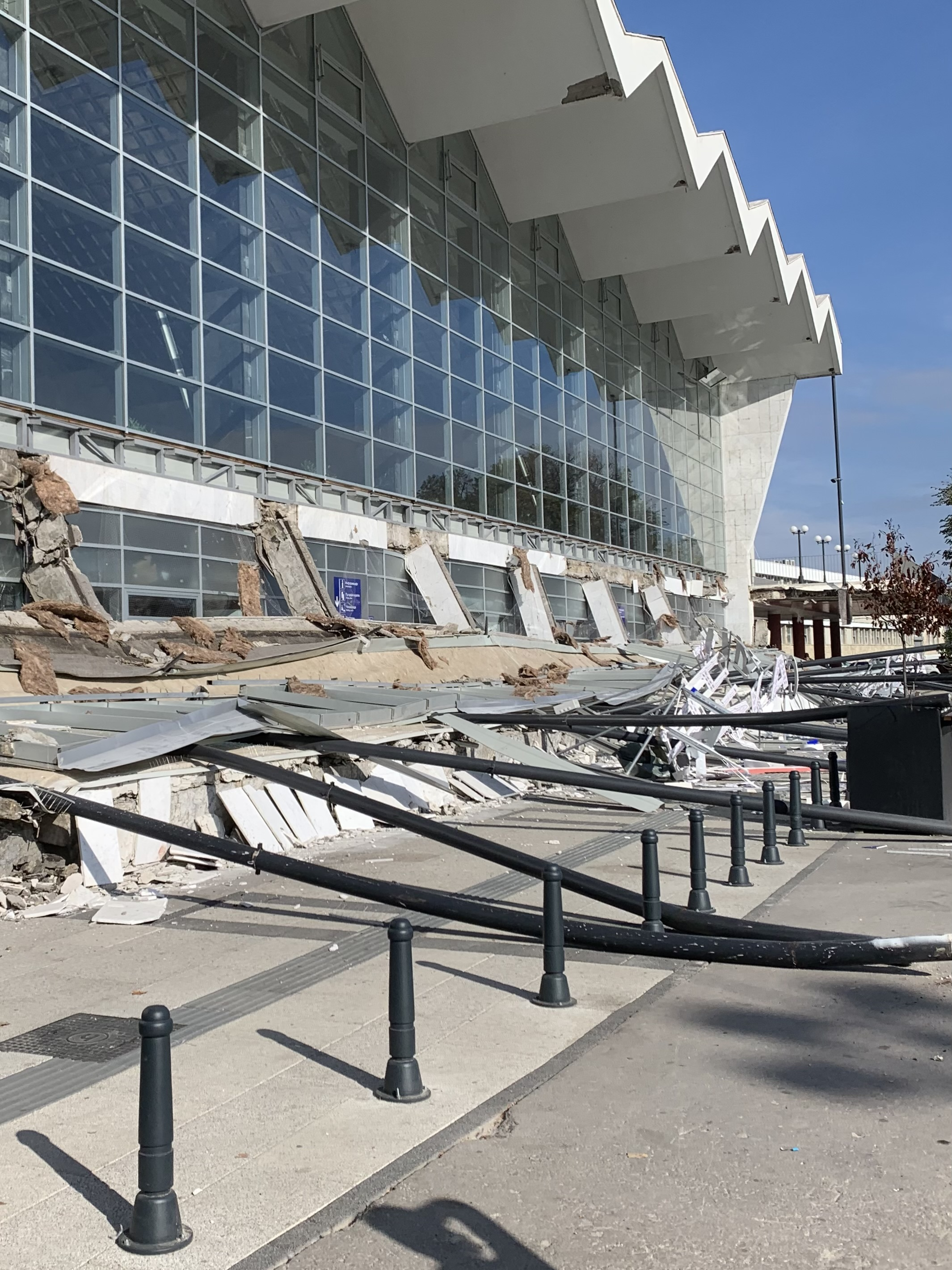
Aftermath of the canopy collapse in November 2024

==== November 2024 canopy collapse ====
On 1 November 2024, at around noon, the concrete canopy above the entrance of the reconstructed building collapsed. Sixteen people were killed while one was injured. Two people were trapped under the rubble and rescued during the day. Train departures at the station were suspended and the building closed for an undisclosed period. All public rail traffic for Novi Sad from Subotica and Sombor were moved to the Futog railway station, while traffic from Belgrade was moved to the Petrovaradin railway station.

== Train services ==
=== International trains ===
- 340/341 (Beograd) Belgrade Centre – Novi Sad – Subotica – Budapest Keleti (Currently not operational)
- 342/343 Belgrade Centre – Novi Sad – Subotica – Budapest Keleti (Currently not operational)
- 344/345 (EC Avala) Belgrade Centre – Novi Sad – Subotica – Budapest Keleti – Wien Hbf (Currently not operational)
- 1136/1137 (Panonija) Bar – Belgrade Centre – Novi Sad – Subotica

=== Inter City Serbia ===
- 540/541 (ICS Palić) Belgrade Centre – Novi Sad – Subotica

=== Regio Express ===
- Novi Sad – Belgrade Centre
- Novi Sad – Vrbas – Subotica

=== Local trains ===
- Novi Sad – Belgrade
- Novi Sad – Vrbas – Subotica
- Novi Sad – Vrbas
- Novi Sad – Bogojevo – Sombor
- Novi Sad – Bogojevo – Sombor – Subotica
- Novi Sad – Inđija – Šid
- Novi Sad – Inđija – Sremska Mitrovica

== Gallery ==
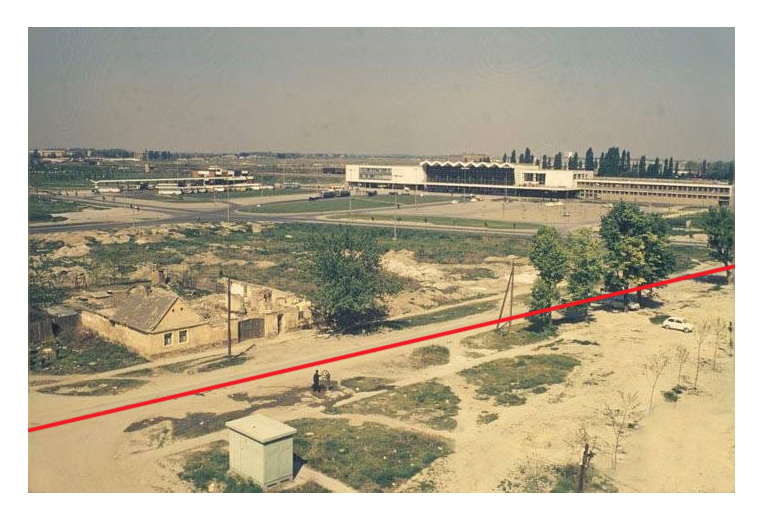
Novi Sad railway station and 23 October Boulevard (now Liberation Boulevard), 1960s–1970s

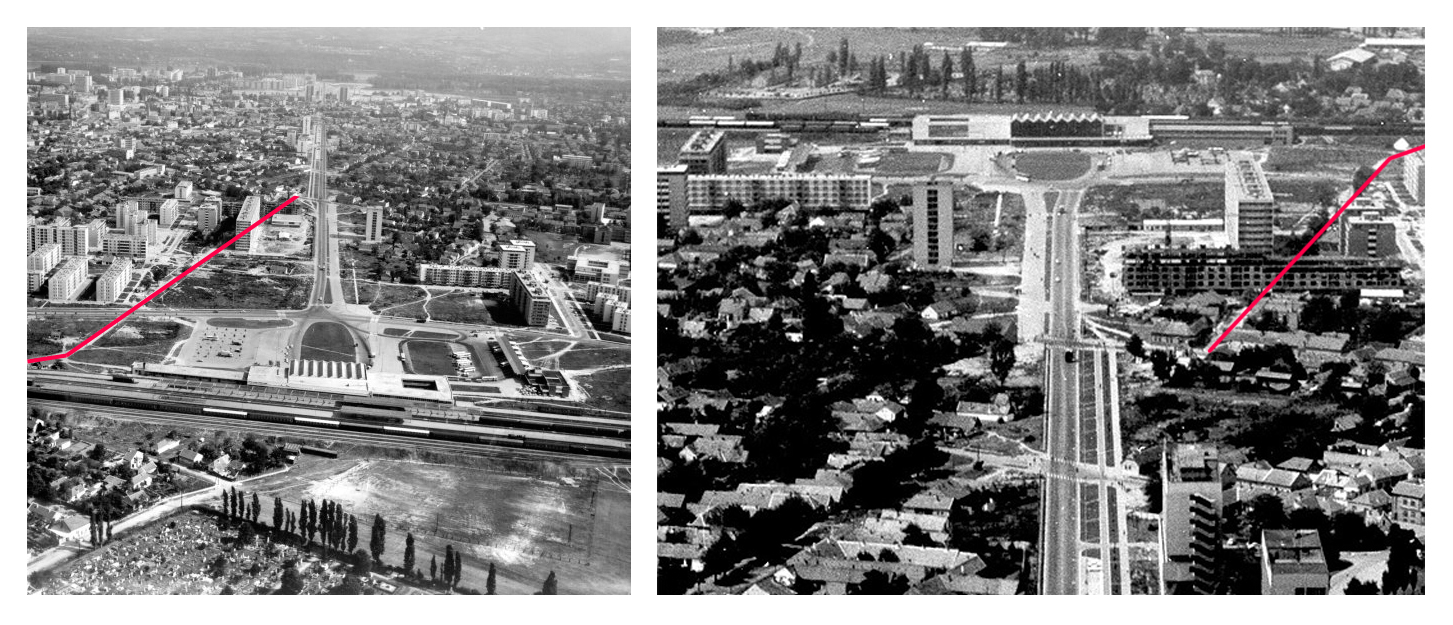
Novi Sad railway station and 23 October Boulevard (now Liberation Boulevard), 1960s–1970s

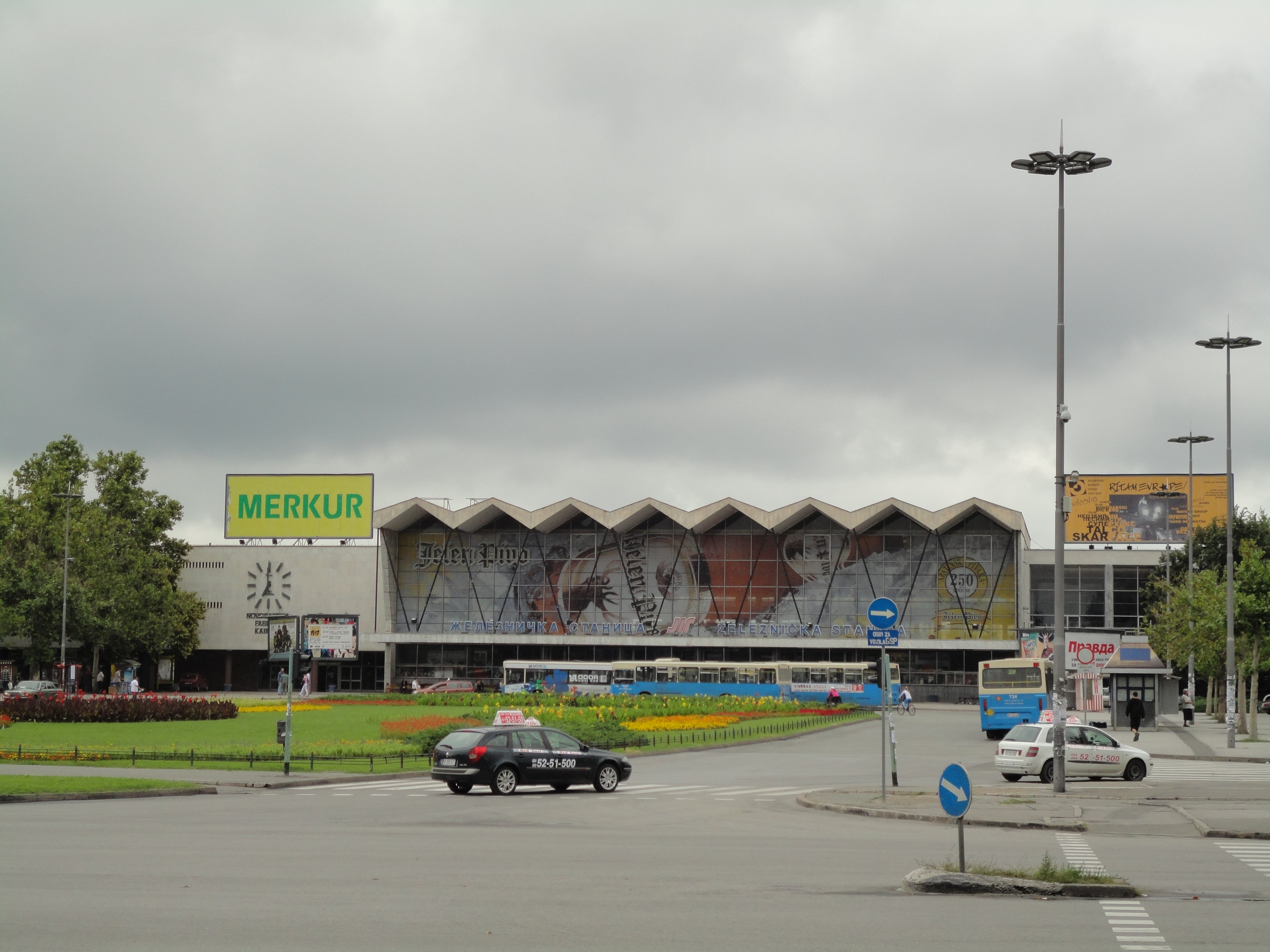
Exterior of Novi Sad railway station, July 2010

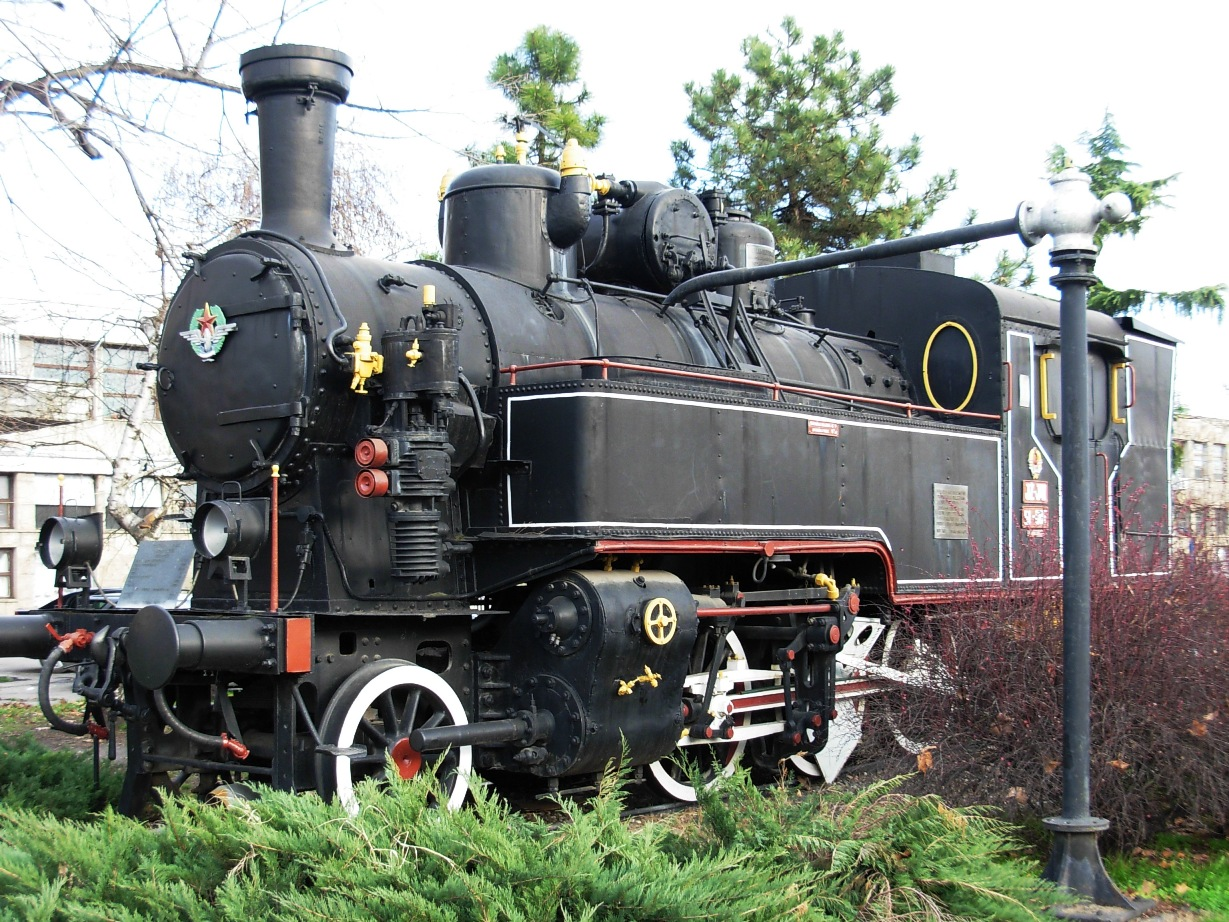
JŽ 51-007 locomotive (built in 1925 and placed in its current location in 1988), December 2010

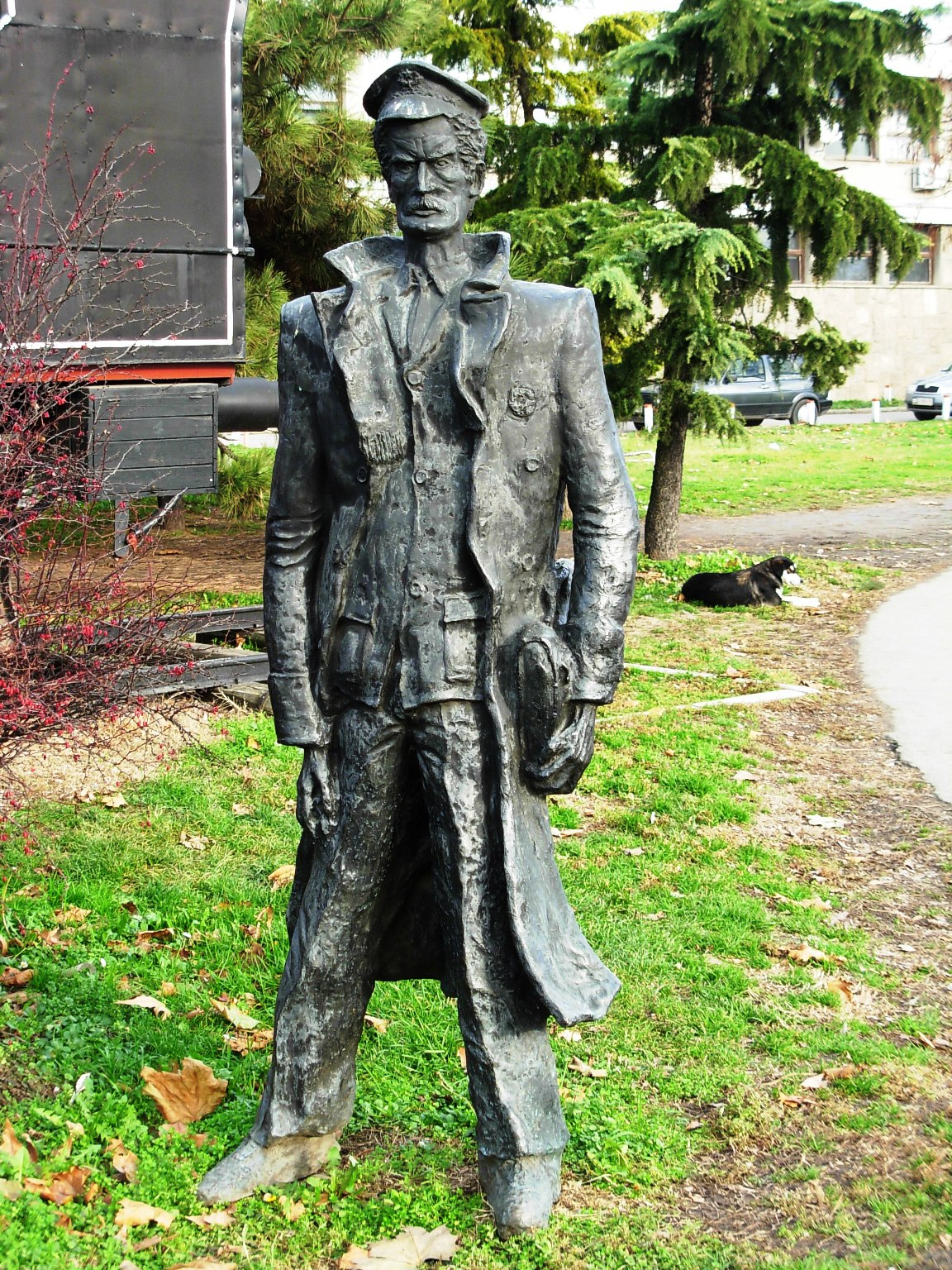
Statue of a Railway Worker (1989) by Radovan Moljski, December 2010

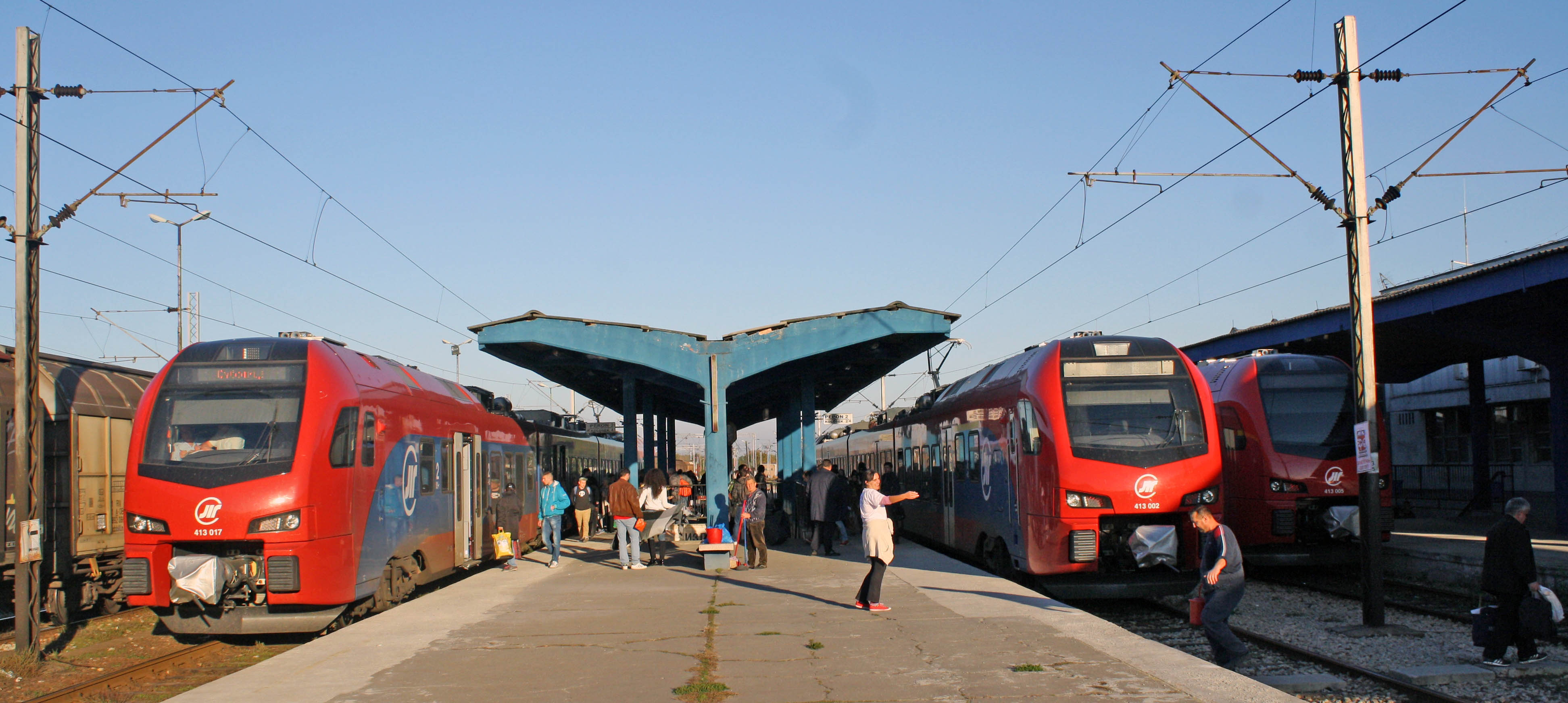
Three ŽS 413 Stadler FLIRT at Novi Sad railway station, October 2015

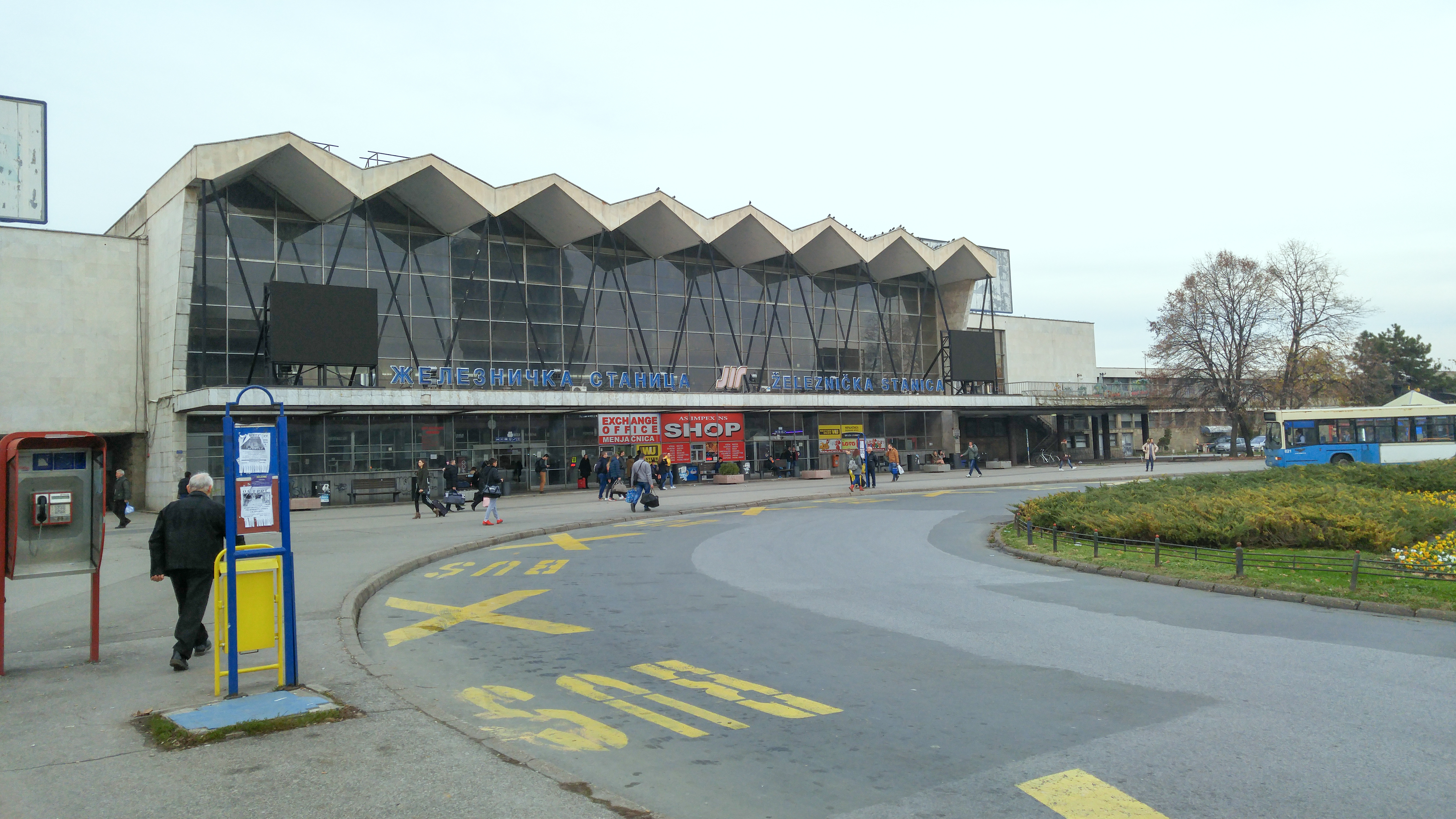
Exterior of Novi Sad railway station, November 2016

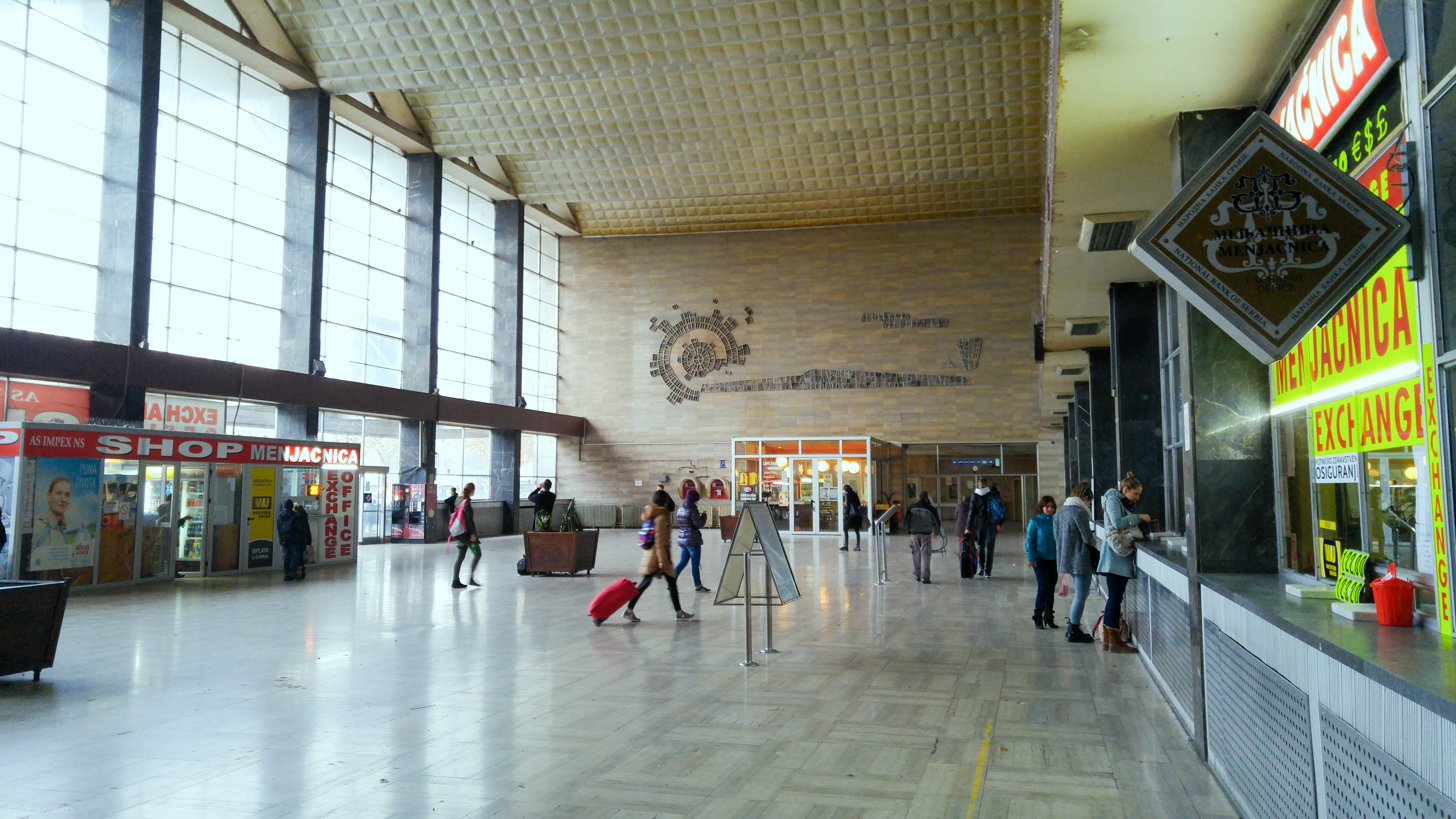
Interior of Novi Sad railway station with the "Zora u ravnici Vojvodine" composition (1964) done by Ljubiša Petrović, November 2016

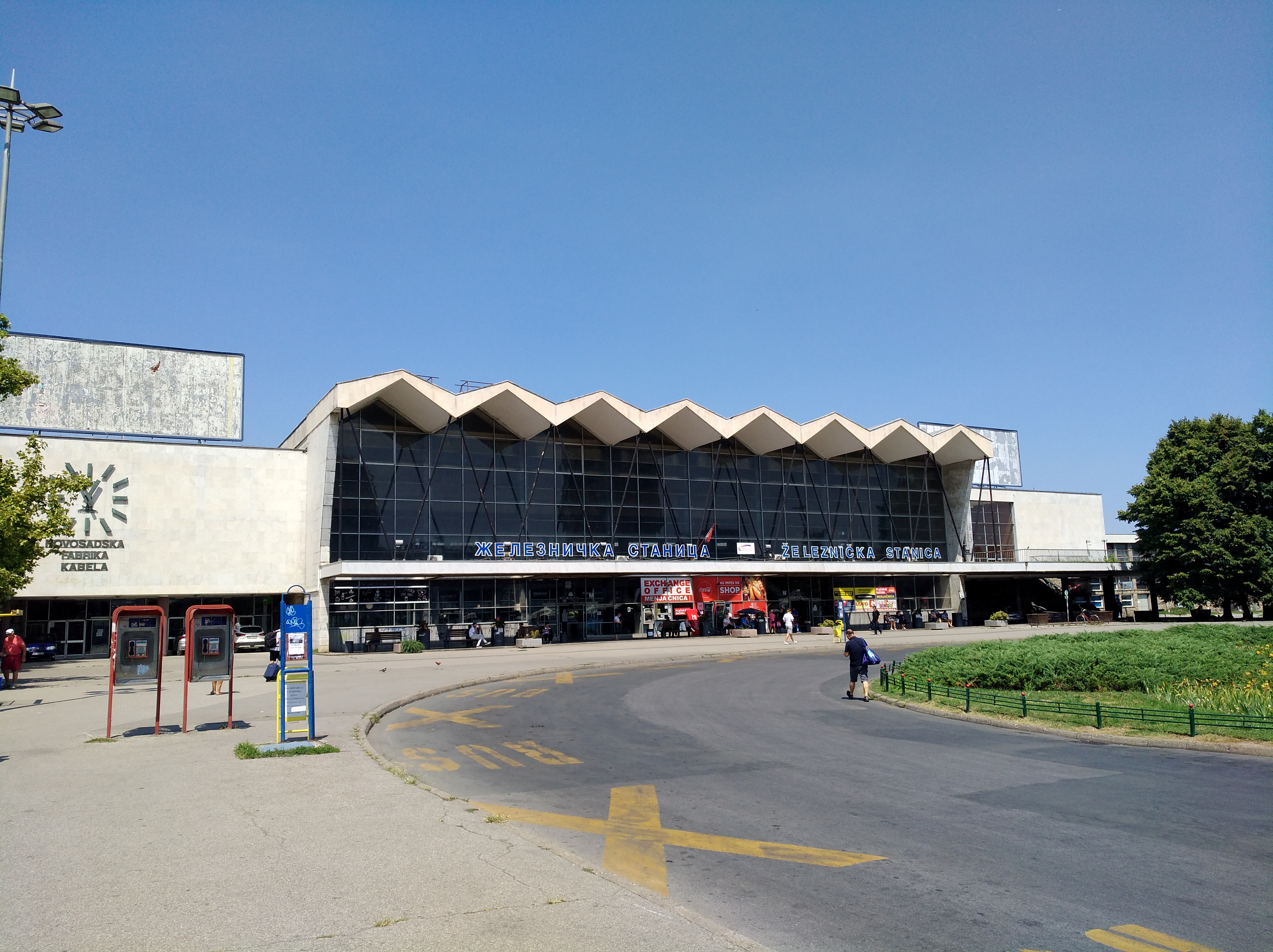
Exterior of Novi Sad railway station, July 2021

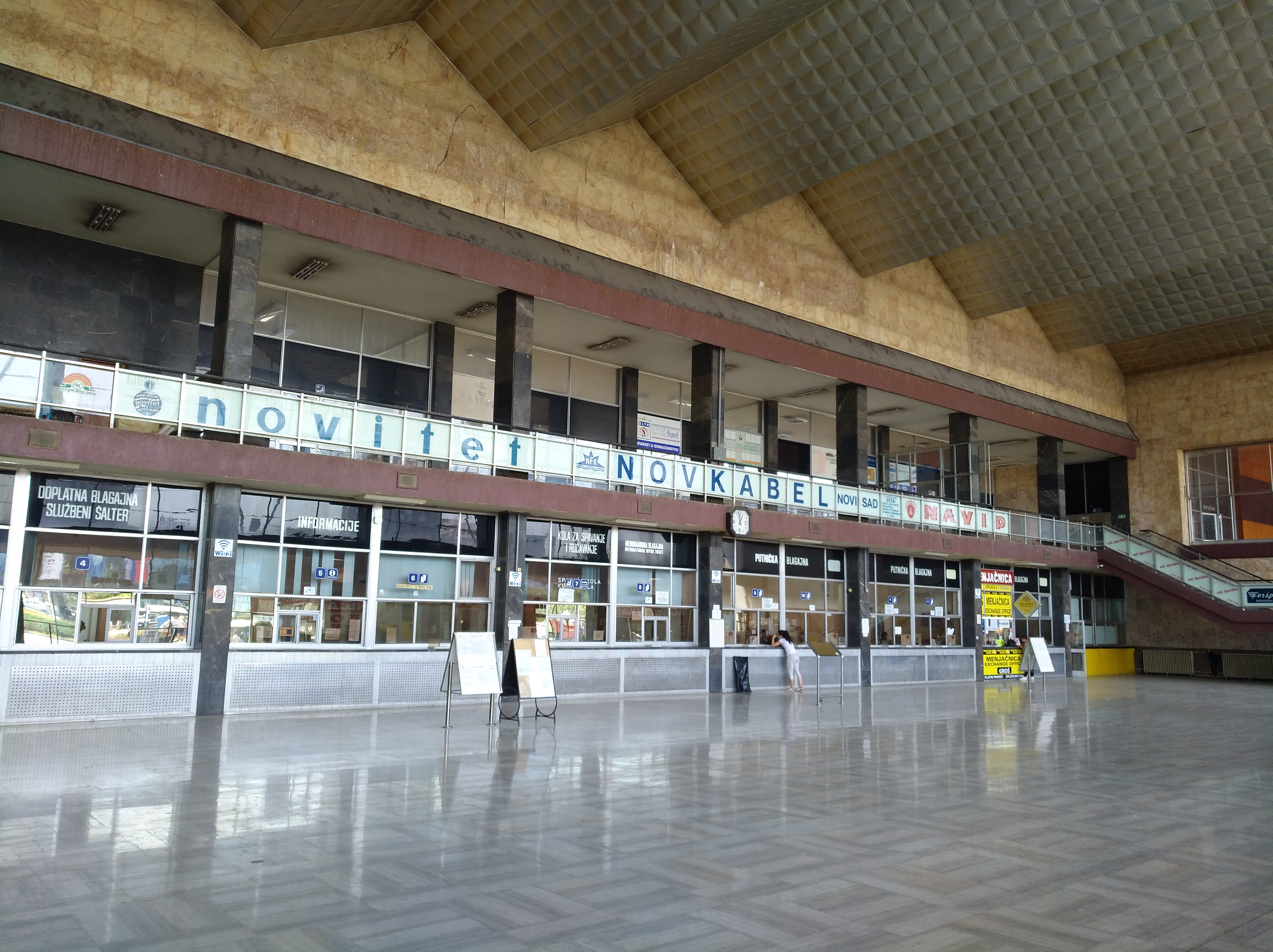
Interior of Novi Sad railway station, July 2021

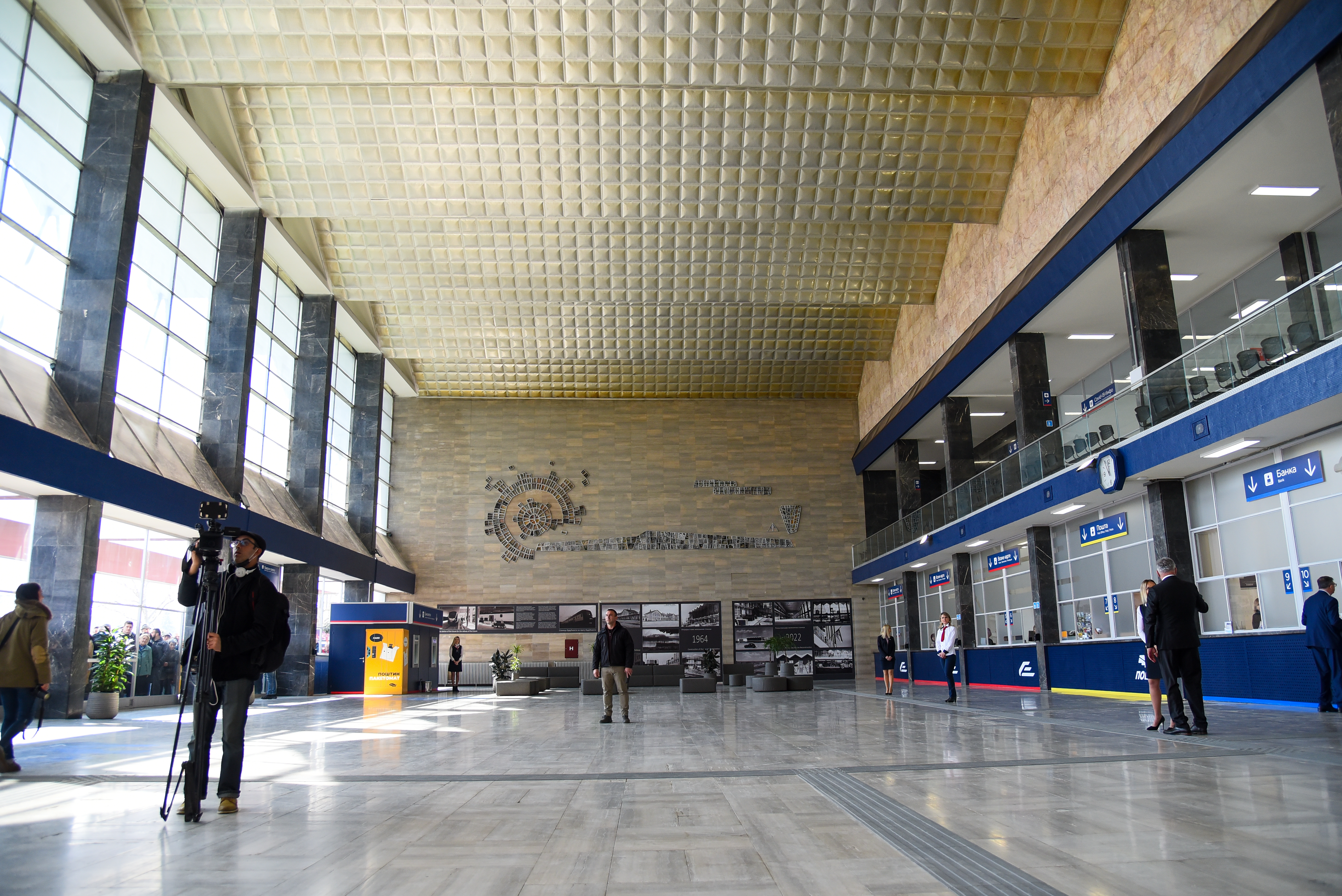
Interior of Novi Sad railway station with the "Zora u ravnici Vojvodine" composition (1964) done by Ljubiša Petrović, March 2022

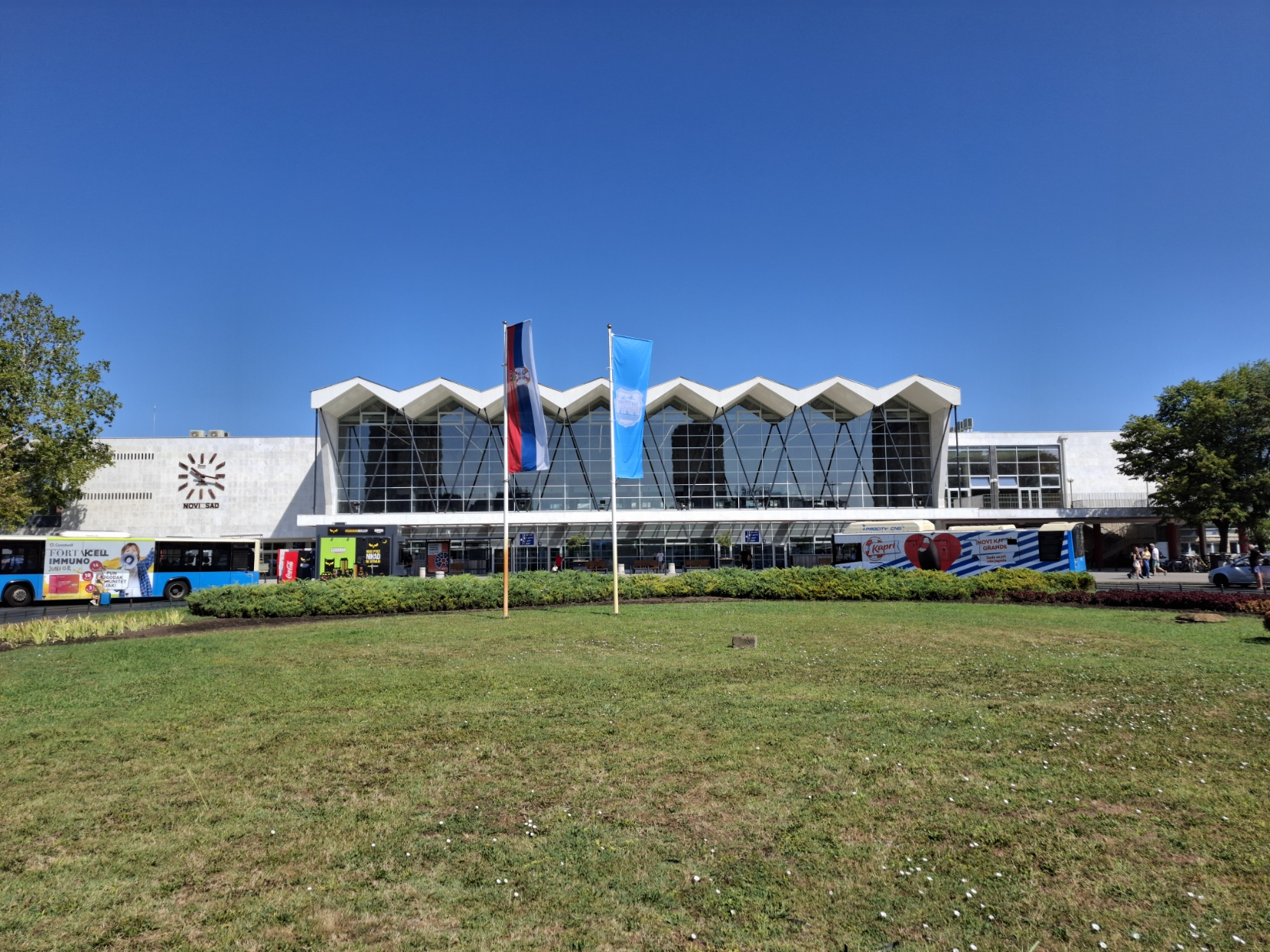
Exterior of Novi Sad railway station, August 2024

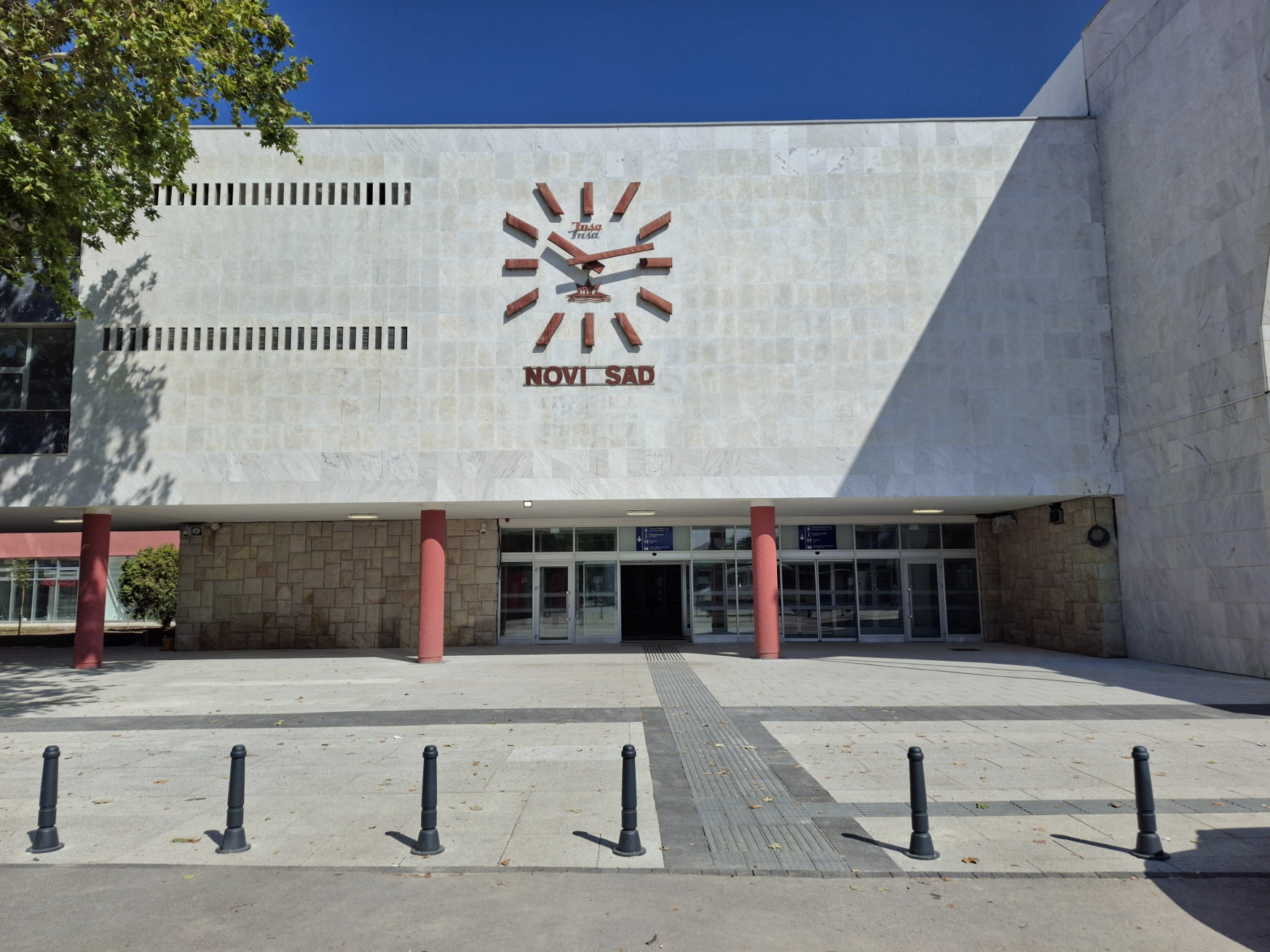
Public clock at Novi Sad railway station, August 2024

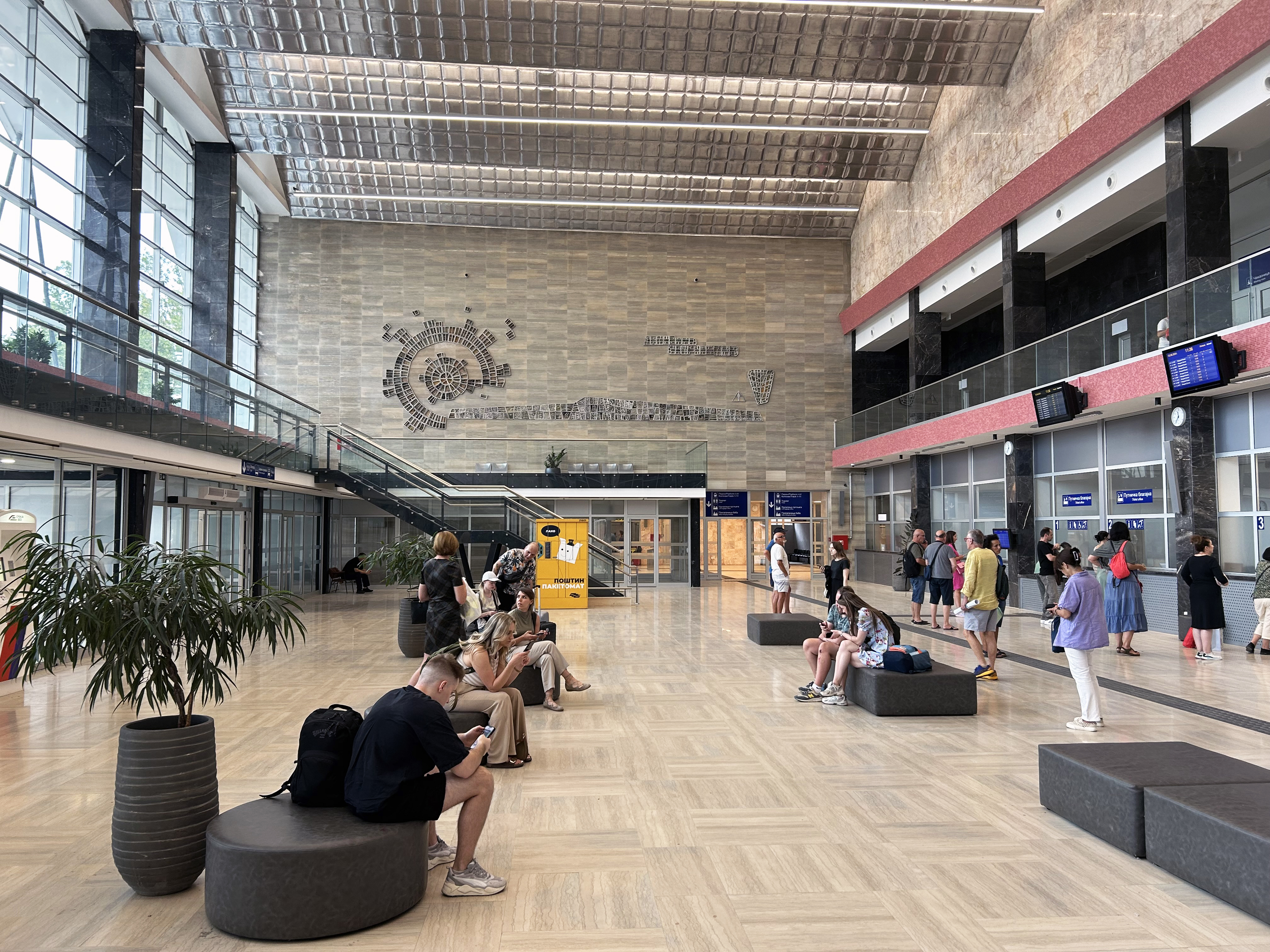
Interior of Novi Sad railway station with the "Zora u ravnici Vojvodine" composition (1964) done by Ljubiša Petrović, August 2024
