= Novi Sad railway station canopy collapse =

2024 disaster in Serbia

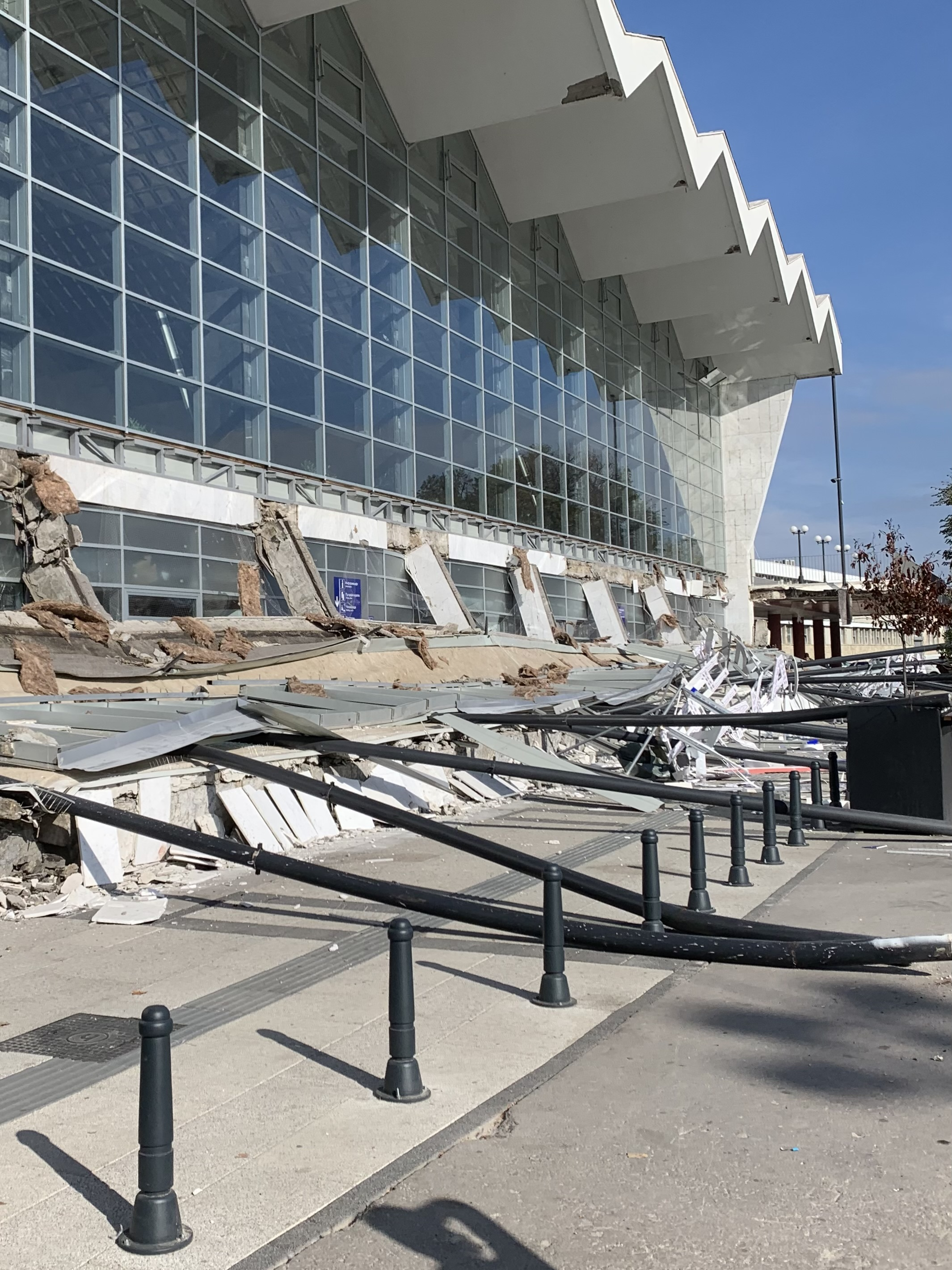
- Canopy of the main railway station in Novi Sad, Serbia, after the collapse
- Date: 1 November 2024
- Time: 11:52 (CET)
- Location: Novi Sad railway station, Novi Sad, Serbia; 45°15′56″N 19°49′46″E
- Type: Structural failure
- Cause: Under investigation
- Deaths: 16
- Injuries: 1

On 1 November 2024, the concrete canopy of the main railway station in Novi Sad, Serbia, collapsed onto the busy pavement below, killing 16 people and severely injuring one more. The station building was constructed in 1964, and was renovated from 2021 to mid-2024 with support from China's Belt and Road Initiative. As of April 2026, the cause of the collapse is still under investigation. The collapse spawned a series of mass protests in Novi Sad, which then spread throughout Serbia, fueled by dissatisfaction with other issues including government corruption and media censorship.

== Background ==
=== Station building ===
The canopy prior to collapse

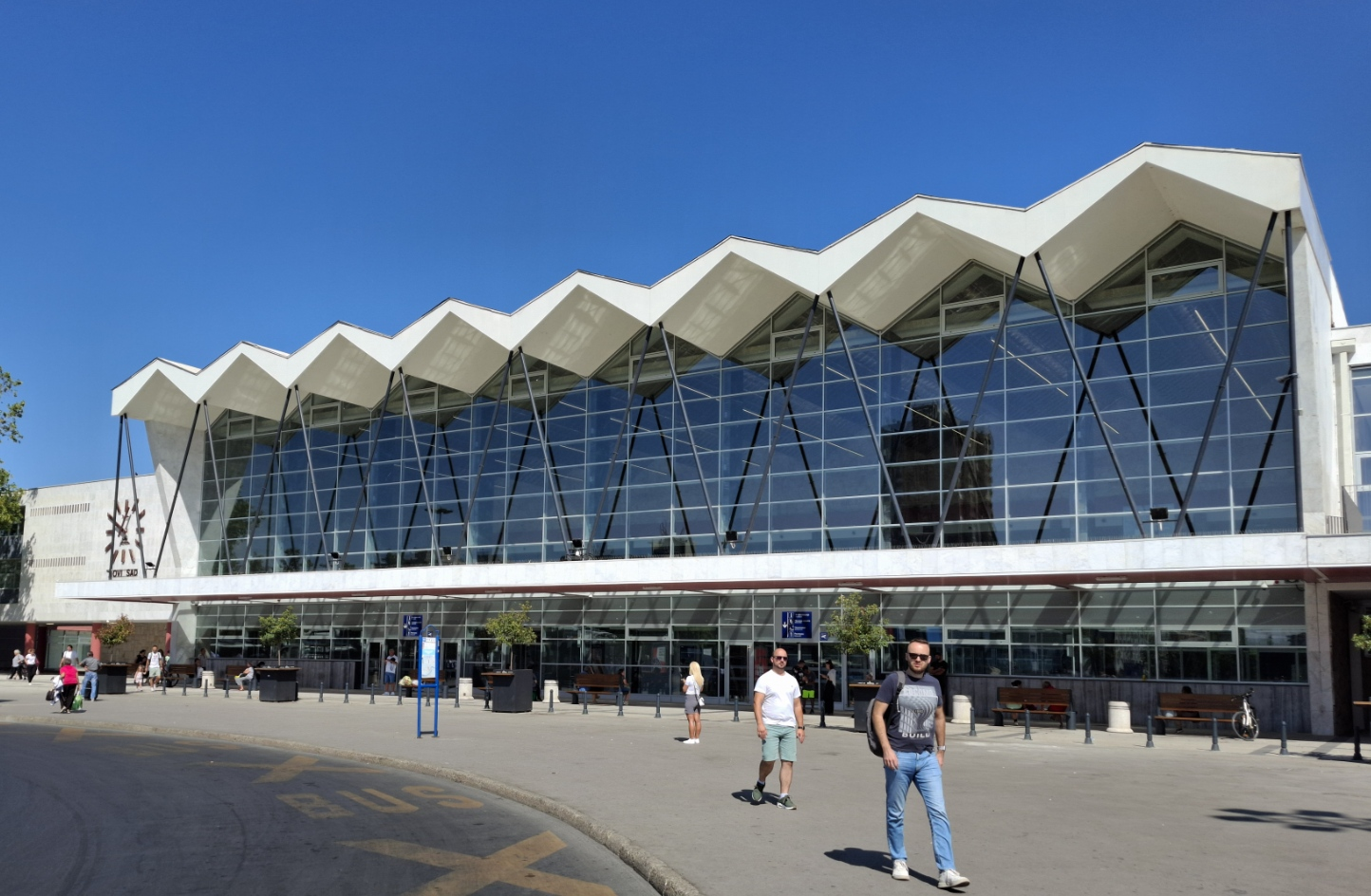
August 2024: The canopy is the slab-like structure overhanging the entrance, suspended from the cantilevered roof via a series of V-configured tension elements, and joined to the building's pillars by horizontal concrete beams.

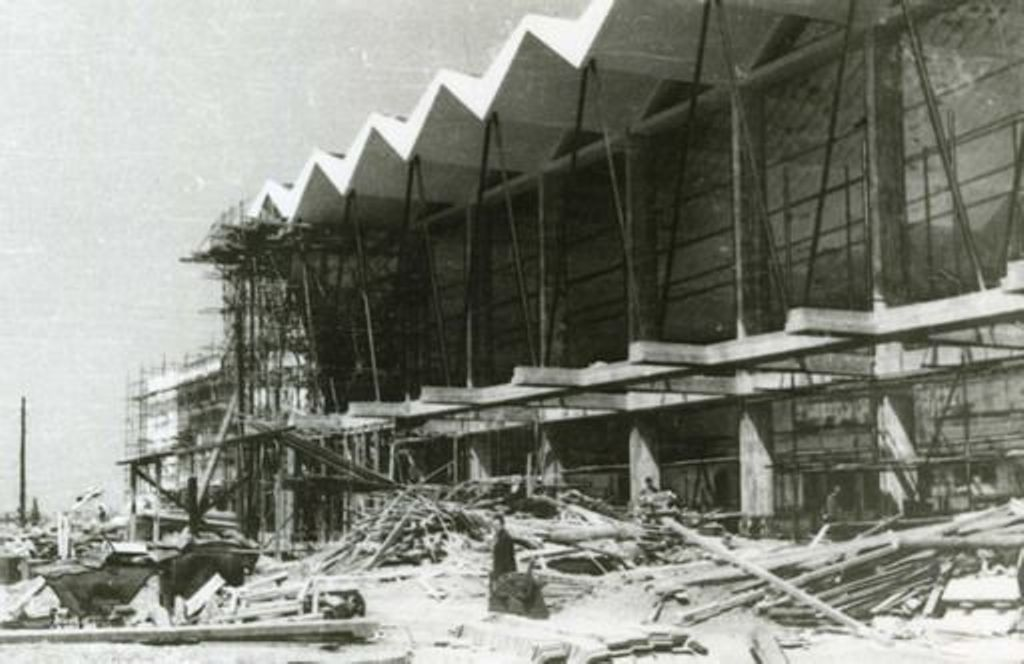
1963 or 1964: The canopy's reinforced concrete beams to which the tension elements connected, visible during the construction, along with the pillars.

The railway station was constructed in 1964. The building was structurally advanced for its period and location, and is relatively unusual. The roof, made from concrete slabs, is ridged and cantilevers over the main entrance. A suspended structure hung from this extending portion of the roof using steel tension elements. This structure mainly consisted of reinforced concrete beams that overhung the entrance to act as a canopy. The canopy also joined the building's front columns, which are covered by a glass curtain wall, but was primarily a suspended structure.

Multiple experts suggested a service life of no more than 50 years for either the canopy or the particular materials that were used. The station stood in its original form for 57 years, without substantial renovations, and by the early 2000s, it had become relatively decrepit and unhygienic, with some of its facilities and equipment out of operation.

=== Renovation ===
By the early decades of the 21st century, Serbian rail was outdated and dilapidated. In 2013, stemming from China's Belt and Road Initiative, China, Hungary, and Serbia signed a memorandum of understanding to redevelop the Budapest–Belgrade railway (Note: intended to become a part of the future Budapest–Belgrade–Skopje–Athens railway) by introducing high-speed rail, with the start of works originally scheduled for 2015. Novi Sad, Serbia's second-largest city, is one of the cities along this stretch of rail line. An upgrade of the city's station infrastructure and renovation of the station building began in 2021, according to the technical documents (Note: these include: Conceptual design with feasibility study; Environmental impact assessment; Design for building permit; Technical execution design) developed by the state-owned Saobraćajni institut CIP, while construction supervision was given to the consortium of six engineering firms where Egis was supervising engineer, while Utiber (headquartered in Hungary with a bureau in Novi Sad) was at the head consortium.

The station is listed with the Institute for the Protection of Cultural Monuments of Novi Sad as a "property enjoying prior protection" (one of the built heritage preservation statuses in Serbia). Thus, prior to the start of renovations, the Institute issued conservation guidelines, which required that the renovation of the canopy overhanging the main entrance preserve its visual identity. They did not address the topic of its reconstruction, as structural engineering was outside the purview of the Institute.

The station was renovated from 2021 to mid-2024. The project included a total reconstruction of the railway platforms, including the platform underpass and canopy, (Note: This canopy is distinct from the canopy overhanging the main entrance.) as well as renovations to the floors, walls, and the roof of the station building, including the replacement of the building's facade materials. According to CIP's technical document, the station building was "in good condition structurally, and no damage affecting the stability of the structure [was] observed through visual inspection" prior to commencement of work.

The work was completed by a consortium of the Chinese companies China Railway International Co., Ltd (a subsidiary of China Railway Group Limited) and China Communications Construction Company, Ltd. (together referred to as CRIC-CCCC). The station was initially ceremonially reopened in 2022, before that year's general election. Renovation work resumed after the election, and the station was reopened again on 5 July 2024.

In January 2024, the local news outlet Portal 021 requested contracts and invoices related to the renovation project from the Ministry of Construction, Transport and Infrastructure and Serbian Railways Infrastructure. This request was denied, as CRIC-CCCC objected to sharing contract details with third parties until the project's completion and confirmation of satisfactory work.

Both CRIC-CCCC and Serbian Railways Infrastructure, the state enterprise which operates the building, subsequently stated that the front-entrance canopy was not reconstructed during the renovations and that it was an original part of the structure. What work was done to it was merely a conservation treatment consistent with the Institute's guidelines, the official bodies stated.

== Collapse and rescue ==
Fatalities

1. Milica Adamović (2008), from Kać
2. Sanja Ćirić Arbutina (1989), from Kać
3. Đorđe Firić (1971), from Kovilj
4. Sara Firić (2018), from Kovilj
5. Valentina Firić (2014), from Kovilj
6. Stefan Hrka (1997), from Belgrade
7. Mileva Karanović (1948), from Kać
8. Nemanja Komar (2007), from Stepanovićevo
9. Miloš Milosavljević (2003), from Knićanin
10. Goranka Raca (1966), from Novi Sad
11. Vukašin Raković (1955), from Bukovac
12. Anđela Ruman (2004), from Stara Pazova
13. Vasko Sazdovski (1979), from Sveti Nikole, North Macedonia
14. Đuro Švonja (1947), from Stepanovićevo
15. Anja Radonjić (2000) from Paraćin
16. Vukašin Crnčević (2006), from Zmajevo

On 1 November 2024, at 11:52 CET, the station's 48-metre-long (157 ft) concrete canopy collapsed onto people walking and sitting underneath. Fourteen people were killed in the collapse and three others were injured. The dead included thirteen Serbian nationals, and one Macedonian national.

About 80 rescuers from multiple cities across Serbia used heavy machinery, including excavators and cranes, to pull debris off the collapse site. Of the three victims who survived with injuries, two women were trapped under the rubble and were rescued several hours after the collapse. All three injured had undergone amputations and were in serious condition. One of the women, Anja Radonjić, died 16 days later from the severity of her injuries. On 21 March 2025, another of the three died — a 19-year-old man, Vukašin Crnčević.

== Aftermath ==
Train departures at the station were suspended for 10 minutes and the building closed for an undetermined period of time. All public rail traffic for Novi Sad from Subotica and Sombor was moved to Futog railway station, while traffic from Belgrade was moved to Petrovaradin railway station. The Serbian government declared a nation-wide day of mourning for 2 November, while the Autonomous Province of Vojvodina and the City of Novi Sad declared three days of mourning in the city. Citizens lit candles and laid flowers at Freedom Square and in front of the railway station.

=== Investigation ===
The Novi Sad Higher Public Prosecutor's Office initiated an investigation. More than 40 people, including construction minister Goran Vesić, were subjected to questioning. At least 11 people were allegedly arrested or brought in to the prosecutor's office by the police, including Vesić, who said that he had voluntarily surrendered. On 30 December 2024, Vesić and 12 others were formally indicted over the collapse. On 24 December 2025, the Novi Sad High Court dropped charges against Vesić and five other defendants over the collapse, citing insufficient evidence. As of April 2026, no official cause or responsibility for the collapse has been assigned, and the High Court's decision to drop charges is being reviewed by the Court of Appeal in Novi Sad.

=== Cause ===
According to the testimony of experts from the Faculty of Technical Sciences in Novi Sad, the canopy would have collapsed even without any reconstruction work. They stated that the primary cause of the collapse was corrosion on the tension rods, which led to the weakening of the structure. Although the tension rods were designed with a safety factor of 2.25, which would have allowed them to withstand an additional load of 40 to 50 kilograms per square meter, corrosion significantly affected their load-bearing capacity. They pointed out that the canopy would likely have collapsed very quickly due to the progress of corrosion and the additional load from wind and snow. The cause of the corrosion could not be precisely determined, but they assumed that it occurred about 25 to 35 centimeters from the anchors embedded in the roof. They were unable to determine the time frame in which the corrosion developed. One of the reports on the condition of the station roof stated that water was accumulating on the roof due to clogged gutters and downspouts, which could have contributed to the corrosion and weakening of the structure.

According to a statement by Professor Nenad Ivanišević of the Faculty of Civil Engineering in Novi Sad, the collapse of the canopy at the Novi Sad railway station was most likely caused by significant corrosion of the prestressing wires in the rods. According to Ivanišević, this problem arose due to inadequate protection of the wires during the construction of the canopy in the early 1960s. Corrosion affected about 40% of the rods, which led to a reduction in their load-bearing capacity by the same percentage. Ivanišević pointed out that the main corrosion problems were in the short section where the wires passed through the roof structure, and in that section they were not visible or accessible for any inspection. Ivanišević stressed that the engineers could not have detected any structural problems, as there were no visible cracks or other signs of damage. He added that if he had been in their place, he would have done the same and signed off that everything was fine.

Civil engineer Danijel Dašić claimed that the canopy collapsed because a massive steel structure with heavy glass had been added to it during the reconstruction. The website gradnja.rs published an article in July 2024, after the reconstruction, claiming that a "new steel canopy" had been built after the reconstruction, only for the article to be changed on the day of the accident, and then reinstated. Authorities claimed that the canopy had not been reconstructed. Footage later surfaced on social media showing workers repairing the cosmetic ceramic tiles on it. Geological engineer Zoran Đajić, who was part of the team that reconstructed the train station, also claimed that work had been done on the canopy. In March 2023, he requested that the marble slabs from the facade of the building be removed in order to check the condition of the canopy slab and rod anchors. He also claimed that the reason for the collapse was either additional weight placed on the canopy during the reconstruction, or corrosion of the anchors.

== Reactions ==
=== Domestic ===
==== 2024 ====
Serbian Railways expressed regret over the disaster. Government ministers, Prime Minister of Serbia Miloš Vučević and Đurić visited the disaster site. President of Serbia Aleksandar Vučić vowed "justice" for those responsible, while opposition parties accused authorities of corruption. The following day, Mayor of Novi Sad Milan Đurić stated that forensic investigators are examining the debris, that the cause of the disaster is unknown, that the investigation needs to conclude before any talk of resignations, that the rest of the structure appears to be in normal condition, and appealed to citizens to "trust the state and the system", adding that the individuals responsible will be held accountable.

After the collapse, many people on social media condemned the government for negligence. The main point of contention were claims by Serbian Railways Infrastructure that the canopy had not been reconstructed. Another point of controversy was the refusal of CRIC-CCCC to share documentation of the reconstruction publicly. On 3 November, protests were held in front of the Ministry of Construction, Transport and Infrastructure in Belgrade calling for the resignation and arrest of officials deemed responsible for the disaster. On 4 November, construction minister Goran Vesić announced his resignation, pending acknowledgement by the National Assembly, scheduled for the next day, while stating that he "does not accept guilt". On 5 November, protests over the disaster were held in front of the railway station and other locations in Novi Sad, leading to clashes with police and at least 12 people, ten of whom were police officers, being injured. Projectiles and red paint were thrown at the regional offices of the ruling Serbian Progressive Party and later at the city hall. At least nine people were arrested, and the incident prompted a visit by President Vučić.

Another protest was held in Belgrade on 11 November, while a silent protest was held in Novi Sad on 15 November, during which demonstrators blocked crossroads outside the railway station. On 19 November, protesters blockaded a courthouse in Novi Sad demanding the arrest of those responsible for the disaster and the release of people imprisoned during previous protests. On 20 November, foreign trade and former construction minister Tomislav Momirović announced his resignation. On 22 November, a 15-minute silence was observed by protesters across Serbia in memory of the 15 fatalities, along with traffic blockages.

On 25 November, scuffles broke out during a budget hearing in the National Assembly after opposition MPs displayed a banner reading "blood is on your hands" and demanded a discussion on the disaster while government MPs displayed another banner accusing their counterparts of wanting "war while Serbia wants to work". On 11 December, after weeks of student-led protests, Vučić made concessions including promising that all prosecutorial documents related to the disaster would be publicized, announced that all currently held protestors were released, and pledged to pardon any protestors if they were convicted at trial.

==== 2025 ====
On 28 January 2025, Vučević resigned as prime minister following an incident in which four ruling party supporters, including associates of his son, assaulted a female student in Novi Sad who was applying pro-protest stickers, breaking her jaw. The collapse sparked a nationwide protest movement led primarily by university students demanding accountability for the disaster, the release of all related documentation, and broader anti-corruption measures. The protests, which began in November 2024 and continued into 2025, became some of the largest demonstrations in Serbia since the 2000 overthrow of Slobodan Milošević.

In mid-2025, Vučić pardoned individuals accused of attacking protesters, including four ruling party supporters who assaulted student demonstrators in Novi Sad in January and a woman who drove into protesters in Belgrade, while protesters continued to maintain that not all documents related to the Novi Sad investigation had been made public.

A demonstration at the national parliament was had on the one-year anniversary of the collapse. To mark her dissatisfaction with the Vučić government, Dijana Hrka, the mother of one of the victims (Stefan) launched a hunger strike there. Riot police were dispatched there as well as to Novi Sad. Hundreds had been detained in the preceding months and pro-government media branded protesting university students as terrorists. By day three she had attracted the cameras of a Polish media. Students at some Serbian high schools left classes to show support for Dijana Hrka by day five. Hrka made three demands: 1 for the questioning and trial of all suspects linked to the disaster, 2 the release of all detained student protesters, and 3 snap elections. By then Vucevic, the PM who had resigned in January, had moved to her side. By day 16 Hrka had attracted the attention of the New York Times, which commissioned another piece the next day, on which she stopped her hunger strike.

==== 2026 ====
On 27 September 2026, Vučić resigned as Serbian president with under a year to complete his term of office, only to run in snap elections for the prime minister's office. Any president is barred from seeking a third term by the constitution of Serbia. The BBC said he was "embattled" by the Novi Sad railway station roof collapse. In one of his last acts as president, Vučić pardoned 23 individuals who have been prosecuted for offenses during the protests over the previous two years.

On 25 October 2026, the day of the snap elections, Vucic was defeated by the Student List in the elections.

=== International ===
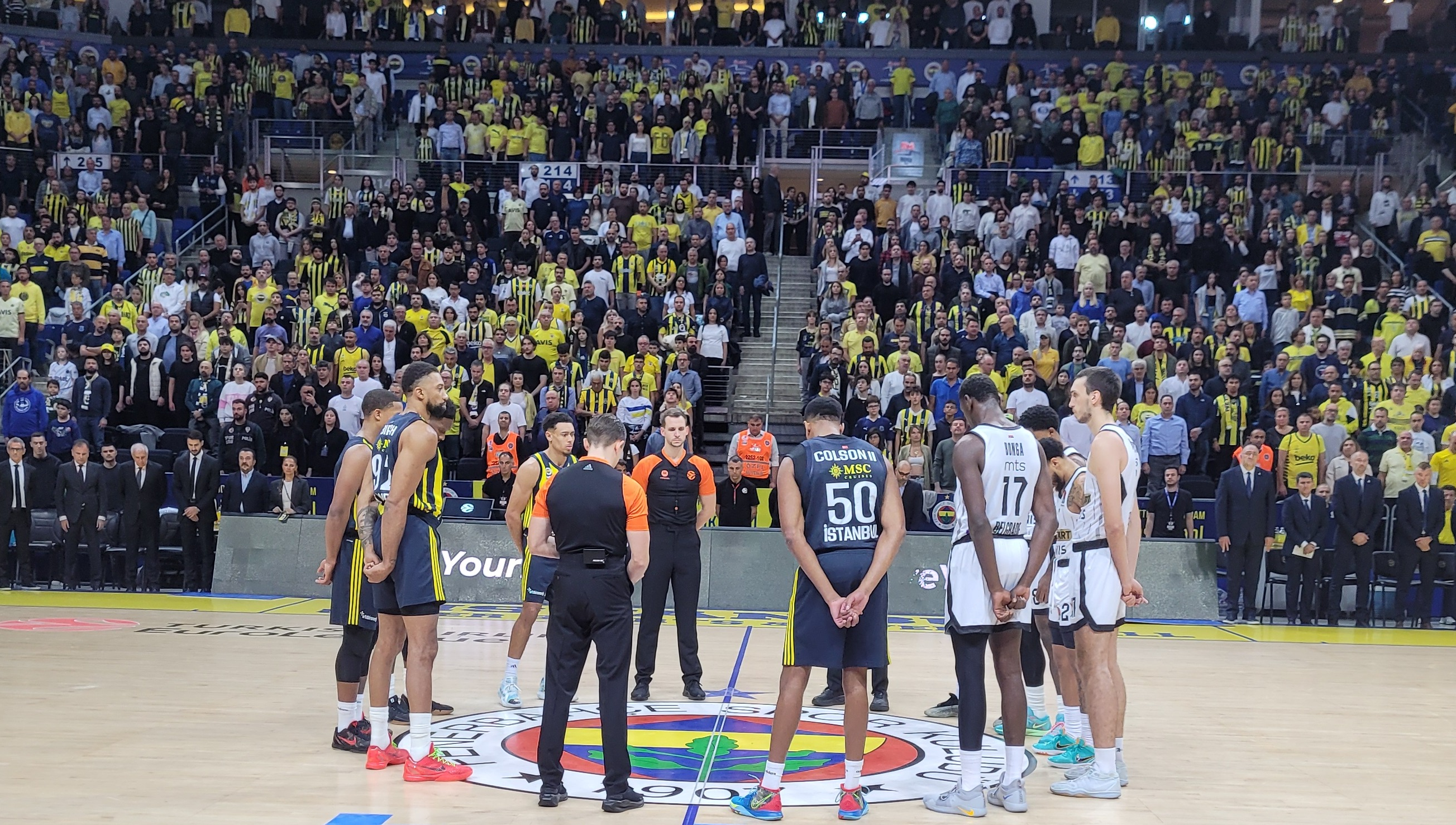
A moment of silence is observed before a EuroLeague basketball match between Fenerbahçe and Partizan in Istanbul

Several officials from the European Union have sent their condolences, such as the European Commissioner for Neighbourhood and Enlargement Olivér Várhelyi, EU Ambassador for Serbia Emanuele Giaufret, Chancellor of Austria Karl Nehammer, Prime Minister of Croatia Andrej Plenković, Prime Minister of Hungary Viktor Orbán, Minister of Infrastructure and Transport of Greece Christos Staikouras, and the Romanian Ministry of Foreign Affairs.

Several other international officials have also sent their regards, such as the members of the Bosnia and Herzegovina Presidency Denis Bećirović (Bosniaks) and Željka Cvijanović (Serbs), Minister of Communication and Traffic of Bosnia and Herzegovina Edin Forto, Minister of Communication and Traffic of Republika Srpska Nedeljko Čubrilović, the Ambassador of Japan in Serbia Akira Imamura, President of Kazakhstan Kassym-Jomart Tokayev, President of Montenegro Jakov Milatović, President of the Parliament of Montenegro Andrija Mandić, Minister of Transport of Montenegro Maja Vukičević, Norwegian Ambassador to Serbia Kristin Melsom, President of Russia Vladimir Putin, and Chairman of the State Duma of Russia Vyacheslav Volodin.

The Republika Srpska entity in Bosnia and Herzegovina and Montenegro declared a day of mourning for 2 and 3 November, respectively.

== See also ==
- List of building and structure collapses
