= Budapest–Belgrade railway =

Railway line in Hungary and Serbia

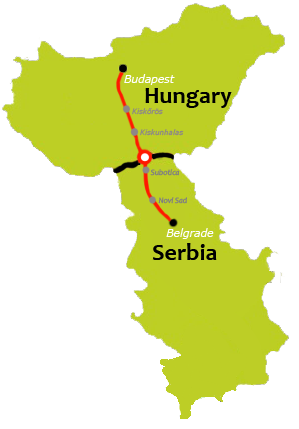
- Future HSR line connecting Belgrade with Budapest

Overview
- Status: Partially operational
- Locale: Serbia–Hungary
- Termini: Budapest Keleti; Belgrade Centre
- Stations: 7

Service
- Type: Higher to high-speed rail
- Operator: Serbian Railways (current)

History
- Opened: 3 October 2025 (Serbian section)

Technical
- Line length: 350 km (220 mi)
- Track gauge: 1,435 mm (4 ft 8 1/2 in) standard gauge
- Operating speed: 200 km/h (125 mph)

The Budapest–Belgrade railway connects the capital cities of Budapest, Hungary and Belgrade, Serbia, linking the Budapest Keleti railway station with Belgrade Centre railway station. Valued at $2.89 billion, the 350 km (220 mi) high-speed rail line is part of the planned Budapest–Belgrade–Skopje–Athens railway, an international route across Central and Southeast Europe. It is a flagship China-CEEC project under Beijing's Belt and Road Initiative, aimed at connecting the Chinese-operated Port of Piraeus in Greece with Central Europe.

== History ==
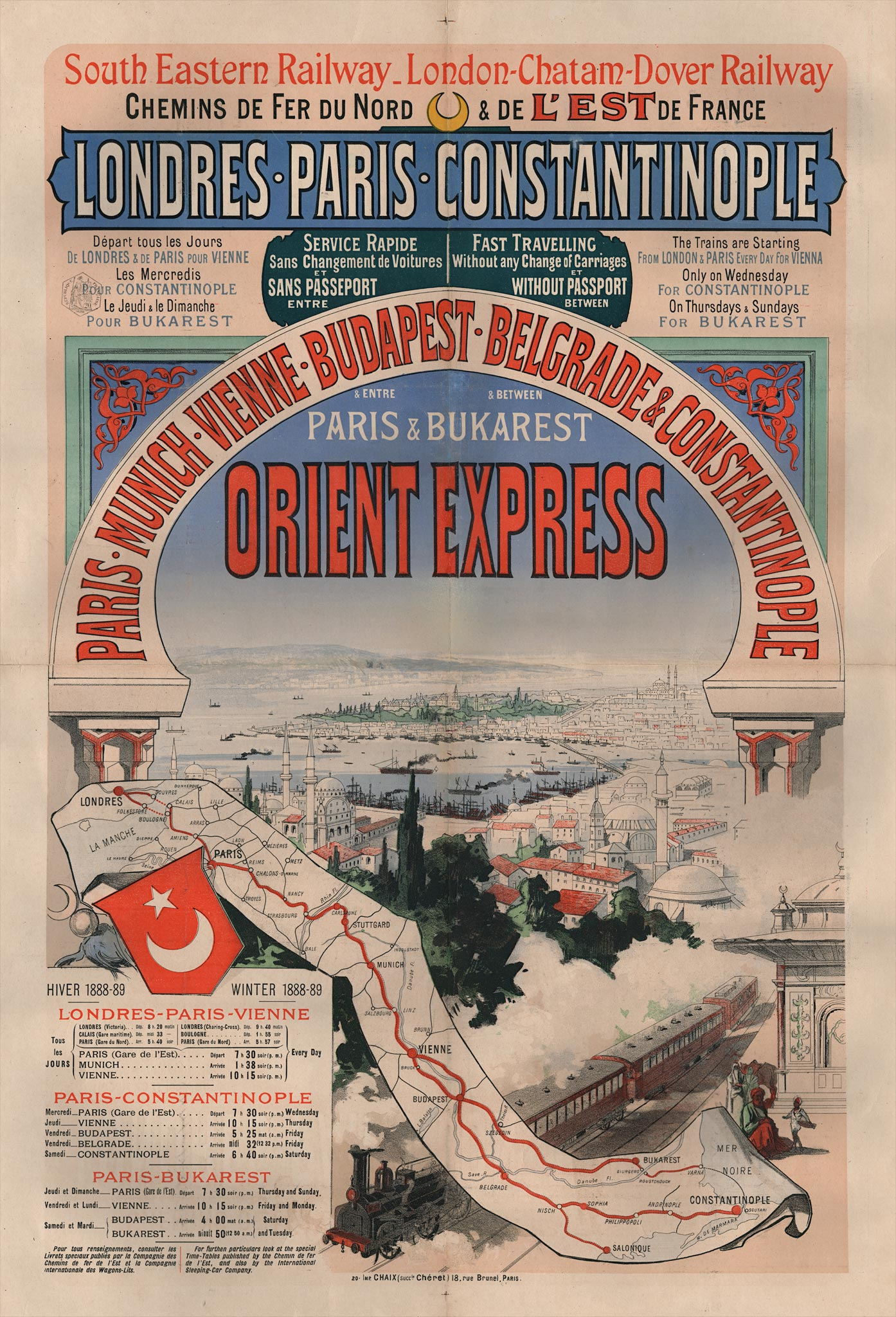
Historical advertisement, showing the Orient Express in 1888

The railway line between Budapest and Belgrade was used also by the Orient Express until 1914. The Orient Express was launched on 5 June 1883. It connected Paris and Constantinople (later renamed Istanbul).

== Route, geography and landscapes ==
The railway line between Budapest and Belgrade passes mainly the Bács-Kiskun County and the Serbian province of Vojvodina.

== Track condition, modernization ==
The outdated railway between Belgrade and Budapest will be modernised. The travel time should be decreased from eight hours to three and a half hours, and the maximum speed of the track is designed to be up to 200 km/h (125 mph) on the Serbian section and 160 km/h (100 mph) on the Hungarian section. When the project is complete, the journey between Budapest and Belgrade will be reduced to 3h 15m. The modernization is already complete, with full services running on the Serbian side up to Subotica, and the Hungary part is currently going through final testing with passenger services set to begin in March 2026.

=== Modernization of the Hungarian section ===
The Hungarian section (152 km (94 mi)) of the project was announced in 2015 to cost HUF 472 billion and expected to be completed as of 2017–2018. Currently it is expected to cost HUF 949 billion ($3.6 billion) with interest.

In Hungary, the project is carried out by Kínai-Magyar Vasúti Nonprofit Zrt (Chinese-Hungarian Railway Nonprofit Ltd.), a Hungarian-Chinese joint venture of MÁV Zrt. with China Railway International Corporation (CRIC) and China Railway International Group (CRIG). According to one estimate, the works on this section could begin in 2021, as one year is needed for the public procurement procedures, and two years for the planning and negotiation phase. The investment is widely criticised as it will never recover its costs.

The construction of the Hungarian part of the railway, 152 km, was started in October 2021 and has already been completed, with final testing in place with passenger services set to start in mid-March 2026.

The modernized passenger railway will begin at Budapest Keleti, with different types of passenger services going south:

- Eurocity service from Budapest to Belgrade, stopping only at Kiskunhalas and Kelebia on the Hungarian side. 73 minutes from Budapest to Kiskunhalas and 90 minutes to Kelebia. Trains will stay 30 minutes on the border at Kelebia with a shared Hungarian-Serbian passport inspection. The services will depart every two hours at 44 minutes past the hour. First service at 5:44 and last service at 19:44. The arrival from Belgrade will be every two hours at 14 minutes past the hour. First service arrives at 08:14 and last service at 20:14.
  - Two services per day will depart from Vienna, arriving in Budapest Keleti and departing at 11:44 and 17:44, continuing to Belgrade. Coming from Belgrade to Budapest at 12:14 and 16:14, continuing to Vienna.
- IR trains will link Budapest to Kiskunhalas hourly. They will stop in every station between Budapest and Kunszentmiklós, continuing to Kiskunhalas stopping only at Szabadszállás, Kiskőrös, and Soltvadkert. Another service every two hours will depart Budapest and stop only at Pesterzsébet until Kunszentmiklós, then stopping at every station until Kelebia. The services will use a mix of Stadler FLIRT units and locomotive hauled passenger cars.

=== Modernization of the Serbian section ===
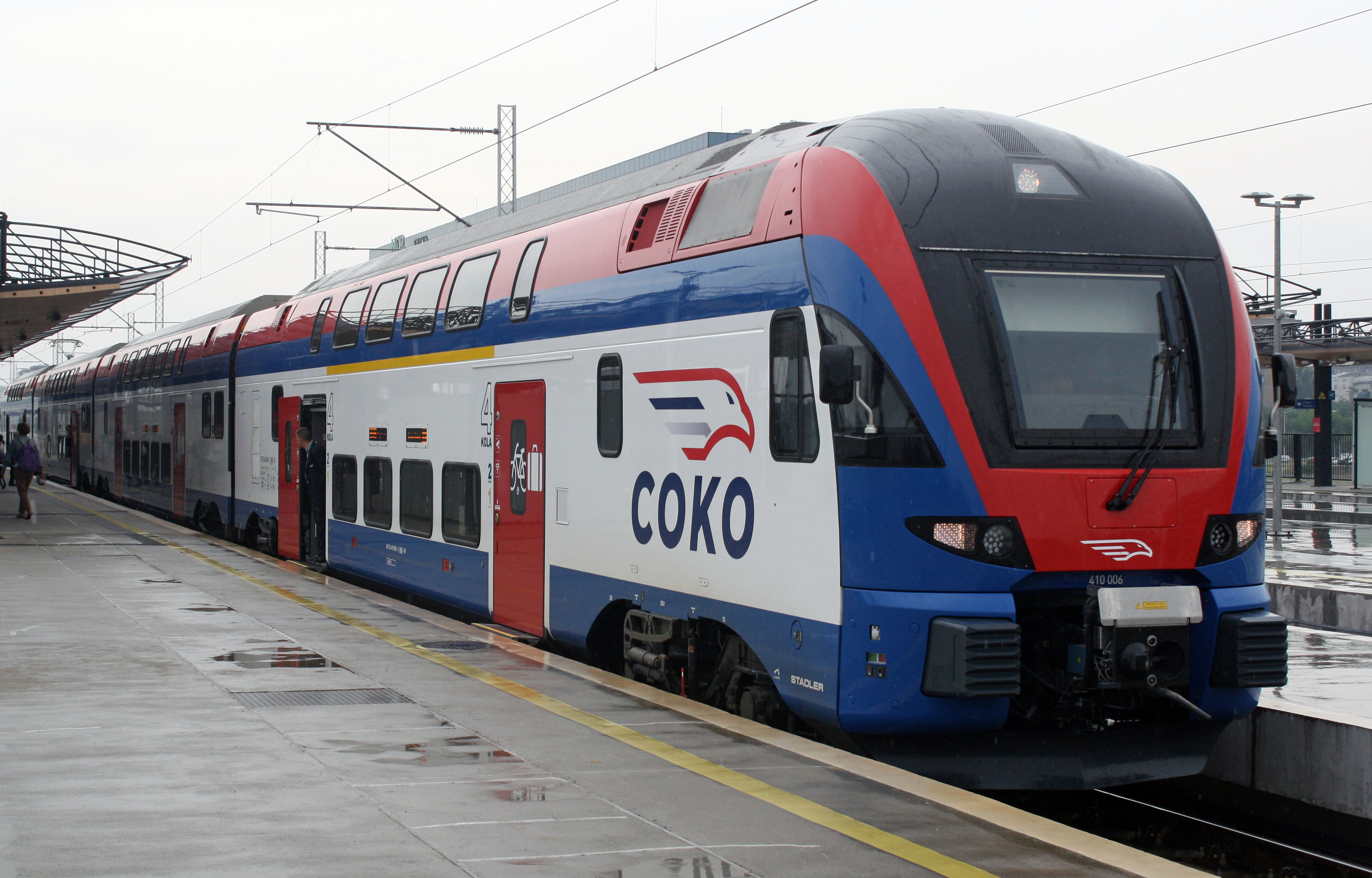
The Novi Sad–Subotica section is serviced by Serbian Railways as the Soko service using Stadler KISS trainsets.

In Serbia some 200 km (120 mi), one of the segments, the 34.5 km (21.4 mi)-long section Belgrade-Stara Pazova was reconstructed by China Communications Construction Company (CCCC) together with China Railways International (CRI), with the investment of $350.1 million, funded with a loan from the Export-Import Bank of China. The section Stara Pazova–Novi Sad was reconstructed by the Russian RZD International, financed with Russian credit. The reconstruction of the section Novi Sad–Subotica began in 2022, with estimated cost of €943 million, built by CCCC and a duration of 33 months, during which this section will be closed.

The construction of the railway line in Serbia started in September 2017, when the construction of the Čortanovci tunnel began. The 75 km railway for speed up to 200 km/h between Belgrade and Novi Sad opened on 19 March 2022 (this part was divided in two sections: as of 2018, the Belgrade–Stara Pazova 34.5 km section was planned to be finished in the end of 2020 and the Stara Pazova–Novi Sad 40.4 km section in November 2021). The construction of the 107.4 km section between Novi Sad and Subotica (Hungarian border) was started on 7 April 2022 and it was due to be completed by the end of November 2024, but the opening was delayed following the train station canopy collapse in Novi Sad and ensuing countrywide protests. On 8 October 2025 the "Soko" high-speed line between Belgrade (via Novi Sad) and Subotica opened and runs with 9 departures daily. Its maximum speed is 200 km/h and the 181,6 kilometres between Belgrade and Subotica are covered in 1h19 minutes.

== Bids of the Hungarian section ==
Only two consortia bid for the work. The winning consortium was announced June 2019. As with most public works since 2015 the government linked Hungarian entrepreneur, Lőrinc Mészáros won, with his company “RM International Zrt”, along with two Chinese companies: China Tiejiuju Engineering & Construction LLC., and China Railway Electrification Engineering Group(Hungary) Ltd.

== Criticism ==
Although the section between Budapest and Belgrade will allow a four-hour reduction in travel time, a further travel to the Chinese owned port of Piraeus was, as of 2017, still 2 to 4 days away by train from Belgrade.

While the Hungarian government classified its analysis of the economic viability of the project for 10 years, estimates by non-government-owned media in Hungary suggest a payoff horizon between 130 and 2400 years based on current and expected traffic on the line.

Furthermore, the project was criticized for a lack of transparency as the Hungarian government forbade the publication of the contract for the next 10 years. This has raised concerns about potential corruption of the most expensive project in the history of Hungarian railways. Additionally, the project is viewed by some independent media as a part of the Hungarian and Serbian governments' reorientation away from the EU towards China, with this large non-transparent investment potentially being a way to leverage Chinese influence in these countries.

== See also ==
- Budapest–Belgrade–Skopje–Athens railway
- Trans-European Transport Networks (TEN-T): Pan-European Corridor X.
