= Budapest–Belgrade–Skopje–Athens railway =

Proposed railway line in Europe

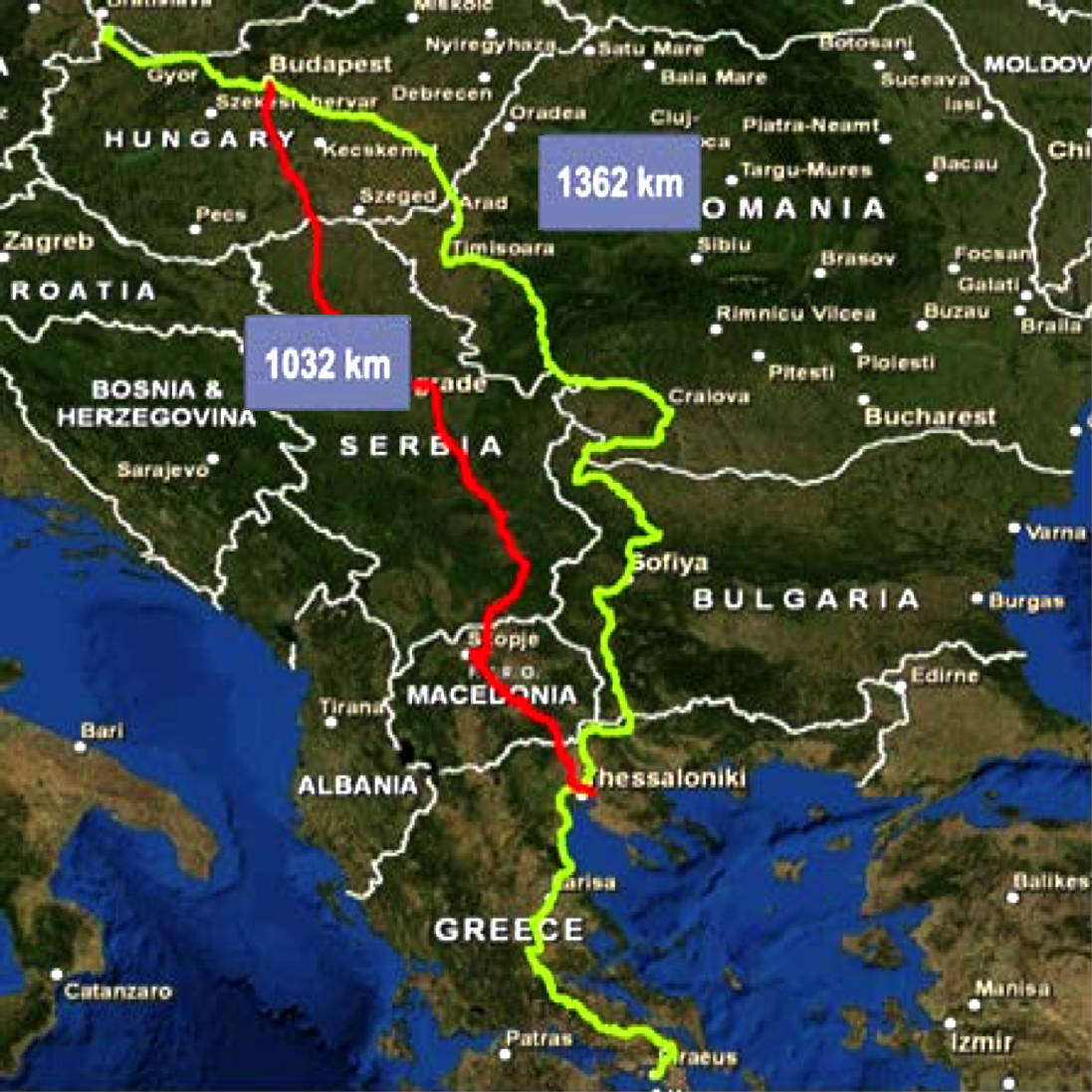
New proposal of the Athens–Budapest part of the "Balkan Route" / Corridor X (red) compared to the old planning (green)

The Budapest–Belgrade–Skopje–Athens railway, a China-CEE hallmark project (2014) of Beijing’s Belt and Road initiative, is a planned railway international connection in Central and Southeast Europe – between Budapest (Hungary), Belgrade (Serbia), Skopje (North Macedonia), Athens and its China-run port of Piraeus (Greece). Planned speed is up to 200 km/h (120 mph) depending on the sections: 160 km/h (99 mph) on the Hungarian section between Budapest and Serbia, 200 km/h (120 mph) between the Hungarian border and Belgrade and on most of the Belgrade-Niš section, while the current line between Thessaloniki and Athens is 200 km/h (120 mph) with upgrades to 160 km/h (99 mph) ongoing. The Chinese planners do not comment on the other tracks' realizable speeds. Originally, they spoke of up to 300 km/h (190 mph) throughout.

The first section, the Budapest–Belgrade railway – a $2.89 billion, 350 km (220 mi) high-speed rail line – should have been finished in two years, but is lagging behind due to an EU investigation into possible violations of its public tendering requirements.

== EU planning ==
In a 2012/13 EC report, Priority Project 22: Railway axis Athens–Sofia–Budapest–Vienna–Prague–Nuremberg/Dresden (PP22), the planners included their considerations of the Balkan route, which follows Pan-European Corridor X through Austria, Slovenia, Croatia, Serbia, North Macedonia and Greece (Thessaloniki–Skopje–Belgrade–Budapest/Zagreb–Ljubljana–Graz/Salzburg) and shortens the present Athens–Budapest route via Bulgaria and Romania by 330 km (210 mi). The total length is around 1,030 km (640 mi) compared to 1,362 km (846 mi) for the current southern Athens–Budapest part of PP22. Moreover, there were also a number of technical advantages of this proposed part of the Balkan route: 89% of it was electrified, as against 75% of the present PP22 route and the tracks were designed for higher maximum speeds overall. Nevertheless 64% of the planned line was still single track, compared to 54% of the present part of the PP22 route.

The planners appeal to the politicians: "In the medium term it may become necessary to tailor priorities in line with what is feasible, both for the European Union, the main provider of funding, and the Member States concerned. In this respect, Croatia’s accession to the European Union in July 2013 and discussions with the [r]epublics of the former Yugoslavia in connection with the review of TEN–T policy present a useful opportunity to develop rail links between south–east and central Europe via the western Balkans."

== Hungarian section (modernization) ==
The maximum speed of the track is designed to be up to 160 km/h (99 mph) on the Hungarian section.

The Hungarian section (152 km (94 mi)) of the project was announced in 2015 to cost HUF 472 billion and expected to be completed as of 2017–2018. Currently it is expected to cost HUF 949 billion ($3.6 billion) with interest.

In Hungary, the project is carried out by Kínai-Magyar Vasúti Nonprofit Zrt (Chinese-Hungarian Railway Nonprofit Ltd.), a Hungarian-Chinese joint venture of MÁV Zrt. with China Railway International Corporation (CRIC) and China Railway International Group (CRIG). According to one estimate, the works on this section could begin in 2021, as one year is needed for the public procurement procedures, and two years for the planning and negotiation phase. The investment is widely criticised as it will never recover its costs.

The construction of the Hungarian part of the railway, 152 km, was started in October 2021 and was completed in 2025, with cargo services starting in February of 2026, however as of October 2026, passenger services are yet to start, due to a delay in testing the ETCS 2 system.

== Serbian section (modernization) ==
The maximum speed of the track is designed to be up to 200 km/h (120 mph) on the Serbian section.

=== Subotica–Novi Sad ===
The reconstruction of the 108 km section between Novi Sad and Subotica (Hungarian border) was set to begin in 2019, with estimated cost of €943 million, built by CCCC and a duration of 33 months, requiring the closure of this section during the reconstruction time. It actually started on 7 April 2022 and is due to be completed for the end of 2024, but the opening was delayed following the train station canopy collapse in Novi Sad and ensuing countrywide protests.

The section between Novi Sad and Subotica opened for passenger use on October 8, 2025. 9 daily departures now link Belgrade and Subotica (Via. Novi Sad) in 1 hour and 19 minutes at an operational speed of 200 km/h.

=== Novi Sad–Belgrade ===
In Serbia, the 34.5 km (21.4 mi)-long Belgrade-Stara Pazova section was reconstructed by China Communications Construction Company (CCCC) together with China Railways International (CRI), with the investment of $350.1 million, funded with a loan from the Export-Import Bank of China. The section Stara Pazova-Novi Sad is being reconstructed by the Russian RZD International, financed with Russian credit. The section between Belgrade and Novi Sad was opened on 19 March 2022.

=== Belgrade–Niš ===
The Belgrade - Niš railway is following the direction of the central part of the Pan-European Corridor X. The reconstructed railway will be 228 km long. Trains will be able to reach speeds of up to 200 km/h on about 56% of the railway. The work that will be organized in three stages (Belgrade – Velika Plana, Velika Plana – Paraćin and Paraćin – Niš rail sections) and is expected to be completed in 2029. The first section, Stalać – Đunis (part of Paraćin – Niš), is expected to be completed in 2026.

In July 2020, President Aleksandar Vučić announced that the Belgrade-Niš railway would be 204 km long and would be completed by the end of 2023, with speeds of up to 200 km/h (124 mph), bringing Belgrade and Niš within 1 hour and 20 minutes of each other. In March 2023, he stated that the line will connect Belgrade and Niš in 1 hour and 40 minutes instead of 6 hours and a half as of 2023 (almost as long as the 8 hours from when the initial railway was built, in 1884).

On 10 May 2021, a loan agreement was signed in Belgrade for 102 million euros, co-financed by the French Development Agency and the World Bank at 51 million euros each, planned to be used for the complete modernization of the Belgrade-Niš railway. On 28 February 2023, a €2.2 billion financial package from the European Union was announced for the Belgrade-Niš railway, composed of up to €598 million in grants, as well as loans of €1.1 billion from the European Investment Bank (EIB) and €550 million from the European Bank for Reconstruction and Development (EBRD). On 30 March 2023, the Serbian Minister of Construction, Transport and Infrastructure, Goran Vesic, stated that the construction of the 228-kilometer high-speed Belgrade - Niš railway was "starting now".

== See also ==
- Trans-European Transport Networks (TEN-T): Pan-European Corridor X.
- Budapest–Belgrade railway
- Balkan Express (train) (Istanbul – Sofia – Belgrade)
- Bosphorus Express (Istanbul – Bucharest)
- Friendship Express (Istanbul – Thessaloniki)
