= List of bridges in Serbia =

This list of bridges in Serbia lists bridges of particular historical, scenic, architectural or engineering interest. Road and railway bridges, viaducts, aqueducts and footbridges are included.

== Historical and architectural interest bridges ==
	Name	Serbian	Distinction	Length	Type	Carries Crosses	Opened	Location	District	Ref.
1	Trajan's Bridge	Трајанов мост		1,135 m (3,724 ft)	Masonry; Wooden truss arches, masonry piers	Danube	105	Kladovo–Drobeta-Turnu Severin; 44°37′08.3″N 22°40′03.1″E	Bor District; Romania	
2	Uvac Bridge submerged in 1977	Мост на Увцу	Cultural Heritage site of Serbia		Masonry; Pointed arch	Uvac	16th century	Sjenica	Zlatibor	
3	White Bridge	Бели Мост	Cultural Heritage site of Serbia		Masonry; 1 arch	Vranje river	1844	Vranje; 42°33′43.7″N 21°53′53″E	Pčinja	
4	Most Ljubavi	Мост љубави	Known as the earliest mention of the love padlocks tradition			Vrnjačka River		Vrnjačka Banja; 43°37′14.7″N 20°53′37″E	Raška	
5	Dry Bridge	Мост на сувом	Does not span any physical obstacle, since the flow of the river under it was diverted		Suspension; Concrete	Footbridge	1962	Zrenjanin; 45°22′53.7″N 20°23′2.3″E	Central Banat	

== Major road and railway bridges ==
This table presents the structures with spans greater than 100 meters (non-exhaustive list).

	Name	Serbian	Span	Length	Type	Carries Crosses	Opened	Location	District	Ref.
1	Ada Bridge	Мост на Ади	376 m (1,234 ft)	967 m (3,173 ft)	Cable-stayed; Steel box girder deck, concrete pylon 376+200+50	Belgrade Inner City Semi-Ring Road; Belgrade Metro; Sava	2012	Belgrade; 44°47′47.9″N 20°25′33.2″E	Belgrade District	(Note: The length given only takes into account the main bridge, central span(s) and shore span(s), approach viaducts are not counted.)
2	Liberty Bridge, Novi Sad	Мост слободе	351 m (1,152 ft)	1,312 m (4,304 ft)	Cable-stayed; Steel box girder deck, steel pylons 2x60+351+2x60	Road bridge Danube	1981; 2005	Novi Sad; 45°14′0.2″N 19°51′1″E	South Bačka	
3	King Alexander Bridge destroyed in 1941	Мост краља Александра	262 m (860 ft)	475 m (1,558 ft)	Suspension; Steel box girder deck, steel pylons 75+262+75	Road bridge Trams in Belgrade; Sava	1934	Belgrade–Borča; 44°48′53.7″N 20°26′53.7″E	Belgrade District	
4	Branko's Bridge	Бранков мост	261 m (856 ft)	411 m (1,348 ft)	Box girder Steel; Twin bridges 75+261+75	Road bridge Sava	1956; 1979	Belgrade; 44°48′53.7″N 20°26′52.9″E	Belgrade District	
5	New Railway Bridge	Нови железнички мост	254 m (833 ft)	1,928 m (6,325 ft)	Cable-stayed; Steel box girder deck, steel pylons	Belgrade railway junction Sava	1979	Belgrade; 44°47′59.6″N 20°26′10.3″E	Belgrade District	
6	Gazela Bridge	Mост Газела	250 m (820 ft)	332 m (1,089 ft)	Box girder Steel; V-shaped legs	A3 motorway European route E70; European route E75; Sava	1971	Belgrade; 44°48′9.1″N 20°26′28.2″E	Belgrade District	
7	Railway–Road Bridge across the Danube	Железничко-друмски мост преко Дунава	219 m (719 ft)	474 m (1,555 ft)	Arch; Steel tied arch Bow-string bridge 219+177	Road bridge Railway bridge Danube	2018	Novi Sad; 45°15′43.0″N 19°51′36.9″E	South Bačka	
8	Žeželj Bridge destroyed in 1999	Жежељев мост	211 m (692 ft)	466 m (1,529 ft)	Arch; Concrete through arch 211+165	Road bridge Railway bridge Danube	1961	Novi Sad; 45°15′42.7″N 19°51′37.6″E	South Bačka	
9	Beška Bridge	Мост код Бешке	210 m (690 ft)	2,250 m (7,380 ft)	Box girder Prestressed concrete Twin bridges 105+210+105	A1 motorway European route E75; Danube	1975; 2011	Beška; 45°10′9.3″N 20°4′47.9″E	Srem	
10	Ostružnica Bridge	Друмски мост код Остружнице	198 m (650 ft)	1,969 m (6,460 ft)	Box girder Steel; Twin bridges 99+198+99	A1 motorway Belgrade bypass European route E75; Sava	1999; 2004; 2020	Ostružnica; 44°44′33.7″N 20°19′05.5″E	Belgrade District	
11	Gazivode Bridge	Газиводе мост	195 m (640 ft)	323 m (1,060 ft)	Arch; Steel through arch	Road bridge Gazivoda Lake; Ibar (river)	1989	Vitkoviće–Brnjak; 42°58′09.9″N 20°32′19.3″E	Raška; Kosovo	
12	Šabac Railway Bridge	Стари мост (Шабац)	181 m (594 ft)	680 m (2,230 ft)	Truss; Steel; 181+4x125	Road bridge Railway bridge Sava	1934	Šabac–Klenak; 44°46′36.8″N 19°42′00.2″E	Mačva; Srem	
13	Sremska Mitrovica Road Bridge		180 m (590 ft)	739 m (2,425 ft)	Box girder Steel	State Road 20; Sava		Sremska Mitrovica; 44°57′34.8″N 19°37′53.1″E	Srem	
14	Pupin Bridge	Пупинов мост	172 m (564 ft)	1,507 m (4,944 ft)	Box girder Prestressed concrete Twin bridges	Road bridge Danube	2014	Belgrade–Borča; 44°51′53″N 20°22′53″E	Belgrade District	
15	Kovin Bridge	Ковински мост	171 m (561 ft)	1,435 m (4,708 ft)	Box girder Steel; 109+171+109	Danube	1976	Smederevo–Kovin; 44°41′41.1″N 20°57′17.1″E	Podunavlje; South Banat	
16	51st Division Bridge	Мост 51. дивизије	170 m (560 ft)	636 m (2,087 ft)	Box girder Steel; 96+170+96	State Road 16; Danube	1974	Bezdan–Batina; 45°50′38.6″N 18°51′26.9″E	West Bačka; Croatia	
17	Ada Tisza River Bridge		168 m (551 ft)	1,000 m (3,300 ft)	Cable-stayed; Steel girder deck, concrete pylon 168+74	Road bridge Tisza	2010	Ada; 45°47′6.8″N 20°8′47.4″E	North Banat	
18	Pančevo Bridge	Панчевачки мост	162 m (531 ft)(x3)	1,526 m (5,007 ft)	Truss; Steel; 161+3x162+161	European route E70; Railway bridge Danube	1961	Belgrade–Borča; 44°49′41.9″N 20°29′30.5″E	Belgrade District	
19	Ilok–Bačka Palanka Bridge	Мост Илок — Бачка Паланка	160 m (520 ft)	725 m (2,379 ft)	Box girder Steel; 100+160+100	D2 road Danube	1974; 2002	Bačka Palanka–Ilok; 45°13′58.0″N 19°24′06.2″E	South Bačka; Croatia	
20	Šabac Road Bridge	Нови мост (Шабац)	160 m (520 ft)	628 m (2,060 ft)	Box girder Steel	State Road 21; Sava		Šabac–Klenak; 44°45′29.9″N 19°42′53.0″E	Mačva; Srem	
21	Erdut–Bogojevo Road Bridge		155 m (509 ft)	640 m (2,100 ft)	Box girder Steel; 100+155+100	State Road 17; Danube	1980	Bogojevo–Erdut; 45°31′28.5″N 19°05′05.2″E	West Bačka; Croatia	
22	Šabac Motorway Bridge		155 m (509 ft)	1,361 m (4,465 ft)	Box girder Prestressed concrete Twin bridges	Ruma-Šabac motorway Sava	2022	Šabac–Klenak; 44°48′25.3″N 19°41′39.6″E	Mačva; Srem	
23	Novi Kneževac Bridge	Нови Кнежевац мост	154 m (505 ft)	400 m (1,300 ft)	Suspension; Steel girder deck, steel pylons 34+154+34	State Road 13; Tisza		Novi Kneževac; 46°2′42.2″N 20°5′6.8″E	North Banat	
24	Titel Road Bidge	Друмско мост Тител	154 m (505 ft)		Arch; Concrete tied arch Bow-string bridge	State Road 129; Tisza		Titel; 45°11′51.8″N 20°18′47.2″E	South Bačka	
25	Titel Railway Bidge	железнички мост Тител	154 m (505 ft)		Arch; Steel tied arch Bow-string bridge	Railway bridge Tisza		Titel; 45°11′51.1″N 20°18′47.2″E	South Bačka	
26	Rača Bridge	Мост у Рачи	150 m (490 ft)	400 m (1,300 ft)	Truss; Steel; 125+150+125	Railway bridge Sava	1934	Sremska Rača–Brodac Donji; 44°54′37.9″N 19°17′49″E	Srem; Bosnia and Herzegovina	
27	Bridge of Europe (Sava)		150 m (490 ft)	400 m (1,300 ft)	Box girder Steel; 125+150+125	State Road 19; Sava	2010	Sremska Rača–Brodac Donji; 44°54′34.7″N 19°17′48.7″E	Srem; Bosnia and Herzegovina	
28	Sava River Bridge (Sremska Raca) under construction		150 m (490 ft)	1,320 m (4,330 ft)	Box girder Steel; Twin bridges 90+150+90	Sarajevo-Belgrade Motorway; Sava		Sremska Rača–Brodac Donji; 44°54′34.7″N 19°17′52.3″E	Srem; Bosnia and Herzegovina	

== Other bridges ==
This table presents the structures with spans greater than 100 meters (non-exhaustive list).

	Name	Serbian	Span	Length	Type	Carries Crosses	Opened	Location	District	Ref.
1	Kovin Pipeline South Bridge		480 m (1,570 ft)	866 m (2,841 ft)	Suspension; Steel; 193+480+193	Pipeline bridge Danube	1972	Smederevo–Kovin; 44°41′21.1″N 20°56′44.5″E	Podunavlje; South Banat	
2	Saint Irinej Bridge	Мост св. Иринеја	192 m (630 ft)	297 m (974 ft)	Cable-stayed; Steel box girder deck, concrete pylons 35+192+35	Footbridge; Sava	1993	Sremska Mitrovica; 44°57′57.6″N 19°36′4.7″E	Srem	

== Notes and references ==
- Notes
- Nicolas Janberg. "International Database for Civil and Structural Engineering". Structurae.com.
- Others references

== See also ==
- List of crossings of the Danube
- Bridges of Belgrade
- Transport in Serbia
- Roads in Serbia
- Serbian Railways
- Geography of Serbia
