= Bridges of Belgrade =

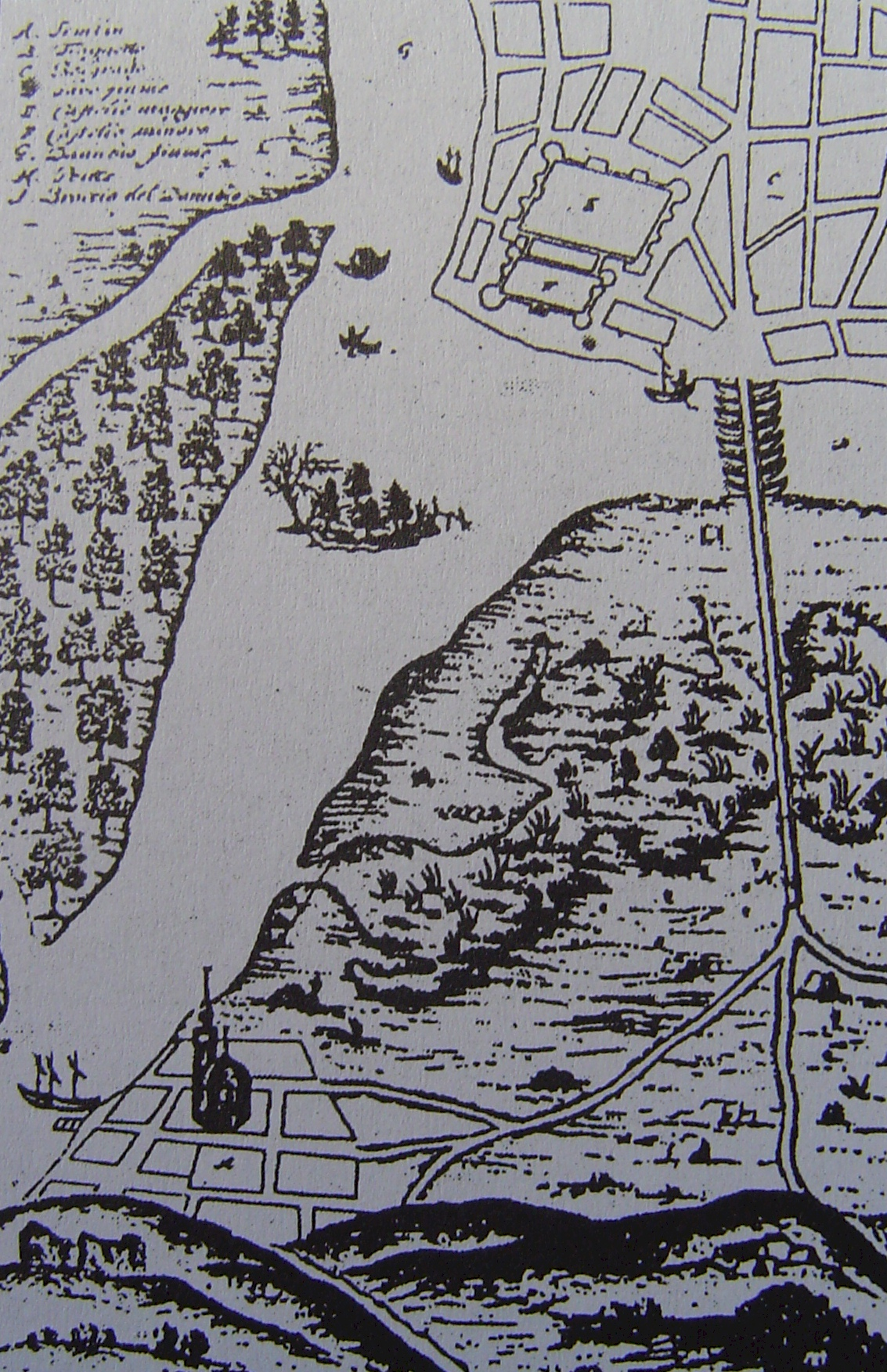
1688 map of Zemun and Belgrade, showing a pontoon bridge

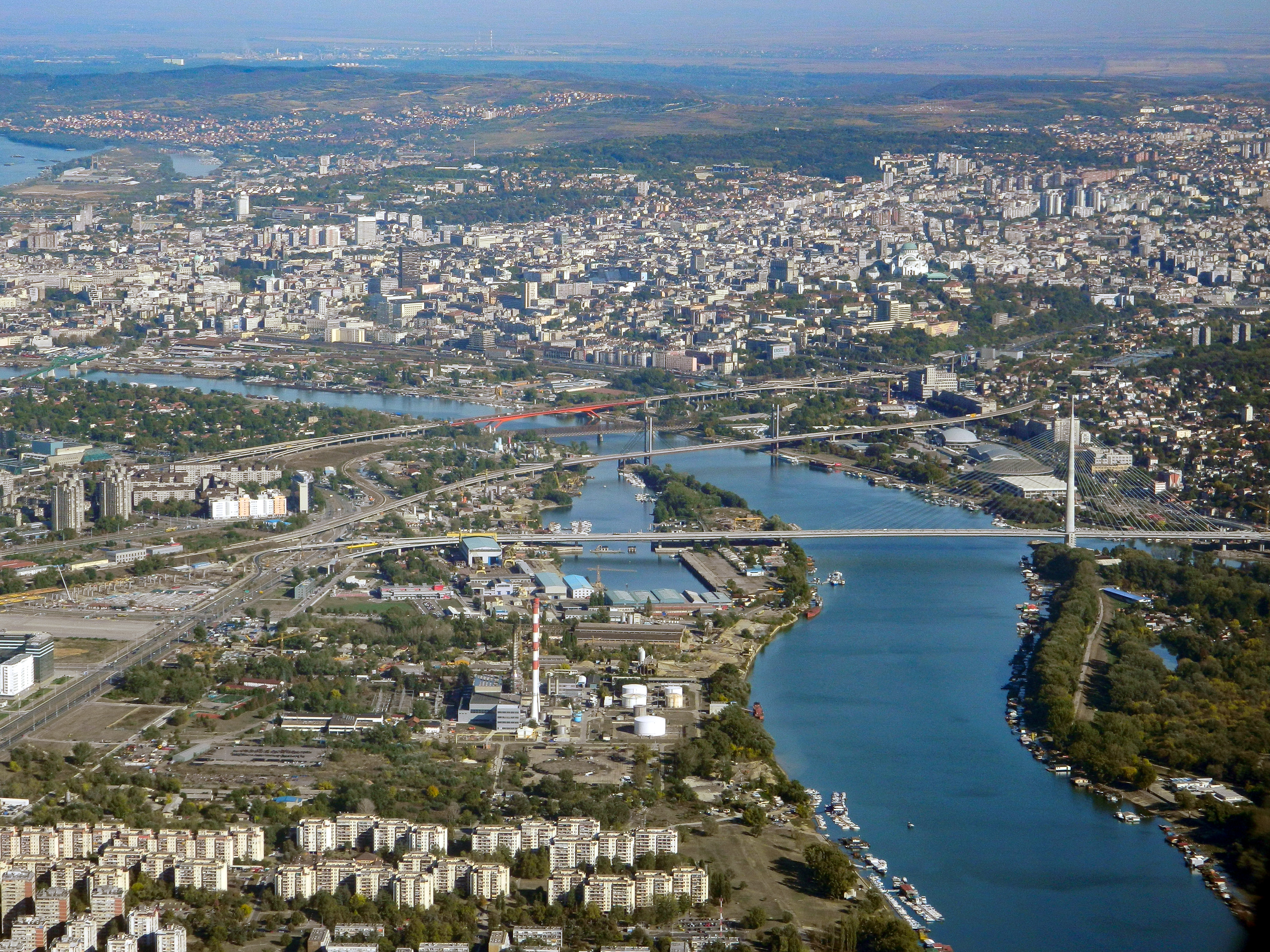
Aerial view of the Sava river, showing five out of six bridges in the urban section of the city

Belgrade, the capital of Serbia, is located on two major rivers, the Danube and the Sava which are spanned by 11 bridges in total.

== Introduction ==
The Greek historian Zosimus mentions the bridge in Belgrade (at that time, Singidunum) already in the 5th century, which is the oldest historical mention of any bridges in the city. Other historical records observe other bridges, from the Byzantine and later periods, like in 1521, 1595, 1688 or 1717, but they were all temporary, pontoon bridges, constructed solely for the purpose of conquering the city during the numerous battles and sieges of Belgrade through history.

In 1521, Karaca Pasha, military commander of the Ottoman sultan Suleiman the Magnificent built a pontoon bridge across the Sava. The Ottoman first conquered less fortified city of Zemun in Syrmia, and then built the bridge back to Belgrade. Foreign chroniclers were spreading news of the Ottomans "piling up" the bridge materials in Belgrade, and claimed the bridges were built in 1529, 1532 and 1566, but this can't be confirmed. They also probably were only temporary, military pontoon bridges. Ottoman traveler Evliya Çelebi, who visited Belgrade in the 1660s, mentioned a former bridge, built in 1526 or 1529.

Regarding the construction, the craftsmen were from Dubrovnik, while the workforce (corvée labor) was made of Serbs and Jews. In 1595 Ottomans built a pontoon over the Danube, near the village of Višnjica. A bridge across the Sava was described in 1608, as being 4,000 paces long, of which 800 paces was above the river. Part of the bridge was mobile, serving as a bascule bridge, to allow the river transport. Another bridge across the Sava was mentioned in 1662. Built by 1,500 workers, it was 15 paces wide and 3,380 paces long. There may be another bridge at the same time, as this one was referred to as the "New Bridge". The bridge had poles, decorated with maces, battle axes, and crescent moons. Çelebi crossed the bridge in 1663, estimating it as having 400 paces across the river, and additional 4,000 paces across the swamps. It was held by 50 ships.

In the late 17th century, another bridge across the Sava's Ada Ciganlija island was also mentioned. Sources mention the pontoon bridge across the Danube in 1698. The bridge in 1717 was built on the orders of the Austrian commander Prince Eugene of Savoy. The chronicles mention no less than 10 pontoon bridges on the location of the modern Branko's Bridge - 5 Austrian and 5 Ottoman.

== Types ==
They can be categorized in several ways:

a) 10 across the Sava, 2 across the Danube;
b) 8 road bridges, 3 railway and 1 combined;
c) 7 urban, 4 suburban and 1 combined;

== Bridges by water body ==
=== Sava ===
==== 1884 - Old Railroad Bridge ====
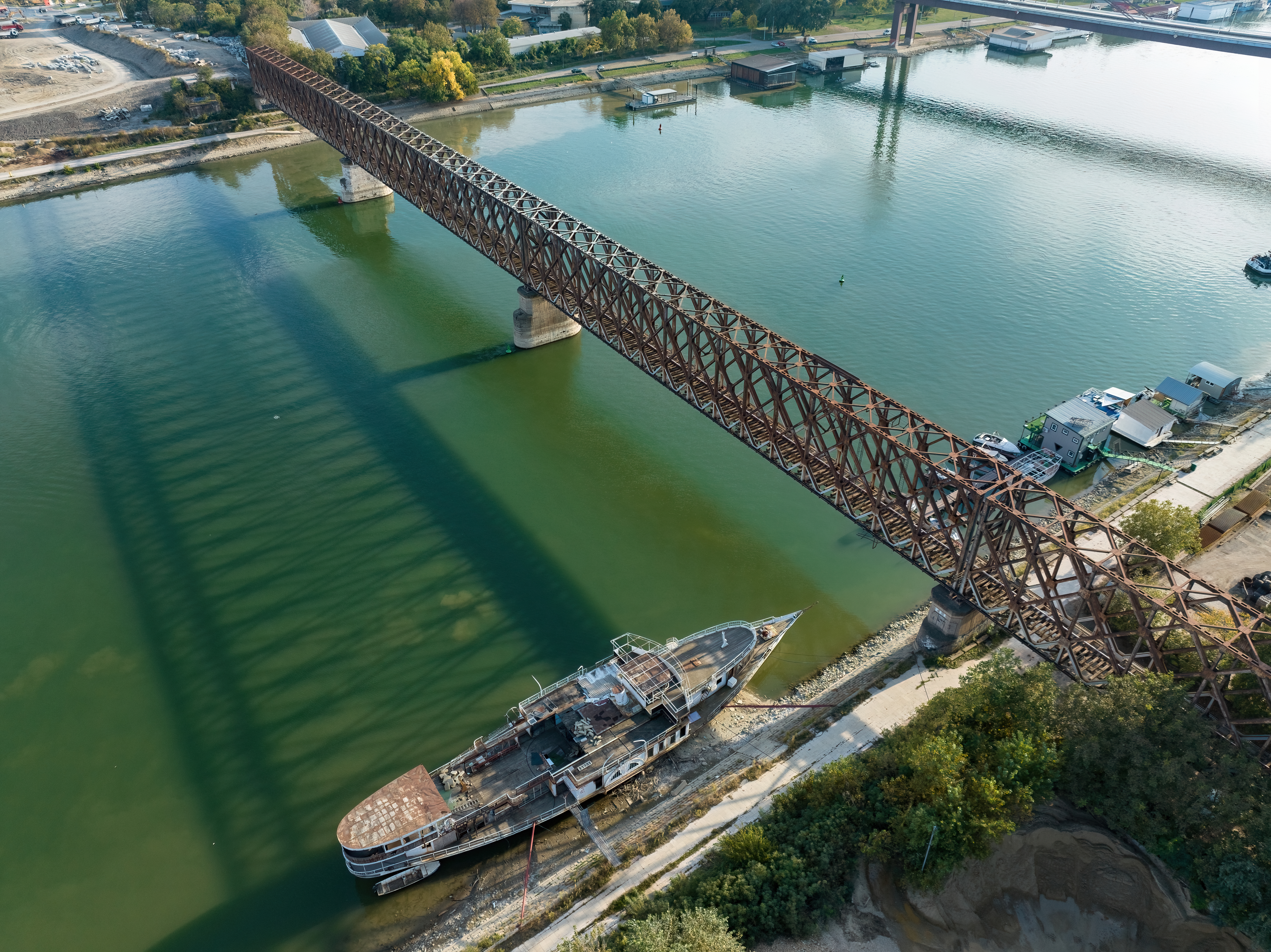
Bridge in 2023

Old Railroad Bridge (Serbian: Стари железнички мост) was built within the project of constructing the first railway in Serbia. It was built on a French concession which included the construction of the Belgrade–Niš railway, the railway bridge over the Sava and a railway which will connect Belgrade to Zemun, at the time, the border town of Austria-Hungary. It was demolished in both World Wars and the present construction was placed after the World War II ended. As the only connection between Serbia and the Austria-Hungary, who already positioned its army near the bridge, it was demolished by the Serbian army on 29 July 1914. It was reconstructed in 1919. When Germany attacked Yugoslavia on 6 April 1941, the High Command decided to demolish all three existing bridges in Belgrade, including the railway bridge. It was reconstructed again in 1945, funded by the war reparations. Though projected as a temporary link in 1945, the bridge was reconstructed in 1986, when the tracks were replaced. Minor repairs on the bridge have been done in 1995 and 1996. It was the only bridge in Belgrade until 1934. Also, it was the only railway bridge until 1935 and the only one across the Sava until 1979 when the New Railroad Bridge was open.

Type: a) Sava; b) railway; c) urban;

==== 1942 - Old Sava Bridge ====
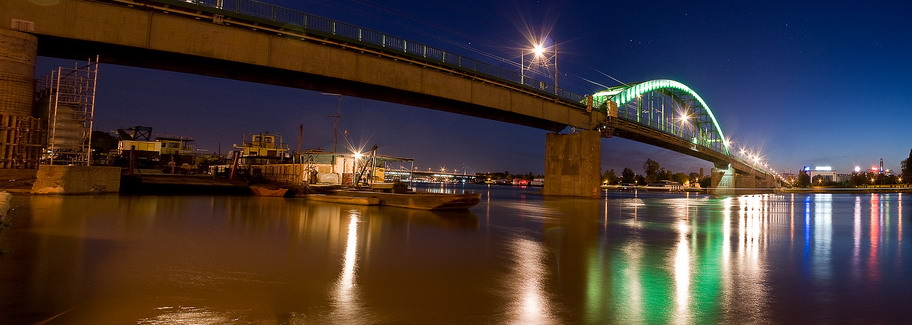

Old Sava Bridge (Стари савски мост) was built during the German occupation. The construction of the bridge was installed over the Tisa river near Žabalj, but the demolition of the King Alexander Bridge, led to the installation of the construction over the eight pillars on the Sava river. It was cut in pieces and transferred to Belgrade. It was the only big European bridge that was not demolished during the German withdrawals. The bridge had a wooden driveway until 1964, when the planners suggested the reconstruction of the bridge to the mayor Branko Pešić. After a five-year reconstruction a new concrete panel was placed in 1969. After opting against the construction of metro, despite developing the project for over a decade, in 1984 the tramway tracks were laid over the bridge and the concrete panel was replaced with the steel one. In March 2016, mayor of Belgrade Siniša Mali announced the massive reconstruction of the bridge, slated to begin in the late 2017. He named the Tehran's Tabiat Bridge as an inspiration. However, in May 2017, after the city publicized the project papers, it was obvious that all the time they wanted to demolish the bridge completely and build a new one but the old bridge will not be demolished. Instead it will be moved to another location which is still not chosen, as a pedestrian bridge.

Type: a) Sava; b) road; c) urban;

==== 1953 - Ostružnica Railroad Bridge ====
Ostružnica Railroad Bridge (Остружнички железнички мост) was built in order to move the transport of toxic and explosive materials from downtown Belgrade. Built in 1953, it was damaged by NATO during the bombing of Serbia in 1999. The 658 m (2,159 ft) long bridge was repaired and open on 15 September 2006.

Type: a) Sava; b) railway; c) suburban;

==== 1956 - Branko's Bridge ====
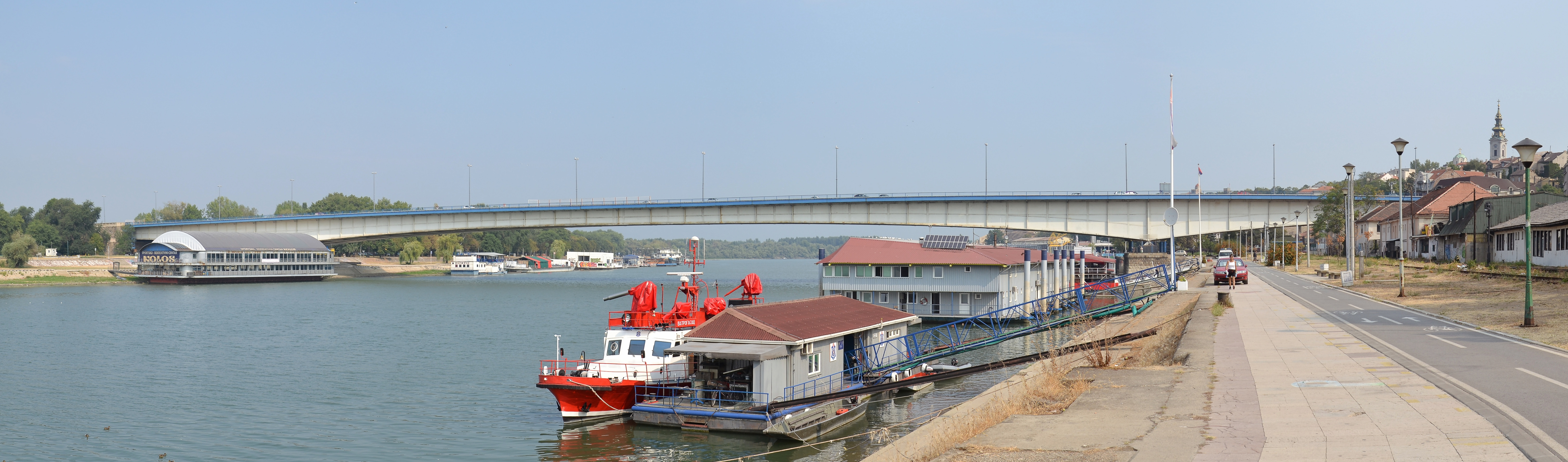

Branko's Bridge (Бранков мост) replaced in 1956 the former chain-stayed King Alexander Bridge, which was operational from 1934 to 1941. The bridge actually uses lower parts of the former bridge's pylons as outer constraints for its two secondary spans. After the World War II, in the 1950s, the general idea was that trolleybuses should take over the major role in the public transportation. Line to Zemun was opened in 1956, and in time three lines over the bridge were formed: Line 14 – Zeleni Venac-Gornji Grad (Zemun) (which was considered a successor line to the pre-war tram line), Line 15 – Zeleni Venac-Novi Grad (Zemun) and Line 16 – Zeleni Venac-Pohorska, New Belgrade. The lines were closed in 1973. The bridge gained an infamous reputation as the suicide bridge. Some 40 people try to commit suicide jumping of the Branko's Bridge every year.

Type: a) Sava; b) road; c) urban;

==== 1970 - Gazela Bridge ====
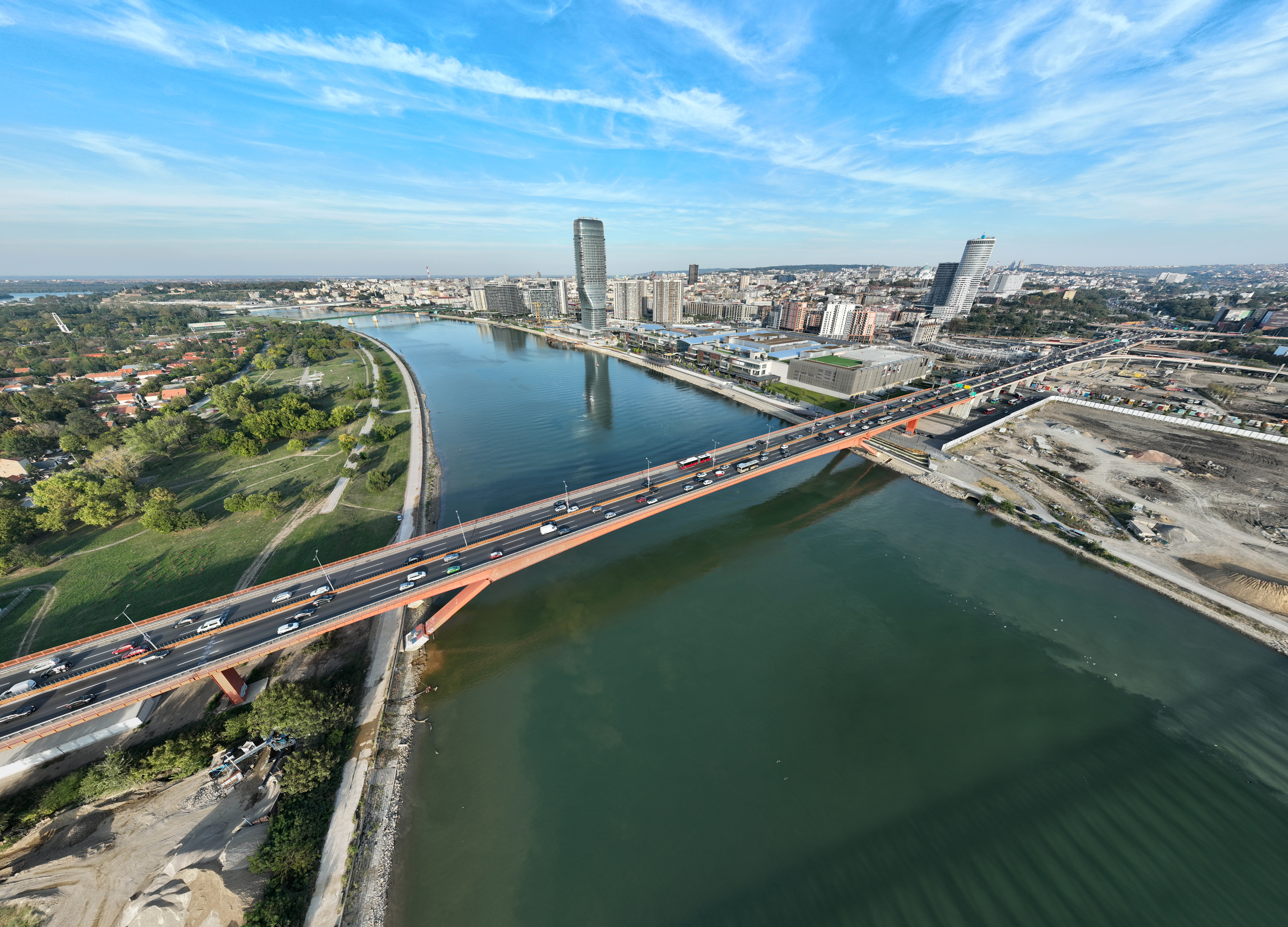

Gazela Bridge (Мост Газела) is the most important, central bridge in the city, the main connection between downtown Belgrade and New Belgrade, carrying the transit traffic on E70 and E75 highways. Daily traffic exceeds 165,000 vehicles. It was built from 1966 to 1970. Immediately after the opening in 1970, a defect was noticed. Due to the miscalculations, the metallic construction began to depress in the middle of the bridge. By the 2010 reconstruction, it became visible both by watching the bridge from the side or crossing it. In order to alleviate the problem, on the metallic sections of the bridge, the concrete shoulders were replaced with the lighter, metallic ones. After a long debate, which lasted for years, on the condition of the bridge, a major reconstruction ensued in 2010-11. After the reconstruction, city officials stated the bridge would be able to handle 200,000 vehicles daily for the next 40 years. However, the bridge is still overloaded, despite the significant relief when the new Ada Bridge was opened for traffic on 1 January 2012. Additional relief is expected when the Belgrade bypass is completed.

Type: a) Sava; b) road; c) urban;

==== 1979 - New Railroad Bridge ====
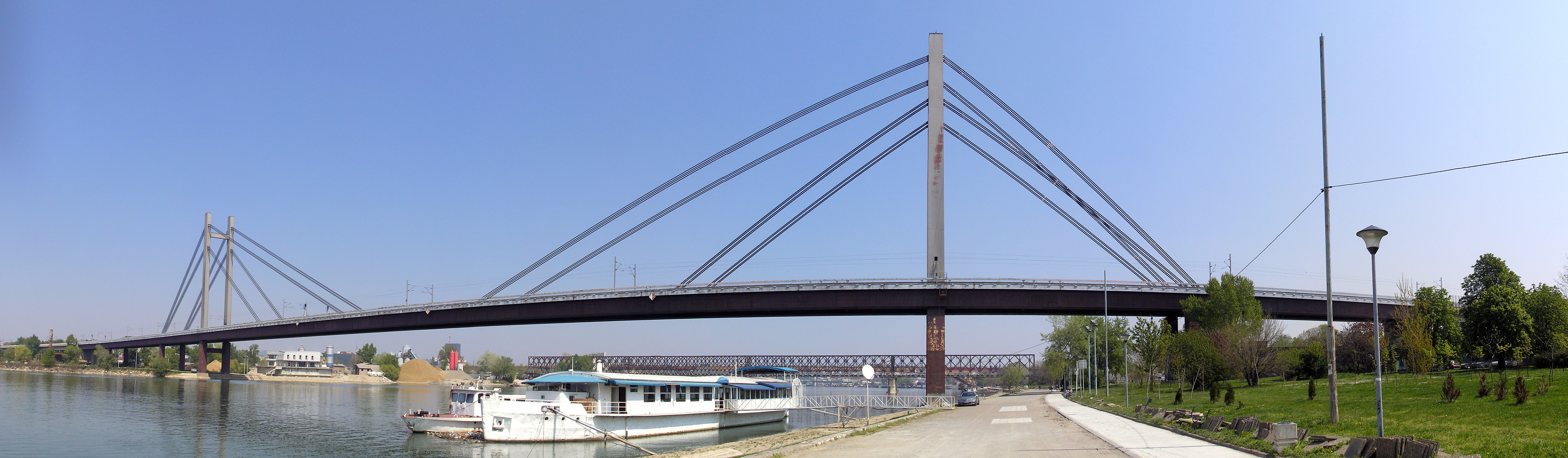

New Railroad Bridge (Нови желеѕнички мост) is a cable-stayed bridge, the second railway bridge across the Sava in the urban section of Belgrade. The construction of the bridge began in 1975 and it was completed and opened for traffic in 1979. The bridge was built as a part of the projected Belgrade railway junction and it directly connects New Belgrade with the, still unfinished, Belgrade Centre railway station in the neighborhood of Prokop. Designed by Nikola Hajdin, it was the first bridge in Europe to use cable-stayed girder system.

Type: a) Sava; b) railway; c) urban;

==== 1998 - Ostružnica Bridge ====
Ostružnica Bridge (Остружнички мост) is a three-lane semi-highway girder bridge carrying the Belgrade bypass. It was constructed from 1990 to 1998. The bridge was bombed by NATO during the Kosovo War in 1999 and fully reconstructed by 2004. The additional, parallel three-lane twin bridge was officially opened on 14 June 2020.

Type: a) Sava; b) road; c) suburban;

==== 2011 - Obrenovac-Surčin Bridge ====
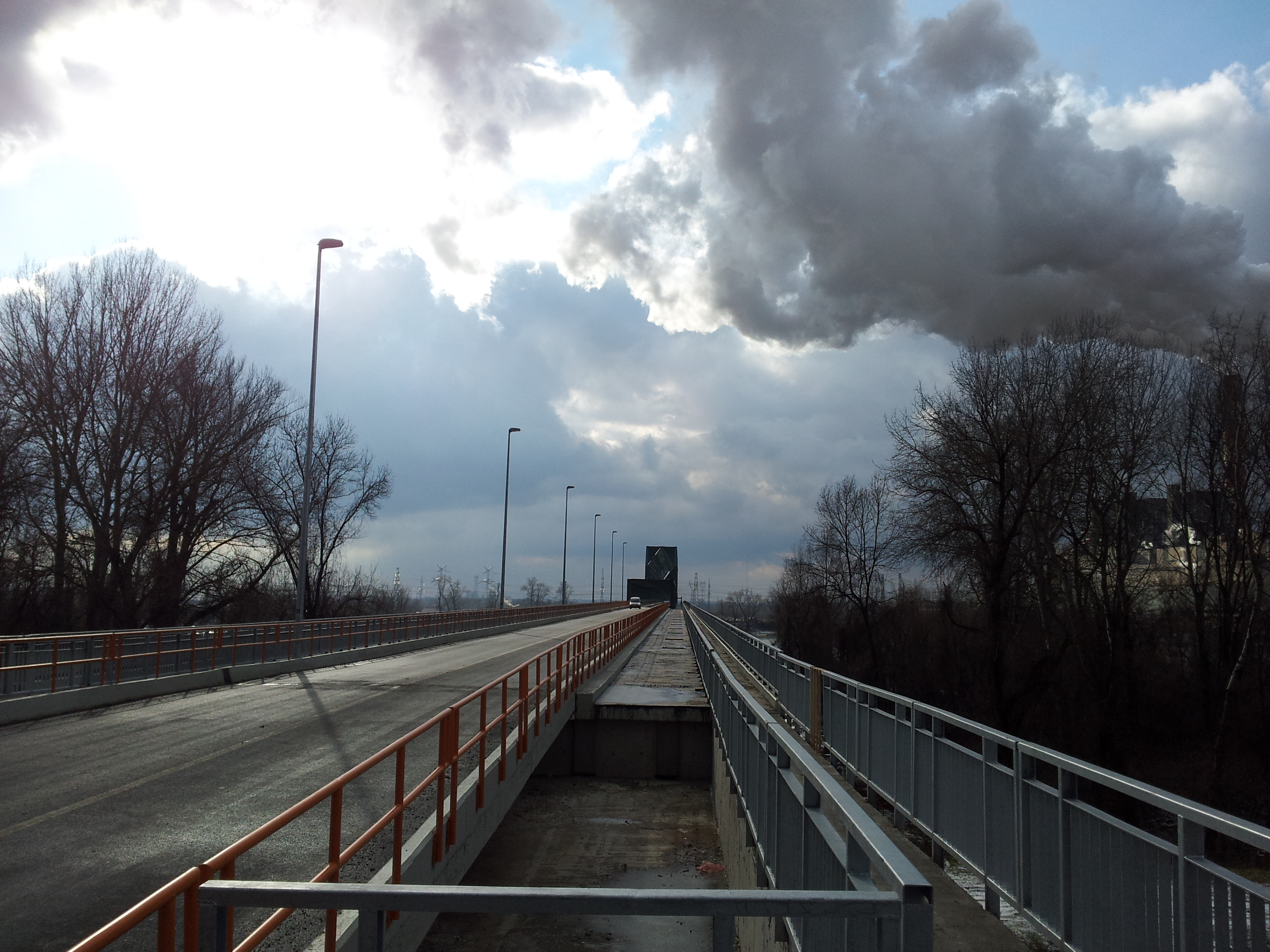

Obrenovac-Surčin Bridge (Мост Обреновац-Сурчин) was built from 1994 to 2011. It was originally projected as the carrier for the district heating pipeline, hence the closeness to the power plant.), It was supposed to connect the TPP Nikola Tesla plant with New Belgrade. In 1997. the project was changed to include the possibility of transporting tanks and other military technics and then the idea was expanded to include the regular traffic. Due to the financial constraints, the works were halted in 1998 and the NATO bombing in 1999 pushed this project out of any future plans as so much other infrastructure had to be repaired. In the next years nothing new was done as works included only the maintenance of the already placed steel construction and the reparation of one of the pillars which was damaged by the barge. The idea resurfaced in 2006 when the discussions were held on the profitability of the heating pipeline and eventually the pipeline idea was dropped. Tentative works on further building began in April 2010 and the full blown construction ensued in 2011. The bridge was opened on 1 December 2011.

Type: a) Sava; b) road; c) suburban;

==== 2012 - Ada Bridge ====
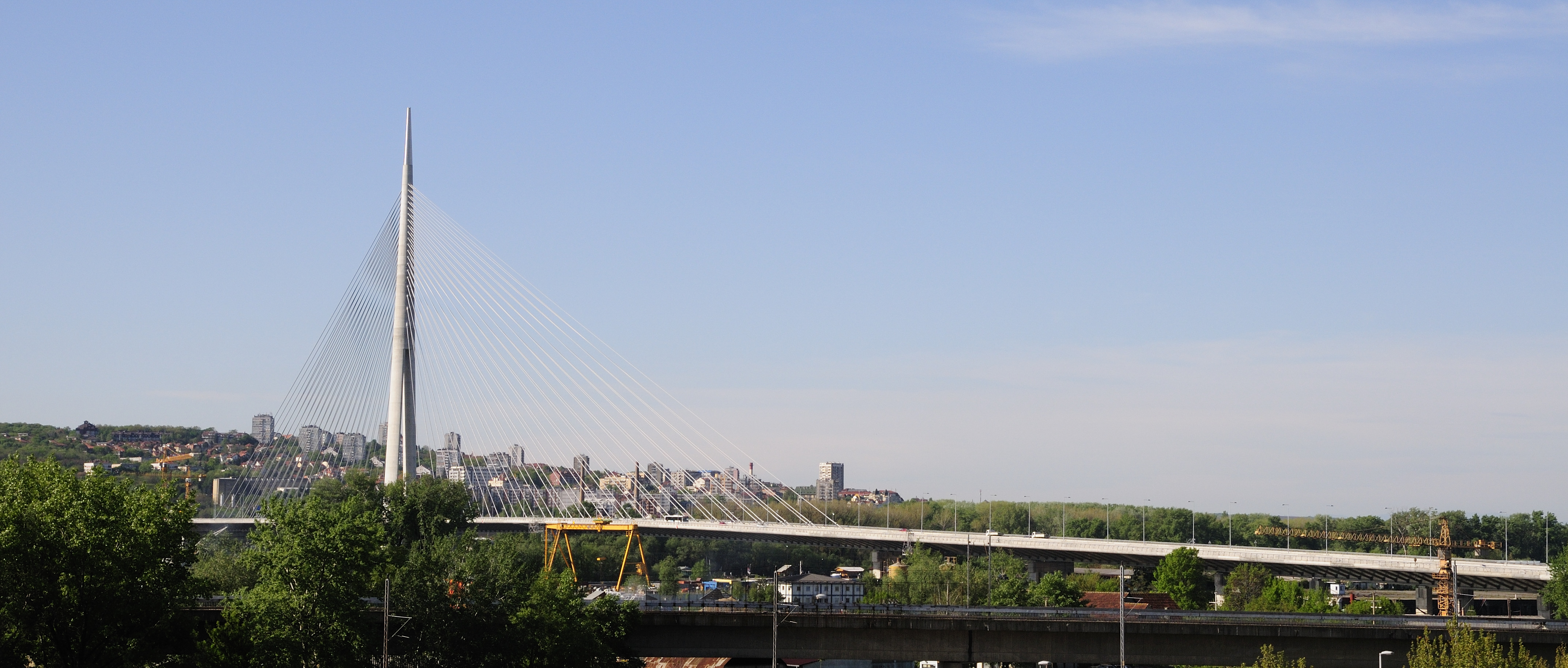

Ada Bridge (Мост на Ади) is a cable-stayed bridge which crosses the tip of Ada Ciganlija island, connecting the municipalities of Čukarica and New Belgrade. The bridge pylon is located on the tip of the island, which has been reinforced with large amounts of concrete and has been slightly enlarged to provide stronger foundations. Construction began in 2008, and the bridge was opened on 1 January 2012. Component parts of the deck were manufactured in China and delivered in transportable units on a sea and river-route via Rotterdam through the Rhine–Main–Danube Canal to the pre-assembly yard next to the construction site at Mala Ciganlija in Belgrade. The bridge is designed to significantly reduce traffic passing through the city center and the Gazela Bridge. It is planned to be part of the future Belgrade Inner City Semi-Ring Road. It has three road lanes and a tram (light rail) track in each direction. The bridge was featured in the fifth episode, season nine of the Discovery Channel documentary television series Build It Bigger.

Type: a) Sava; b) road; c) urban;

==== 2019 - Obrenovac-Surčin Bridge (A2 motorway) ====
Obrenovac-Surčin Bridge on the A2 motorway, was in construction since 2017. Preparatory works began on 12 February and construction started on 23 May. The bridge crosses not only the Sava, but also its tributary Kolubara. This section of the A2 motorway and the access roads to the bridge were in construction since 1 March 2017. The construction company was China Communications Construction. The bridge was ceremonially opened for traffic, with the adjoining Obrenovac-Surčin section of the motorway, on 17 December 2019.

Type: a) Sava; b) road; c) suburban;

=== Danube ===
==== 1946 - Pančevo Bridge ====
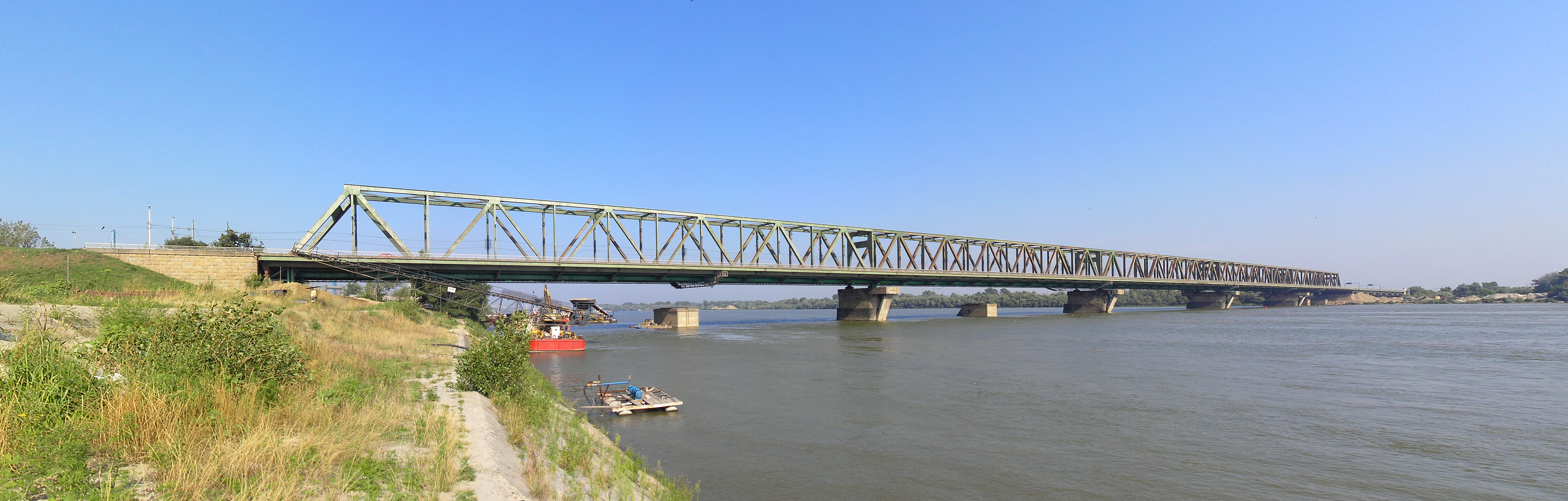

Pančevo Bridge (Панчевачки мост) replaced in 1946 the former Bridge of King Peter II, which was built in 1935 and completely destroyed in 1944. It is a combined road/railway bridge. Rebuilding began in 1945, upstream from the remnants of the destroyed supporting piers. Plans were drawn up by the Soviet engineers of the Red Army's technical troops. Soviet leader Joseph Stalin's orders were that they should build a provisory crossing, but Yugoslav prime minister Josip Broz Tito convinced him that a proper bridge should be built. On 7 November 1946, the first train passed over the new bridge and regular road traffic started three weeks later, on 29 November. Originally, it was named the Bridge of the Red Army (Most Crvene Armije). It was damaged in the explosion of the Russian tanker ships convoy in 1963. Not counting the Đerdap dams on the Romanian border, Pančevo Bridge was the only bridge over the Danube in Serbia that was not destroyed by NATO forces during the bombing of Serbia in 1999. Until the opening of the Pupin Bridge in 2015, it was the only Belgrade's bridge over the Danube.

Type: a) Danube; b) road/railway; c) urban;

==== 2015 - Pupin Bridge ====
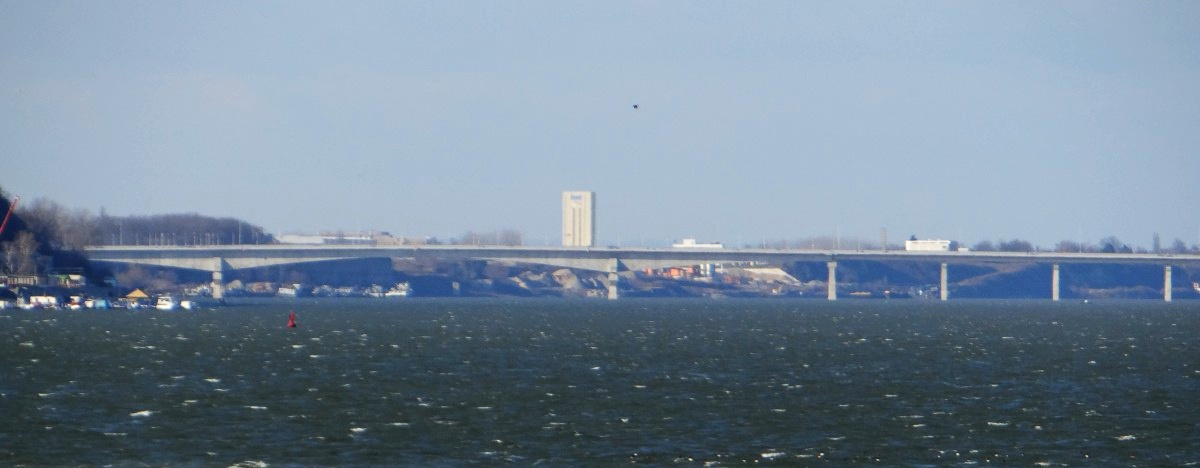

Pupin Bridge (Пупинов мост) connects the neighborhood of Zemun and the suburb of Borča. The bridge construction was a joint venture of the Serbian and Chinese state capital (Exim Bank of China) and, with €170 million, it was China's first big infrastructure investment on the European continent. Construction began in July 2011 and the bridge was opened on 18 December 2014. Due to the origin of the investors, even before the construction began, the bridge was colloquially called "Chinese bridge". During the construction, its tentative name was Zemun–Borča bridge, but later it got named after scientist and inventor Mihajlo Pupin. It has 6 lanes and 2 pedestrian-bicycle paths and relieved a congestions on the only previously existing bridge, Pančevo Bridge, which was overloaded for decades. The Borča section is still not urbanized and the construction of the bridge prompted some ideas for the future projects in the area. They include the future Chinese industrial park next to the bridge and a controversial project of the new Belgrade port north of the bridge, in the Beljarica wetland known as the Belgrade Amazonia, which caused protest from the environmentalist and general public.

Type: a) Danube; b) road; c) urban (Zemun)/suburban (Borča);

== Former bridges ==
=== 1688–1691 - Long Bridge ===
Long Bridge (Дуги мост) was constructed further to the south from the city, near the village of Ostružnica on Šumadija side of the river. As the Syrmian side across the Sava was a vast marsh at the time (modern New Belgrade), the bridge didn't stop at the bank but continued for some length above the swamp. Because of that, the people also called it the Bridge above the marsh (Most preko močvare). The Long Bridge was built by the Austrians to help them conquer Belgrade from the Ottomans during the 1688 Siege of Belgrade. According to the records, a seasoned Belgrade master craftsman Đorđević "in only one month, with the help of his 400 workers, built the Long Bridge, using 2,000 tree trunks, 1,100 wooden piles, 15,500 bundles of palings and 12,000 palisade pickets." If not before, the bridge had to be demolished by 1691 when the Ottomans reconquered Belgrade. The Long Bridge is the first permanent bridge in Belgrade history. Right next to it, bit closer to the island of Ada Ciganlija, the Austrians constructed another, classical pontoon bridge, which "leaned on the Long Bridge".

=== 1934–1941 - King Alexander Bridge ===
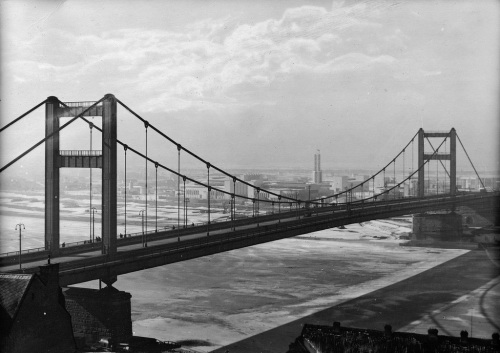
King Alexander Bridge in 1936

King Alexander Bridge (Мост краља Александра) was a road and tram bridge over the Sava. It was the first permanent road bridge across the Sava in Belgrade after almost 250 years and the Long Bridge from 1688. Construction began in July 1930 and the bridge was modeled after the Mülheim Bridge over the Rhine, in Cologne, Germany. The third "twin", based on almost the same project was built in Vienna, Austria, crossing the Danube - the second incarnation of the Reichsbrücke which collapsed due to the structural failure on 1 August 1976. King Alexander Bridge was ceremonially open on 16 December 1934 with 700 horsemen crossing over it and on 5 November 1935 the first tram line over the bridge was established. The bridge was demolished by the Yugoslav army on 11 April 1941 in order to prevent the advance of the German army. Though unusable since April 1941, the remains of the bridge persisted until the heavy "Easter bombing" of Belgrade by the Allies on 16 April 1944 when it was demolished completely. The construction of the bridge was patterned in the Serbo-Byzantine style, placed on two pylons made of reinforced concrete, while it was held by the steel cables. It was praised for having both the important infrastructural and symbolicIvalue as it was the first road bridge spawning the Sava, ending its purpose as the border river and marking the directions in which the city will develop. The bridge was revered while existed being described as "gorgeous" and "one of the most important object ever built in Belgrade". Its pylons were later used for the modern Branko's Bridge in 1956.

=== 1935–1944 - Bridge of King Peter II ===
Bridge of King Peter II (Мост краља Петра II) was the first bridge across the Danube in Belgrade. Construction of the combined, road-railway bridge began in 1933. It was inaugurated on 27 October 1935 and named after the still minor King of Yugoslavia, Petar II. Just like the Old Railway Bridge and the Bridge of King Alexander, it was destroyed by the Yugoslav army in a vain attempt to slow down the German Army advancement. It was destroyed on the night 10/11 April 1941. Germans repaired the bridge for their purposes during the period of occupation in 1941-1944. In the spring of 1944, the Allied Anglo-American bombing of Belgrade began. The bridge was hit and damaged in the bombings of 16 April 16 and 3 September 1944. When the Germans began to withdraw from Belgrade in October 1944, they destroyed the bridge themselves. Pančevo Bridge was built instead of it in 1946.

== Seasonal bridges ==
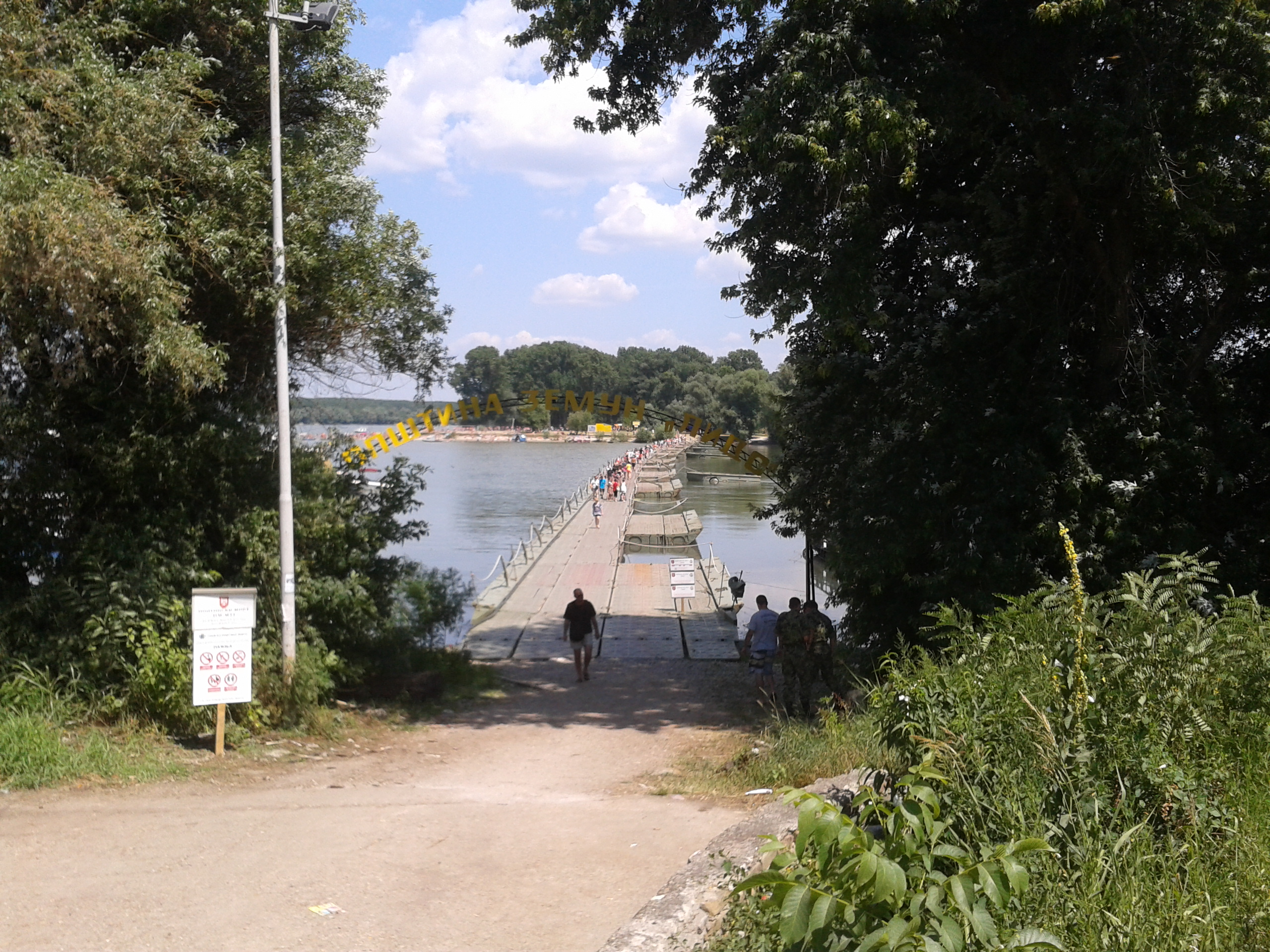

=== Lido Pontoon Bridge ===
In 1966, the military placed the pontoon bridge to connect the Lido Beach, on the Great War Island in Zemun, for the first time. The bridge was relocated from Ada Ciganlija where it stood from 1961, after the permanent embankment was finished. It was later removed. Since 1996, the bridge has been placed each summer during the swimming season as it connects the beach and the neighborhood of Zemunski Kej, across an arm of the Danube. As the beach was almost wiped out during the disastrous 2006 European floods, the bridge wasn't laid in 2006–2008.

In general, the bridge is laid from July to September. It is 375 m (1,230 ft) long and placed by the engineering units of the Serbian Armed Forces. Placing of the bridge regularly sparks protest from the boatmen, either those who work as a ferrymen when there is no bridge, or those who are simply blocked in the Danube's arm between the island and the bank across it.

== Planned bridges ==
=== Ada Huja Bridge ===
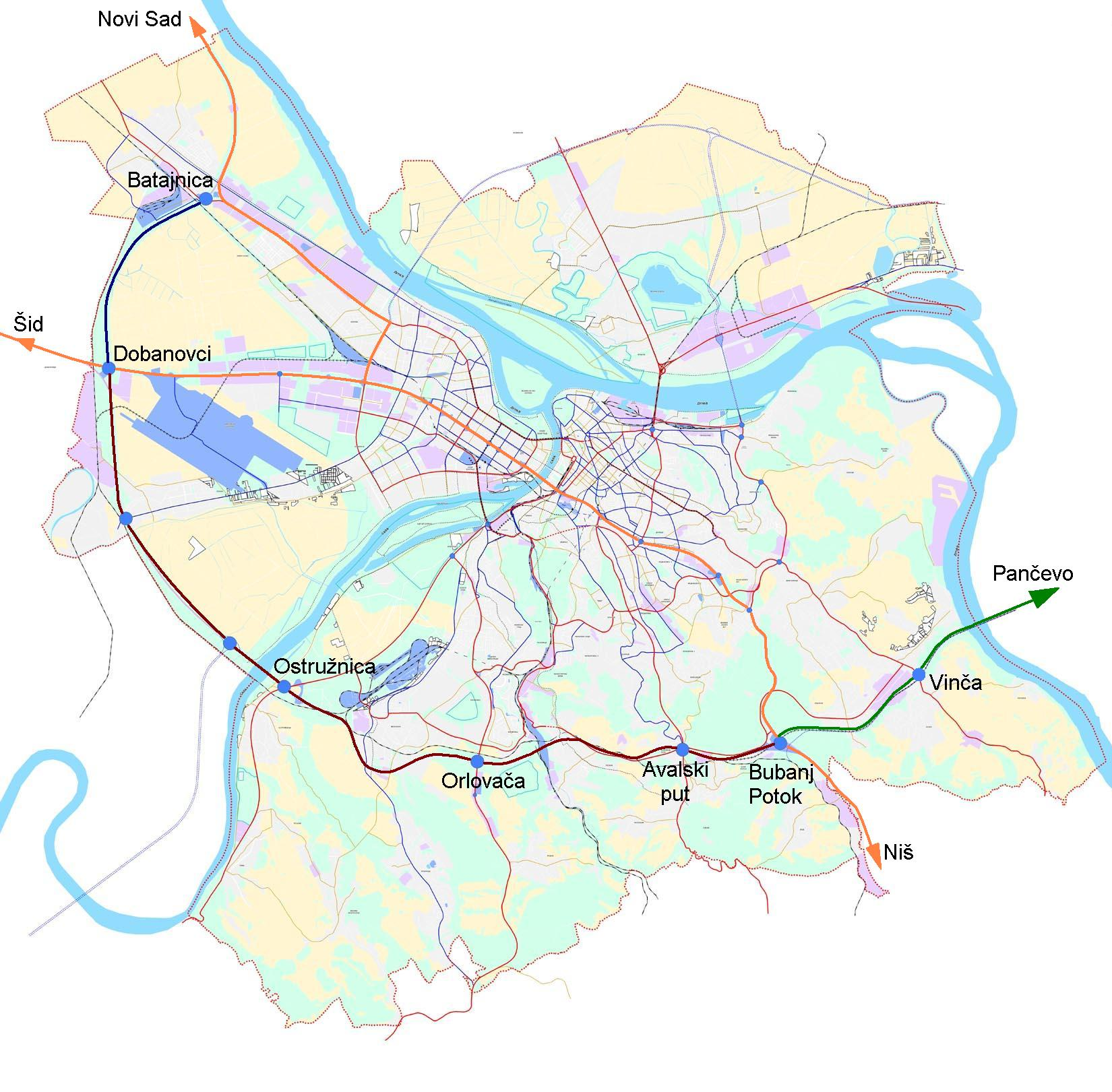
Projected traffic routes of Belgrade, showing locations of Ada Huja and Vinča-Pančevo bridges

Every Belgrade's general urban plan (GUP) since the mid-1950s included the bridge over the Danube, connecting the neighborhoods of Višnjica and Krnjača, over the peninsula of Ada Huja. Parallel to the existing Pančevo Bridge, and projected east of it, the Ada Huja bridge was always envisioned as the important freight transport route. In 2005 city administration announced the construction of the bridge which was to last for 3 years. In April 2008 the construction was announced again, but in March 2009 it was said that it is not a priority. New announcement came in September 2016 with a deadline for the complete paperwork to be finished set at the end of 2017 or early 2018. The bridge will be part of the future Belgrade City Middle Ring Road. In April 2017 city officials stated that the construction of the bridge will start "soon". In April 2018 it was announced that work on the conceptual design and feasibility study began and that it will be finished by the mid-2019. Deputy mayor Goran Vesić stated in July 2018 that the construction will commence in 2020, but in May 2019 moved it to 2021. In September 2020, chief city urbanist Marko Stojčić said the bridge will be built in 2022.

=== Vinča-Pančevo Bridge ===
A combined road-rail bridge, proposed as a part of the still unfinished Belgrade bypass. It will connect the Banat region of Vojvodina directly with central Serbia, which would reroute traffic, especially the freight and hazardous transports, from downtown Belgrade to the outer suburban area. Three variants of the bridge were presented in August 2007. In 2012 it was announced that Chinese investors have a project. In February 2015 it was confirmed that the Chinese investors will build this bridge, too, with a deadline of 3 years. Partial documentation was gathered by September 2015 and in February 2016 the government of Serbia confirmed the construction of the bridge, defining it as a strategic project but labeling the bridge as the "special problem". The bridge will extend from the projected section of the bypass beginning at the interchange of Bubanj Potok and ending at the suburb of Vinča. On the Pančevo side, the bridge will cross at the village of Omoljica. The construction of the bridge is directly connected with the completing of the bypass which, as of April 2020, is not even close to be finished.

=== Metro Bridge ===
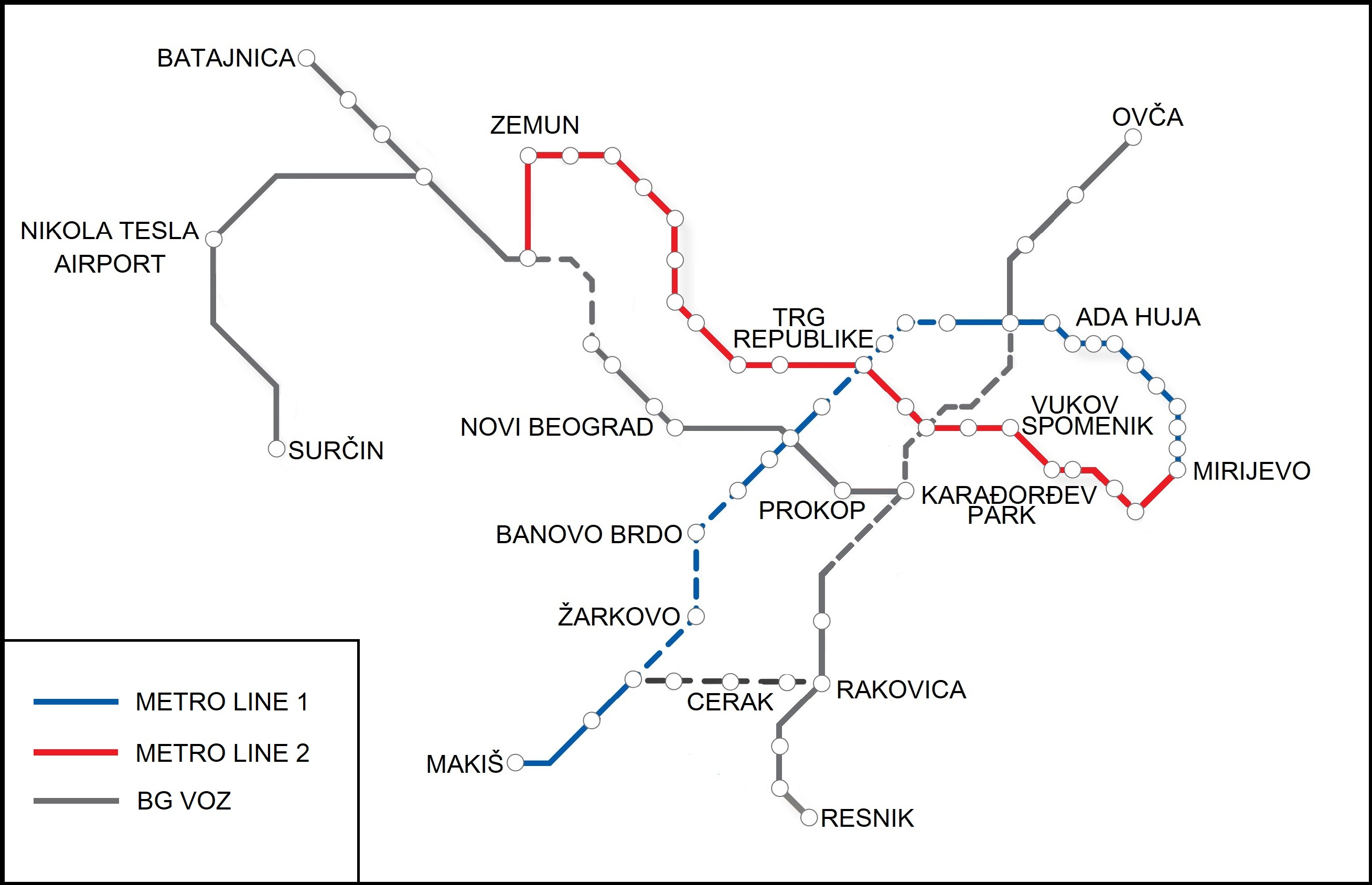
Map of the 2018 subway project with crossing over the Sava (red line)

The bridge was conceived in the 1970s as the carrier of the subway system across the Sava (Serbian metro, subway). It was envisioned as the two-leveled bridge, where upper level would be used by the traffic, pedestrians and cyclists, while the lover level would be used by the subway trains. Its planned location was 80 m (260 ft) upstream from the Old Sava Bridge. Plans for the entire subway grid were fully finished in 1976 but the construction never began, and in 1982 city decided to scrap the subway plans completely. The idea was revived in the 1990s and the talks of the bridge resurfaced in 1998 but again nothing happened. The latest subway plan from 2018-2019 also includes this bridge and alleges the beginning of the construction in 2020, but since the government changed the grid projects several times, as of April 2020 the project for the new bridge isn't drafted at all and it is not known where it will be located or what it would look like. Even if construction would start in 2020, the line planned to commute over the bridge may not be finished in six years after that, with one city plan giving even 2033 as the year when the line will be finished.

=== New Belgrade-Ada Ciganlija Bridge ===
In March 2020, it was announced that the construction of the first pedestrian-cyclist bridge in Belgrade will commence in 2021. It will connect New Belgrade with the island of Ada Ciganlija across the Sava, as the continuation of the Omladinskih Brigada street in Block 70. Public, partially underground garage with 300 parking spots will be built at the end of the street. This is the second part of the project city administration alleged is the result of citizens' online voting (first part is relocation of the Old Sava Bridge on dry land, in the Park Ušće to become an "attraction"). Reporters and public distanced from the voting or debunked it as being rigged. In December 2020, it was announced that the bridge will be finished in 2022. Start of the works was then postponed for the late 2023 or early 2024. With the announcement of the relocation of the Belgrade Zoo to Ada Ciganlija in February 2023, mayor Aleksandar Šapić also announced expedition of this project, stating the bridge could be finished by the early 2025.

=== Great War Island Bridge ===
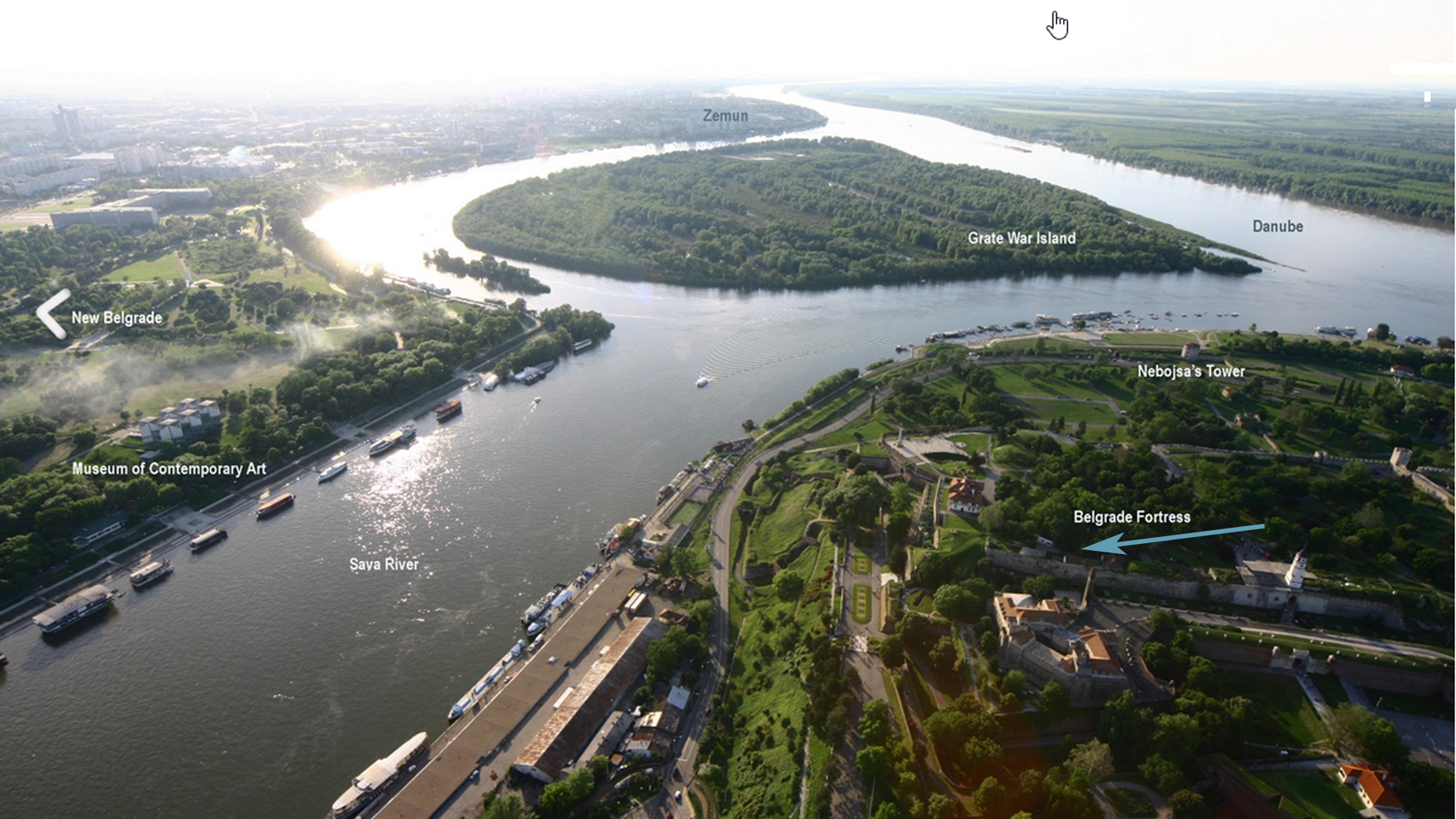
Great War Island

After experimenting with pontoon bridge from 1966, the idea of the permanent bridge was abandoned in 1972. Several proposals of building a proper bridge to the island resurfaced, though environmentalists were always against it. A project for the bridge on two levels to the island was drafted. Designers envisioned that the top level ("upper bridge") would contain a scenic viewpoint and a restaurant. The project was flawed as it failed to consider high water levels of the Danube. In 2017, city announced plan to relocate the Old Sava Bridge to connect Zemun and the island as a pedestrian bridge. This came under strong opposition from the architects and naturalists. The idea was scrapped. In September 2020, Zemun's administration unveiled the preliminary design of the possible bridge. In October 2020, city announced construction of the bridge for 2022, reconfirming it in January 2022.

=== New Sava Bridge ===
City announced a massive reconstruction of the Old Sava Bridge in March 2016, for the late 2017. By the next year, city announced demolition of the old bridge instead, and construction of the new one. Public, engineers, architects and other experts were almost all against it, concluding that the noisy bridge is being removed because of the administration's luxurious pet project, the Belgrade Waterfront. In August 2019 it was announced that the new bridge will be built next to the existing one, which would remain in place until the new bridge is completed. In April 2020, the project was moved to 2021–2022, not just because of the COVID-19 pandemic, but because the construction is not ready anyway. In October 2020 it was said that the new bridge will be built concurrently, while the old bridge will be cut. In September 2021 announcement was made that the old bridge will be demolished in 2022, when the construction of new bridge starts. By August 2022, city proposed that the new bridge should be constructed concurrently with the roundabout and the Savamala-Palilula tunnel, a massive project in the extension of the bridge's carriageways.

== Proposed bridges ==
=== Nemanjina Bridge ===
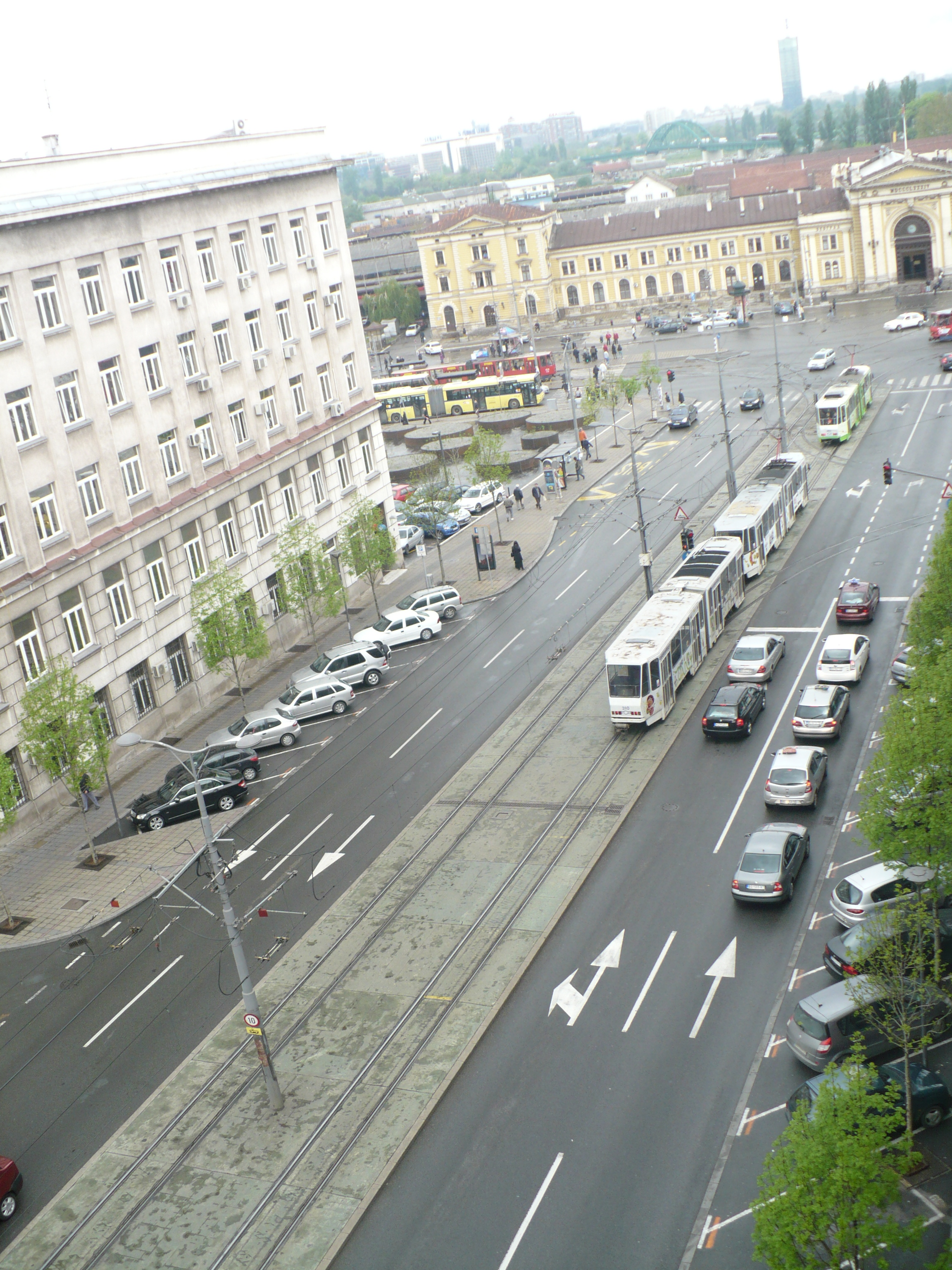
Ending of the Nemanjina Street, where the proposed bridge should start

The bridge across the Sava in the extension of the Nemanjina Street (Savamala, old Belgrade-Staro Sajmište, New Belgrade) is considered to be the "ideal" missing bridge in Belgrade, due to its location. In the 1970s, the measurements were made, geometric survey was conducted, locations of the pillars were set and in the end, even the project was finished. However, the construction of such bridge would be extremely difficult as the areas on the river banks are already urbanized. It would take massive demolitions to clear the area and it was concluded it wouldn't be financially wise either. The idea of the bridge on this location, however, keeps popping-up regularly in discussions regarding transportation in Belgrade.

=== Ada Bridge II ===
When plans were made for the Ada Bridge, one of the proposals was the location on the opposite, upstream tip of Ada Ciganlija, instead of the downstream one, where it was built in the end. It would connect Makiš on the right, and Savski Nasip on the left bank of the Sava. When Ada Bridge was close to be finished, architects suggested this other location as the place where the next Belgrade bridge might or should be built.

=== Other ===
In the late 2021 city announced construction of two new bridges, for the purpose of expanding the urban BG Voz rail system. No specifics were given. In January 2022, it was specified that one of the bridges will be in downtown, and the other one between Surčin and Obrenovac. In March 2022, deputy mayor Goran Vesić said that "by 2030, Belgrade will get 7 new bridges".

== See also ==
- List of bridges in Serbia
- Transport in Belgrade
