= KK Borac Banja Luka =

KK Borac Banja Luka may refer to two Banja Luka-based teams under the name dispute:

- SKK Borac 1947, originally founded in 1947 as KK Borac, dissolute in 2006, and re-established in 2018 as SKK Borac. Currently competing in the Bosnian 3rd-tier league.
- OKK Borac, founded in 2006 as OKK Borac and renamed to KK Borac in 2018. Currently competing in the Bosnian 1st-tier league.

== See also ==
- KK Borac (disambiguation)
