= Kovin Bridge =

Coordinates: 44.6965°N 20.9528°E

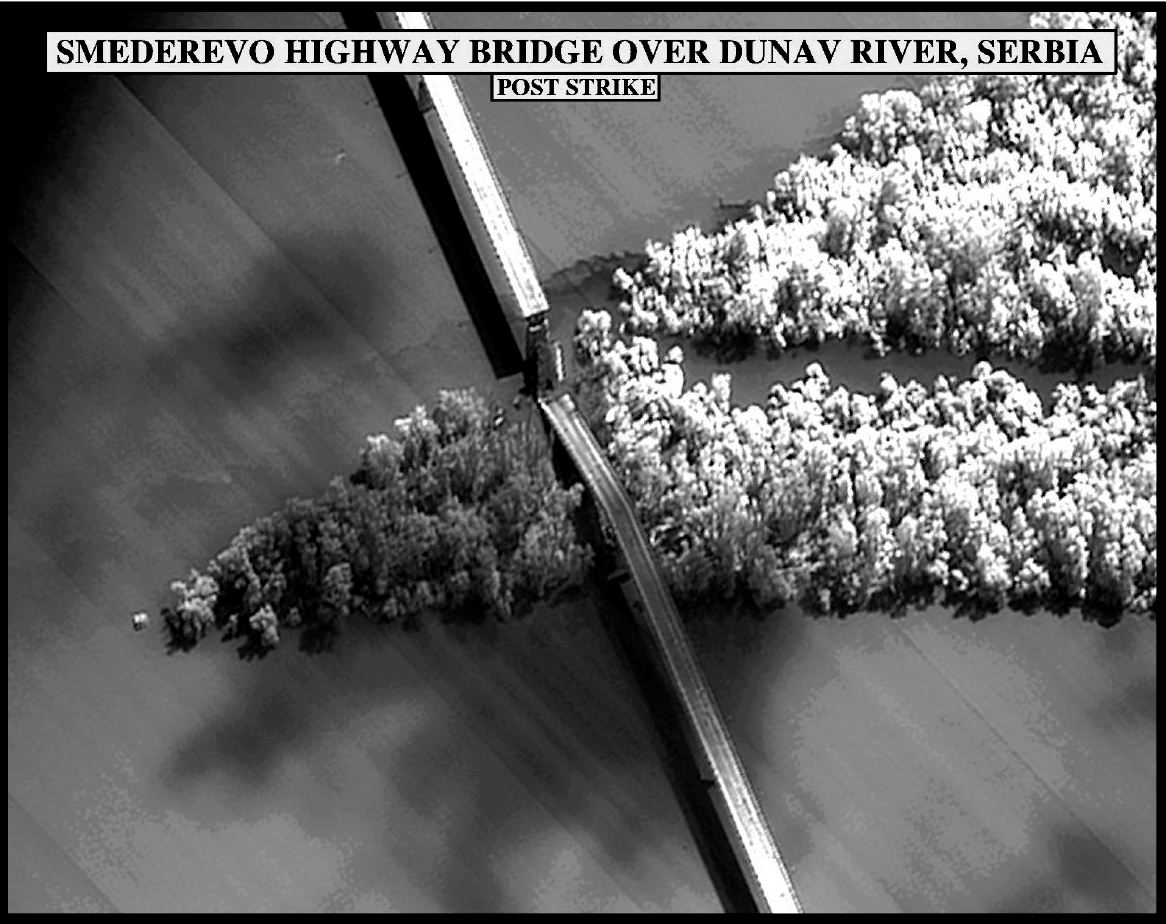
Post-strike photo, 1999

The Kovin Bridge (Serbian: Ковински мост, Kovinski most) is a road bridge in Serbia, across the Danube, between the cities of Kovin and Smederevo.

== See also ==
- List of bridges in Serbia
- List of crossings of the Danube
