= Rača Bridge =

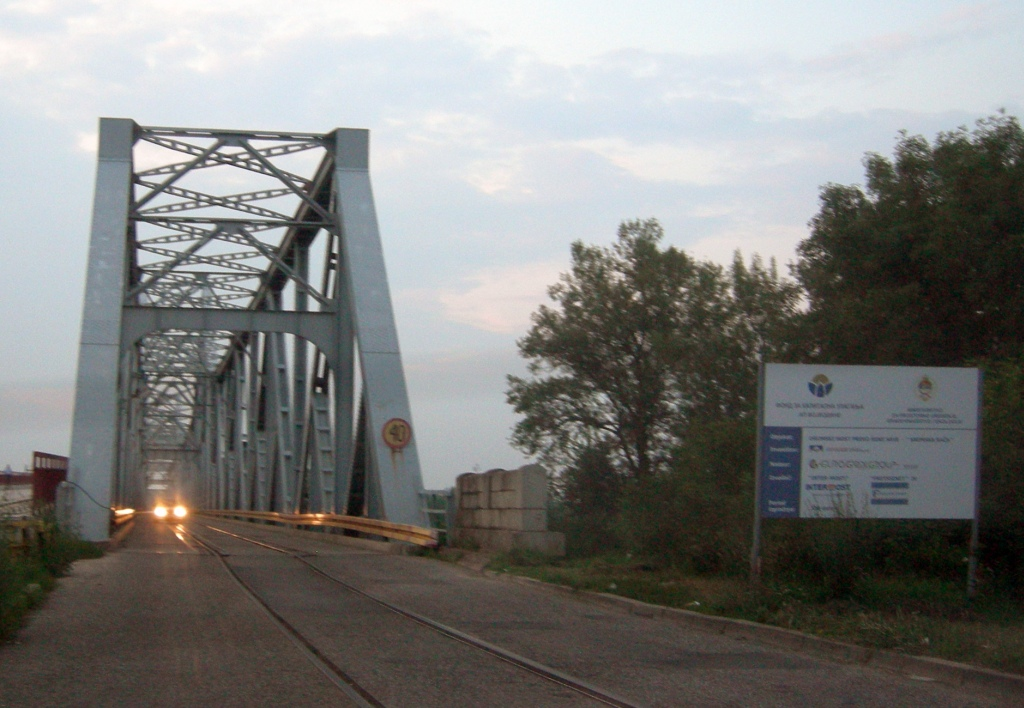
- Old Rača Bridge
- Coordinates: 44°54′35″N 19°17′49″E
- Carries: Road / railway-bridge
- Crosses: Sava River
- Locale: (Serbia) Sremska Rača (Bosnia and Herzegovina) Bosanska Rača

Characteristics
- Material: Steel
- Total length: 410 m
- Longest span: 150 m

History
- Opened: 28 June 1934 (Maria); 6 September 2010 (Europe)

Location
- Interactive map of Rača Bridge

The Rača Bridge (Serbian: Мост у Рачи) is an international bridge over the Sava river, from Sremska Rača in Serbia to Bosanska Rača in Bosnia and Herzegovina.

The Bridge of Maria of Yugoslavia (Мост краљице Марије) was opened on 28 June 1934. The bridge was built by mainly Italian workers.

On September 6, 2010, the Serbian government and Milorad Dodik opened the new Bridge of Europe (Мост Европа), a road bridge built just to the west of the Maria Bridge. Boris Tadić said he hoped the bridge would further bring closer the peoples of both sides of the Sava river, contributing economically Serbia and the Republika Srpska entity.

== See also ==
- List of bridges in Serbia
- List of international bridges
