= KK Borac (disambiguation) =

KK Borac may refer to following basketball clubs:

- KK Borac Čačak, based in Čačak, Serbia (1945–present)
- KK Borac Banja Luka, based in Banja Luka, Bosnia and Herzegovina:
  - OKK Borac, founded in 2006 as OKK Borac and renamed to KK Borac in 2018.
  - SKK Borac 1947, originally founded in 1947 as KK Borac, dissolute in 2006, and re-established in 2018 as SKK Borac.
- KK Borac Zemun, based in Belgrade, Serbia (2014–present)
- KK Borac Zvornik, based in Zvornik, Bosnia and Herzegovina

== See also ==
- FK Borac (disambiguation)
