= FK Borac =

FK Borac may refer to:

- FK Borac Banja Luka, a football club from Banja Luka, Bosnia and Herzegovina
- FK Borac Čačak, a football club from Čačak, Serbia
- FK Borac Kozarska Dubica, a football club from Kozarska Dubica, Bosnia and Herzegovina
- FK Borac Klenak, a football club from Klenak, Serbia
- FK Borac Novi Sad, a football club from Novi Sad, Serbia
- FK Borac Šamac, a football club from Šamac, Bosnia and Herzegovina
