= Pupin Bridge =

Pupin Bridge Pupinov most
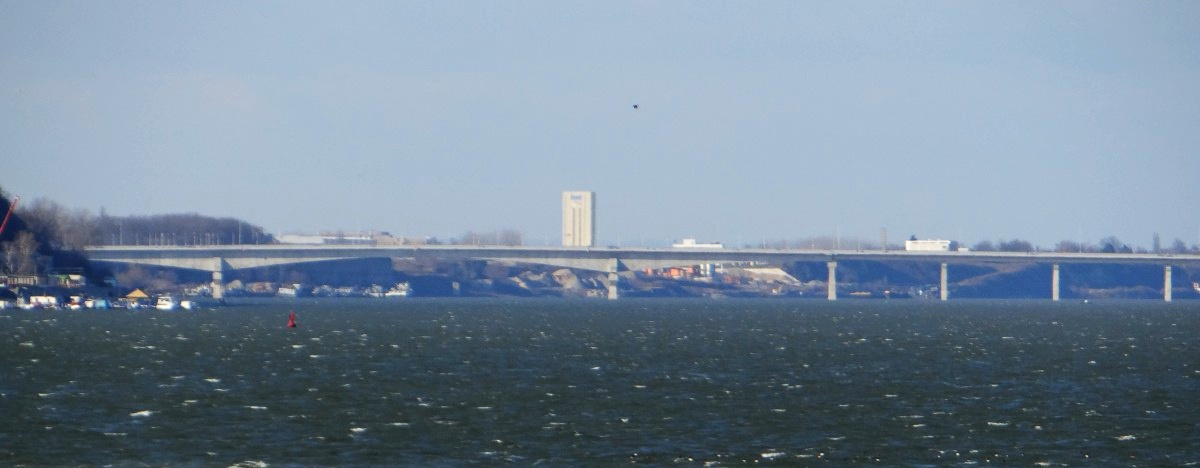
- Coordinates: 44.8645°N 20.3811°E
- Carries: Motor vehicles, Pedestrians, Bicycles
- Crosses: Danube River
- Locale: Belgrade, Serbia

Characteristics
- Design: Girder bridge
- Material: Concrete
- Total length: 1,507 metres (4,944 ft)
- Width: 29.1 metres (95 ft)
- Height: 22.8 metres (75 ft)
- Longest span: 172 metres (564 ft)

History
- Constructed by: China Road and Bridge Corporation
- Construction start: October 2011
- Construction end: 18 December 2014

The Pupin Bridge (Serbian Cyrillic: Пупинов мост, romanized: Pupinov most) is a road bridge over the Danube River in Belgrade, Serbia. The bridge is located upstream of the city center and connects Belgrade neighbourhoods of Zemun and Borča. It is part of Semi-Inner Ring circle. Opened in December 2014, it became the second bridge over the Danube in Belgrade, after the Pančevo Bridge in 1946.

== Name ==
Due to the origin of the investors, even before the construction began, the bridge was colloquially called "Chinese Bridge" (Serbian: Кинески мост, Kineski most). During the construction, its tentative name was Zemun–Borča bridge, but later it got named after Serbian scientist and inventor Mihajlo Pupin. The name Chinese Bridge, however, continued to linger in an informal usage.

It was decided to call it after Pupin as the bridge connects the Banat region, a birth region of the scientists, with Belgrade. As it was decided to name the bridge after Pupin a bit prior to its opening, the Chinese partners decided to mark the occasion placing a marble slab which would commemorate the date of the ceremonial opening. However, this caused a minor scandal. Apart from the bad Serbian grammar, the memorial was carved in the black marble rectangle slab, which, unknown to the Chinese, is a traditional Serbian gravestone. After public protests, "the bridge's headstone" was replaced.

== History ==
The need for a bridge at this location was apparent for decades prior to its construction. However, the bad economic state and constant need for repairs on the bridges across the other Belgrade river, the Sava, postponed the project. First concrete steps were made in 2009 when city administration gave preliminary details about the project. The decision was made that the bridge will be built from the Chinese credits and that Chinese firms will build it, with Serbian companies as the sub-contractors.

In the late 2009 a precontract was signed with the Chinese partners. It stipulated the beginning of the construction in the mid-2010 and the deadline set for the finish was 2013. But the deadlines were postponed in the next year and a half, citing various reasons (lack of seriousness of the Chinese investor, unacceptable requests for advance payments, numerous other Chinese requests, etc.) First workers and the equipment arrived from China only in the mid-2011, and at this moment it was clear that the bridge will not be finished before the spring of 2014. The works were also delayed because of the legal problems with a group of families who lived in the Pregrevica neighborhood of Zemun, where the bridge was to cross on the Zemun's bank.

The bridge construction costs of €170 million were provided by the Exim Bank of China (85%) and the Government of Serbia and the City of Belgrade (15%). The Chinese-built bridge was also China's first big infrastructure investment on the European continent.

The total cost of the bridge and the access roads in the end reached €260 million.

== Construction ==
The works began in earnest in the fall of 2011. The inhabitants from Pregrevica were resettled to the neighborhood of Bele Vode, in the municipality of Čukarica, in the late 2011 and early 2012. In January 2012, famed film actor Bata Živojinović visited the workers to wish them happy Chinese New Year, as his 1972 film Walter Defends Sarajevo is one of the most popular war movies in China while Živojinović himself was one of the most popular foreign actors in China.

In July 2014, the two sides of the bridge were connected and the works continued up to the fall of that year. The bridge was opened by Premier of the People's Republic of China Li Keqiang on 18 December 2014.

== Characteristics ==
The bridge and 21.6 kilometres (13.4 miles) of new access roads will help to divert heavy traffic from Belgrade city centre. The bridge is designed as two independent bridge structures of three car lanes 3.5 metres (11 ft) wide and pedestrian-bicycle paths on both sides.

== See also ==
- List of bridges in Serbia
- List of crossings of the Danube
