= Klenak, Ruma =

Klenak Кленак (Serbian)
- Village (Selo)
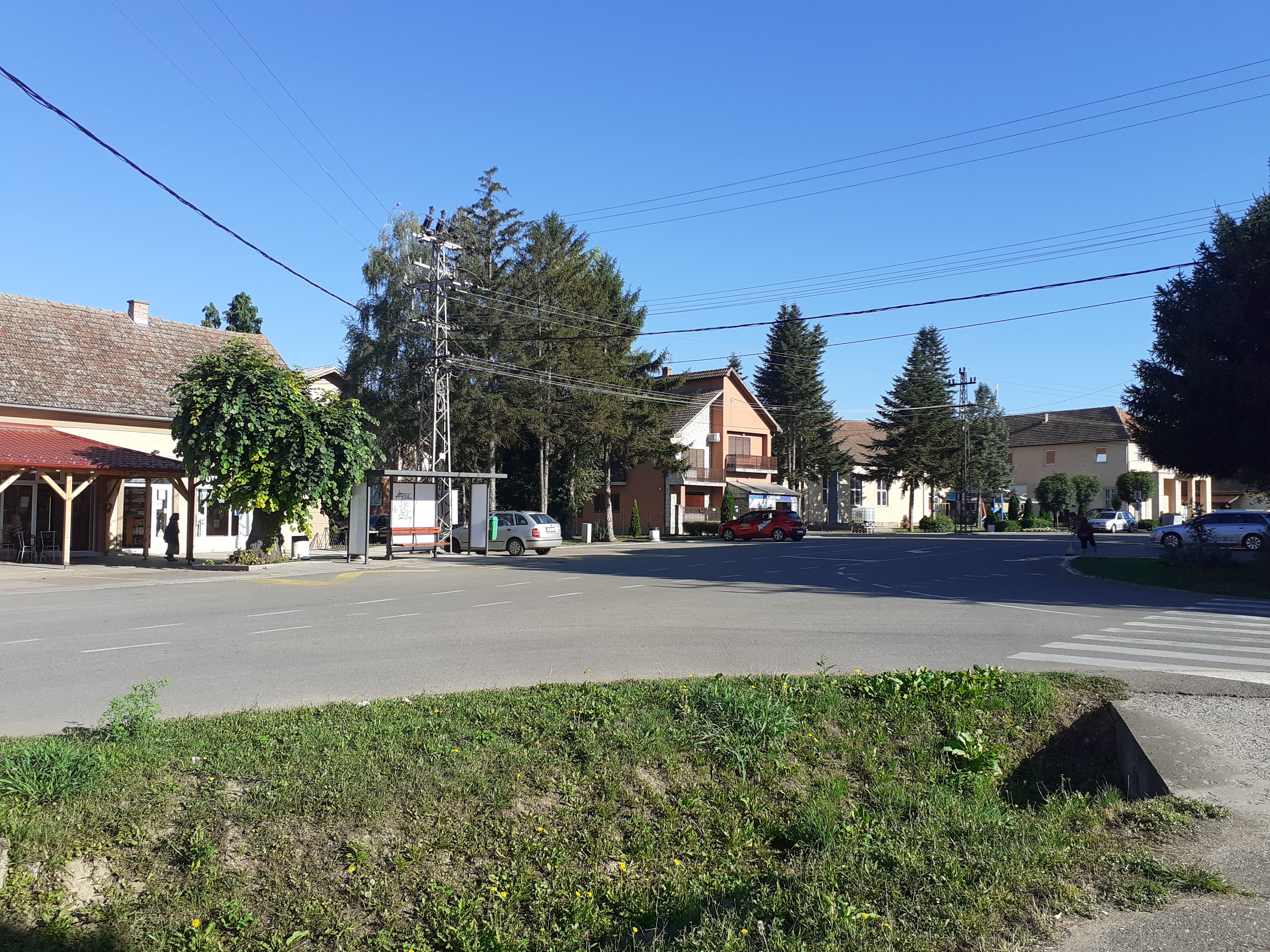

- Location within Vojvodina Location within Serbia Location within Europe
- Country: Serbia
- Province: Vojvodina
- District: Srem
- Municipality: Ruma

Population (2002)
  - Total: 3,246
- Time zone: UTC+1 (CET)
  - Summer (DST): UTC+2 (CEST)

Klenak (Serbian Cyrillic: Кленак) is a village in Serbia. It is situated in the Ruma municipality, in the Srem District, Vojvodina province. The village has a Serb ethnic majority and its population numbering 3,246 people (2002 census). The village also has its own football club FK Borac Klenak.

== See also ==
- List of places in Serbia
- List of cities, towns and villages in Vojvodina
