= FK Borac Klenak =

Borac Klenak
- Full name: Fudbalski klub Borac Klenak
- Nickname: Borac
- Founded: 1925
- Ground: FK Borac Stadium
- Capacity: 500
- Chairman: Zoran Peric
- Manager: Zoran Tomic
- League: Ruma Municipal League
- 2025-2026: 8th
Home colours	Away colours

Fudbalski klub Borac Klenak (Serbian Cyrillic: Фудбалски клуб Борац Кленак) is a semi-professional Serbian football club from the village of Klenak. They currently compete in the Ruma Municipal League, Serbia's 7th tier league.

== History ==
The club was founded in 1925 in the village of Klenak at the initiative of Rade Brlažnik and Joca Klein. The first stadium was on the banks of the Sava river but was relocated in the late 1970s to its current location due to heavy floods. The stadium can support about 500 people. In addition to the senior section, the club has a cadet and veteran section. The club's most historic success was hosting a friendly match between their veterans and Red Star Belgrade's veterans led by Vladimir Petrović.

== Club records ==
- PFL Sremska Mitrovica 2018-19 — 11th
- PFL Sremska Mitrovica 2017-18 — 7th
- PFL Sremska Mitrovica 2016-17 — 7th
- Opstinska Liga Ruma-Irig (1. razred) 2012−13 — 7th
- Opstinska Liga Ruma-Irig — 1st
- Medjuopstinska Liga Srem 2015-16 — 1st

=== Recent league history ===
Season	Division	P	W	D	L	F	A	Pts	Pos
2023–24	Ruma Municipal League	16	1	4	11	18	60	7	8th
2024–25	Ruma Municipal League	15	3	3	9	20	54	12	8th
