= Sremska Rača =

Sremska Rača Сремска Рача (Serbian)
- Village (Selo)
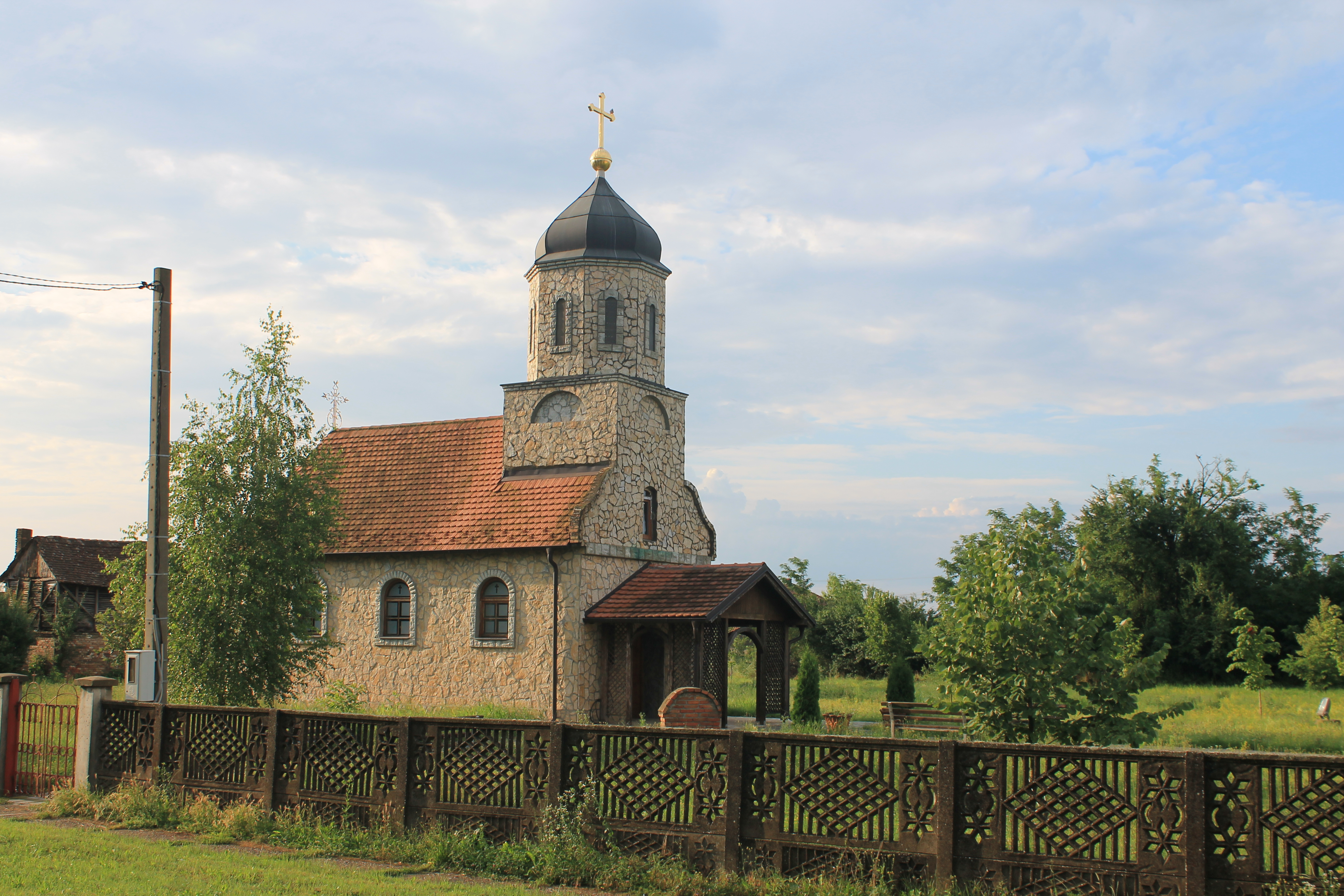

- Location within Vojvodina Location within Serbia Location within Europe
- Coordinates: 44°55′N 19°17′E
- Country: Serbia
- Province: Vojvodina
- Region: Syrmia
- District: Srem
- Municipality: Sremska Mitrovica

Area
  - Total: 45.98 km^{2} (17.75 sq mi)
- Elevation elevation: 78 m (256 ft)

Population (2011)
  - Total: 624
  - Density: 13.6/km^{2} (35.1/sq mi)
- Time zone: UTC+1 (CET)
  - Summer (DST): UTC+2 (CEST)
- postal code: 22247
- Area code: +38122

Sremska Rača (Serbian Cyrillic: Сремска Рача) is a village located in the city of Sremska Mitrovica, Serbia. As of 2011 census, the village has a population of 624 inhabitants. A border crossing between Serbia and Bosnia and Herzegovina is located in the village.

== Name ==
In Serbian, the village is known as Sremska Rača (Сремска Рача), in Croatian as Srijemska Rača, and in Hungarian as Racsa. Sremska Raca is a settlement in Serbia in the municipality Sremska Mitrovica in the Srem district and is 35 km away from Sremska Mitrovica. It is located on a narrow belt between the Sava and Bosut rivers. According to the 2011 census report, there were 624 inhabitants.

== Geographic features ==
Sremska Rača is a typical lowland area with an average altitude of 81m and a maximum altitude difference of 2m. The area of Sremska Rača has a slightly humid temperate continental climate. This is due to the clash of two basic climatic types - the drier, moderately continental climate of Vojvodina and the humid climate of the mountainous regions of Bosnia. The characteristics of this climate are moderately warm summers and cold winters. The coldest month is January. The average annual humidity is 78%. The maximum saturation of air humidity is in December (88%) and the minimum in August (73%). In other months, the saturation of the air depends on the amount of precipitation. The most common of the winds is the east - kosava followed by the west and northwest winds. The southern wind is the least frequent.

== Historical development of the city ==
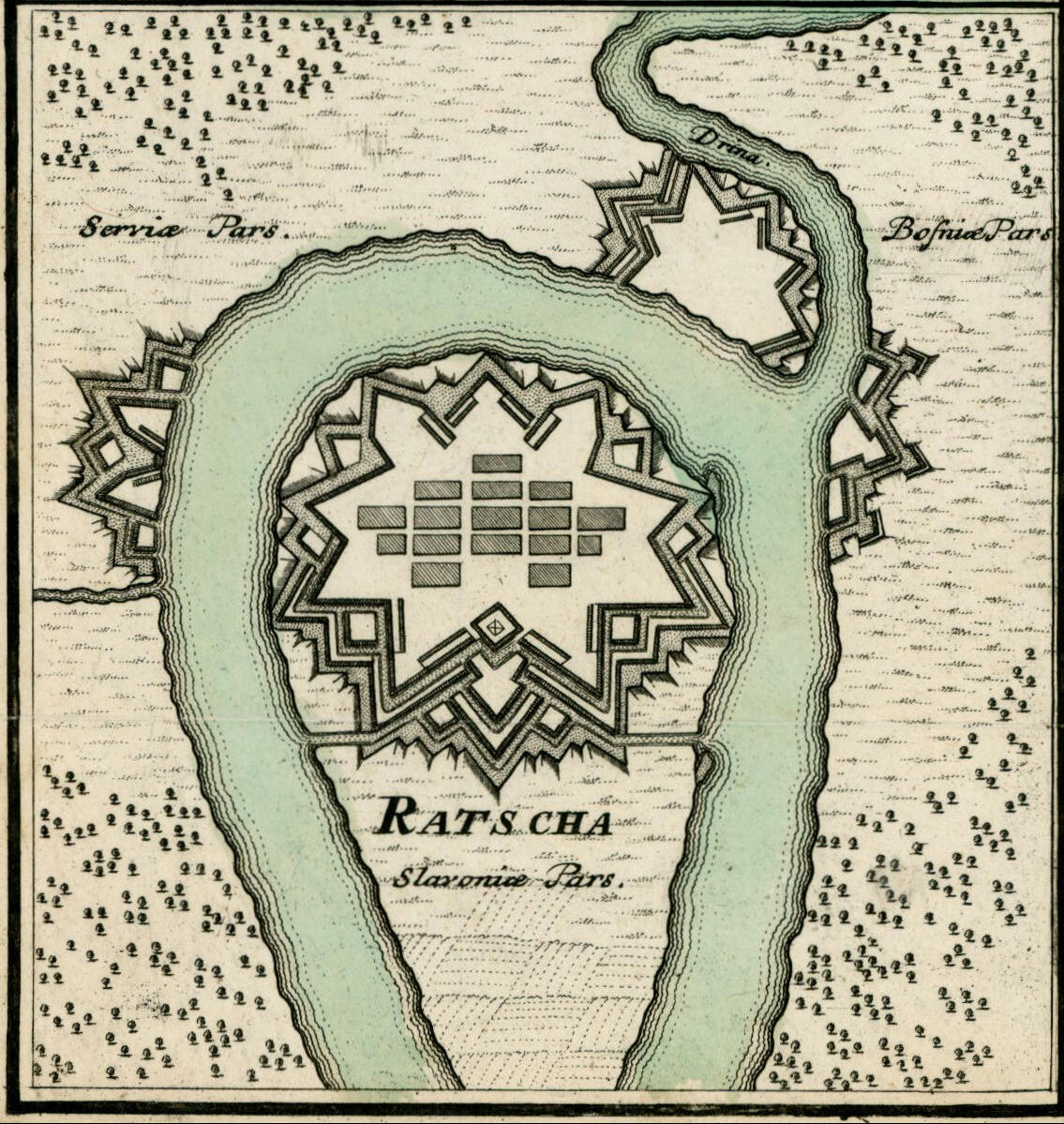
1738 map of the fortifications of Sremska Rača

Sremska Rača is a settlement with a short development period. When the bridge over the Sava was built, Sremska Rača remained within the embankment. In 1931, Rača survived a catastrophic flood, which is why the state moved it outside the embankment in 1934 to the particularly flat terrain on which it remains today. Sremska Rača, 5 kilometres away from the river, has a rich historical past. [1] At the site of Bela Crkva, about 1 kilometre south of the center of today's village, there is a famous Roman military settlement from the first century. Many items such as metal bowls, armour and swords are stored in the Museum of Srem in Sremska Mitrovica. Rača gained importance because of its favourable position on the Sava into which the Drina flows from the Bosnian side. There, from time immemorial was a major crossing over the Račan and a trade route crossroads as well. At the end of the river bend, situated was the town and fortress of Rača, and the village of Stara Rača was located 2 kilometres from the city on the eastern and western sides of the peninsula on the banks of the Sava.

In the Middle Ages, Rača was recorded in a single document in 1275. This property was first owned by Hungarian nobles from the Einard family, then by Somakoš Kukojevacki, Ivan Morović and finally by Stephen Báthory. In the first half of the 14th century, Elizabeth, the wife of the Hungarian King Charles I, rebuilt the abbey of St. Nicholas and handed it to the Franciscans for the monastery. In the second half of the 14th century, after the death of King Lajos I or Louis I (son of Charles I), records were kept of the "Royal Town of Rača at the mouth of the Drina River in the Sava". According to one document, citizens complained to the queen about clerks, who did not allow them to practice old, free customs. In doing so, the queen gave the citizens the freedom to choose between a chief and a juror, who would judge with her clerk. When Bosnia fell under the Turkish yoke, Hungarian king Matthias Corvinus went on a campaign against the Turks and stayed in Rača for two days. In 1529, it was probably conquered by the Turks. Evliya Çelebi wrote about Rača: “It was a beautiful city on the banks of the Sava River, laid on high, flat terrain covered with greenery. The city itself lay at the top of a cape. It had a triangular shape and was made of brick ... ”

In 1699 Rača became part of Austria. Two years later, a 100-foot, 50-man cavalry and 100 border guards were set up in the town. The village was then populated by Serbs and in 1733 had 14 homes and 62 inhabitants. In 1784 the fortress of Rača was rebuilt because the old one was already destroyed. That year, the Austrian Emperor Joseph II personally visited Rača and for that occasion, a road was built from the village of Rača to the fort. At the beginning of the 19th century, Rača had 58 houses and 445 inhabitants. At the end of the same century, the fort was rebuilt and redeveloped into a 300-strong penitentiary. There were usually about 180 convicts and 20 guards in it. The unhealthy facility and the poor food made everyone feel sick Not long after, the object was bought by a merchant from Osijek who turned it into a brewery. The fort was later sold again and the brick removed. In 1911 the Šid-Rača railway was built. Between the two world wars, there was a municipality in Rača with a post office, telegraph and telephone, as well as a gendarmerie station and financial administrative control bureau.

During the Second World War, on 19 July 1943, the Second Srem Communist Partisan Detachment was formed in Sremska Rača, while on 17 January 1944, the Sixth Vojvodina Brigade was formed. During World War II, thousands of fighters passed through Rača, going to Bosnia. Later, in memory of the fight, a song emerged: "When the Srem's set off from Fruška Gora". The head of the English military mission also visited Sremska Rača and described in the book "Partisan Pictures" the suffering of the population there.

During World War II, the entire village was burned down and the villagers cruelly massacred by the 13th Waffen Mountain Division of the SS Handschar, which was also made up of Muslims from Bosnia. This act was carried out in retaliation for the Partisan attacks on German transport.

After World War II, out of 220 houses, only three remained, the rest was totally razed to the ground. In 1953, the local community, the post office and the veterinary community were reconstructed.

== Historical population ==
- 1961: 1,001
- 1971: 1,043
- 1981: 942
- 1991: 777
- 2002: 773
- 2011: 624

== See also ==
- Rača Bridge, Bosnia and Herzegovina.
- List of places in Serbia
- List of cities, towns and villages in Vojvodina
